= District 26 (Chamber of Deputies of Chile) =

Electoral district of the Chamber of Deputies of Chile

- Distrito 26
- Electoral District for the Chamber of Deputies
- Location of District 26 within Chile
- Commune: List: Ancud; Calbuco; Castro; Chaitén; Chonchi; Cochamó; Curaco de Vélez; Dalcahue; Futaleufú; Hualaihué; Maullín; Palena; Puerto Montt; Puqueldón; Queilén; Quellón; Quemchi; Quinchao
- Region: Los Lagos
- Population: 484,660 (2017)
- Electorate: 424,820 (2021)
- Area: 31,325 km^{2} (2020)

Current Electoral District
- Created: 2017
- Seats: 5 (2017–present)
- Deputies: List: Alejandro Bernales (PL); Fernando Bórquez (UDI); Mauro González (RN); Jaime Sáez (FA); Héctor Ulloa (Ind)

District 26 (Spanish: Distrito 26) is one of the 28 multi-member electoral districts of the Chamber of Deputies, the lower house of the National Congress, the national legislature of Chile. The district was created by the 2015 electoral reform and came into being at the following general election in 2017. It consists of the communes of Ancud, Calbuco, Castro, Chaitén, Chonchi, Cochamó, Curaco de Vélez, Dalcahue, Futaleufú, Hualaihué, Maullín, Palena, Puerto Montt, Puqueldón, Queilén, Quellón, Quemchi and Quinchao in the region of Los Lagos. The district currently elects five of the 155 members of the Chamber of Deputies using the open party-list proportional representation electoral system. At the 2021 general election the district had 424,820 registered electors.

== Electoral system ==
District 26 currently elects five of the 155 members of the Chamber of Deputies using the open party-list proportional representation electoral system. Parties may form electoral pacts with each other to pool their votes and increase their chances of winning seats. However, the number of candidates nominated by an electoral pact may not exceed the maximum number of candidates that a single party may nominate. Seats are allocated using the D'Hondt method.

== Election results ==
=== Summary ===
| Election | Apruebo Dignidad AD / FA | | | Green Ecologists PEV | | | New Social Pact NPS / NM | | | Democratic Convergence CD | | | Chile Vamos Podemos / Vamos | | | Party of the People PDG | | | Christian Social Front FSC | | |
| Election | Votes | % | Seats | Votes | % | Seats | Votes | % | Seats | Votes | % | Seats | Votes | % | Seats | Votes | % | Seats | Votes | % | Seats |
|---|---|---|---|---|---|---|---|---|---|---|---|---|---|---|---|---|---|---|---|---|---|
| 2021 | 21,420 | 14.37% | 1 | 10,084 | 6.77% | 0 | 38,455 | 25.80% | 2 | | | | 36,142 | 24.25% | 2 | 15,755 | 10.57% | 0 | 16,437 | 11.03% | 0 |
| 2017 | 17,598 | 12.78% | 1 | | | | 29,065 | 21.10% | 1 | 17,214 | 12.50% | 1 | 50,691 | 36.80% | 2 | | | | | | |

=== Detailed ===
==== 2021 ====
Results of the 2021 general election held on 21 November 2021:

| Party | | Pact | Party | | | | | | Pact | | |
| Party | | Pact | Votes per province | | | Total votes | % | Seats | Votes | % | Seats |
| Party | | Pact | Chiloé | Llan- quihue (part) | Palena | Total votes | % | Seats | Votes | % | Seats |
|---|---|---|---|---|---|---|---|---|---|---|---|
| Liberal Party of Chile | PL | New Social Pact | 2,370 | 6,451 | 372 | 9,193 | 6.17% | 1 | 38,455 | 25.80% | 2 |
| Citizens | CIU | New Social Pact | 956 | 8,135 | 85 | 9,176 | 6.16% | 1 | 38,455 | 25.80% | 2 |
| Socialist Party of Chile | PS | New Social Pact | 4,010 | 3,136 | 126 | 7,272 | 4.88% | 0 | 38,455 | 25.80% | 2 |
| Party for Democracy | PPD | New Social Pact | 3,616 | 2,439 | 387 | 6,442 | 4.32% | 0 | 38,455 | 25.80% | 2 |
| Christian Democratic Party | PDC | New Social Pact | 1,940 | 4,122 | 310 | 6,372 | 4.28% | 0 | 38,455 | 25.80% | 2 |
| Independent Democratic Union | UDI | Chile Podemos + | 9,965 | 8,948 | 671 | 19,584 | 13.14% | 1 | 36,142 | 24.25% | 2 |
| National Renewal | RN | Chile Podemos + | 5,009 | 10,761 | 788 | 16,558 | 11.11% | 1 | 36,142 | 24.25% | 2 |
| Democratic Revolution | RD | Apruebo Dignidad | 3,114 | 5,323 | 358 | 8,795 | 5.90% | 1 | 21,420 | 14.37% | 1 |
| Communist Party of Chile | PC | Apruebo Dignidad | 2,802 | 5,182 | 278 | 8,262 | 5.54% | 0 | 21,420 | 14.37% | 1 |
| Social Convergence | CS | Apruebo Dignidad | 1,685 | 822 | 70 | 2,577 | 1.73% | 0 | 21,420 | 14.37% | 1 |
| Comunes | COM | Apruebo Dignidad | 558 | 1,182 | 46 | 1,786 | 1.20% | 0 | 21,420 | 14.37% | 1 |
| Republican Party | REP | Christian Social Front | 3,416 | 12,483 | 538 | 16,437 | 11.03% | 0 | 16,437 | 11.03% | 0 |
| Party of the People | PDG | | 5,202 | 10,090 | 463 | 15,755 | 10.57% | 0 | 15,755 | 10.57% | 0 |
| Green Ecologist Party | PEV | | 2,951 | 6,744 | 389 | 10,084 | 6.77% | 0 | 10,084 | 6.77% | 0 |
| Arturo Sanchez Gatica (Independent) | Ind | | 2,000 | 5,304 | 281 | 7,585 | 5.09% | 0 | 7,585 | 5.09% | 0 |
| National Citizen Party | PNC | United Independents | 705 | 1,271 | 75 | 2,051 | 1.38% | 0 | 3,155 | 2.12% | 0 |
| United Centre | CU | United Independents | 389 | 677 | 38 | 1,104 | 0.74% | 0 | 3,155 | 2.12% | 0 |
| Valid votes | | | 50,688 | 93,070 | 5,275 | 149,033 | 100.00% | 5 | 149,033 | 100.00% | 5 |
| Blank votes | | | 8,499 | 9,126 | 1,451 | 19,076 | 10.76% | | | | |
| Rejected votes – other | | | 3,457 | 5,266 | 451 | 9,174 | 5.17% | | | | |
| Total polled | | | 62,644 | 107,462 | 7,177 | 177,283 | 41.73% | | | | |
| Registered electors | | | 162,548 | 242,197 | 20,075 | 424,820 | | | | | |
| Turnout | | | 38.54% | 44.37% | 35.75% | 41.73% | | | | | |

The following candidates were elected: Alejandro Bernales (PL), 9,193 votes; Fernando Bórquez (UDI), 7,700 votes; Mauro González (RN), 9,569 votes; Jaime Sáez (RD), 4,776 votes; and Héctor Ulloa (CIU), 9,176 votes.

==== 2017 ====
Results of the 2017 general election held on 19 November 2017:

| Party | | Pact | Party | | | | | | Pact | | |
| Party | | Pact | Votes per province | | | Total votes | % | Seats | Votes | % | Seats |
| Party | | Pact | Chiloé | Llan- quihue (part) | Palena | Total votes | % | Seats | Votes | % | Seats |
|---|---|---|---|---|---|---|---|---|---|---|---|
| National Renewal | RN | Chile Vamos | 18,392 | 19,454 | 1,919 | 39,765 | 28.87% | 2 | 50,691 | 36.80% | 2 |
| Independent Democratic Union | UDI | Chile Vamos | 1,140 | 9,396 | 390 | 10,926 | 7.93% | 0 | 50,691 | 36.80% | 2 |
| Socialist Party of Chile | PS | Nueva Mayoría | 6,204 | 11,068 | 1,005 | 18,277 | 13.27% | 1 | 29,065 | 21.10% | 1 |
| Party for Democracy | PPD | Nueva Mayoría | 3,749 | 3,803 | 226 | 7,778 | 5.65% | 0 | 29,065 | 21.10% | 1 |
| Social Democrat Radical Party | PRSD | Nueva Mayoría | 799 | 2,064 | 147 | 3,010 | 2.19% | 0 | 29,065 | 21.10% | 1 |
| Liberal Party of Chile | PL | Broad Front | 1,738 | 5,988 | 151 | 7,877 | 5.72% | 1 | 17,598 | 12.78% | 1 |
| Green Ecologist Party | PEV | Broad Front | 1,767 | 5,680 | 158 | 7,605 | 5.52% | 0 | 17,598 | 12.78% | 1 |
| Citizen Power | PODER | Broad Front | 516 | 1,542 | 58 | 2,116 | 1.54% | 0 | 17,598 | 12.78% | 1 |
| Christian Democratic Party | PDC | Democratic Convergence | 7,894 | 8,661 | 659 | 17,214 | 12.50% | 1 | 17,214 | 12.50% | 1 |
| Progressive Party | PRO | All Over Chile | 3,582 | 5,535 | 222 | 9,339 | 6.78% | 0 | 9,339 | 6.78% | 0 |
| Patagonian Regional Democracy | DRP | Green Regionalist Coalition | 1,890 | 6,526 | 201 | 8,617 | 6.26% | 0 | 8,617 | 6.26% | 0 |
| Citizens | CIU | Sumemos | 3,227 | 1,197 | 88 | 4,512 | 3.28% | 0 | 5,220 | 3.79% | 0 |
| Todos | TODOS | Sumemos | 251 | 425 | 32 | 708 | 0.51% | 0 | 5,220 | 3.79% | 0 |
| Valid votes | | | 51,149 | 81,339 | 5,256 | 137,744 | 100.00% | 5 | 137,744 | 100.00% | 5 |
| Blank votes | | | 6,016 | 7,631 | 1,054 | 14,701 | 9.16% | | | | |
| Rejected votes – other | | | 2,812 | 4,805 | 347 | 7,964 | 4.96% | | | | |
| Total polled | | | 59,977 | 93,775 | 6,657 | 160,409 | 40.18% | | | | |
| Registered electors | | | 154,633 | 225,465 | 19,176 | 399,274 | | | | | |
| Turnout | | | 38.79% | 41.59% | 34.72% | 40.18% | | | | | |

The following candidates were elected: Jenny Álvarez (PS), 10,162 votes; Gabriel Ascencio (PDC), 9,326 votes; Alejandro Bernales (PL), 6,200 votes; Carlos Kuschel (RN), 11,250 votes; and Alejandro Santana (RN), 23,558 votes.
