= Mauro González Villarroel =

Chilean politician (born 1985)

Mauro González
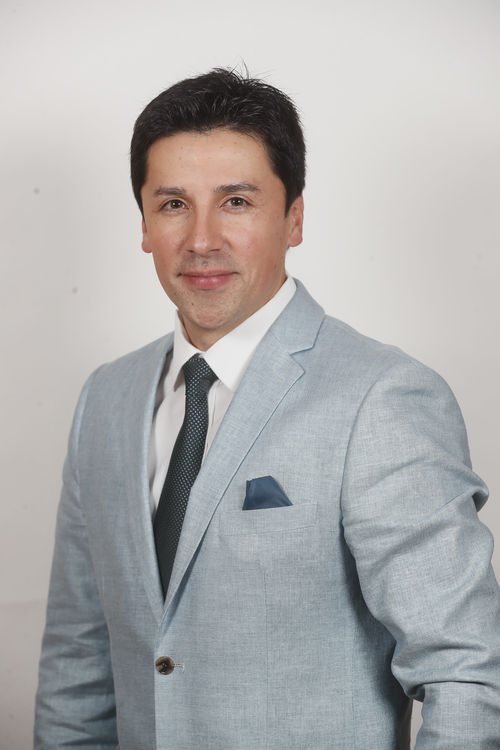

Member of the Chamber of Deputies
- Incumbent
- Assumed office 11 March 2022
- Preceded by: Creation of the District
- Constituency: District 26

Personal details
- Born: 25 May 1985 (age 41) Santiago, Chile
- Party: National Renewal
- Education: Gabriela Mistral University (BA); Santo Tomás University (PgD)
- Occupation: Politician
- Profession: Lawyer

Mauro Daniel González Villarroel (born 25 May 1985) is a Chilean politician and lawyer who currently serves as member of the Chamber of Deputies of Chile.

== Family and early life ==
He was born in Puerto Varas on 25 May 1985, the son of Mauro Fredy González Carillo and Erna Alicia Villarroel Luengo.

He married Valeria Romina Paredes Recabarren on 20 February 2013 in the commune of Fresia.

== Professional life ==
He completed his secondary education at the Purísimo Corazón de María School in the commune of Fresia in 2002.

He is a lawyer and holds a degree in legal and social sciences from Gabriela Mistral University. He is also a candidate for a master’s degree in public law at Santo Tomás University (Puerto Montt campus). At the same institution, he has completed postgraduate diplomas in procedural law, constitutional law and constitutional actions, administrative law, applied administrative law, and a postgraduate specialisation in public law.

== Political career ==
Prior to his election to the Chamber of Deputies of Chile, he served for two years as Regional Secretary (Seremi) of Labour and Social Security, and subsequently as Regional Director of Labour for the Los Lagos Region, holding the latter position until mid-August 2021.

He has also worked as a legal advisor, acting municipal secretary, and director of internal control for the Municipality of Fresia.

In the parliamentary elections held on 21 November 2021, he was elected deputy for the 26th electoral district of the Los Lagos Region, comprising the communes of Ancud, Calbuco, Castro, Chaitén, Chonchi, Cochamó, Curaco de Vélez, Dalcahue, Futaleufú, Hualaihué, Maullín, Palena, Puerto Montt, Puqueldón, Queilén, Quellón, Quemchi and Quinchao. He was elected representing National Renewal (RN) within the Chile Podemos Más coalition for the 2022–2026 legislative term, obtaining 9,569 votes, equivalent to 6.42% of the valid votes cast, and achieving the highest vote share in the district.
