= Alejandro Bernales =

Chilean politician (born 1979)

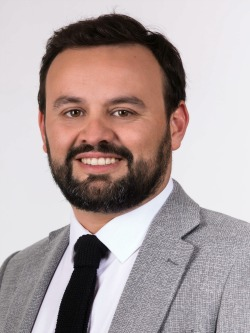

Member of the Chamber of Deputies
- Incumbent
- Assumed office 11 March 2018
- Constituency: District 26

Regional Director of the National Council of Culture and the Arts
- In office April 2010 – 11 March 2014
- President: Sebastián Piñera

Personal details
- Born: 2 February 1979 (age 47) Valdivia, Chile
- Party: Liberal
- Spouse: Paz Vidal
- Children: Two
- Parent(s): Alfonso Bernales; Norka Maldonado
- Education: Andrés Bello National University (BA); University of Chile (PgD)
- Occupation: Politician
- Profession: Architect

Alejandro Javier Bernales Maldonado (born 2 February 1979) is a Chilean graphic designer and politician who serves as a parliamentary in the Chamber of Deputies of Chile.

In the early-2010s, Bernales was a member of Sebastián Piñera's first government (2010−2014). However, then he joined to the Liberal Party (centre-left), which in 2017 joined the leftist coalition Broad Front (FA). Three years later, his party left the FA.

== Early life ==
Bernales did a BA in graphic design at the Andrés Bello National University (UNAB). Later, he completed two post-graduate diplomas in Digital Photography and in Cultural Management at the University of Chile.

From April 2010 to March 2014, Bernales was part of the first government of Sebastián Piñera and served as Regional Director of the National Council for Culture and the Arts in Los Lagos Region.

In 2011, he was chosen among the 100 young leaders of the magazine Saturday from El Mercurio newspaper. Similarly, Bernales also was ranked among these 100 leaders by The Network of Leaders of the Adolfo Ibáñez University.

== Political career ==
In the mid-2010s, Bernales joined the Vlado Mirosevic's Liberal Party of Chile, a center-left party that later was a founding member of the Broad Front.

In November 2017, for the parliamentary elections, Bernales was elected deputy for the 2018−2022 period representing District 26 of Calbuco, Cochamó, Maullín, Puerto Montt, Ancud, Castro, Chaitén, Chonchi, Curaco de Vélez, Dalcahue, Futaleufú, Hualaihué, Palena, Puqueldón, Queilén, Quellón, Quemchi, Quinchao. He obtained 6.194 votes, corresponding to a 4.50% of the total. Despite being part of a mostly leftist coalition, Bernales claimed to represent centrist politics.

During the 2018−2022 period, Bernales integrated the following permanent commissions: 1) Culture, Arts and Communications; 2) Economy, Development, Micro, Small and Medium Enterprises; and 3) Consumer Protection and Tourism. On the other hand, he was a member of the Special Investigative Commission on the ANFP frauds during Sergio Jadue's spell.
