= Jaime Sáez Quiroz =

Chilean politician (born 1985)

Jaime Bello
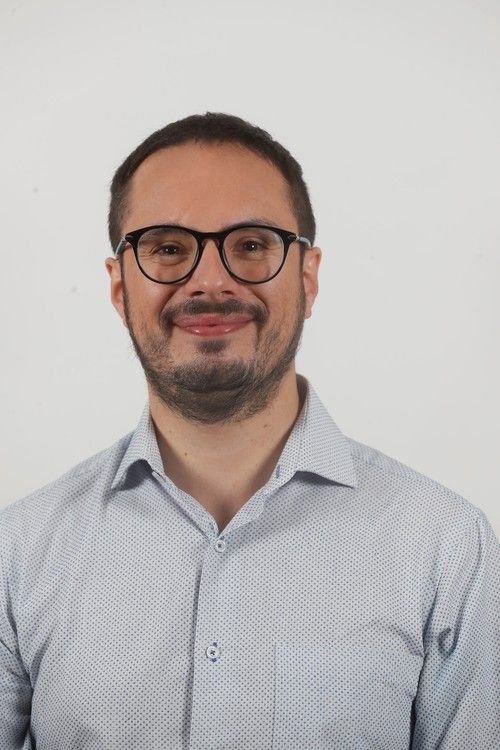

Member of the Chamber of Deputies of Chile
- In office 11 March 2022 – 11 March 2026
- Constituency: District 26

Personal details
- Born: 9 December 1985 (age 40) Santiago, Chile
- Party: Democratic Revolution (RD)
- Children: One
- Education: Austral University of Chile
- Profession: Public Administrator

Jaime Salvador Sáez Quiroz is a hotel manager, public administrator, environmental activist and Chilean politician, activist of the Democratic Revolution (RD).

== Biography ==
=== Family, studies and work life ===
He studied International Hotel Management at Inacap in Valdivia and has worked most of his life in this field. He has a master's degree in Human Scale Development and Ecological Economics from the Faculty of Economic and Administrative Sciences of the Universidad Austral de Chile. He recently graduated as a Public Administrator from the San Sebastián University. He also worked as an independent consultant in organizational development, business management advice, development support and the management of rural women's organizations.

=== Political career ===
He has been a member of the Democratic Revolution since the beginning of the party and was a participant in the creation of the Frente Amplio in the Los Lagos region. As an activist he has participated in various environmental movements.

In 2020, he ventured for the first time as a candidate in a popular vote, in the Frente Amplio gubernatorial primaries for the Los Lagos region. He obtained the nomination, defeating Pamela Leal, Comunes candidate, by a narrow margin. Finally, in the 2021 gubernatorial elections he obtained 9.26% of the votes, finishing in last place.

In 2021, he ran as a candidate for deputy for district No. 26 for the parliamentary elections of that year, on the Apruebo Dignidad list and representing the DR. During the campaign he signed a commitment to legislate in favor of the protection of the biodiversity of the Chiloé archipelago. He managed to be elected with 4,776 votes, equivalent to 3.2% of the total votes.

He assumed the position of deputy on March 11, 2022, and currently chairs the permanent commission of Public Works, Transportation and Telecommunications and is a member of the Environment and Natural Resources commissions; and Extreme Zones and Chilean Antarctica. He is part of the Frente Amplio bench.
