= Gabriel Ascencio =

Chilean politician (born 1953)

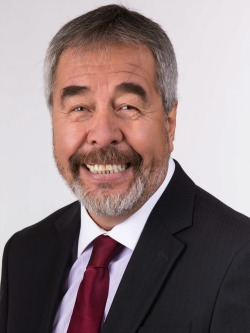
- Official portrait (2018)

Member of the Chamber of Deputies
- In office 11 March 2018 – 11 March 2022
- Preceded by: District created
- Constituency: District 26
- In office 11 March 1994 – 11 March 2014
- Preceded by: Dionisio Faulbaum
- Succeeded by: Jenny Álvarez
- Constituency: 58th District

Personal details
- Born: 25 October 1953 (age 73) Coyhaique, Chile
- Party: Christian Democracy
- Spouse: Martha Bayona
- Education: University of Chile (BA)
- Occupation: Politician
- Profession: Lawyer

Gabriel Héctor Ascencio Mansilla (born 8 July 1953) is a Chilean politician and lawyer who served as deputy of his country.

In 2021, he announced his retirement of the Chamber of Deputies of Chile.
