= Quíquel =

Coordinates: 42.358°S 73.5912°W

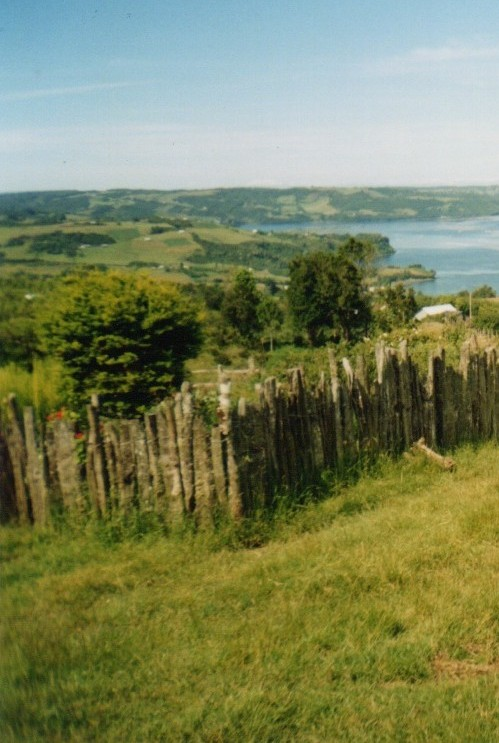
View of Quíquel

Quíquel is a rural area in the Dalcahue commune, on Chiloé Island in the Los Lagos Region of Chile. The area is located about 7 km. north of the port town of Dalcahue. Its inhabitants work mainly in the salmon farming and seafood industry. The area is surrounded by native forests.
