= Palena Province =

Palena Province Provincia de Palena
- Province
- Seal

- Location in the Los Lagos Region

- Location in Chile
- Coordinates: 43°00′S 72°20′W
- Country: Chile
- Region: Los Lagos
- Capital: Futaleufú
- Communes: Chaitén; Futaleufú; Hualaihué; Palena

Government
  - Type: Provincial
  - Governor: Osvalo Oelckers Oelckers (UDI)

Area
  - Total: 15,301.9 km^{2} (5,908.1 sq mi)

Population (2012 Census)
  - Total: 16,137
  - Density: 1.0546/km^{2} (2.7313/sq mi)
  - Urban: 7,624
  - Rural: 11,347

Sex
  - Men: 10,255
  - Women: 8,716
- Time zone: UTC-4 (CLT)
  - Summer (DST): UTC-3 (CLT)
- Area code: 56 + 65
- Website: Government of Palena

Palena Province (Spanish: Provincia de Palena) is the southernmost administrative area in Chile's Los Lagos Region (X). The area is also called Continental Chiloe or Northern Patagonia, as geographers consider the Palena Province to be the starting point of Chilean Patagonia which extends south from Palena all the way to Tierra del Fuego. Palena Province is remote, beautiful, and difficult to access. In fact, Palena is one of the most sparsely populated provinces in the country and features a stunning geography characterized by steep fjords, wild rivers, hot springs, and numerous snow-capped volcanoes. Chile's Austral Highway (Carretera Austral) is not continuous through the jagged geography of Palena Province. Motorists accessing the area by car are required to take two ferries across fjords to cross the province.

Historically, Chaiten was the provincial capital. Due to the eruption of Chaitén Volcano and the subsequent destruction of that town, Futaleufú was named the new provincial capital in March 2009. Major tourist attractions in Palena Province include the Pumalín Park, one of the largest established wilderness protection areas in the world, Yelcho Lake, and the Futaleufu River. Pumalin was the dream of the late US philanthropist and environmental activist Douglas Tompkins, it is nowadays called the Pumalin Douglas Tompkins national park after its founder. The park has excellent infrastructure for camping and is divided into two parts by the Huinay Ranch. Yelcho Lake is considered a prime destination for fly fishing. The Futaleufu River is considered by specialized media to be one of the three greatest whitewater runs in the world.

Due to its location in front of Chiloé Island Palena Province is sometimes called Continental Chiloé (Chiloé Continental). Palena Province is named after the Palena Lake, which in turn was named by the Italian Jesuit Nicolás Mascardi after the town of Palena in Abruzzo, Italy.

== Administration ==
As a province, Palena is a second-level administrative division, governed by a provincial governor appointed by the president. The province comprises four communes, each governed by a municipality, headed by an alcalde.

=== Communes ===
- Chaitén
- Futaleufú
- Hualaihué
- Palena

== Geography and demography ==
According to the 2002 census by the National Statistics Institute (INE), the province spans an area of 15,301.9 km^{2} (5,908 sq mi) and had a population of 18,971 inhabitants (10,255 men and 8,716 women), giving it a population density of 1.2/km^{2} (3/sq mi). It is the seventh least populated province in the country. Of these, 7,624 (40.2%) lived in urban areas and 11,347 (59.8%) in rural areas. Between the 1992 and 2002 censuses, the population grew by 1.2% (223 persons).
