= Futaleufú, Chile =

Futaleufú
- Town and Commune
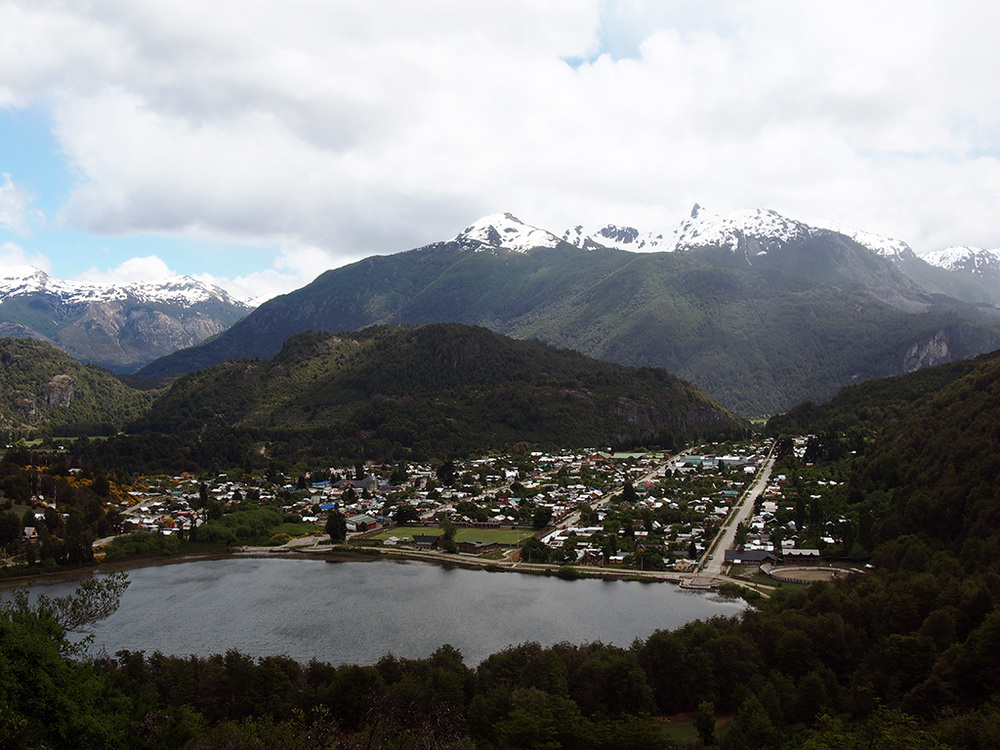

- Flag Coat of arms Location of Futaleufú commune in Los Lagos Region Location in Chile
- Nickname: "Futa"
- Coordinates: 43°11′0″S 71°52′0″W
- Country: Chile
- Region: Los Lagos
- Province: Palena

Government
  - Type: Municipality
  - Alcalde: Arturo Carvallo Pardo (DC)

Area
  - Total: 1,280.0 km^{2} (494.2 sq mi)
- Elevation: 353 m (1,158 ft)

Population (2012 Census)
  - Total: 2,297
  - Density: 1.795/km^{2} (4.648/sq mi)
  - Urban: 1,153
  - Rural: 673

Sex
  - Men: 954
  - Women: 872
- Area code: 56 + 65
- Climate: Cfb
- Website: Municipality of Futaleufú

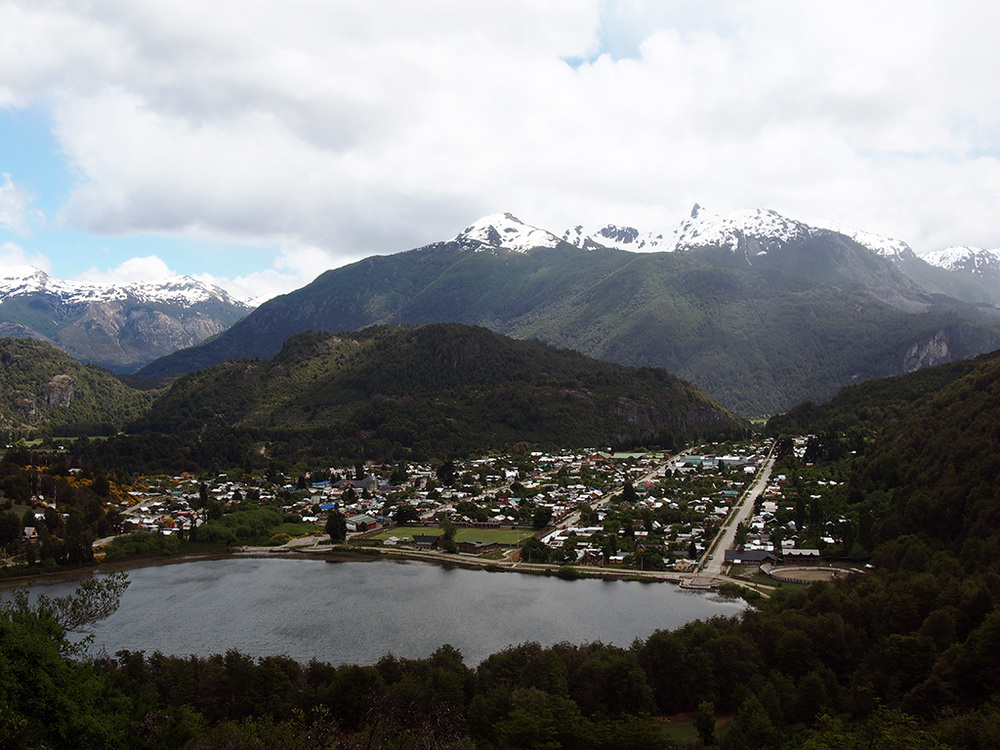
The town of Futaleufu and Laguna Espejo at the foot of Sierra Teta

Futaleufú is a Chilean town and commune located in Northern Patagonia. Located at the confluence of the Espolon and Futaleufú river valleys, the town is approximately 10 kilometers from the Argentine border. Futaleufú is the provincial capital of Palena Province, Los Lagos Region. Futaleufú, known locally as “Futa,” is a frontier town with a growing tourism industry based on adventure tourism—most specifically whitewater rafting—but also fishing, mountain biking, trekking, and canyoning. Due to its proximity to the Argentine border, Futaleufú is most easily accessed from airports in Esquel and Bariloche, Argentina. Other tourists access the town through the Northern Patagonia Airport in Chaiten, or vía a system of ferries that leave from the closest major Chilean city, Puerto Montt.

The town is named after the Futaleufú River, widely considered to be one of the best whitewater rafting rivers in the world. The name Futaleufu derives from a Mapudungun word meaning 'Big River'.

The town has a population of about 2,000, growing slightly during the summer rafting and kayaking season. The main income for the community is whitewater kayaking and rafting, together with fly fishing and other associated outdoor sports. Many original residents raise sheep, cattle and practice small scale subsistence farming. A gravel road links the town to Trevelin in Argentina and to the Carretera Austral. It is served by Futaleufú Airfield.

Following the eruption of Chaitén Volcano and the subsequent destruction of Chaitén, Futaleufú has been the administrative capital of Palena Province since March 2009.

== Climate ==
Futaleufú has an oceanic climate (Köppen climate classification Cfb) with some drying trend in summer. Winters are cool and wet but mild with a July average of 3.6 °C (38.5 °F). During this time of the year, precipitation is very high, averaging around 253 to 301 millimetres (10 to 12 in) from June to August and humidity is high, averaging around 77–86%. Few days are dry in winter, since there are 18–19 days with measurable precipitation from June to August. Snowfalls occur in most years though prolonged snowfall events are uncommon. Summers are drier and mild with a January average of 16.8 °C (62.2 °F) and during this time, precipitation is lower, averaging 81.1 millimetres (3.2 in) in February, the driest month. However, precipitation during the summer months are highly variable; in some years, many days can go without a day of precipitation such as the case in 1987 when only 9.9 millimetres (0.39 in) of precipitation was recorded in January while in other years, some monthly precipitation can exceed 300 millimetres (12 in) such as in January 1974. Temperatures can occasionally exceed 20 °C (68 °F) any time between September and May. The average annual precipitation is 2,081.2 millimetres (81.94 in) and there are 169 days with measureable precipitation although this can vary widely from year to year, ranging from a high of 3,536.8 millimetres (139.24 in) in 1971 to a low of only 1,159.3 millimetres (45.64 in) in 1998. The record high was 37.0 °C (98.6 °F) in December 1956 and the record low was −11.2 °C (11.8 °F) in July 2007.

Climate data for Futaleufú, Chile (1991-2020, extremes 1953-present)
Month	Jan	Feb	Mar	Apr	May	Jun	Jul	Aug	Sep	Oct	Nov	Dec	Year
Record high °C (°F)	36.4 (97.5)	36.4 (97.5)	34.9 (94.8)	25.0 (77.0)	20.8 (69.4)	21.8 (71.2)	17.4 (63.3)	24.2 (75.6)	26.7 (80.1)	28.2 (82.8)	35.0 (95.0)	37.0 (98.6)	37.0 (98.6)
Mean daily maximum °C (°F)	23.9 (75.0)	24.0 (75.2)	21.9 (71.4)	17.7 (63.9)	12.4 (54.3)	8.1 (46.6)	8.1 (46.6)	10.6 (51.1)	15.6 (60.1)	17.7 (63.9)	19.9 (67.8)	22.2 (72.0)	16.8 (62.2)
Daily mean °C (°F)	15.5 (59.9)	15.4 (59.7)	13.2 (55.8)	9.7 (49.5)	6.6 (43.9)	4.0 (39.2)	3.3 (37.9)	5.1 (41.2)	7.3 (45.1)	9.6 (49.3)	11.9 (53.4)	14.0 (57.2)	9.6 (49.3)
Mean daily minimum °C (°F)	8.3 (46.9)	7.5 (45.5)	5.3 (41.5)	3.2 (37.8)	1.4 (34.5)	0.3 (32.5)	−1.0 (30.2)	−0.7 (30.7)	−0.1 (31.8)	2.9 (37.2)	4.7 (40.5)	6.6 (43.9)	3.2 (37.8)
Record low °C (°F)	−0.2 (31.6)	−0.5 (31.1)	−2.2 (28.0)	−4.9 (23.2)	−7.7 (18.1)	−10.7 (12.7)	−11.2 (11.8)	−9.9 (14.2)	−10.4 (13.3)	−5.1 (22.8)	−1.7 (28.9)	−0.3 (31.5)	−11.2 (11.8)
Average precipitation mm (inches)	103.5 (4.07)	67.7 (2.67)	114.2 (4.50)	173.6 (6.83)	241.7 (9.52)	309.8 (12.20)	257.6 (10.14)	263.0 (10.35)	149.9 (5.90)	151.8 (5.98)	124.8 (4.91)	113.1 (4.45)	2,070.7 (81.52)
Average precipitation days (≥ 1.0 mm)	7.0	6.3	9.0	11.3	14.3	17.2	14.9	15.5	10.5	11.0	8.5	8.4	134.0
Average relative humidity (%)	59	60	65	73	82	86	84	77	70	64	61	60	70
Source 1: Dirección Meteorológica de Chile (humidity 1970–2000)
Source 2: NOAA (precipitation days 1991–2020)

== Demographics ==
Historical population
Year	Pop.	±% p.a.
1970	2,402	—
1982	1,809	−2.34%
1992	1,735	−0.42%
2002	1,826	+0.51%
2017	2,623	+2.44%
2024	3,062	+2.24%
Source: "Censo de Población y Vivienda". National Statistics Institute.

According to the 2002 census of the National Statistics Institute, Futaleufú spans an area of 1,280 km^{2} (494 sq mi) and has 1,826 inhabitants (954 men and 872 women). Of these, 1,153 (63.1%) lived in urban areas and 673 (36.9%) in rural areas. The population grew by 5.2% (91 persons) between the 1992 and 2002 censuses.

As a border town, many families are of mixed Chilean and Argentine heritage. Tourism is also changing the demographic composition of Futaleufú as young families from Santiago, Argentina, Brazil, Western Europe and North America have immigrated in recent years.

== Administration ==
As a commune, Futaleufú is a third-level administrative division of Chile administered by a municipal council and led by an alcalde who is directly elected every four years. Since 2018, the alcalde has been Fernando Grandón Domke.

Within the electoral divisions of Chile, Futaleufú is represented in the Chamber of Deputies by Gabriel Ascencio (PDC) and Alejandro Santana (RN) as part of the 58th electoral district together with Castro, Ancud, Quemchi, Dalcahue, Curaco de Vélez, Quinchao, Puqueldón, Chonchi, Queilén, Quellón, Chaitén, Hualaihué and Palena. The commune is represented in the Senate by Rabindranath Quinteros (PS) and Iván Moreira (UDI), as part of the 17th senatorial constituency (Los Lagos Region).

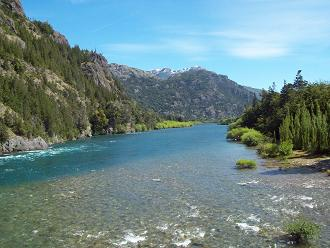
The Futaleufú River the border of Chile and Argentina

== Landscape and attractions ==
The Futaleufú River is commonly rated by specialized media as one of the best rivers in the world for kayaking and rafting. The river flows in from Argentina, through the town, and empties into the fjord-shaped Yelcho Lake. Day trips and multi-day trips are available on "the Futa" while several of its tributaries, such as the Espolón River, Rio Chico, and the Azul (Blue) River, can be rafted, canoed, or navigated by boat.

Lonconao Lake, which is fed by aquifers and not glaciers, is best for swimming and water sports. Yelcho and Espolón Lakes are larger, glacially fed, and offer world-class fly fishing. Both larger lakes feature remote landscapes such as waterfalls, remote bays, and old growth forests which are inaccessible by road, so boating and kayaking are highly recommended. Fly fishing is also possible on the Futaleufú River, the Rio Chico, the Yelcho River (the largest river in the Futaleufú Valley) and the Espolon River, which is the largest tributary of the Futaleufú and contains brown trout and rainbow trout, as well as salmon in April and May.

Other nearby attractions include the Futaleufú National Reserve, known for its population of Huemul (South Andean deer), Queulat National Park, and Pumalín Park. Pumalin was once Chile's largest private nature reserve, but has since been absorbed by the national park system and renamed to honor its founder, American environmentalist and founder of The North Face, Douglas Tompkins.

Queulat is one of Chile's national parks, famous for its hanging glacier and diverse old growth rain forests. Pumalin, now renamed Douglas Tompkins Pumalín National Park, is a large reserve with many trails, campgrounds, and visitor centres.

La Hoya, an Argentine ski resort with 2000 feet of vertical drop and one of the longest ski seasons in South America, is a 70-minute drive from Futaleufú. Another attraction across the Argentine border is Los Alerces National Park, a UNESCO protected reserve which features the Futaleufu River headwaters and one of the oldest Alerce forests in the world, with trees up to 2,600 years old.

Canyoning and rappelling is also possible in the Futaleufú valley, with its numerous ravines and waterfalls, as well as horse riding and mountain biking.
