= Hualaihué =

- Commune
- Location of Hualaihué commune in Los Lagos Region Location in Chile
- Coordinates: 42°6′0″S 72°25′0″W
- Country: Chile
- Region: Los Lagos
- Province: Palena
- Seat: Hornopirén

Government
  - Type: Municipality
  - Alcalde: Freddy Ibacache Muñoz (PPD)

Area
  - Total: 2,787.7 km^{2} (1,076.3 sq mi)
- Elevation: 602 m (1,975 ft)

Population (2012 Census)
  - Total: 8,720
  - Density: 3.13/km^{2} (8.10/sq mi)
  - Urban: 2,406
  - Rural: 5,867

Sex
  - Men: 4,457
  - Women: 3,816
- Time zone: UTC-4 (CLT)
  - Summer (DST): UTC-3 (CLST)
- Area code: 56 + 65
- Climate: Cfb
- Website: Municipality of Hualaihué

Hualaihué (Spanish pronunciation: [walajˈwe]) is a Chilean commune located in Palena Province, Los Lagos Region. The communal capital is the town of Hornopirén.

== Demographics ==
Historical population
Year	Pop.	±% p.a.
1970	5,624	—
1982	6,302	+0.95%
1992	8,104	+2.55%
2002	8,273	+0.21%
2017	8,944	+0.52%
2024	9,480	+0.83%
Source: "Censo de Población y Vivienda". National Statistics Institute.

According to the 2002 census of the National Statistics Institute, Hualaihué spans an area of 2,787.7 km^{2} (1,076 sq mi) and has 8,273 inhabitants (4,457 men and 3,816 women). Of these, 2,406 (29.1%) lived in urban areas and 5,867 (70.9%) in rural areas. The population grew by 2.1% (169 persons) between the 1992 and 2002 censuses.

== Administration ==
As a commune, Hualaihué is a third-level administrative division of Chile administered by a municipal council, headed by an alcalde who is directly elected every four years. The 2008-2012 alcalde is Freddy Ibacache Muñoz (PPD).

Within the electoral divisions of Chile, Hualaihué is represented in the Chamber of Deputies by Gabriel Ascencio (PDC) and Alejandro Santana (RN) as part of the 58th electoral district, together with Castro, Ancud, Quemchi, Dalcahue, Curaco de Vélez, Quinchao, Puqueldón, Chonchi, Queilén, Quellón, Chaitén, Futaleufú and Palena. The commune is represented in the Senate by Camilo Escalona Medina (PS) and Carlos Kuschel Silva (RN) as part of the 17th senatorial constituency (Los Lagos Region).
