= Curaco de Vélez =

- Commune
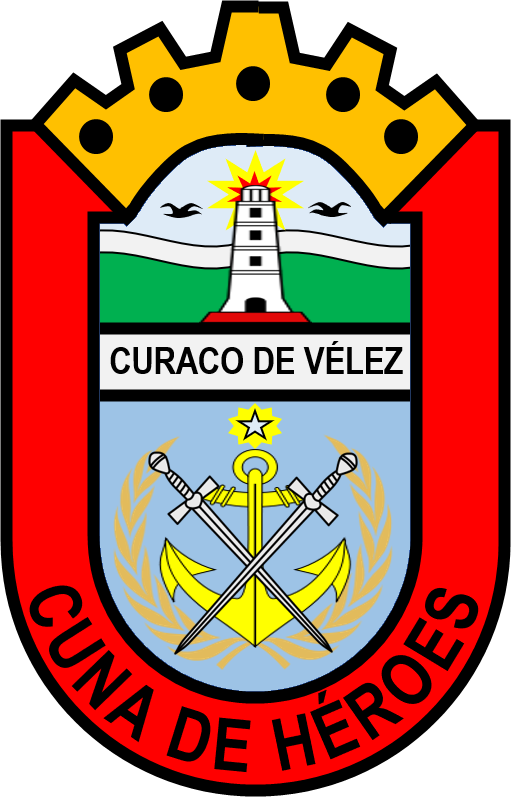
- Coat of arms Location of the Commune of Curaco de Vélez in Los Lagos Region Location in Chile
- Coordinates (commune): 42°26′S 73°35′W
- Country: Chile
- Region: Los Lagos
- Province: Chiloé

Government
  - Type: Municipality
  - Alcalde: Luis Curumilla Sotomayor (DC)

Area
  - Total: 80.0 km^{2} (30.9 sq mi)
- Elevation: 79 m (259 ft)

Population (2012 Census)
  - Total: 3,584
  - Density: 44.8/km^{2} (116/sq mi)
  - Urban: 0
  - Rural: 3,403

Sex
  - Men: 1,642
  - Women: 1,761
- Area code: 56 + 65
- Website: Municipality of Curaco de Vélez

Curaco de Vélez is a Chilean commune in Chiloé Archipelago which is part of Chiloé Province and Los Lagos Region. The commune is located in western Quinchao Island while the eastern part is administered by the commune of Quinchao.

== History ==
Curaco is proud of its association with several famous Chilean sailors. From the War of the Pacific are Admiral Galvarino Riveros and Rear Admiral Manuel Oyarzún. Also remembered is Carlos Miller Norton navigator of the Goleta Ancud that took possession of the Straights of Magellan in 1843 for Chile. Hydrographer and explorer Francisco Hudson was also native to the town.

Galvarino Riveros Cárdenas was born in Changüitad. In his career he cruised the entire coastline of Chile caring out many delicate and important missions. He served the country with distinction in the War of the Pacific (1879).

On 13 and 15 January 1881, in command of his squadron, Riveros provided protective fire for the army assault that defeated the Peruvian forces leading to the surrender of Lima and Callao.

== Architecture ==
In 1660 the Jesuits noted simple dwellings here. The first haphazard buildings were of timber and straw. By 1724 the population was 262 made up of 33 families. By the beginning of the 20th century it had not grown much and the settlement was small and poor without streets or landing places. In 1901 Bishop Ramón Angel Jara created the parish and took up the task of giving it a structure that would allow for future growth.

Churches dating from the 18th and 19th century reflect a strong faith. These are constructed of timber from the noble alerce and cypress trees.

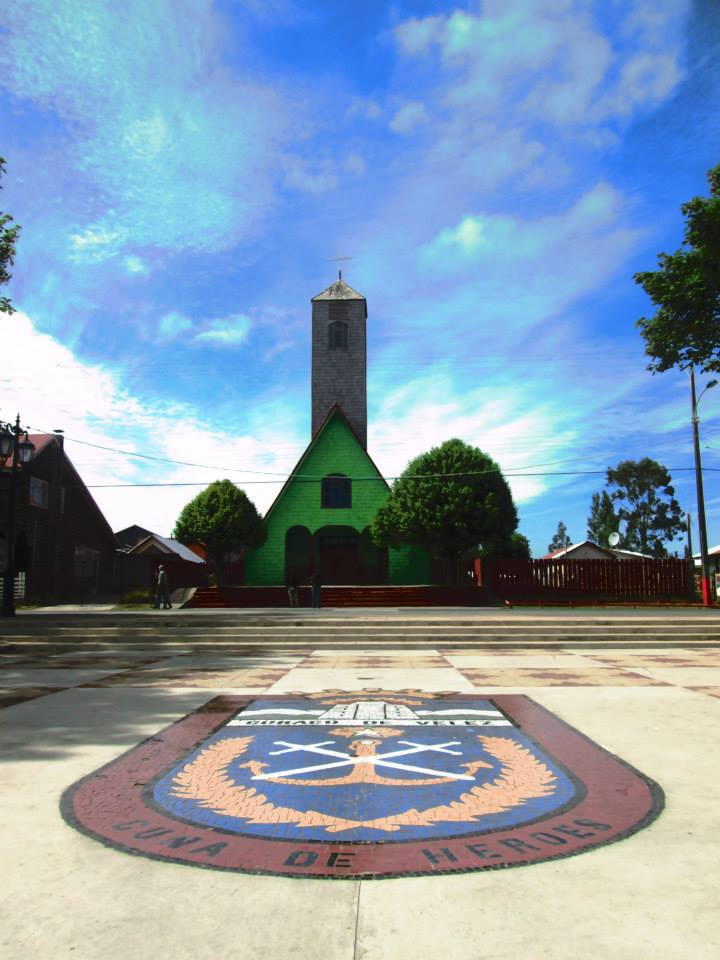
Church of Curaco de Vélez with the coat of arms in the square.

== Demographics ==
Historical population
Year	Pop.	±% p.a.
1875	2,950	—
1885	3,484	+1.68%
1895	3,871	+1.06%
1907	1,259	−8.94%
1920	4,678	+10.62%
1930	4,031	−1.48%
1940	3,938	−0.23%
1952	4,200	+0.54%
1970	3,525	−0.97%
1982	3,055	−1.19%
1992	3,021	−0.11%
2002	3,403	+1.20%
2017	3,829	+0.79%
2024	3,662	−0.64%
Source: "Censo de Población y Vivienda". National Statistics Institute.

According to the 2002 census of the National Statistics Institute, Curaco de Vélez spans an area of 80 km^{2} (31 sq mi) and has 3,403 inhabitants (1,642 men and 1,761 women), making the commune an entirely rural area. The population grew by 12.6% (382 persons) between the 1992 and 2002 censuses.

== Administration ==
As a commune, Curaco de Vélez is a third-level administrative division of Chile administered by a municipal council, headed by an alcalde who is directly elected every four years. The 2008-2012 alcalde is Luis Curumilla Sotomayor (PDC).

Within the electoral divisions of Chile, Curaco de Vélez is represented in the Chamber of Deputies by Gabriel Ascencio (PDC) and Alejandro Santana (RN) as part of the 58th electoral district, together with Castro, Ancud, Quemchi, Dalcahue, Quinchao, Puqueldón, Chonchi, Queilén, Quellón, Chaitén, Hualaihué, Futaleufú and Palena. The commune is represented in the Senate by Camilo Escalona Medina (PS) and Carlos Kuschel Silva (RN) as part of the 17th senatorial constituency (Los Lagos Region).
