= Palena, Chile =

Palena Spanish: Palena
- Commune
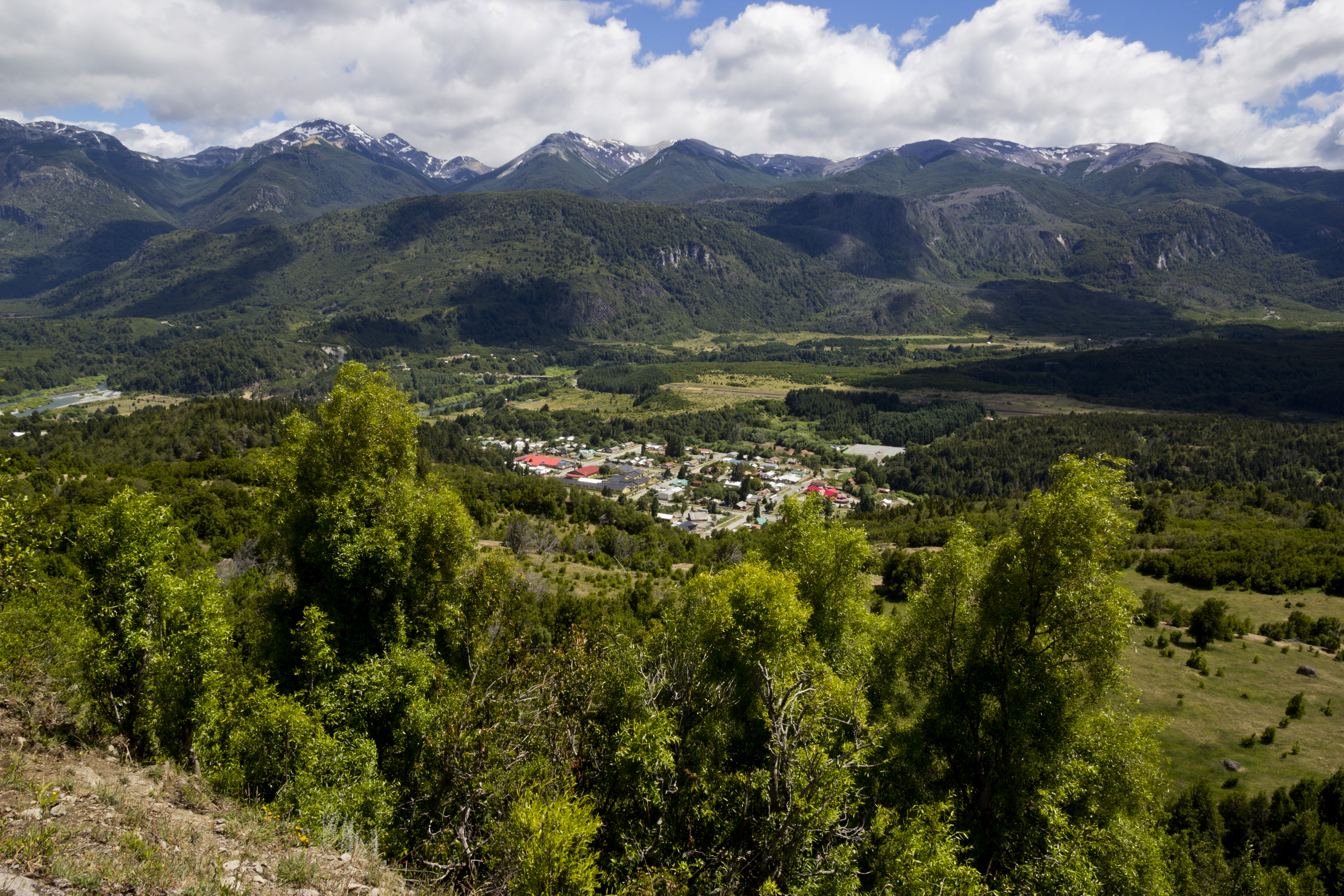
- Palena Chile

- Coat of arms Location of Palena commune in Los Lagos Region Location in Chile
- Coordinates: 43°37′0″S 71°48′0″W
- Country: Chile
- Region: Los Lagos
- Province: Palena

Government
  - Type: Municipality
  - Alcalde: Aladin Delgado Casanova (RN)

Area
  - Total: 2,763.7 km^{2} (1,067.1 sq mi)
- Elevation: 353 m (1,158 ft)

Population (2012 Census)
  - Total: 1,773
  - Density: 0.6415/km^{2} (1.662/sq mi)
  - Urban: 0
  - Rural: 1,690

Sex
  - Men: 904
  - Women: 786
- Time zone: UTC−04:00 (CLT)
  - Summer (DST): UTC−03:00 (CLST)
- Area code: 56 + 65
- Climate: Cfb
- Website: www.municipalidadpalena.cl

Palena is a Chilean commune located in Palena Province, Los Lagos Region. The commune is named after Palena Lake.

== Demographics ==
Historical population
Year	Pop.	±% p.a.
1970	2,515	—
1982	1,848	−2.54%
1992	1,653	−1.11%
2002	1,690	+0.22%
2017	1,711	+0.08%
2024	1,903	+1.53%
Source: "Censo de Población y Vivienda". National Statistics Institute.

According to the 2002 census of the National Statistics Institute, Palena spans an area of 2,763.7 km^{2} (1,067 sq mi) and has 1,690 inhabitants (904 men and 786 women), making the commune an entirely rural area. The population grew by 2.2% (37 persons) between the 1992 and 2002 censuses.

== Administration ==
As a commune, Palena is a third level administrative division of Chile administered by a municipal council, headed by an alcalde who is directly elected every four years. The 2008-2012 alcalde is Aladin Delgado Casanova (RN).

Within the electoral divisions of Chile, Palena is represented in the Chamber of Deputies by Gabriel Ascencio (PDC) and Alejandro Santana (RN) as part of the 58th electoral district, together with Castro, Ancud, Quemchi, Dalcahue, Curaco de Vélez, Quinchao, Puqueldón, Chonchi, Queilén, Quellón, Chaitén, Hualaihué and Futaleufú. The commune is represented in the Senate by Camilo Escalona Medina (PS) and Carlos Kuschel Silva (RN) as part of the 17th senatorial constituency (Los Lagos Region).

== Climate ==
Climate data for Palena (Alto Palena)
Month	Jan	Feb	Mar	Apr	May	Jun	Jul	Aug	Sep	Oct	Nov	Dec	Year
Mean daily maximum °C (°F)	19.3 (66.7)	19.4 (66.9)	18.3 (64.9)	14.7 (58.5)	10.4 (50.7)	7.6 (45.7)	6.3 (43.3)	8.1 (46.6)	11.3 (52.3)	14.1 (57.4)	16.6 (61.9)	18.3 (64.9)	13.7 (56.7)
Daily mean °C (°F)	14.3 (57.7)	13.7 (56.7)	12.5 (54.5)	9.6 (49.3)	6.7 (44.1)	4.3 (39.7)	3.0 (37.4)	4.1 (39.4)	6.2 (43.2)	8.6 (47.5)	11.0 (51.8)	12.9 (55.2)	8.9 (48.0)
Mean daily minimum °C (°F)	9.1 (48.4)	8.3 (46.9)	7.5 (45.5)	5.7 (42.3)	4.0 (39.2)	1.7 (35.1)	0.8 (33.4)	1.1 (34.0)	2.1 (35.8)	3.8 (38.8)	6.3 (43.3)	8.0 (46.4)	4.9 (40.8)
Average precipitation mm (inches)	93.6 (3.69)	72.9 (2.87)	62.8 (2.47)	132.5 (5.22)	247.9 (9.76)	212.9 (8.38)	284.7 (11.21)	121.2 (4.77)	133.6 (5.26)	98.3 (3.87)	95.2 (3.75)	132.5 (5.22)	1,688.1 (66.47)
Source: Meteorología Interactiva
