= Dalcahue =

- City and Commune
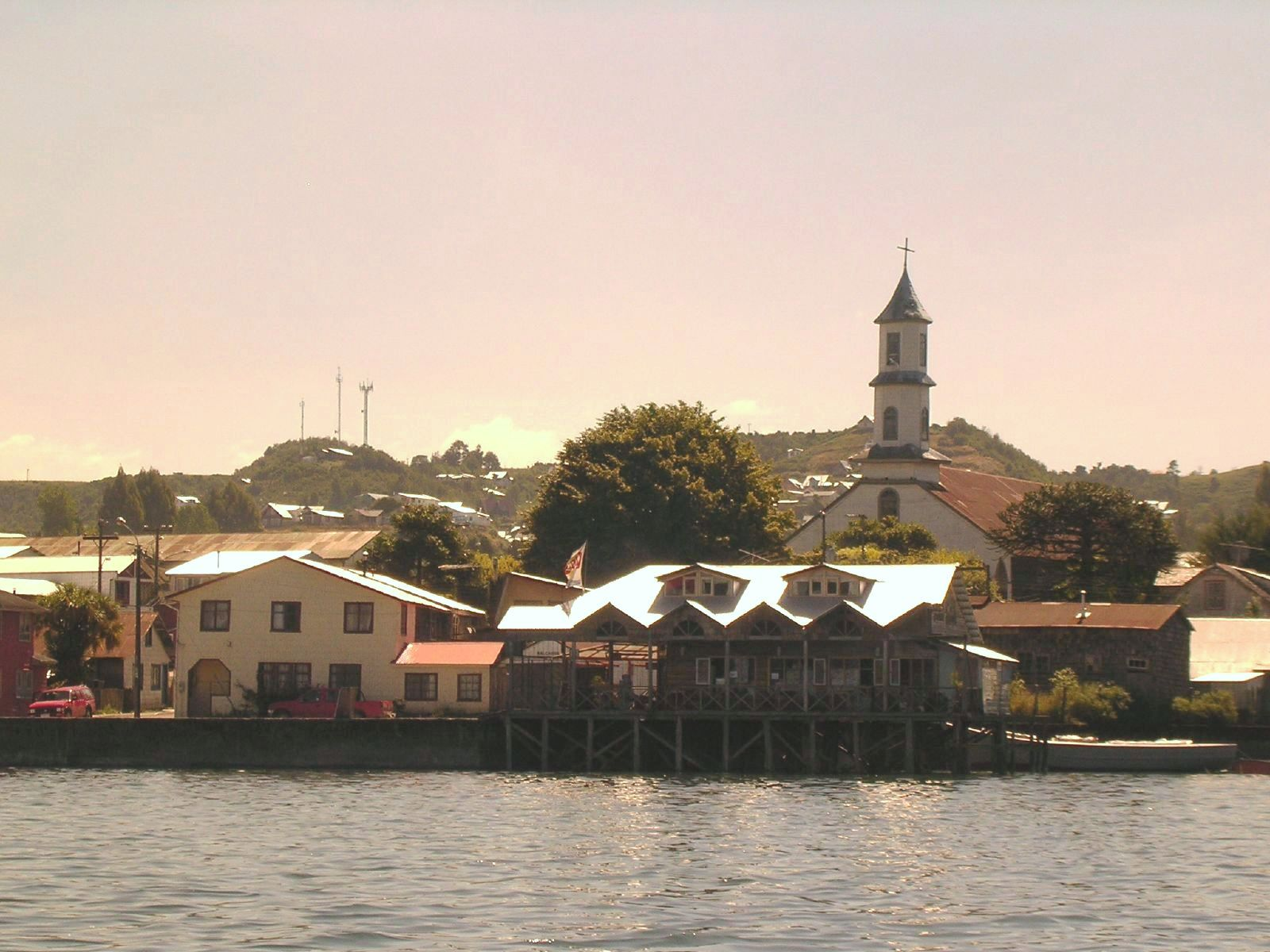
- View of Dalcahue

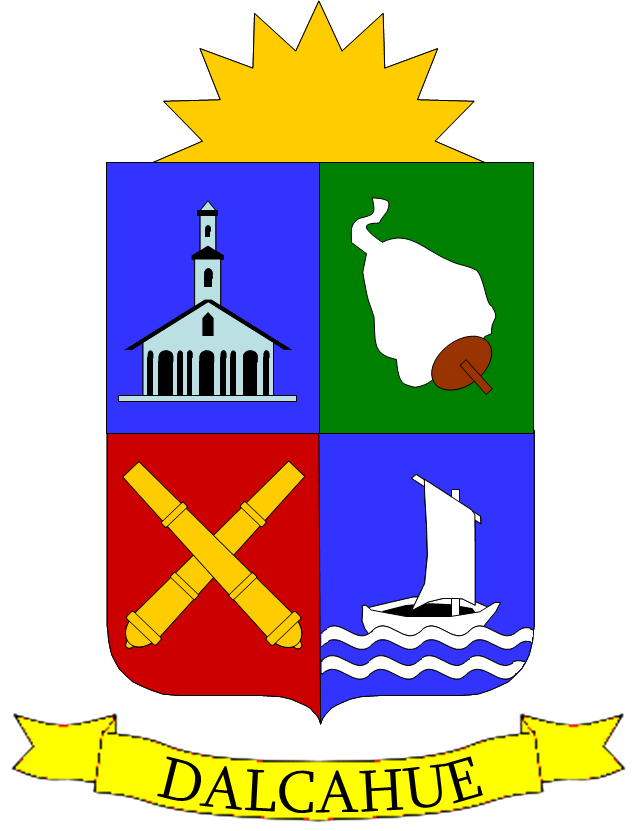
- Coat of arms Map of the Dalcahue commune in the Los Lagos Region Location in Chile
- Coordinates (town): 42°22′45.5″S 73°38′50.1″W
- Country: Chile
- Region: Los Lagos
- Province: Chiloé

Government
  - Type: Municipality
  - Alcalde: Juan Alberto Pérez Muñoz (RN)

Area
  - Total: 1,239.4 km^{2} (478.5 sq mi)
- As of 2002
- Elevation: 1 m (3.3 ft)

Population (2012 Census)
  - Total: 13,076
  - Density: 10.550/km^{2} (27.325/sq mi)
  - Urban: 4,933
  - Rural: 5,760
- Demonym: Dalcahuino

Sex
  - Men: 5,420
  - Women: 5,273
- Time zone: UTC-4 (CLT)
  - Summer (DST): UTC-3 (CLST)
- Area code: 56 + 65
- Website: Municipality of Dalcahue

Dalcahue Spanish pronunciation: [dalˈkawe] is a port city and a commune in Chiloé Province, on Chiloé Island, Los Lagos Region, Chile.

== Demographics ==
Historical population
Year	Pop.	±% p.a.
1875	4,903	—
1885	4,902	−0.00%
1895	5,308	+0.80%
1907	5,842	+0.80%
1920	6,167	+0.42%
1930	6,267	+0.16%
1940	6,542	+0.43%
1952	6,932	+0.48%
1970	6,131	−0.68%
1982	5,848	−0.39%
1992	7,763	+2.87%
2002	10,693	+3.25%
2017	13,762	+1.70%
2024	14,894	+1.14%
Source: "Censo de Población y Vivienda". National Statistics Institute.

According to the 2002 census by the National Statistics Institute, the Dalcachue commune spans an area of 1,239.4 km^{2} (479 sq mi) and had 10,693 inhabitants; of these, 4,933 (46.1%) lived in urban areas and 5,760 (53.9%) in rural areas. At that time, there were 5,420 men and 5,273 women. The population grew by 37.7% (2,931 persons) between the 1992 and 2002 censuses.

== Administration ==
As a commune, Dalcahue is a third-level administrative division of Chile administered by a municipal council, headed by an alcalde who is directly elected every four years. The 2008-2012 alcalde is Alfredo Hurtado Alvarez (PDC).

Within the electoral divisions of Chile, Dalcahue is represented in the Chamber of Deputies by Gabriel Ascencio (PDC) and Alejandro Santana (RN) as part of the 58th electoral district, together with Castro, Ancud, Quemchi, Curaco de Vélez, Quinchao, Puqueldón, Chonchi, Queilén, Quellón, Chaitén, Hualaihué, Futaleufú and Palena. The commune is represented in the Senate by Camilo Escalona Medina (PS) and Carlos Kuschel Silva (RN) as part of the 17th senatorial constituency (Los Lagos Region).

== Transportation ==
The city is served by the Mocopulli Airport that connects the Chiloé island with the rest of Chile

== Gallery ==
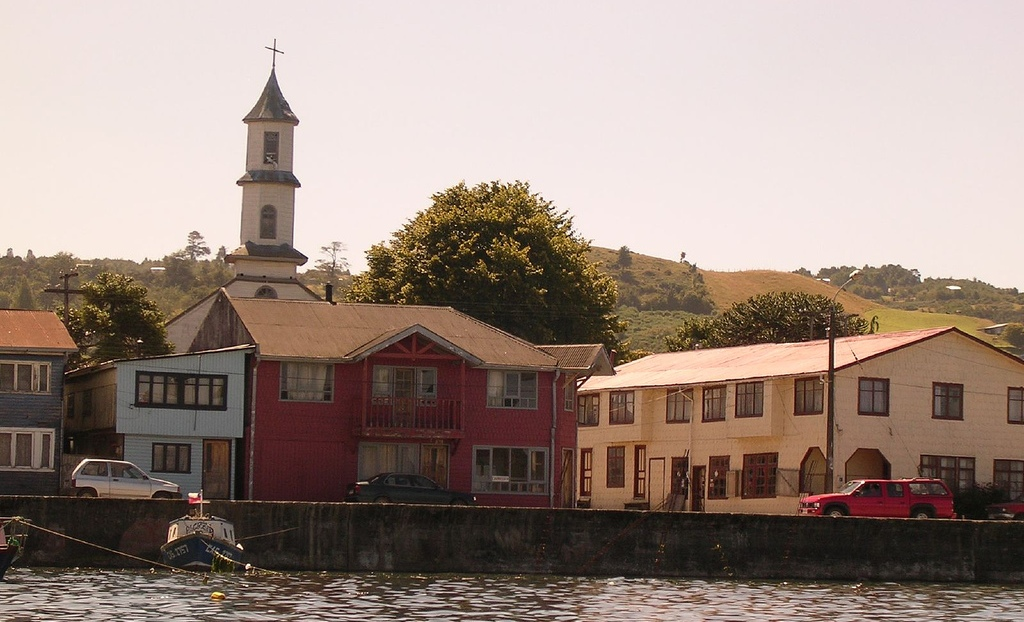
View of Dalcahue

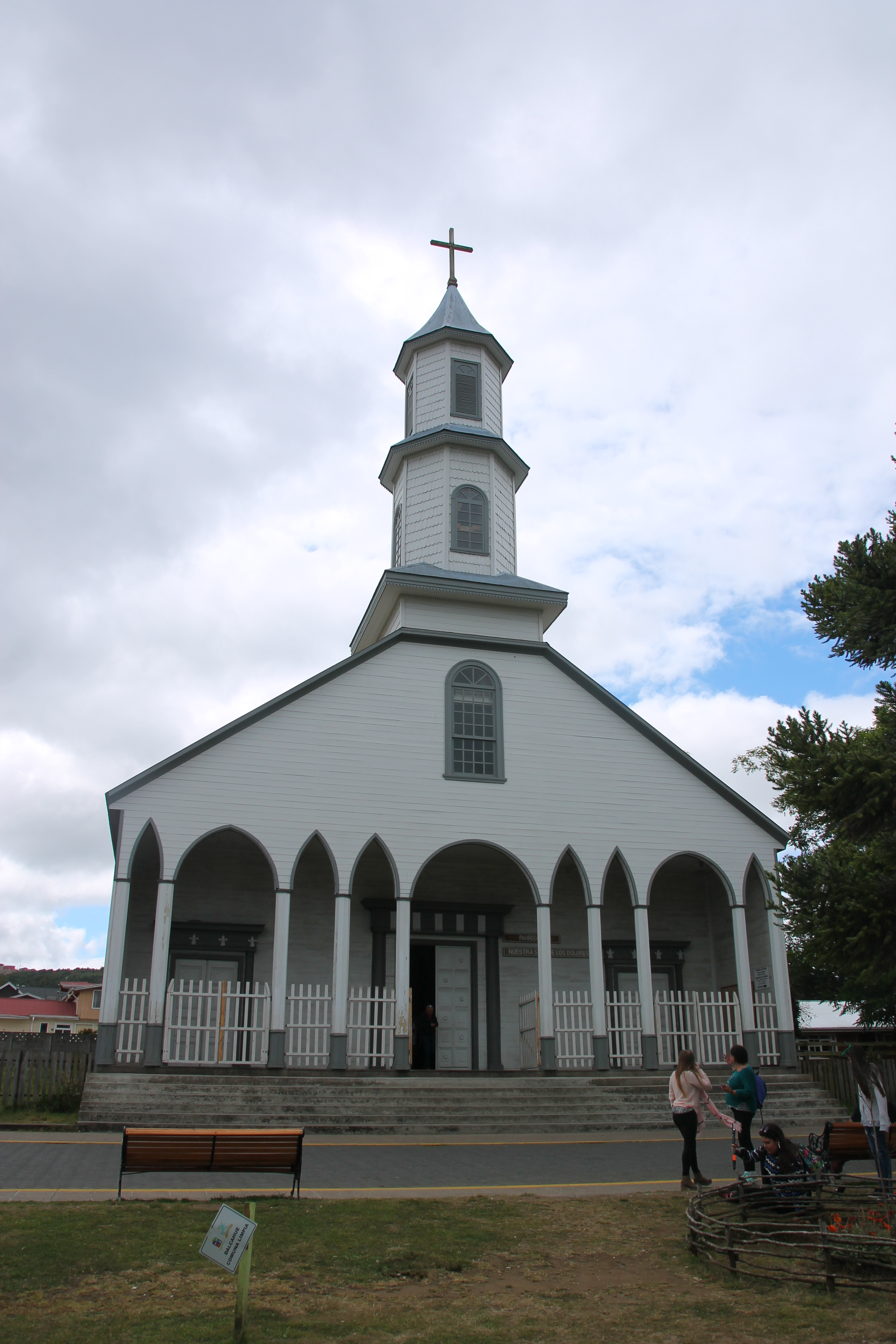
Church of Dalcahue

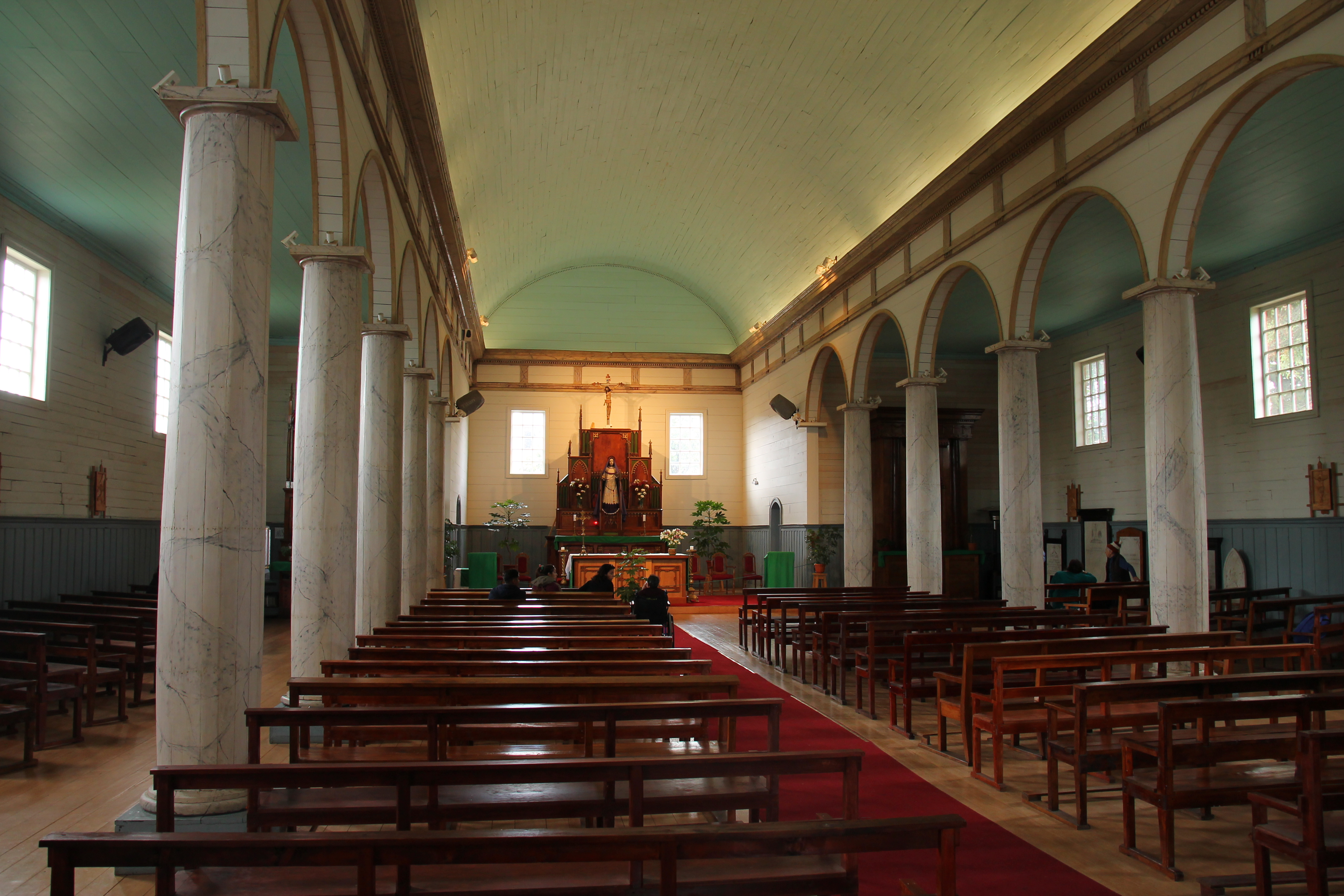
Church interior

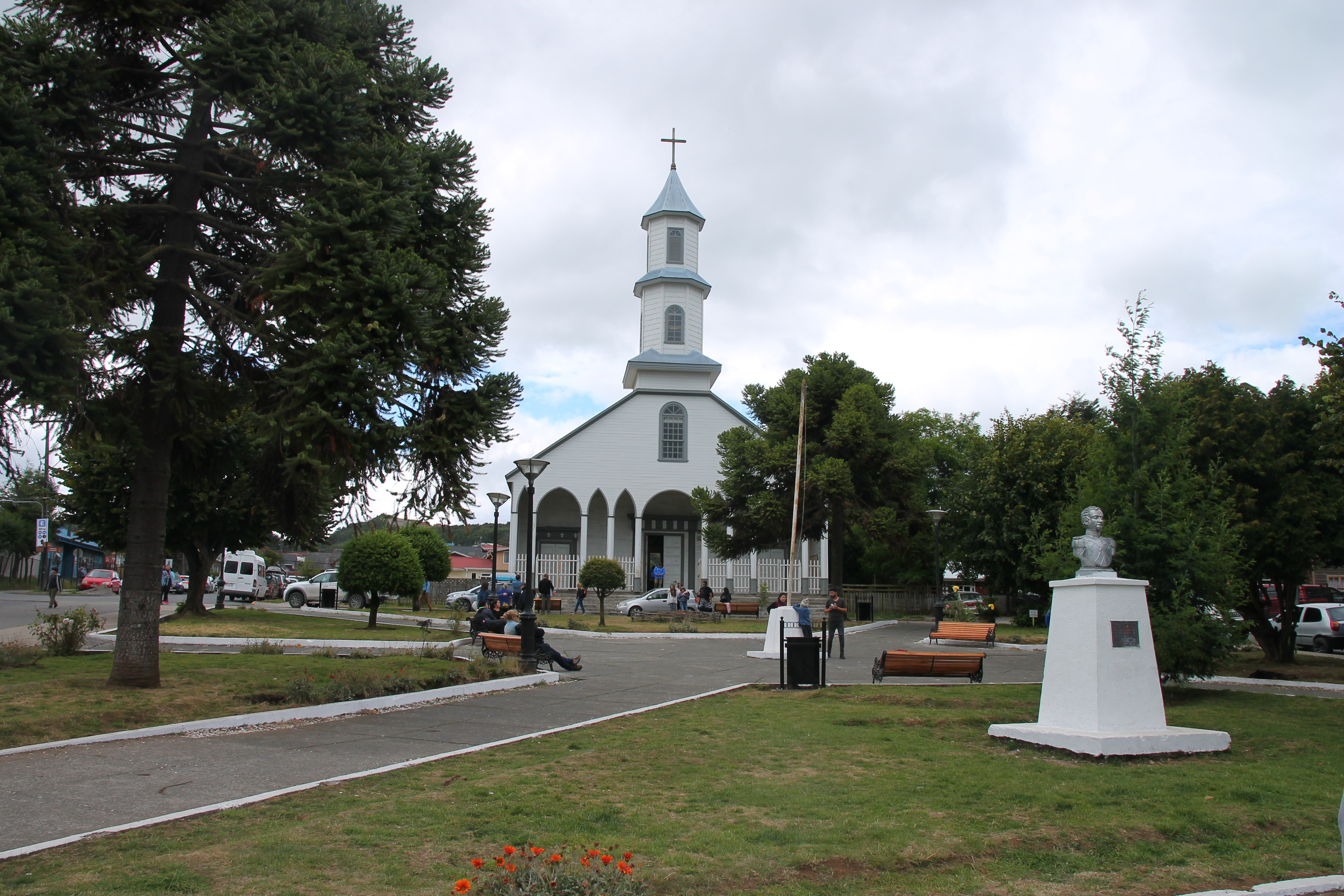
Square in front of the Church

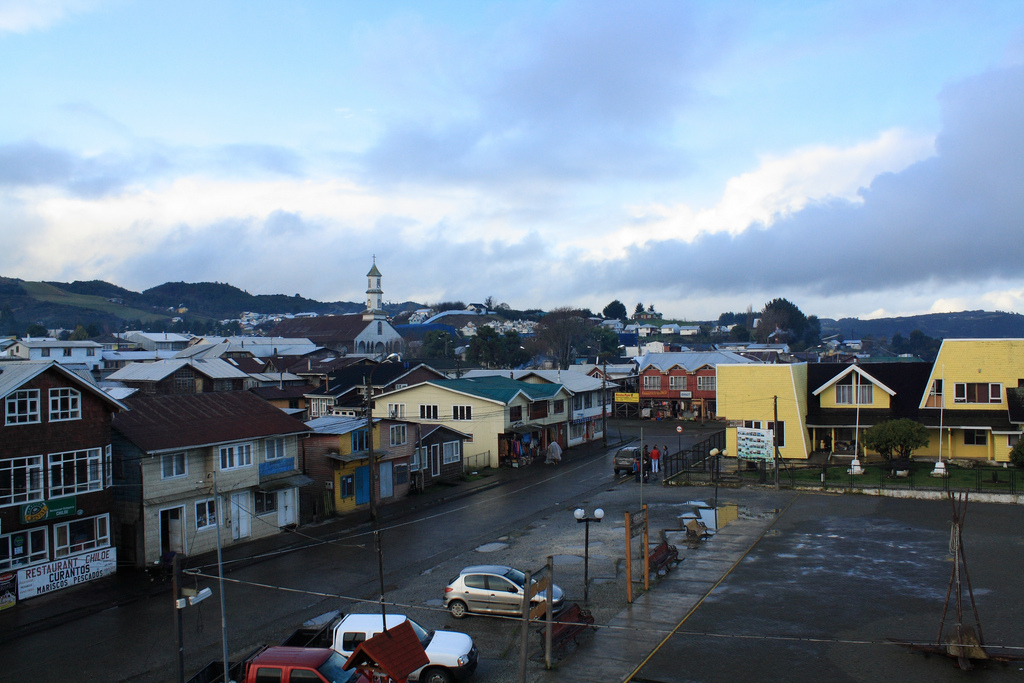
Main Square

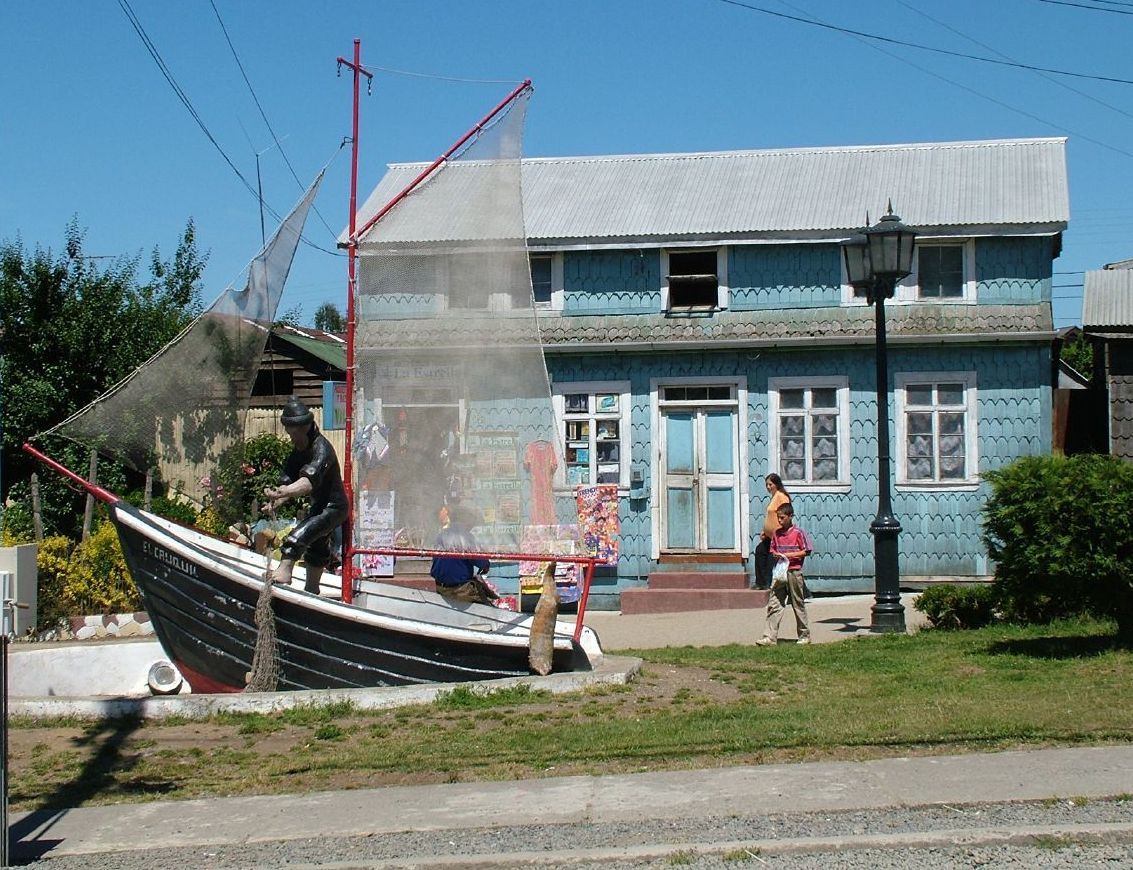
Monument in front of the Church

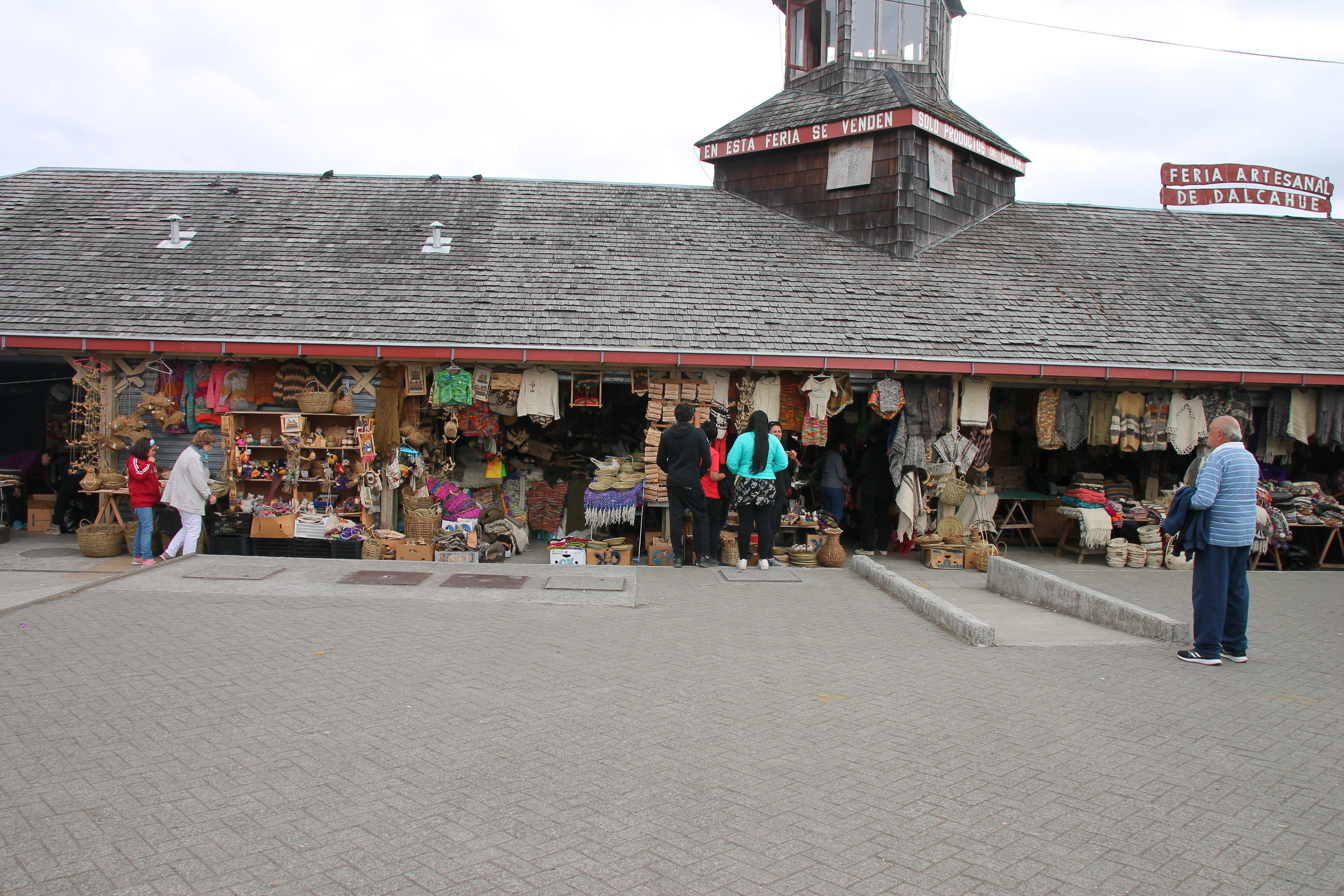
Market

== See also ==
- Quíquel
