= Quemchi =

- Town and Commune
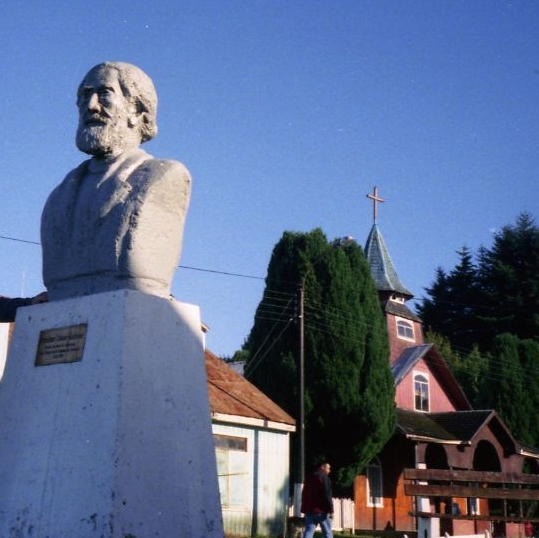

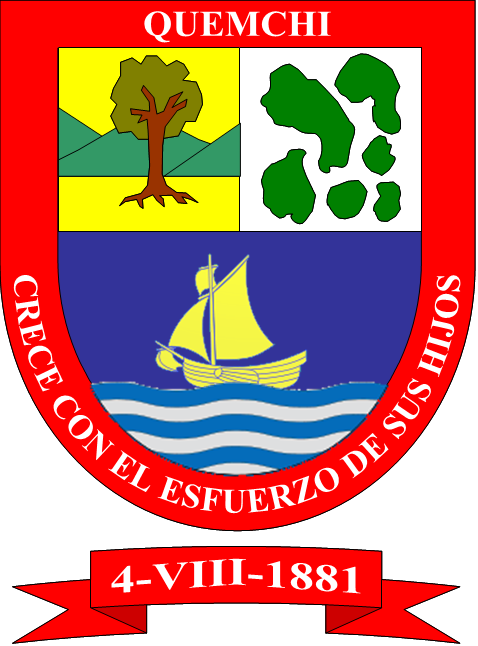
- Coat of arms Location of the Quemchi commune in Los Lagos Region Location in Chile
- Coordinates: 42°09′0″S 73°29′22″W
- Country: Chile
- Region: Los Lagos
- Province: Chiloé
- Founded: 1882

Government
  - Type: Municipality
  - Alcalde: Javier Ugarte (ILC)

Area
  - Total: 440.3 km^{2} (170.0 sq mi)
- Elevation: 5 m (16 ft)

Population (2012 Census)
  - Total: 8,405
  - Density: 19.09/km^{2} (49.44/sq mi)
  - Urban: 1,665
  - Rural: 7,024

Sex
  - Men: 4,525
  - Women: 4,164
- Time zone: UTC-4 (CLT)
  - Summer (DST): UTC-3 (CLST)
- Area code: 56 + 65
- Website: web.archive.org/web/20110119021212/http://www.municipalidadquemchi.cl/

Quemchi is a Chilean town and commune in Los Lagos Region, in Chiloé Province, on the eastern shore of Chiloé Island. It acquired reputation because the famous Chilean writer Francisco Coloane was born near the town.

The town is served by Quemchi Airport.

== History ==
At the end of 1860, Quemchi was set in native forest and the inhabitants lived mainly on shellfish. The population was a mixture of Chileans and Europeans. In 1870 the first barkentine to anchor in the bay brought the English businessman Edwin H. Langdon. Impressed by the beauty of the area and its potential commercial possibilities, he settled on a big block of land purchased from Juan Pablo Tocol. Here he built a house and later the first sawmill in Choen, as well as a store to supply his workers and villagers with provisions. He introduced exotic timbers from North America, Europe and Australia. Thus emerged a port visited by ships of many different nations.

As this harbour was not very secure, it was moved to the more protected waters of Quemchi. This became quite an important place, where many people established themselves, amongst them Vicente Lobos Toledo from Valparaíso.

Compañía Explotadora de Maderas Valparaíso was formed in Quemchi in 1885, and later became the "Sociedad Nacional de Bosques y Maderas", with affiliated companies in Quemchi, Calbuco and Maullín, and with an agent in Ancud.

In 1881 Luis Martiniano was appointed Governor of Chiloé. He signed the declaration recognising Quemchi and its environs as an administrative area of the republic.

=== 20th century ===
Compañía de Electricidad was formed in Quemchi in 1925 by Don Vicente Lobos T. and Don Antonio Scholbach and supplied the port with electric power.

The timber company Pi-Castolpi was founded in 1940 when the Spaniard don Antonio Campani, bought a thousand hectares of virgin forest in the Ancud area. With employment a strong community emerged.

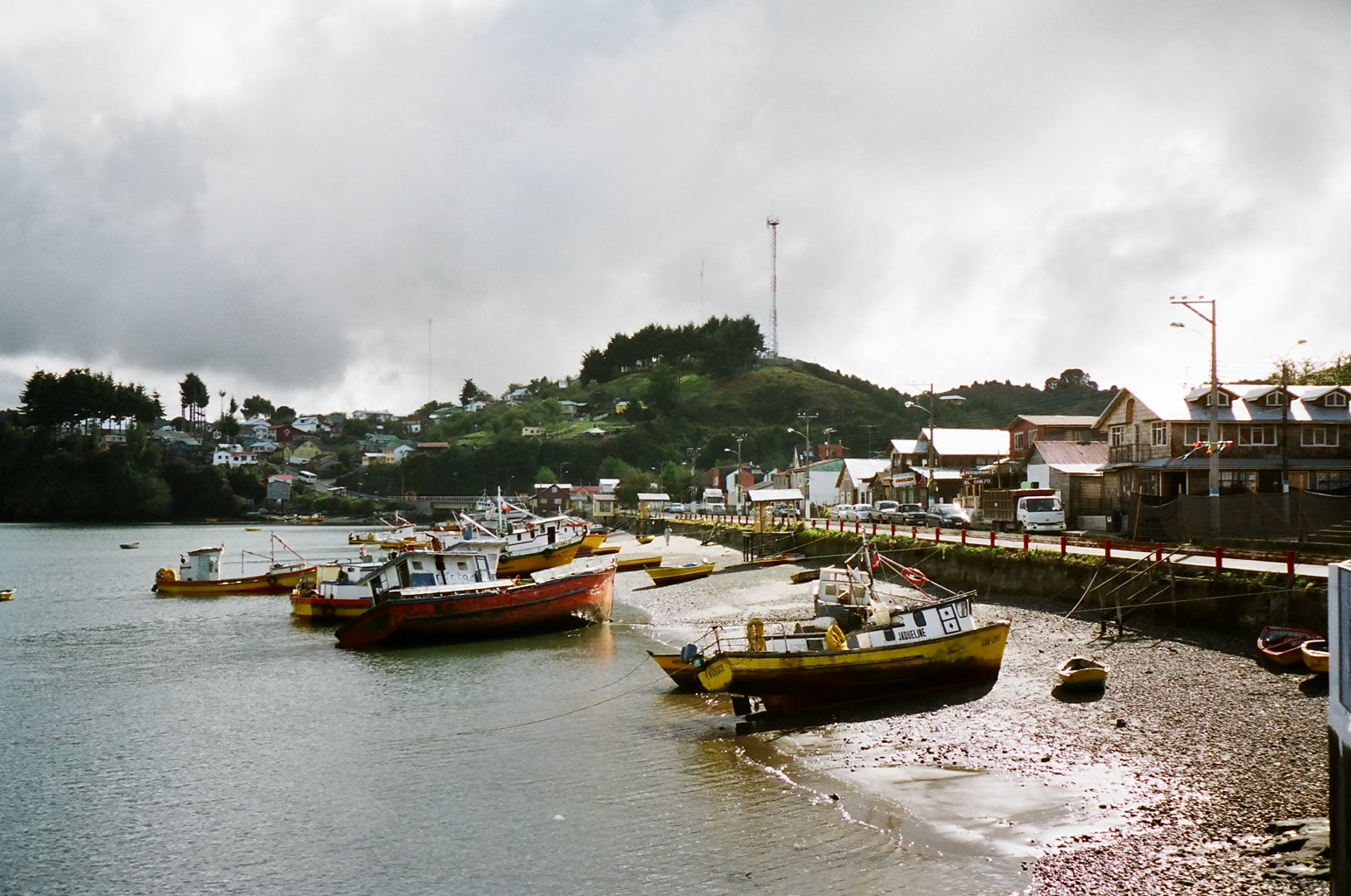
Port of Quemchi

== Demographics ==
Historical population
Year	Pop.	±% p.a.
1875	4,580	—
1885	5,352	+1.57%
1895	5,701	+0.63%
1907	6,218	+0.73%
1920	6,568	+0.42%
1930	6,621	+0.08%
1940	6,755	+0.20%
1952	6,356	−0.51%
1970	9,422	+2.21%
1982	9,422	+0.00%
1992	8,188	−1.39%
2002	8,689	+0.60%
2017	8,352	−0.26%
2024	8,409	+0.10%
Source: "Censo de Población y Vivienda". National Statistics Institute.

According to the 2002 census of the National Statistics Institute, Quemchi spans an area of 440.3 km^{2} (170 sq mi) and has 8,689 inhabitants (4,525 men and 4,164 women). Of these, 1,665 (19.2%) lived in urban areas and 7,024 (80.8%) in rural areas. The population grew by 6.1% (501 persons) between the 1992 and 2002 censuses.

== Administration ==
As a commune, Quemchi is a third-level administrative division of Chile administered by a municipal council, headed by an alcalde who is directly elected every four years. The 2008-2012 alcalde is Luis Macías Demarchi (ILC).

Within the electoral divisions of Chile, Quemchi is represented in the Chamber of Deputies by Gabriel Ascencio (PDC) and Alejandro Santana (RN) as part of the 58th electoral district, together with Castro, Ancud, Dalcahue, Curaco de Vélez, Quinchao, Puqueldón, Chonchi, Queilén, Quellón, Chaitén, Hualaihué, Futaleufú and Palena. The commune is represented in the Senate by Camilo Escalona Medina (PS) and Carlos Kuschel Silva (RN) as part of the 17th senatorial constituency (Los Lagos Region).

== Climate ==
Climate data for Morro Lobos
Month	Jan	Feb	Mar	Apr	May	Jun	Jul	Aug	Sep	Oct	Nov	Dec	Year
Mean daily maximum °C (°F)	18.1 (64.6)	17.5 (63.5)	15.7 (60.3)	12.9 (55.2)	10.8 (51.4)	9.4 (48.9)	9.3 (48.7)	9.4 (48.9)	10.6 (51.1)	13.0 (55.4)	14.5 (58.1)	16.8 (62.2)	13.2 (55.7)
Daily mean °C (°F)	13.3 (55.9)	12.9 (55.2)	11.8 (53.2)	9.8 (49.6)	8.0 (46.4)	6.8 (44.2)	6.8 (44.2)	6.6 (43.9)	7.3 (45.1)	9.1 (48.4)	10.1 (50.2)	12.0 (53.6)	9.5 (49.2)
Mean daily minimum °C (°F)	9.6 (49.3)	9.6 (49.3)	8.8 (47.8)	7.1 (44.8)	5.8 (42.4)	4.7 (40.5)	4.6 (40.3)	4.3 (39.7)	4.7 (40.5)	6.1 (43.0)	6.7 (44.1)	8.5 (47.3)	6.7 (44.1)
Average precipitation mm (inches)	100.3 (3.95)	117.3 (4.62)	205.5 (8.09)	246.6 (9.71)	294.9 (11.61)	327.7 (12.90)	302.7 (11.92)	275.6 (10.85)	164.4 (6.47)	96.0 (3.78)	160.5 (6.32)	154.2 (6.07)	2,445.7 (96.29)
Source: Bioclimatografia de Chile
