= Puqueldón =

- Commune
- Location of Puqueldón commune in Los Lagos Region Location in Chile
- Coordinates (commune): 42°35′S 73°38′W
- Country: Chile
- Region: Los Lagos
- Province: Chiloé

Government
  - Type: Municipality
  - Alcalde: Pedro Montecinos Montiel (Ind)

Area
  - Total: 97.3 km^{2} (37.6 sq mi)

Population (2012 Census)
  - Total: 4,023
  - Density: 41.3/km^{2} (107/sq mi)
  - Urban: 0
  - Rural: 4,160

Sex
  - Men: 2,006
  - Women: 2,154
- Area code: 56 + 65
- Website: Municipality of Puqueldón

Puqueldón is a Chilean commune in Chiloé Archipelago which is part of Chiloé Province and Los Lagos Region. The commune is located on Lemuy Island and consists of eight villages the biggest of which is Puqueldón. Puqueldón was one of the towns to receive the Bill & Melinda Gates Foundations scholarship in 2002.

== History ==
Puqueldón which gained town ("Villa") status at the end of the 18th century was mentioned as Pucolón in a document written in 1776. The place is known for the strong faith of its people. Contemporary Spanish documents speak of a chapel here in 1785 and of a rustic village in 1787. In the later year a census established the population as 1,521 Spaniards and 74 natives. In the colonial period Puqueldón was under military government and had 4 towns of which Ichuac had the greatest population. Finally, in 1826, it became a department of Chiloé. By 1924 the town had a chapel, town square, post office and telegraph services, a civil registry and public schools. The present church at Plaza de Armas was built in 1940.

== Architecture ==
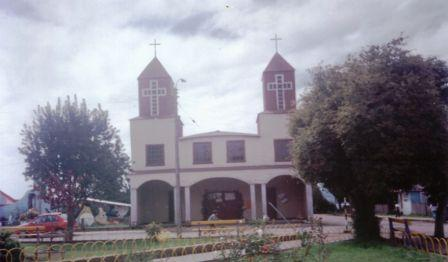
Church

As in the rest of the archipelago, the population of Puqueldón were inspired by a deep religious faith and built 8 churches, each special in its own way. Some, like Ichuac, Aldachildo and Detif are more than 100 years old and have recently been declared World Heritage Sites, along with 15 other Chilote churches. Some have picturesque cemeteries with little shingled mausoleums.

== Demographics ==
Historical population
Year	Pop.	±% p.a.
1875	4,541	—
1885	5,226	+1.41%
1895	5,330	+0.20%
1907	5,818	+0.73%
1920	7,072	+1.51%
1930	5,041	−3.33%
1940	4,902	−0.28%
1952	4,463	−0.78%
1970	4,079	−0.50%
1982	4,374	+0.58%
1992	4,248	−0.29%
2002	4,160	−0.21%
2017	3,921	−0.39%
2024	4,048	+0.46%
Source: "Censo de Población y Vivienda". National Statistics Institute.

According to the 2002 census of the National Statistics Institute, Puqueldón spans an area of 97.3 km^{2} (38 sq mi) and has 4,160 inhabitants (2,006 men and 2,154 women), making the commune an entirely rural area. The population fell by 2.1% (88 persons) between the 1992 and 2002 censuses.

== Administration ==
As a commune, Puqueldón is a third-level administrative division of Chile administered by a municipal council, headed by an alcalde who is directly elected every four years. The 2008-2012 alcalde is Elson Carcamo Barría (Ind.).

Within the electoral divisions of Chile, Puqueldón is represented in the Chamber of Deputies by Gabriel Ascencio (PDC) and Alejandro Santana (RN) as part of the 58th electoral district, together with Castro, Ancud, Quemchi, Dalcahue, Curaco de Vélez, Quinchao, Chonchi, Queilén, Quellón, Chaitén, Hualaihué, Futaleufú and Palena. The commune is represented in the Senate by Camilo Escalona Medina (PS) and Carlos Kuschel Silva (RN) as part of the 17th senatorial constituency (Los Lagos Region).

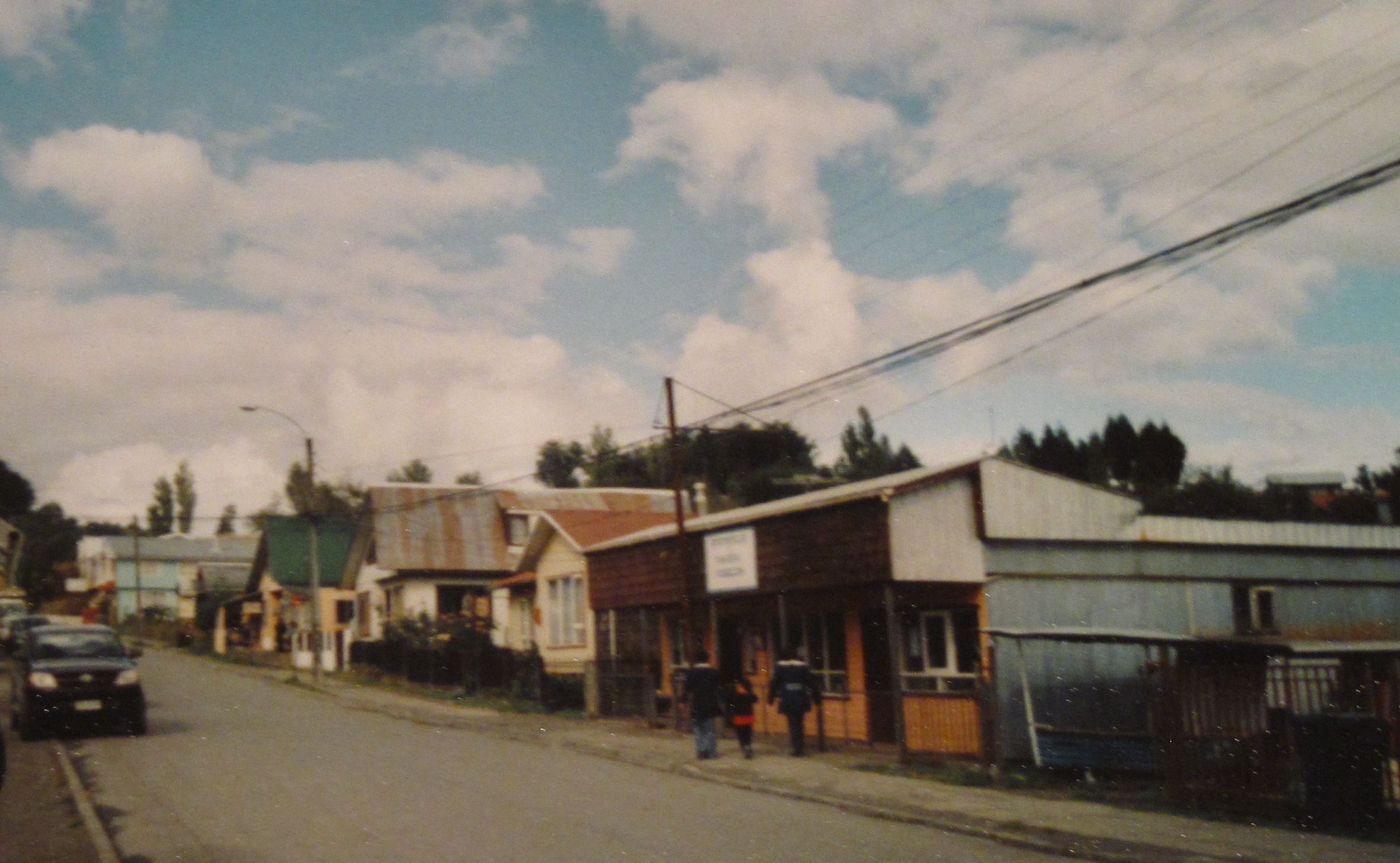
Calle J.M. Carrera is the main street of the village of Puqueldón

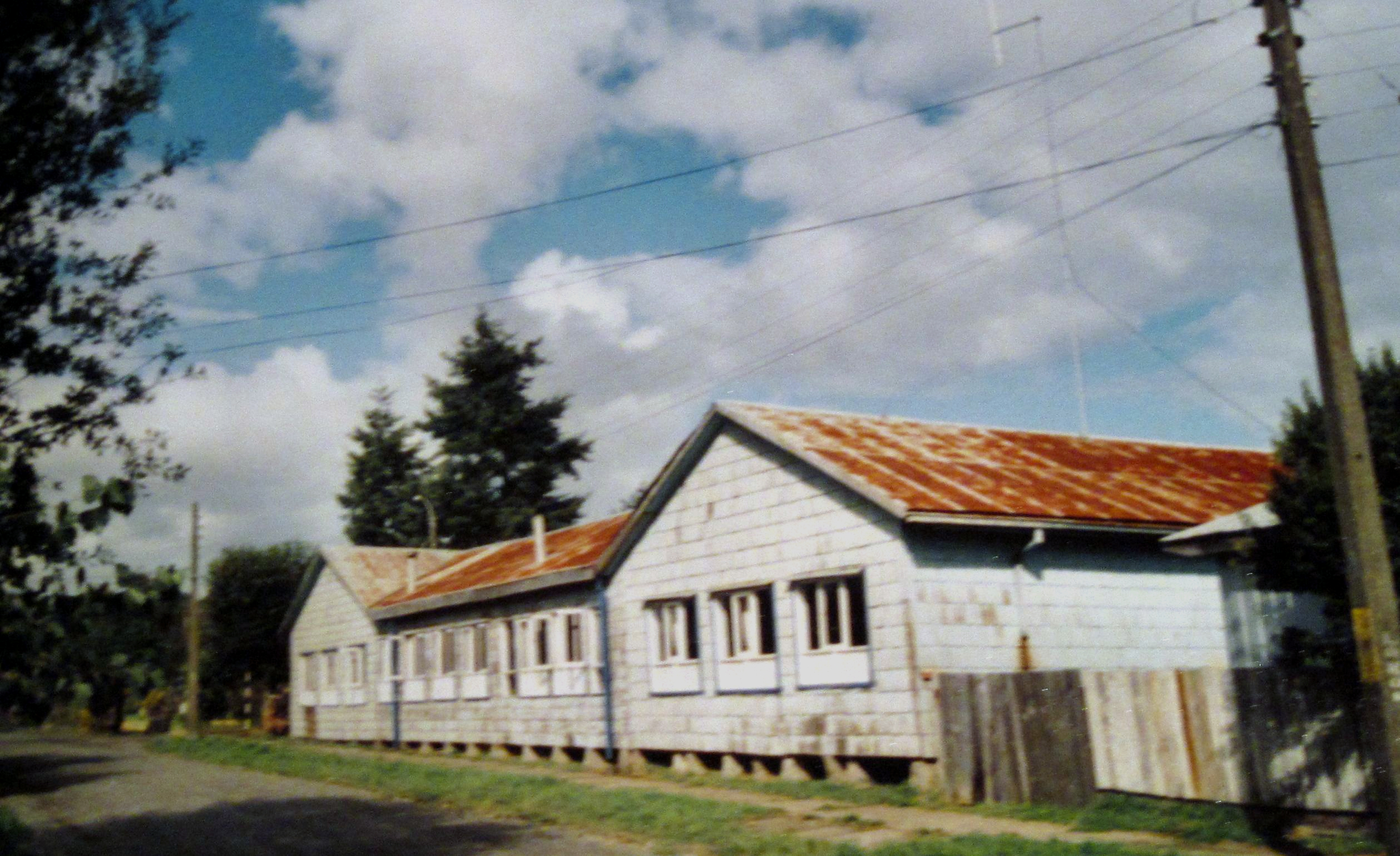
School in the village of Puqueldón

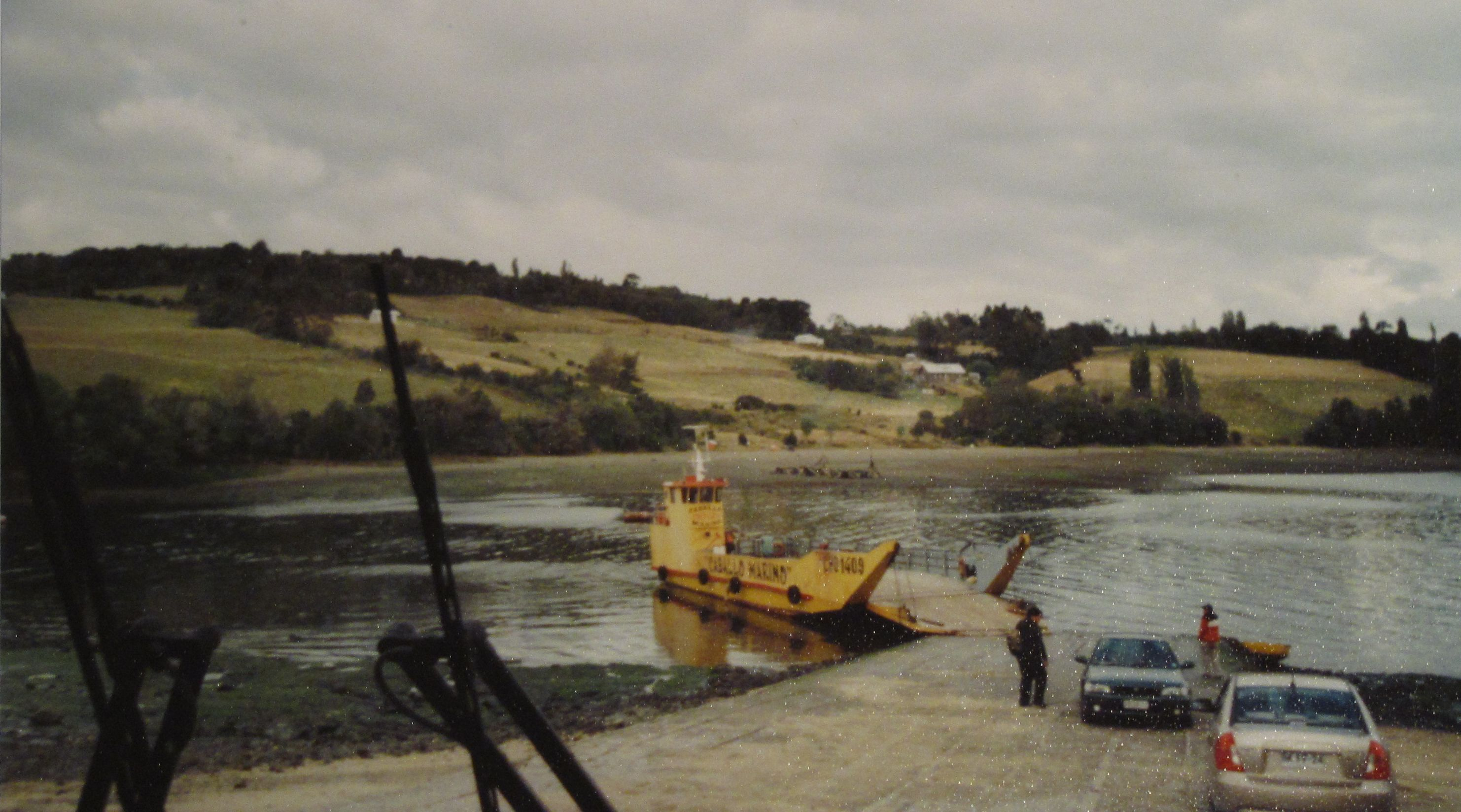
Ferry from Lemuy Island to Chiloé Island

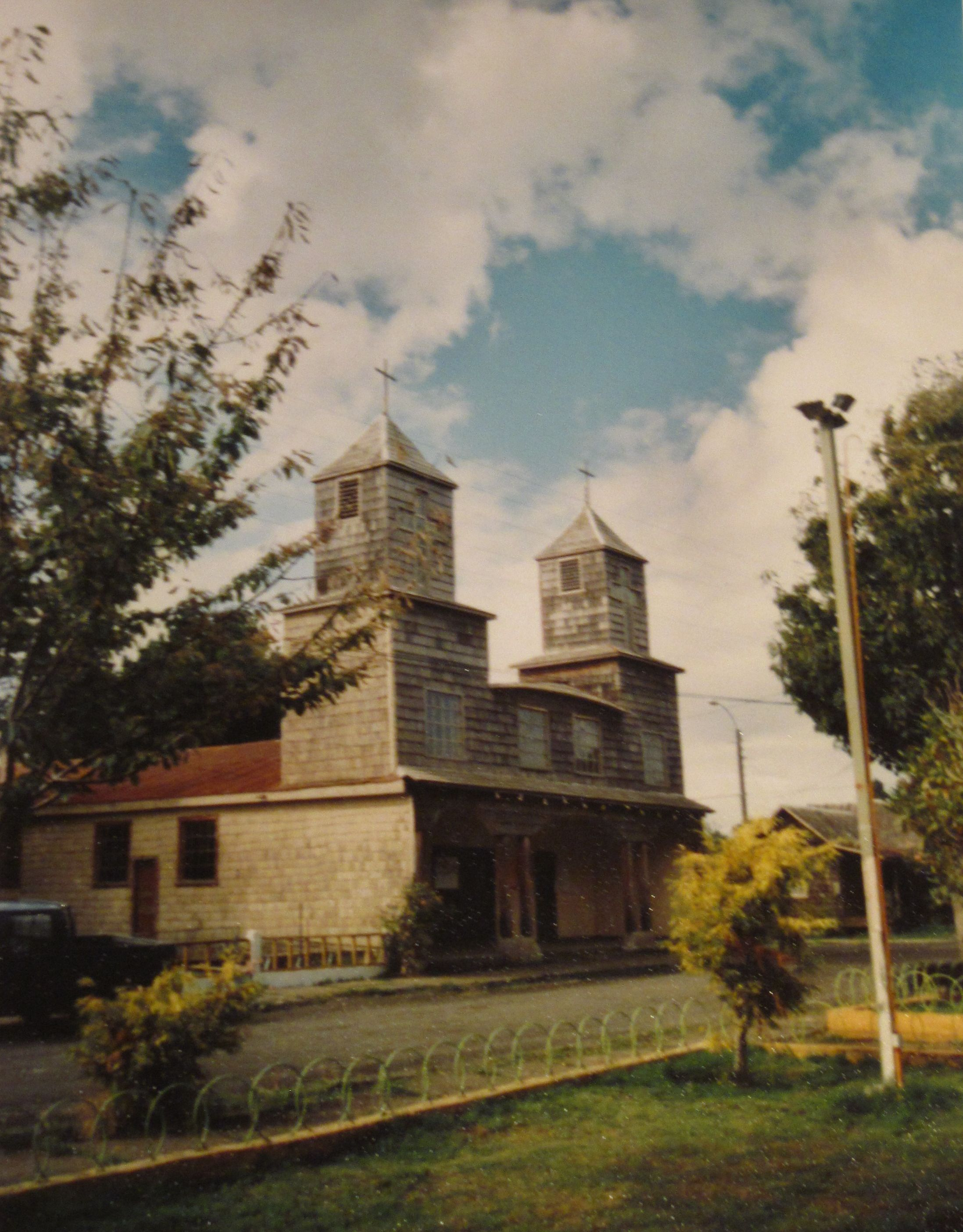
Plaza de Armas in the village of Puqueldón in 2008
