= Quellón =

- City and Commune
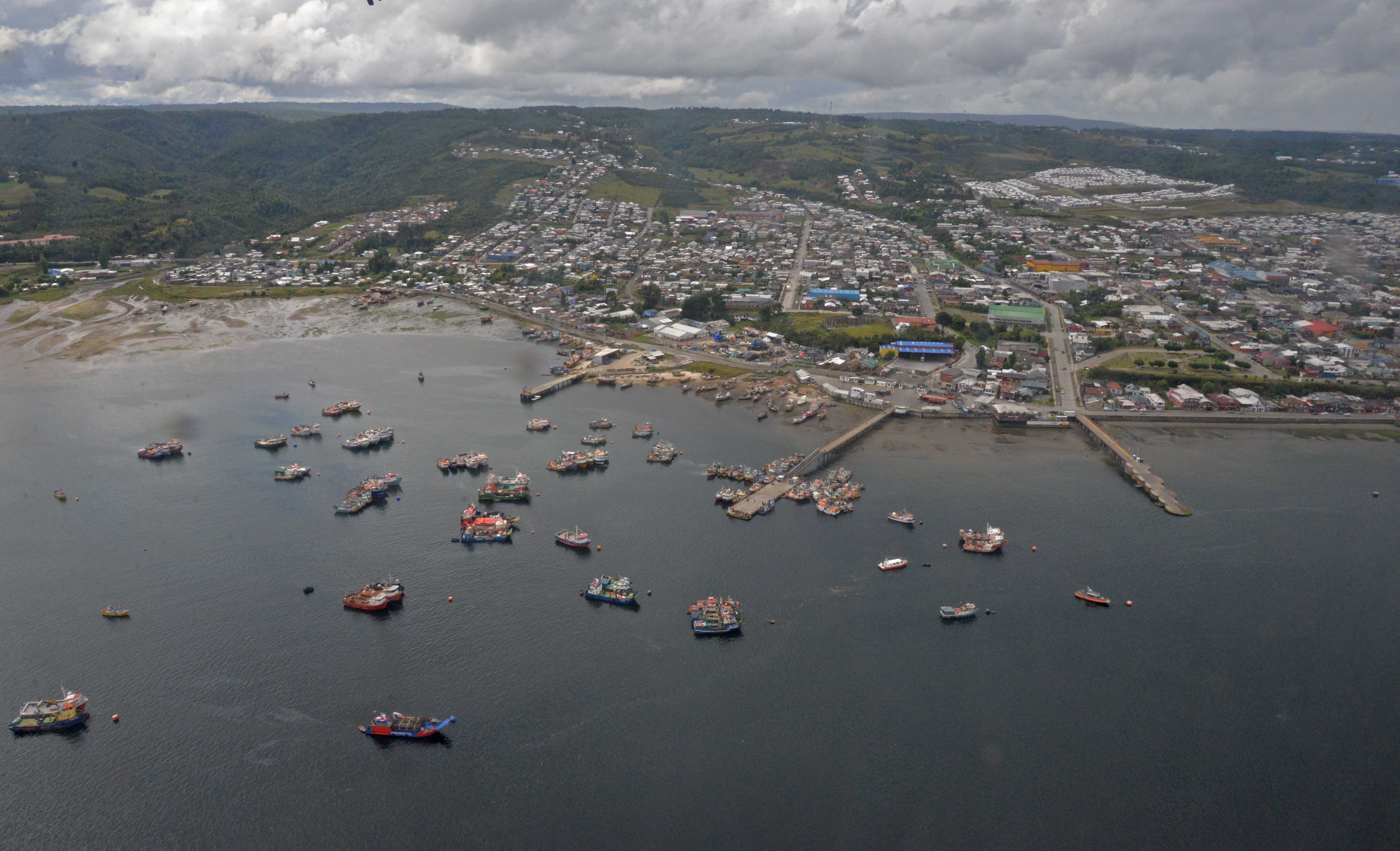
- Aerial view of Quellón by 2016

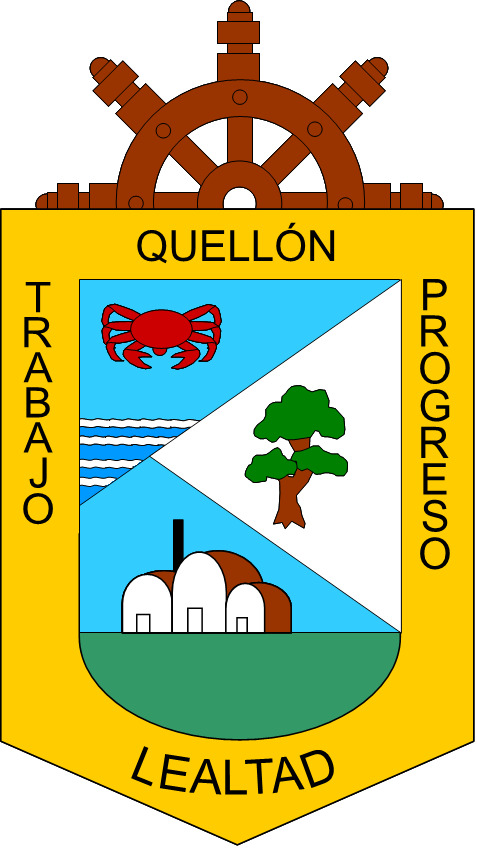
- Coat of arms Location of the Quellón commune in Los Lagos Region Location in Chile
- Coordinates (city): 43°5′57″S 73°35′46″W
- Country: Chile
- Region: Los Lagos
- Province: Chiloé
- Founded: 1905
- Founded as: Llauquil

Government
  - Type: Municipality
  - Alcalde: Cristián Ojeda Chiguay (DC)

Area
  - Total: 3,244.0 km^{2} (1,252.5 sq mi)
- Elevation: 5 m (16 ft)

Population (2002 Census)
  - Total: 23,992
  - Density: 7.3958/km^{2} (19.155/sq mi)
  - Urban: 13,656
  - Rural: 8,167
- Demonym: Quellonino

Sex
  - Men: 11,595
  - Women: 10,228
- Time zone: UTC−4 (CLT)
  - Summer (DST): UTC−3 (CLST)
- Area code: 56 + 65
- Website: web.archive.org/web/20090627185131/http://www.municipalidadquellon.cl:80/ (in Spanish)

Quellón is a Chilean port city and commune in Chiloé Province, in southern Chiloé Island, Los Lagos Region. It is one of the southern end-stations of the Panamerican Highway and the Pacific Coast Highway. The city is a hub for aquaculture and fisheries in southern Chiloé and the Guaitecas and Chonos archipelagoes to the south. Various ferry lanes connects Quellón with the Patagonian settlements such as Melinka, Puerto Cisnes and Puerto Chacabuco.

In Quellón the majority of men work on small boats called "lanchas" for days at a time fishing. Also many men and women work in local seafood processing plants.

== Climate ==
Quellón has an oceanic climate (Köppen climate classification Cfb) with some drying trend in summer. Winters are cool and wet but mild with a July average of 7.7 °C (45.9 °F). During this time of the year, precipitation is very high, averaging around 208 to 261 millimetres (8 to 10 in) from June to August and humidity is high, averaging around 85–87%. Few days are dry in winter, since there are 22–24 days with measurable precipitation from June to August. Nonetheless, snowfall is rare and most years will record no snowfall. Summers are mild with a January average of 15.1 °C (59.2 °F) and during this time, precipitation is lower, averaging 103.3 millimetres (4 in) in February, the driest month. Temperatures can occasionally exceed 20 °C (68 °F) anytime from September to June. One characteristic of the climate is that Quellón, like the rest of the central and southern parts of Chiloé island is exposed to strong westerly winds throughout the year. The average annual precipitation is 1,960.6 millimetres (77 in), with significant amounts in all months; the 4 months with the most precipitation make up 50% of the total annual precipitation. On average, there are 239 days with measureable precipitation. The record high was 32.5 °C (90.5 °F) in January 1978 and the record low was −4.4 °C (24.1 °F) in June 1971 and August 1975.

Climate data for Quellón
Month	Jan	Feb	Mar	Apr	May	Jun	Jul	Aug	Sep	Oct	Nov	Dec	Year
Record high °C (°F)	32.5 (90.5)	26.4 (79.5)	24.6 (76.3)	27.6 (81.7)	19.8 (67.6)	19.0 (66.2)	22.5 (72.5)	19.7 (67.5)	23.2 (73.8)	22.5 (72.5)	25.6 (78.1)	25.8 (78.4)	32.5 (90.5)
Mean daily maximum °C (°F)	17.8 (64.0)	17.6 (63.7)	16.2 (61.2)	14.0 (57.2)	12.0 (53.6)	10.1 (50.2)	9.7 (49.5)	10.4 (50.7)	11.8 (53.2)	13.5 (56.3)	15.2 (59.4)	16.8 (62.2)	13.7 (56.7)
Daily mean °C (°F)	15.1 (59.2)	14.9 (58.8)	13.6 (56.5)	11.6 (52.9)	9.9 (49.8)	8.1 (46.6)	7.7 (45.9)	8.3 (46.9)	9.4 (48.9)	11.0 (51.8)	12.6 (54.7)	14.2 (57.6)	11.3 (52.3)
Mean daily minimum °C (°F)	11.5 (52.7)	11.1 (52.0)	10.0 (50.0)	8.5 (47.3)	7.5 (45.5)	5.9 (42.6)	5.4 (41.7)	5.5 (41.9)	6.2 (43.2)	7.3 (45.1)	8.9 (48.0)	10.6 (51.1)	8.2 (46.8)
Record low °C (°F)	0.6 (33.1)	0.9 (33.6)	0.7 (33.3)	0.3 (32.5)	0.0 (32.0)	−4.4 (24.1)	−1.9 (28.6)	−4.4 (24.1)	−1.0 (30.2)	0.0 (32.0)	0.1 (32.2)	0.7 (33.3)	−4.4 (24.1)
Average precipitation mm (inches)	110.9 (4.37)	103.3 (4.07)	106.7 (4.20)	158.6 (6.24)	245.0 (9.65)	264.1 (10.40)	237.6 (9.35)	208.1 (8.19)	174.6 (6.87)	129.1 (5.08)	116.2 (4.57)	106.4 (4.19)	1,960.6 (77.18)
Average precipitation days	17	14	17	20	24	23	22	24	21	20	19	18	239
Average relative humidity (%)	77	78	81	84	88	88	87	85	82	80	77	77	82
Source: Dirección Meteorológica de Chile

== Demographics ==
Historical population
Year	Pop.	±% p.a.
1875	863	—
1885	1,647	+6.68%
1895	2,273	+3.27%
1907	4,467	+5.79%
1920	7,730	+4.31%
1930	6,387	−1.89%
1940	7,628	+1.79%
1952	7,426	−0.22%
1970	7,887	+0.34%
1982	10,206	+2.17%
1992	15,055	+3.96%
2002	21,823	+3.78%
2017	27,192	+1.48%
2024	28,460	+0.65%
Source: "Censo de Población y Vivienda". National Statistics Institute.

According to the 2002 census of the National Statistics Institute, Quellón spans an area of 3,244 km^{2} (1,253 sq mi) and has 21,823 inhabitants (11,595 men and 10,228 women). Of these, 13,656 (62.6%) lived in urban areas and 8,167 (37.4%) in rural areas. The population grew by 45% (6,768 persons) between the 1992 and 2002 censuses.

== Administration ==
As a commune, Quellón is a third-level administrative division of Chile administered by a municipal council, headed by an alcalde who is directly elected every four years. The 2008-2012 alcalde is Iván Haro Uribe (RN).

Within the electoral divisions of Chile, Quellón is represented in the Chamber of Deputies by Gabriel Ascencio (PDC) and Alejandro Santana (RN) as part of the 58th electoral district, together with Castro, Ancud, Quemchi, Dalcahue, Curaco de Vélez, Quinchao, Puqueldón, Chonchi, Queilén, Chaitén, Hualaihué, Futaleufú and Palena. The commune is represented in the Senate by Camilo Escalona Medina (PS) and Carlos Kuschel Silva (RN) as part of the 17th senatorial constituency (Los Lagos Region).

== Transport ==
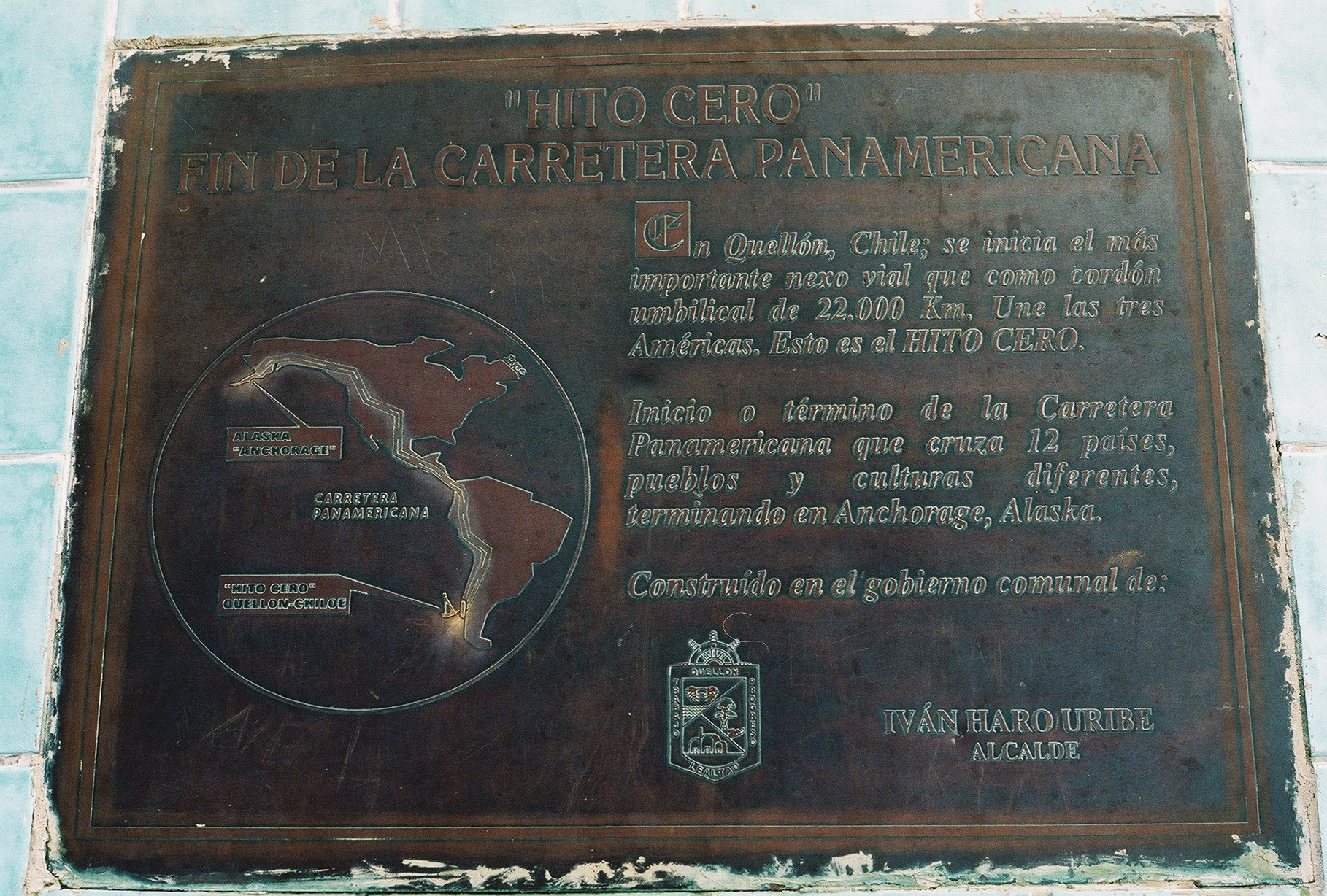
The end-station of the Panamerican Highway

A placard in Quellón marks a southern terminus of the Pan-American Highway, a network of roads spanning 47,958 km (29,800 mi) and 19 countries in the Americas. Its northern limit is in Anchorage, Alaska. Tierra del Fuego National Park in Argentina is also considered as an endpoint for the Panamerican Highway. The point also marks the southern endpoint of the Pacific Coastal Highway, which stretches 15,202 km (9,446 mi) from Lund, British Columbia. The southernmost reaches of continental Chile are not accessible by road except through neighboring Argentina due to the craggy Andes, fjords and the Southern Patagonian Ice Field.

Mocopulli Airport is in Chiloe Island; it offers flights to Santiago via LAN Express airlines.

== Sights ==
There are two museums in Quellón: The museum Museo Inchin Cuivi Anti (the name means "Our ancestors") explains the culture and the history of the Huilliche, and the Municipal Museum (Museo Municipal) refers to the history of the town. The Cultural Center of Quellón was built with the financial help of the salmon processing industry.

Close to Quellón there are several villages such as Punta de Lapa (5 km) with a beautiful 5 km long beach, or Compu (about 25 km to the north) with a wooden church which was built at the beginning of the 20th century. Quellón Viejo (4 km to the southwest), a village with a cemetery and a typical wooden church dating from the beginning of the 20th century is older than Quellón. Yaldad (11 km to the west) is a Huilliche village with about 500 inhabitants (2002) and a wooden church (Iglesia Jesús de Nazareno) representing the typical style of Chiloé which was built at the beginning of the 20th century and renovated in 1990. Trincao (10 km to the southwest) has a cemetery and a church dating from 1920.

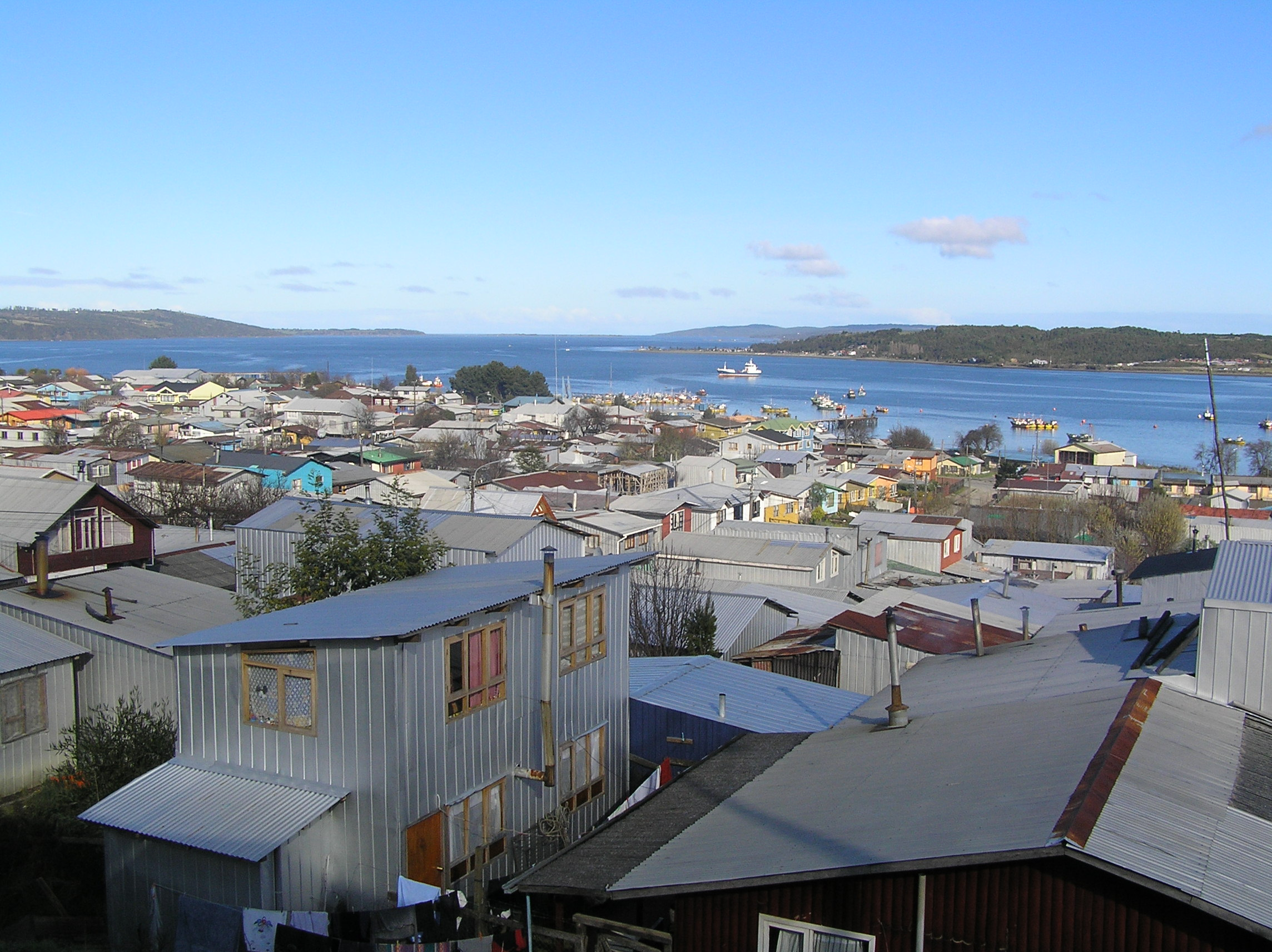
General view

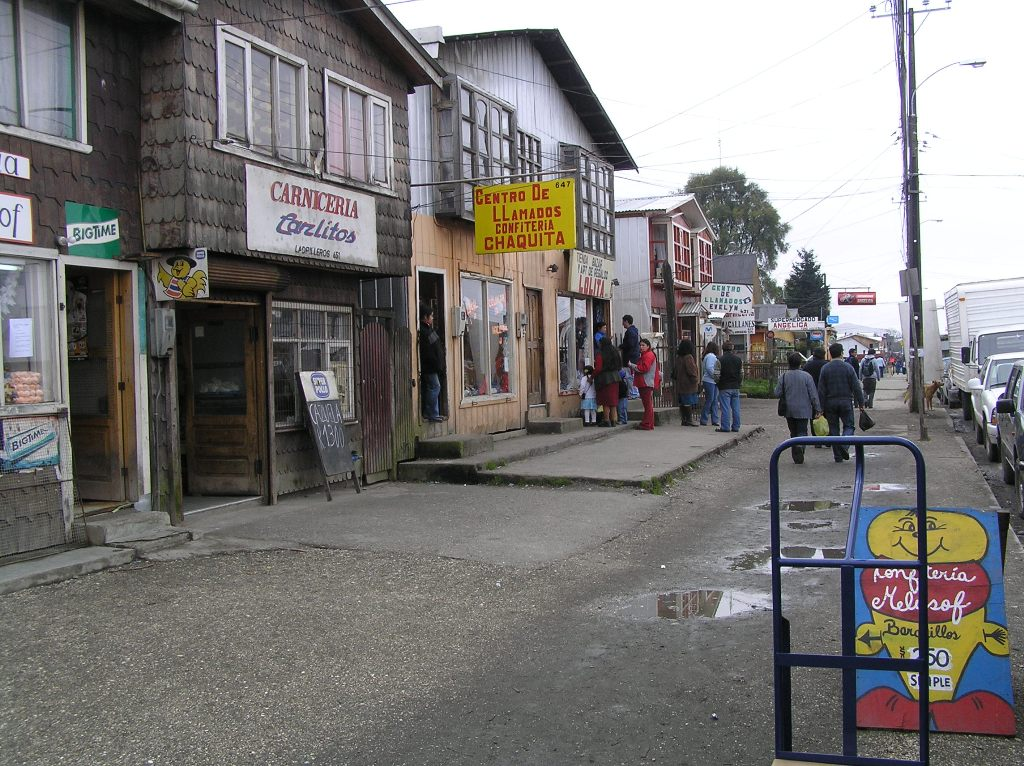
High street Calle Ladrilleros

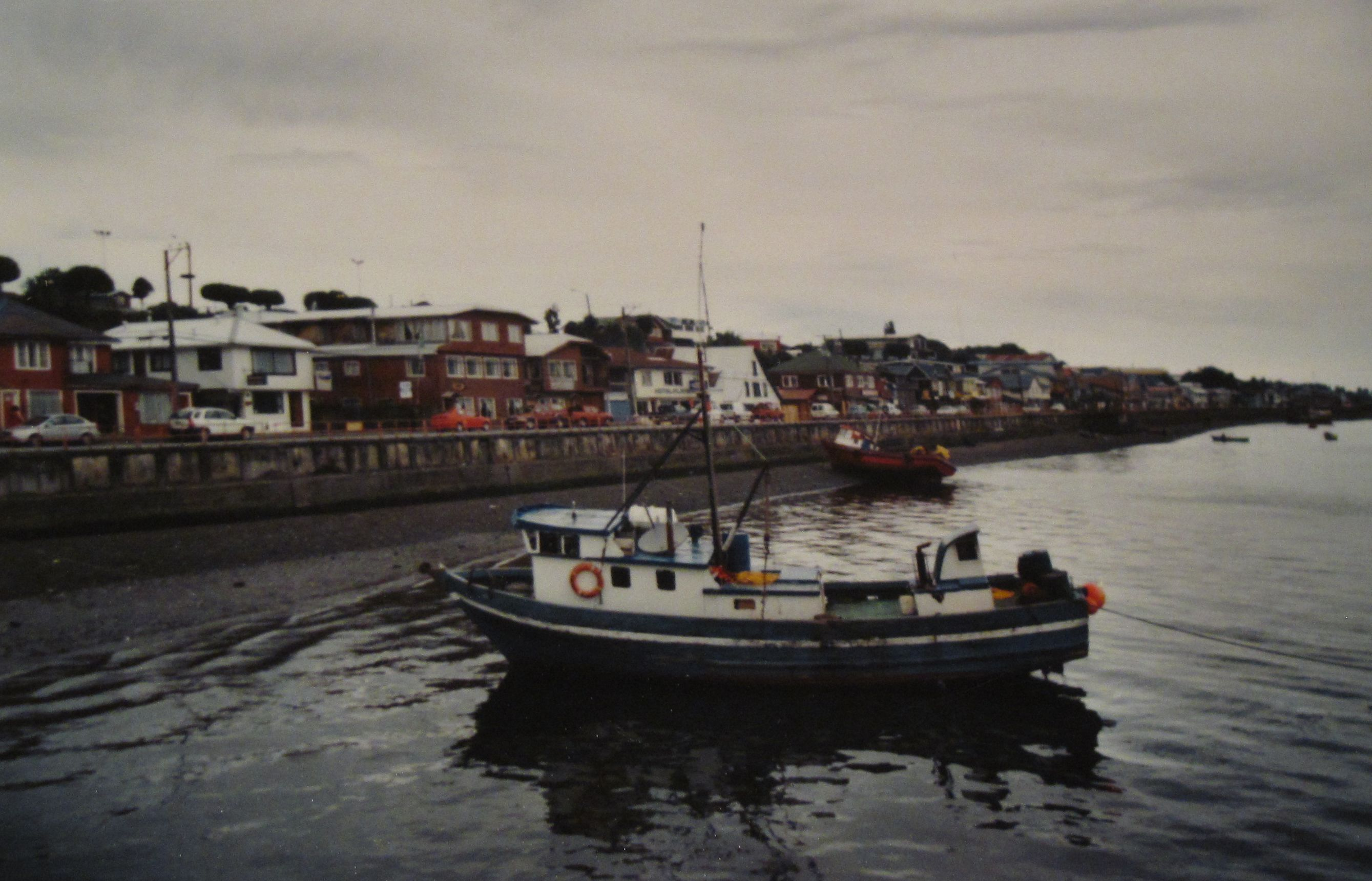
Marine drive Costanera Pedro Montt

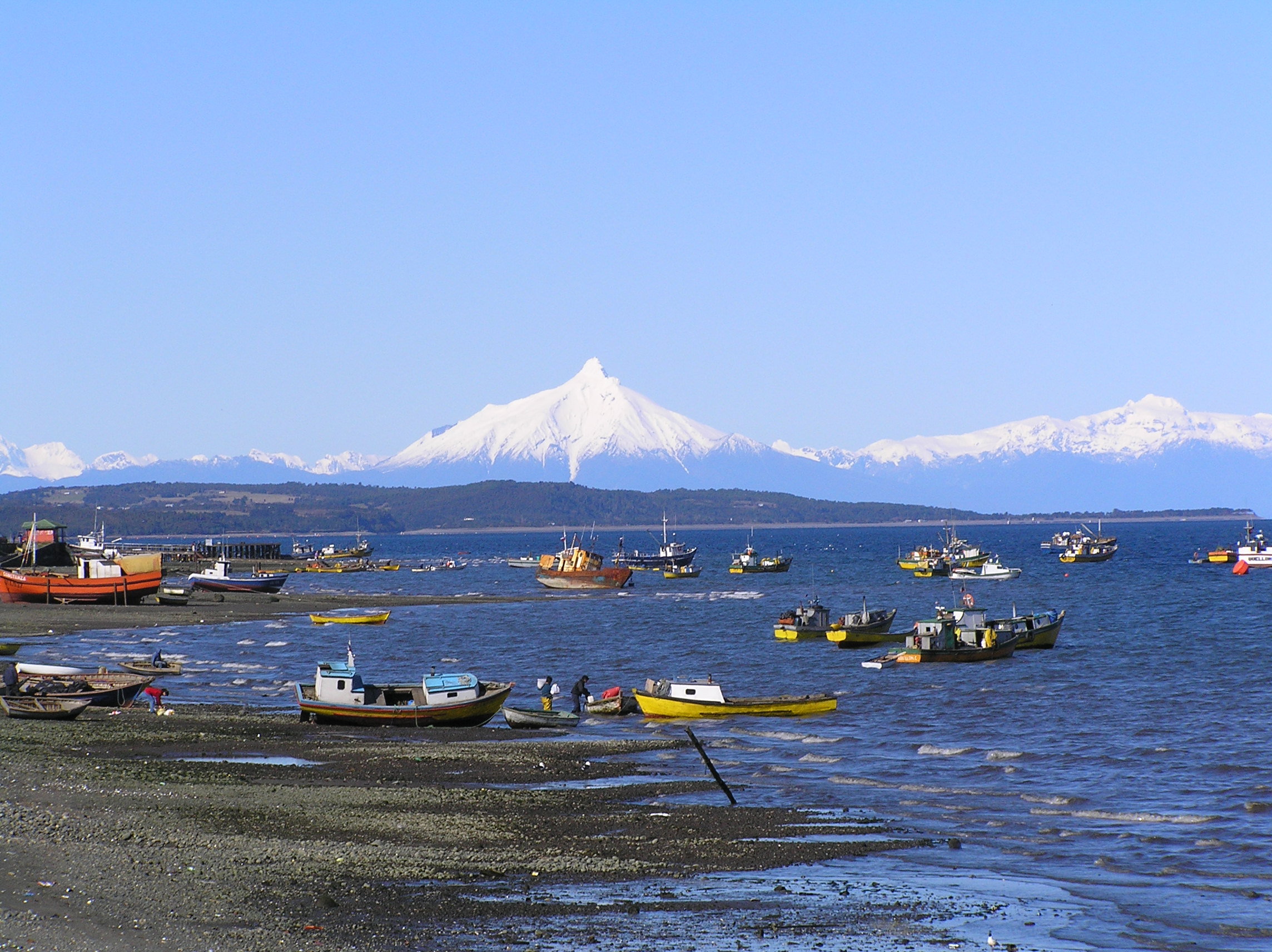
Coastline with volcano Corcovado

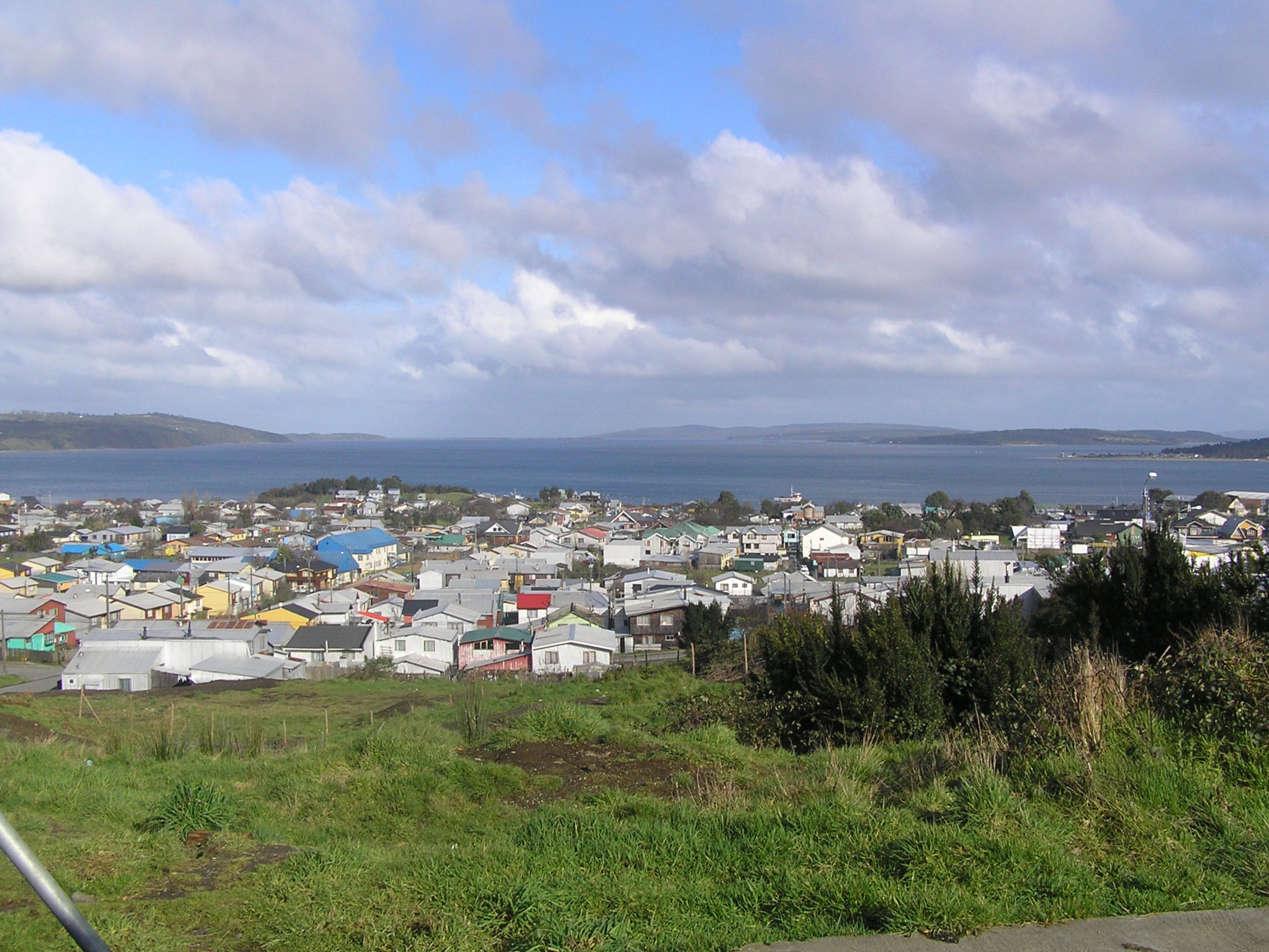
General view
