= Church of Rilán =

UNESCO World Heritage Site
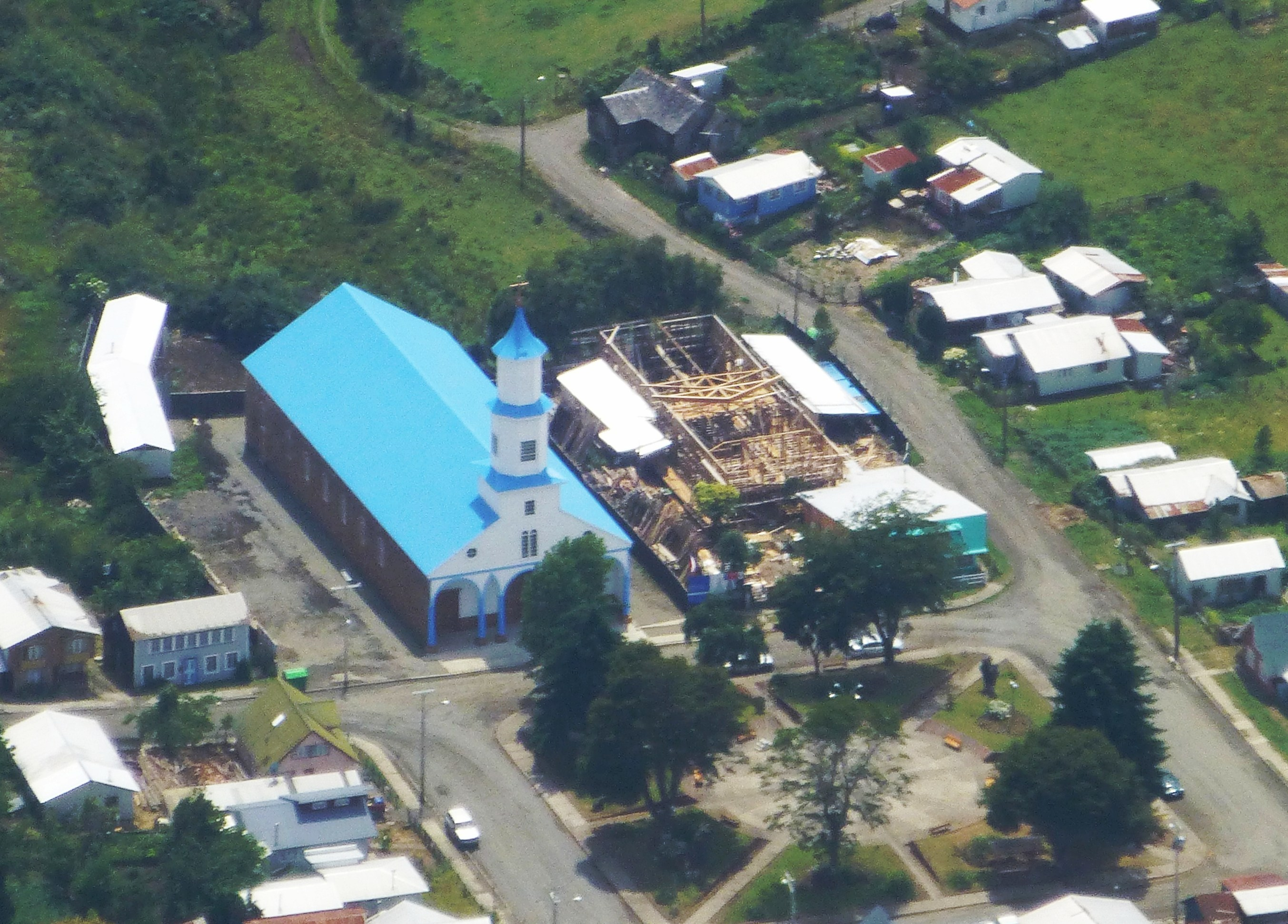

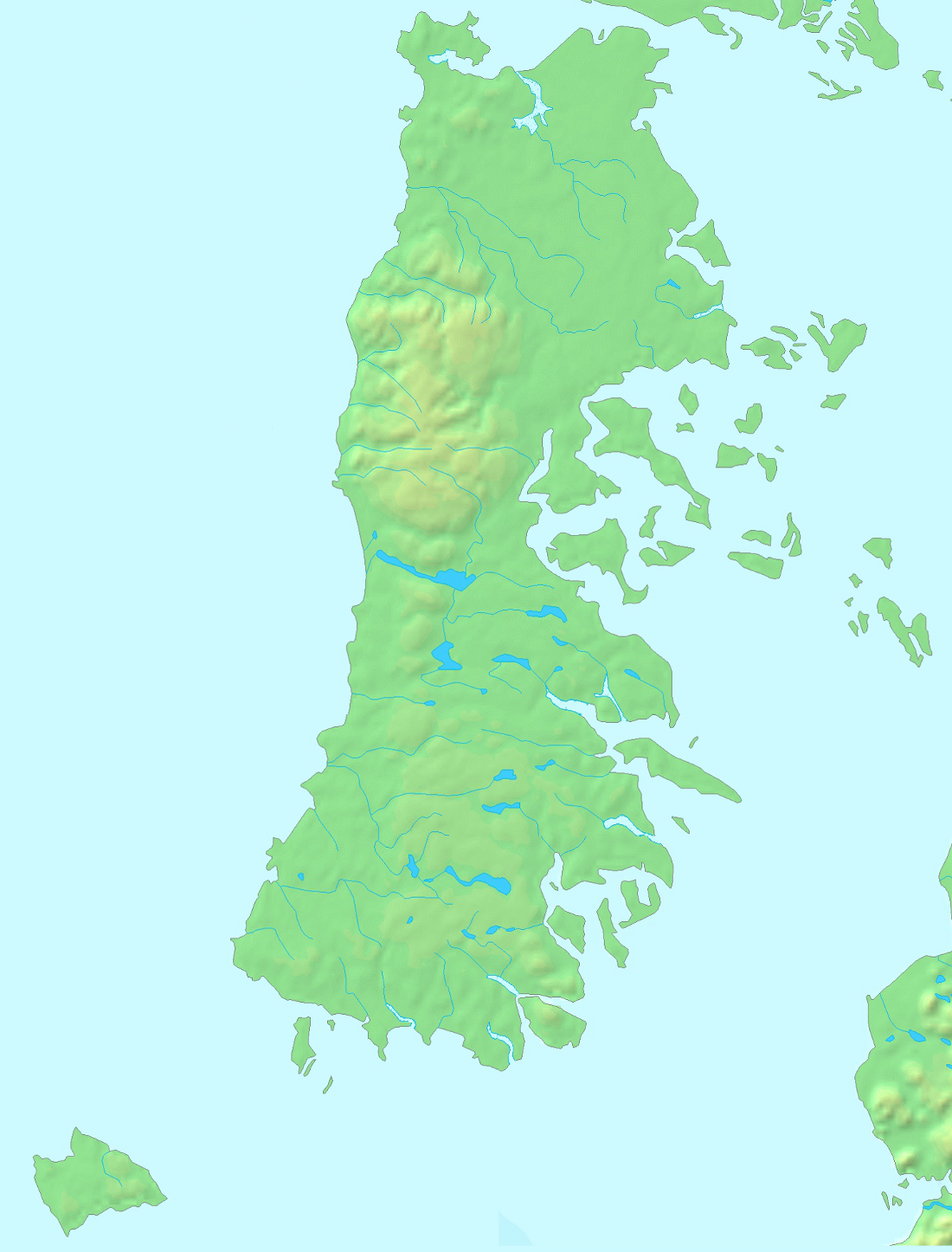
- Location within Chiloé Location within Los Lagos Location within Chile
- Location: Rilán, Castro, Chiloé Island, Chiloé Province, Los Lagos Region, Chile
- Part of: Churches of Chiloé
- Criteria: Cultural: (ii), (iii)
- Reference: 971-004
- Inscription: 2000 (24th Session)
- Area: 0.7 ha (1.7 acres)
- Coordinates: 42°31′11″S 73°37′43″W

The Church of St Mary, Rilán or simply Church of Rilán— Spanish: Iglesia de Santa María, Rilán— is a Catholic church located in the town of Rilán, commune of Castro, on the Chiloé Archipelago, southern Chile.

The Church of Rilán was declared a National Monument of Chile in 1971 and is one of the 16 Churches of Chiloé that were declared UNESCO World Heritage Sites on 30 November 2000.

The patron saint of the Church of St Mary, Rilán is Our Lady of Lourdes, whose feast day is celebrated on February 11.

This church leads one of the 24 parishes that form the Diocese of Ancud.

== History ==
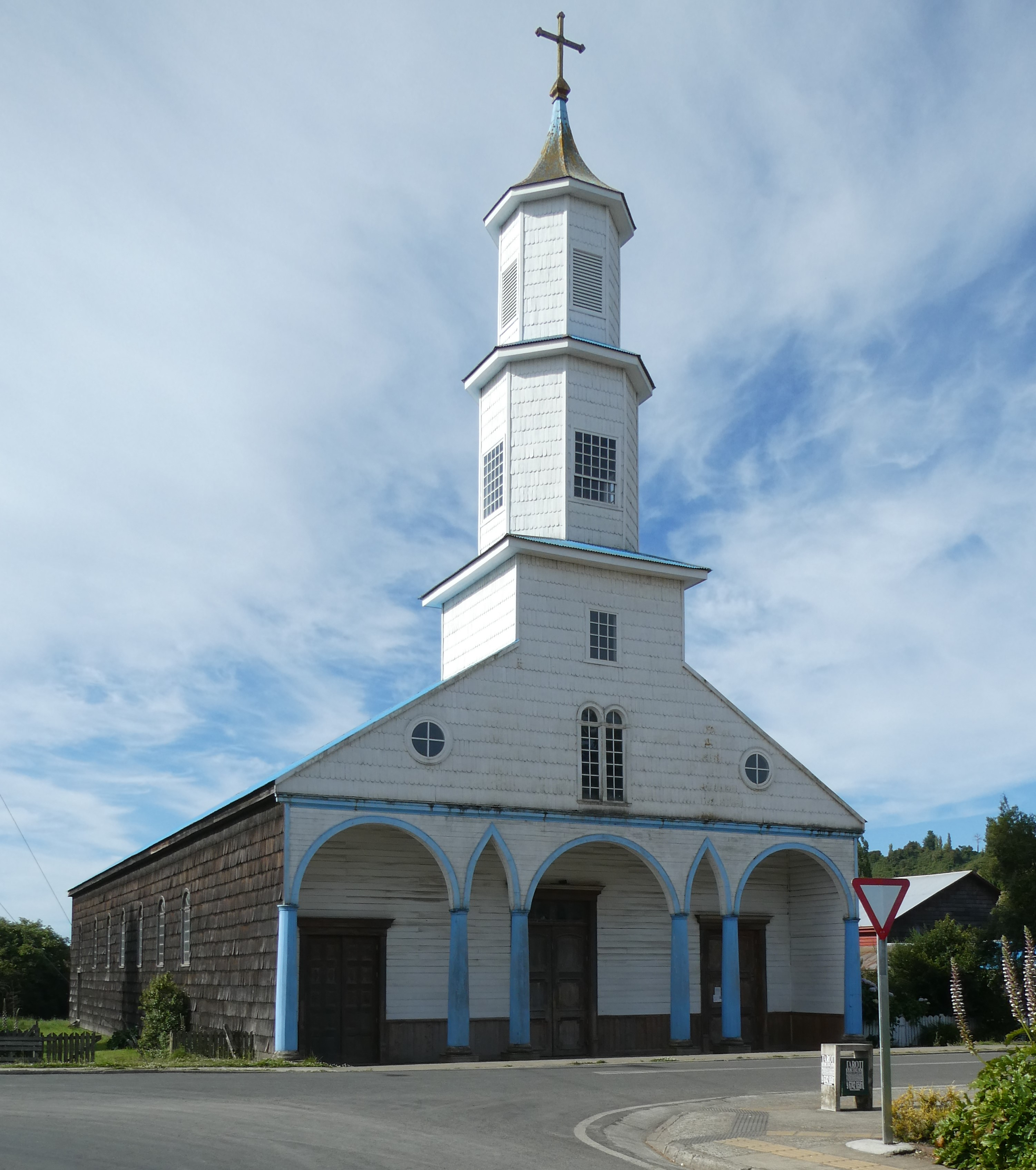
Church facade.

The history of the church dates back to 1658, when Rilán was a settlement for indigenous communities.

The current church was built early in the 19th century from coigue and cypress wood and is lined with alerce, cypress and mañio. It was declared a National Monument of Chile in 1979 and UNESCO World Heritage Site on 30 November 2000.

== See also ==
- Churches of Chiloé
