= Church of Ichuac =

UNESCO World Heritage Site
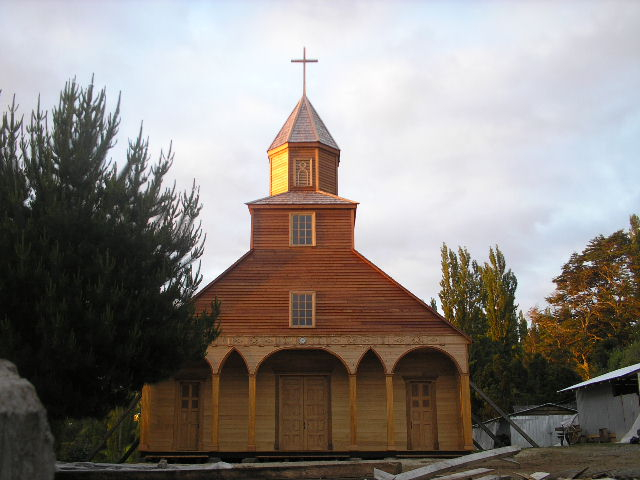
- Front of the church

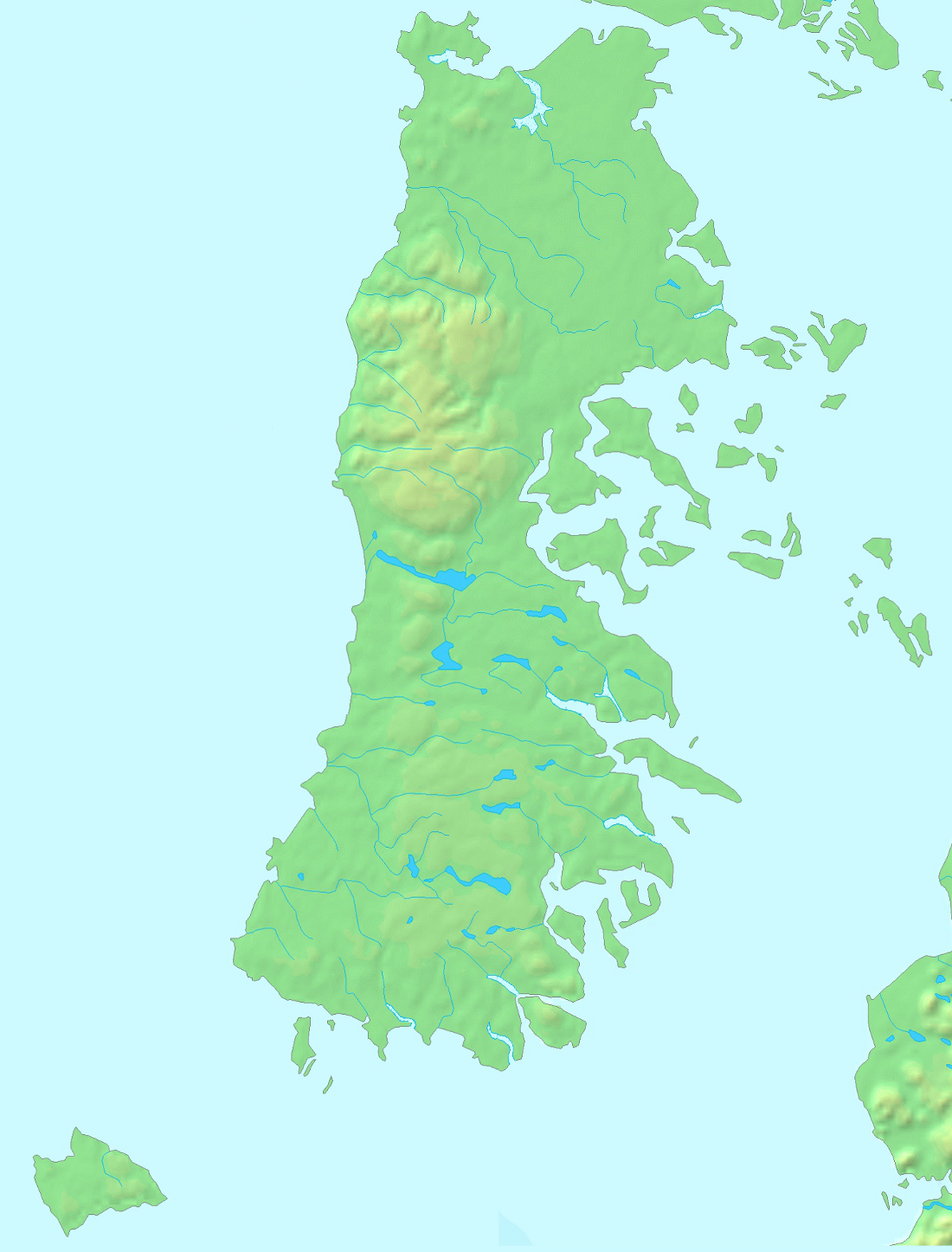
- Location within Chiloé Location within Los Lagos Location within Chile
- Location: Ichuac, Puqueldón, Lemuy Island, Chiloé Province, Los Lagos Region, Chile
- Part of: Churches of Chiloé
- Criteria: Cultural: (ii), (iii)
- Reference: 971-007
- Inscription: 2000 (24th Session)
- Area: 6.8 ha (17 acres)
- Coordinates: 42°36′57″S 73°43′11″W

The Church of Ichuac – Spanish: Iglesia de Ichuac – is a Catholic church in the town of Ichuac, commune of Puqueldón, on Lemuy Island, Chiloé Archipelago, southern Chile.

The Church of Ichuac was declared a National Monument of Chile in 1999 and is one of the 16 Churches of Chiloé that were declared UNESCO World Heritage Sites on 30 November 2000.

In the early 1990s, the local community in Ichuac joined to coordinate reparations on the church and it is currently considered to be in good condition. The patron saint of the church is the Virgin of Candelaria, whose feast day is celebrated on February 2.

This church belongs to the parish of San Pedro Nolasco, Puqueldón, one of the 24 parishes that form the Diocese of Ancud.

== See also ==
- Churches of Chiloé
