= Church of Chonchi =

UNESCO World Heritage Site
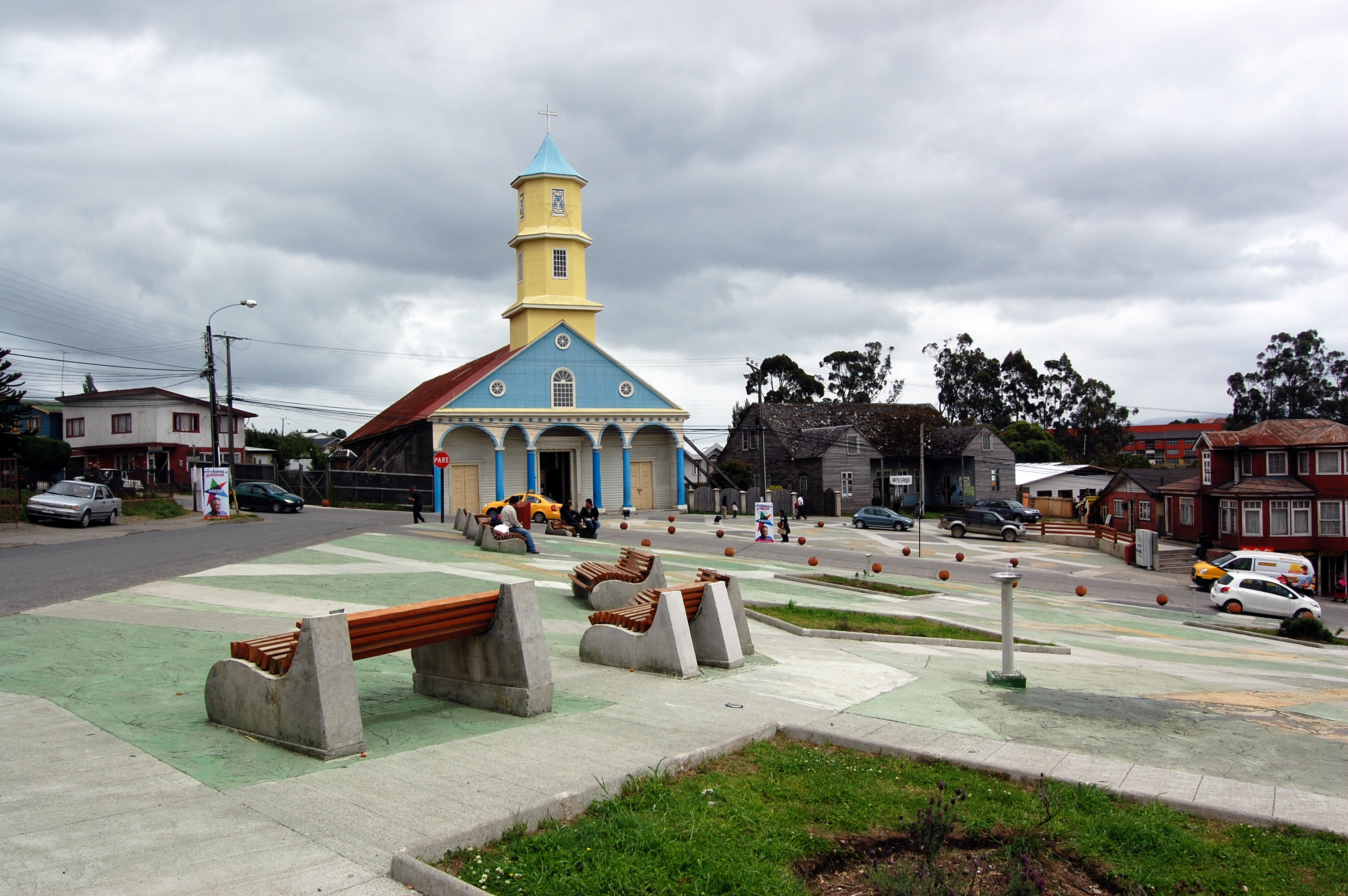

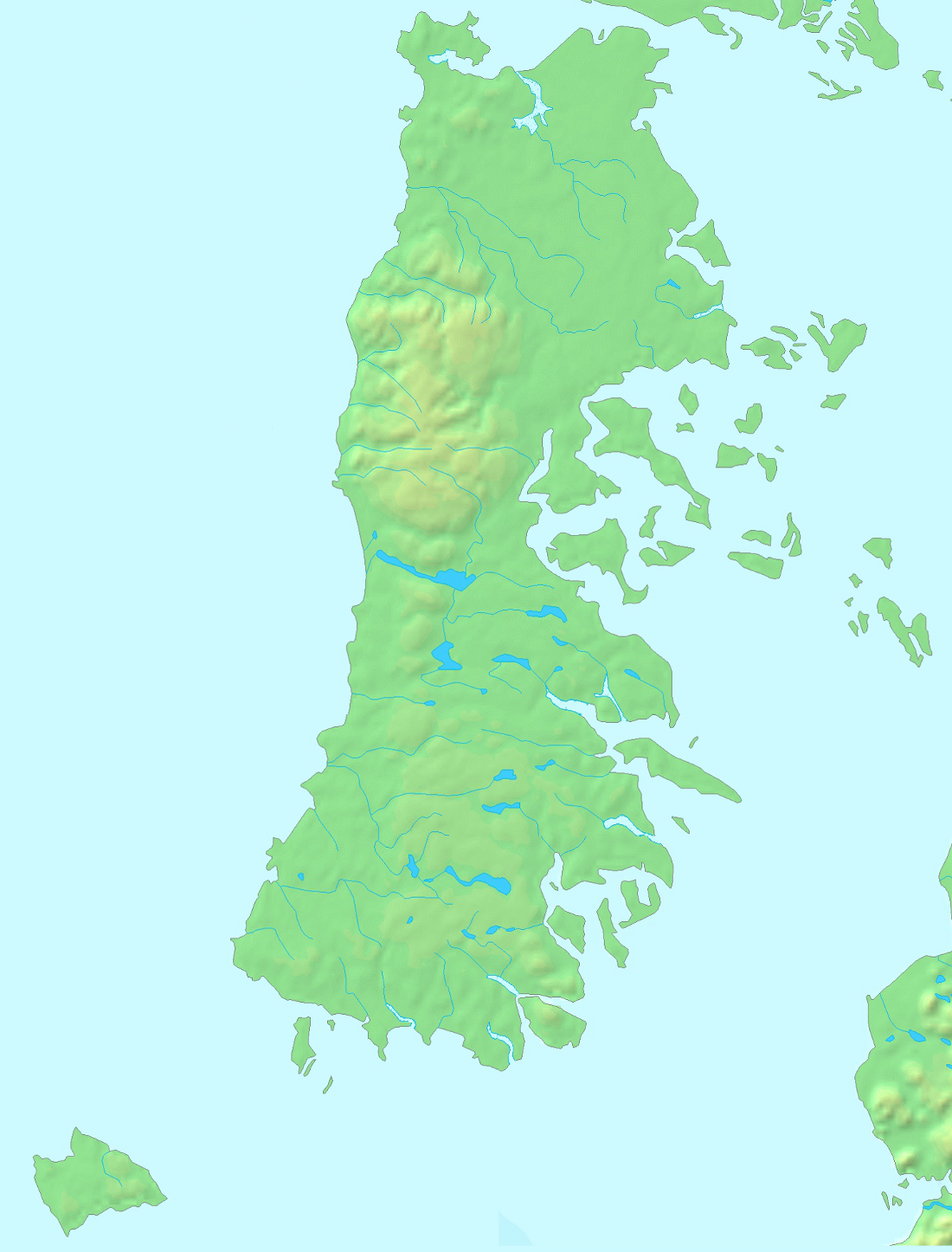
- Location within Chiloé Location within Los Lagos Location within Chile
- Location: Chonchi, Chiloé Island, Chiloé Province, Los Lagos Region, Chile
- Part of: Churches of Chiloé
- Criteria: Cultural: (ii), (iii)
- Reference: 971-010
- Inscription: 2000 (24th Session)
- Area: 0.4 ha (0.99 acres)
- Coordinates: 42°37′24″S 73°46′23″W

The Church of Chonchi or Church of St Charles Borromeo (Spanish: Iglesia de Chonchi, Iglesia de San Carlos Borromeo) is a Catholic church located in Chonchi, on the Chiloé Archipelago, Los Lagos Region, southern Chile.

The Church of Chonchi was declared a National Monument of Chile in 1971 and is one of the 16 Churches of Chiloé that were declared UNESCO World Heritage Sites on 30 November 2000.

== History and Construction ==
The church was built in 1893, one of around 150 churches built in Chiloé by a Jesuit Mission starting in the 17th Century, continued into the 18th and 19th Centuries by Franciscans. Only around 60 of these churches remain, and of those that do, 16 of these have been declared UNESCO World heritage sites, with the Church of Chonchi being one of them. The churches are built in wood, an example of Chilotan architecture, and mestizo culture. The churches were built by local craftsmen using shipbuilding techniques.

The church of Chonchi is 45 metres long by 18 metres wide, with a 23-metre-tall (75 ft) bell tower. Unfortunately, the tower of the church collapsed in a storm in March 2002, but it was rebuilt. As is typical of the architectural style, the church features an arched entryway, a symmetrical facade with a tower. The facade of the church is painted in blue, white and yellow, and decorated with stars.

== Religious Background ==
The patron saint of the Church of Chonchi is Charles Borromeo, whose feast day is celebrated on 4 November.

This church belongs to the parish of San Carlos, Chonchi, one of the 24 parishes that form the Diocese of Ancud. It is overseen by Bishop Juan Maria Florindo Agurto Muñoz.

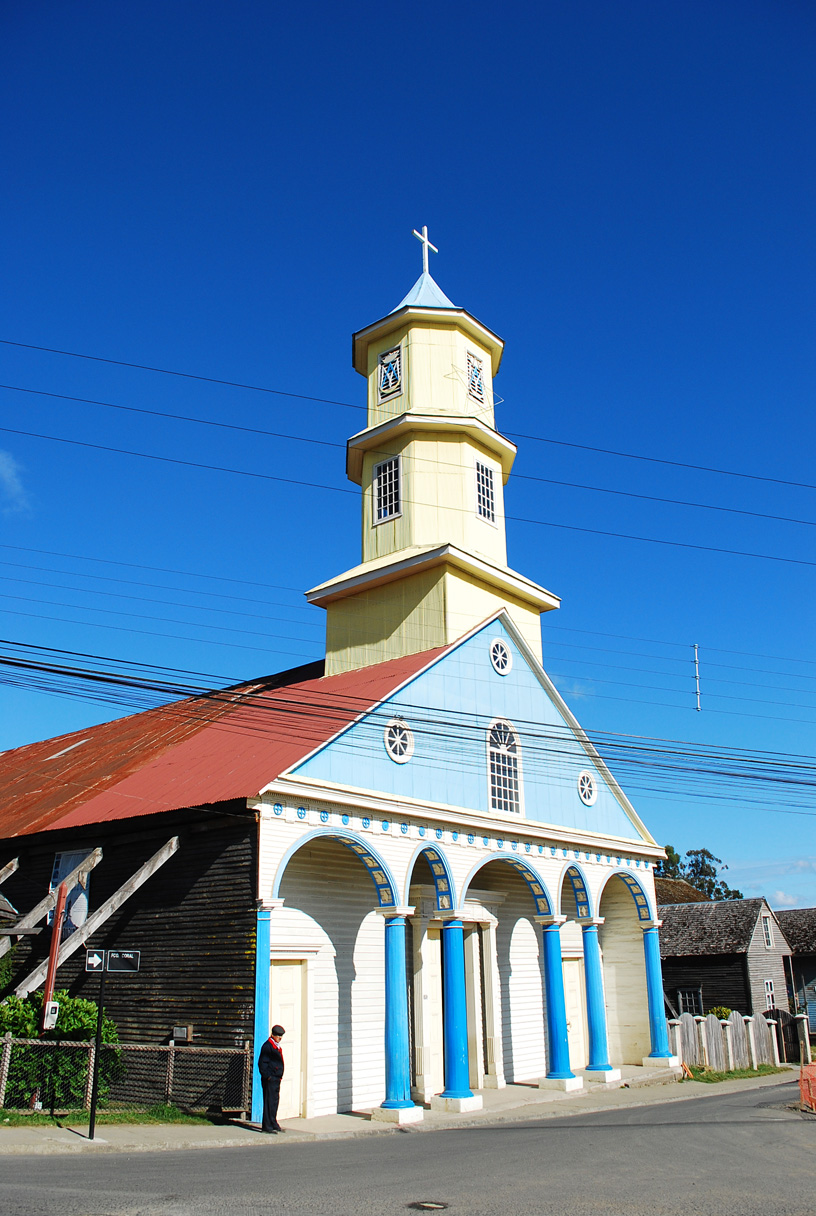

== See also ==
- Churches of Chiloé
