= Church of Vilupulli =

Church of Vilupuili
UNESCO World Heritage Site
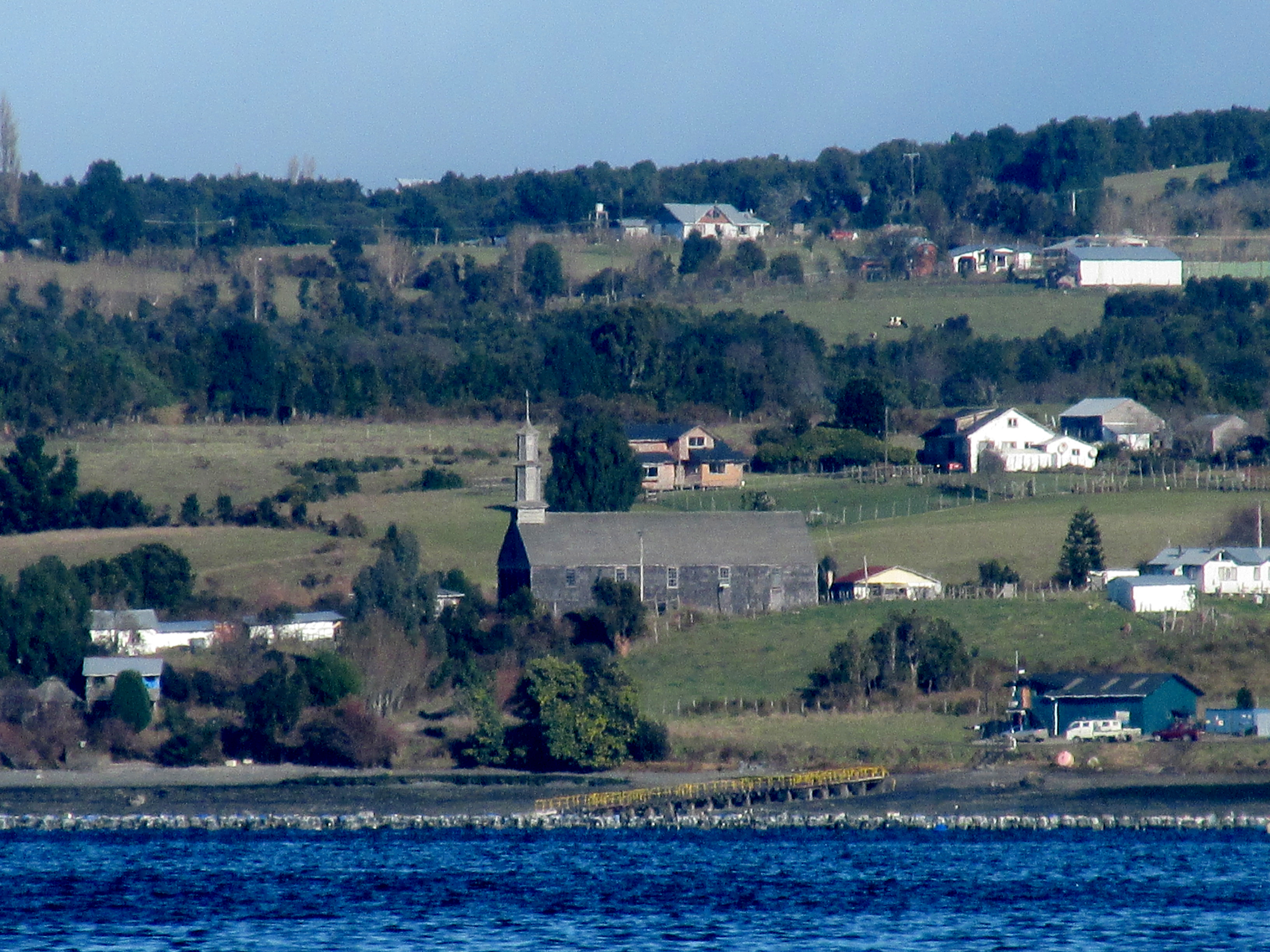
- From the sea of Chiloé

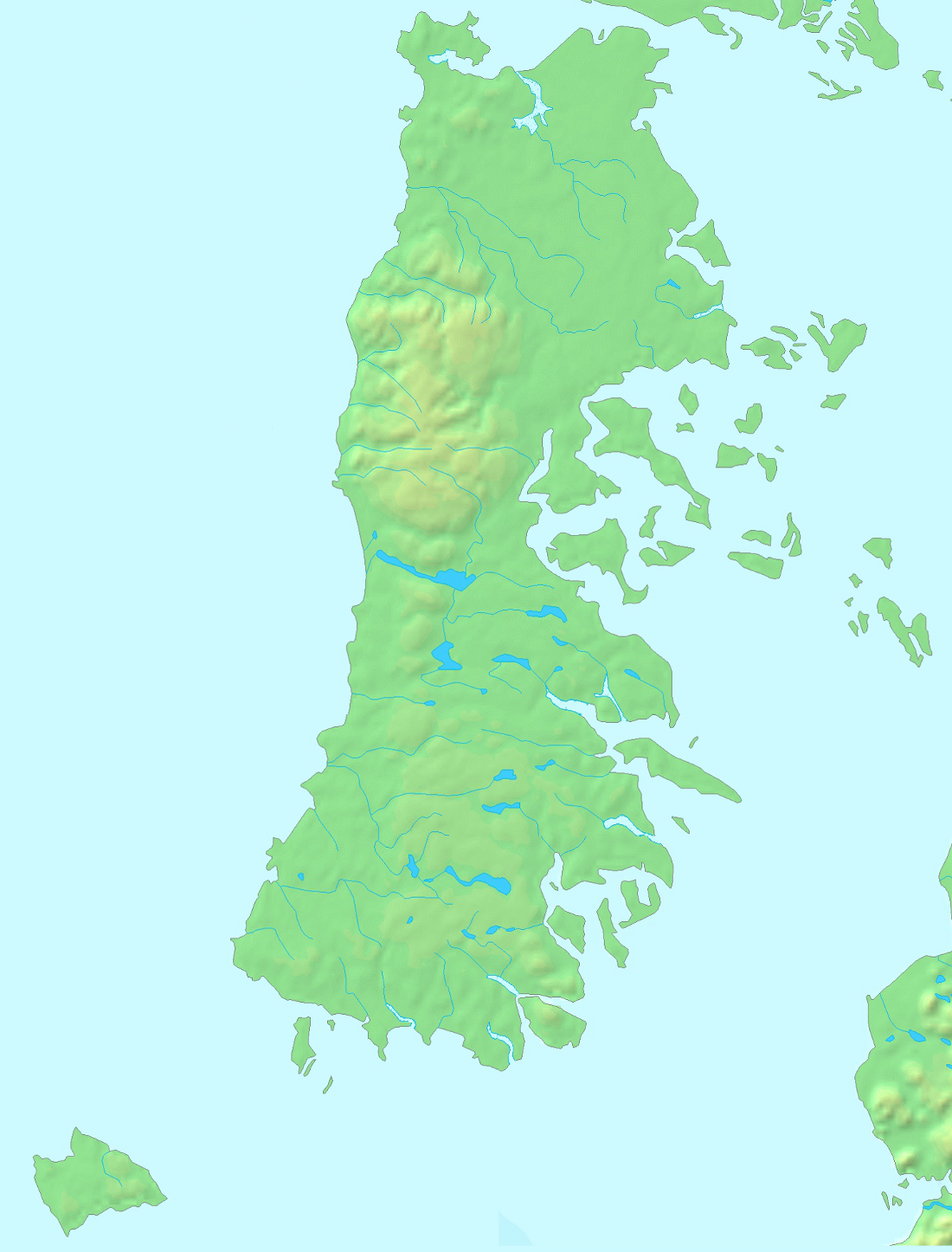
- Location within Chiloé Location within Los Lagos Location within Chile
- Location: Vilupulli, Chonchi, Chiloé Island, Chiloé Province, Los Lagos Region, Chile
- Part of: Churches of Chiloé
- Criteria: Cultural: (ii), (iii)
- Reference: 971-009
- Inscription: 2000 (24th Session)
- Area: 0.54 ha (1.3 acres)
- Coordinates: 42°35′35″S 73°47′18″W

The Church of Vilupulli (Spanish: Iglesia de Vilupulli) is a Catholic church located in the town of Vilupulli, commune of Chonchi, on the Chiloé Archipelago, Los Lagos Region, southern Chile.

The Church of Vilupulli was declared a National Monument of Chile in 1971 and is one of the 16 Churches of Chiloé that were declared UNESCO World Heritage Sites on 30 November 2000.

Likely built at the beginning of the 20th century, the patron saint of the church of Vilupulli is St Anthony – also the patron saint of the Church of Colo – whose feast day is celebrated on June 13.

This church belongs to the parish of San Carlos, Chonchi, one of the 24 parishes that form the Diocese of Ancud.

== History ==
The exact date of the church's construction is unknown. According to Father Gabriel Guarda, at least one part of it is thought to date from the 18th century. According to other sources, the church was built through community cooperation starting in the 20th century.

In 1940, the church's bell was added, requiring a community effort to install.

Reportedly, Charles Darwin may have visited the church in 1843.

== Description ==
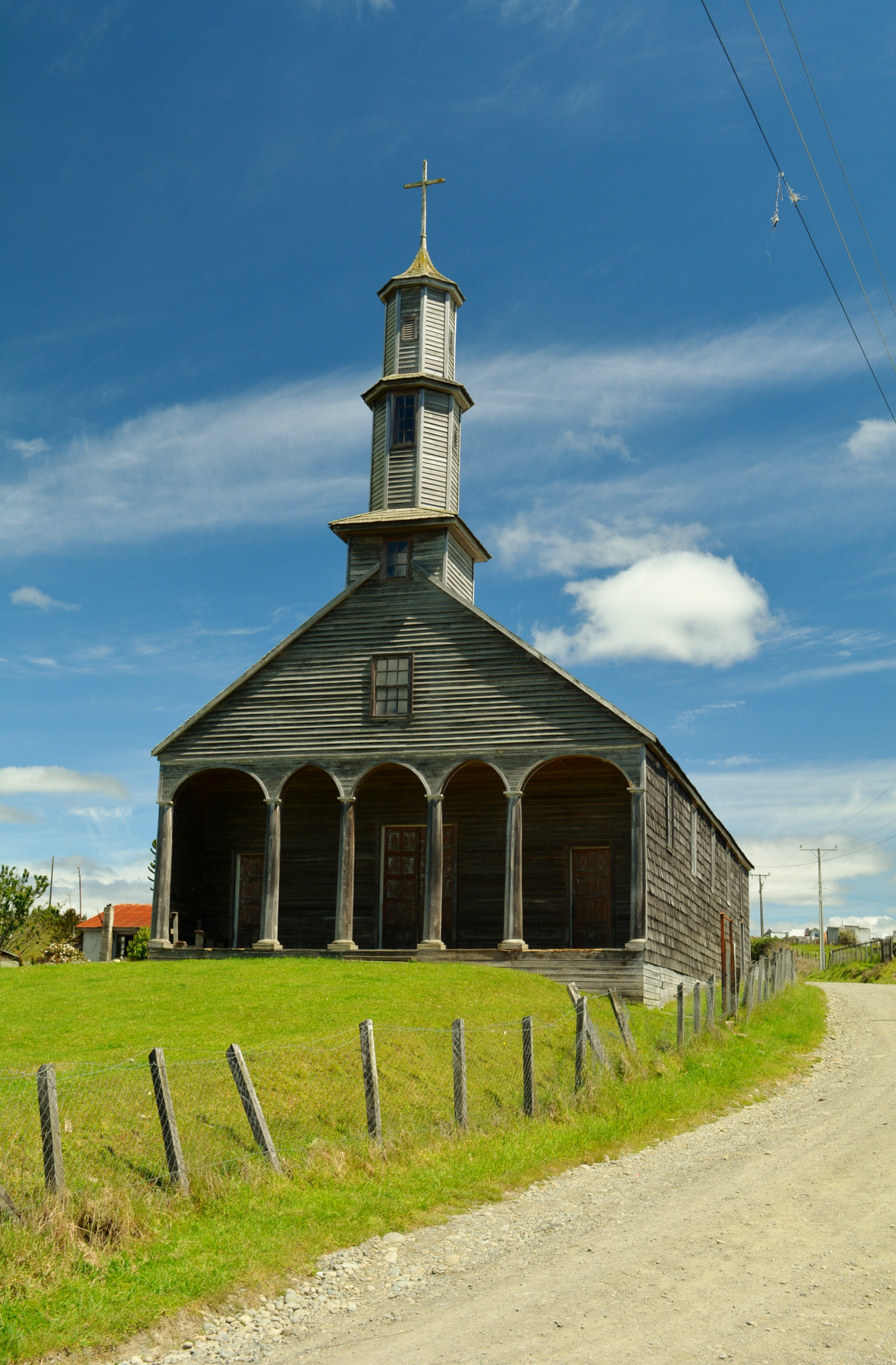
The 18 meter high tower of Church of Vilupulli

The church is 12 m x 28 m in size. Its tower is 18 m high.

== Gallery ==
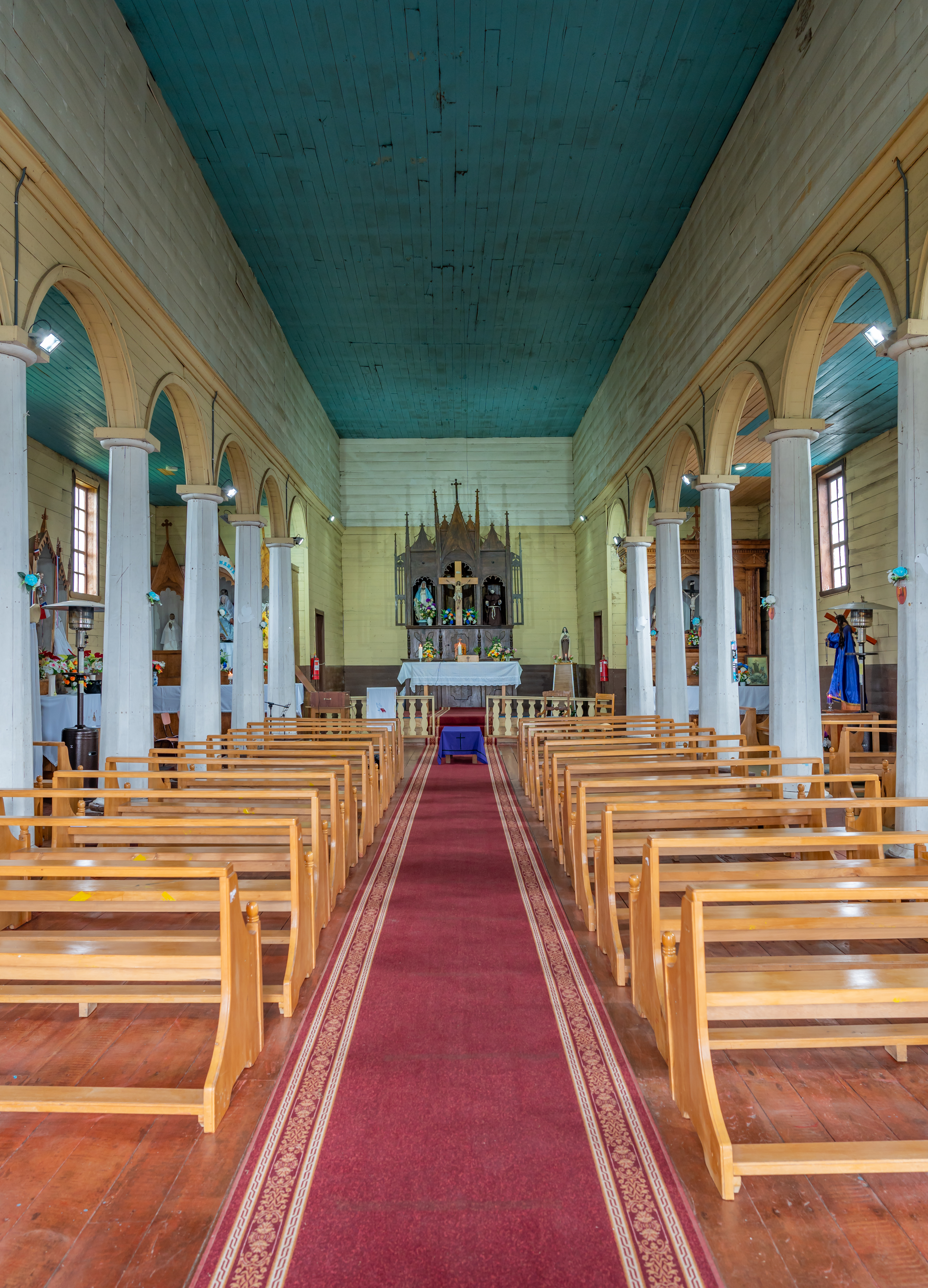
Interior of the church

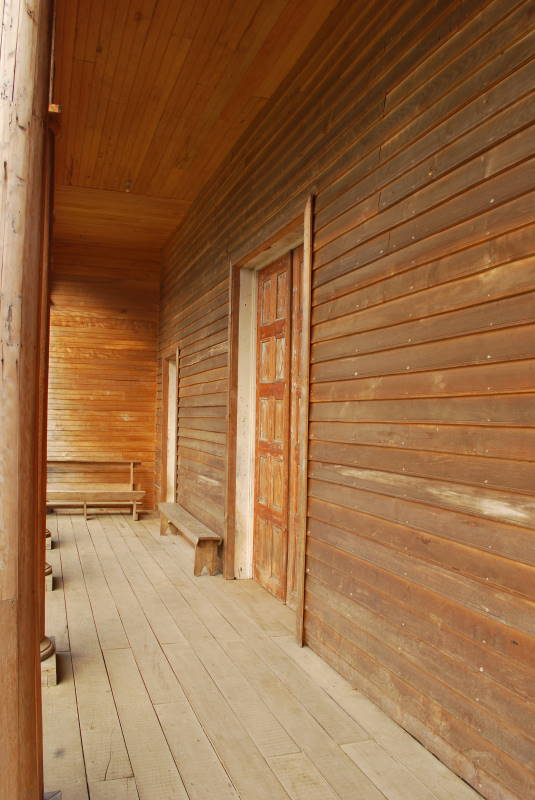
Patio of the church

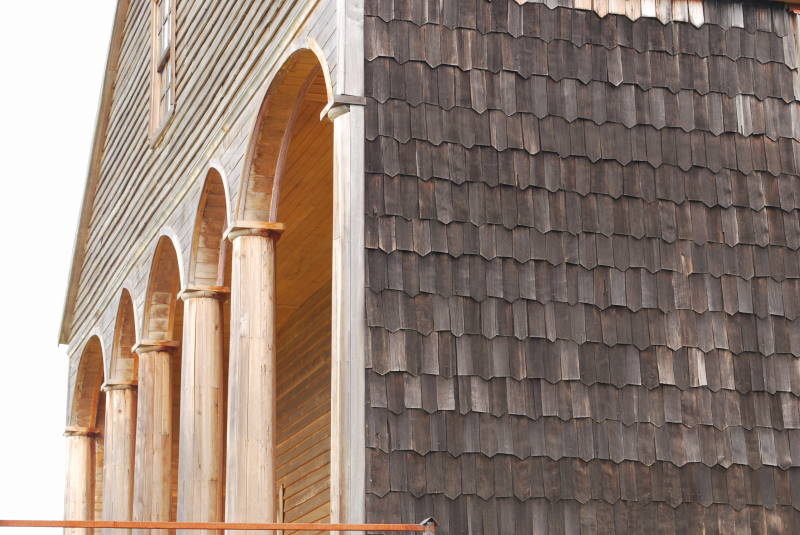
Wooden shingles on the church side

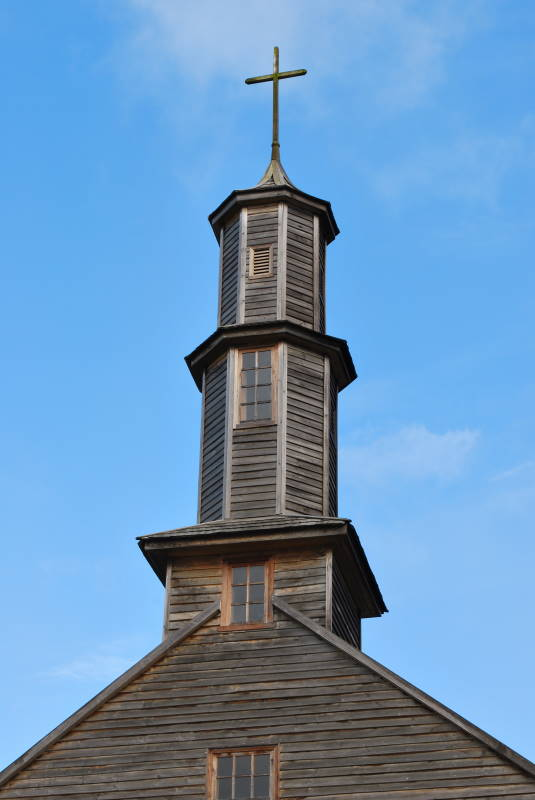
Close up of the tower

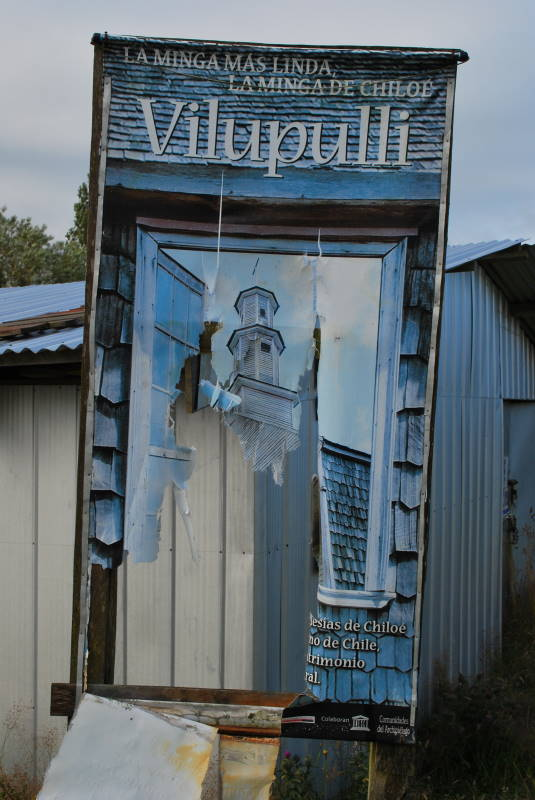
Sign for the church

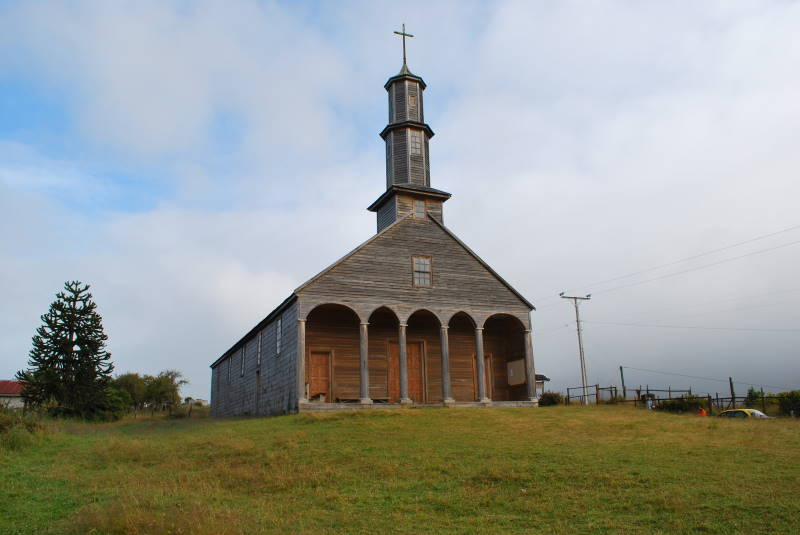
View of the church in the distance

== See also ==
- Churches of Chiloé
