= Church of Chelín =

UNESCO World Heritage Site
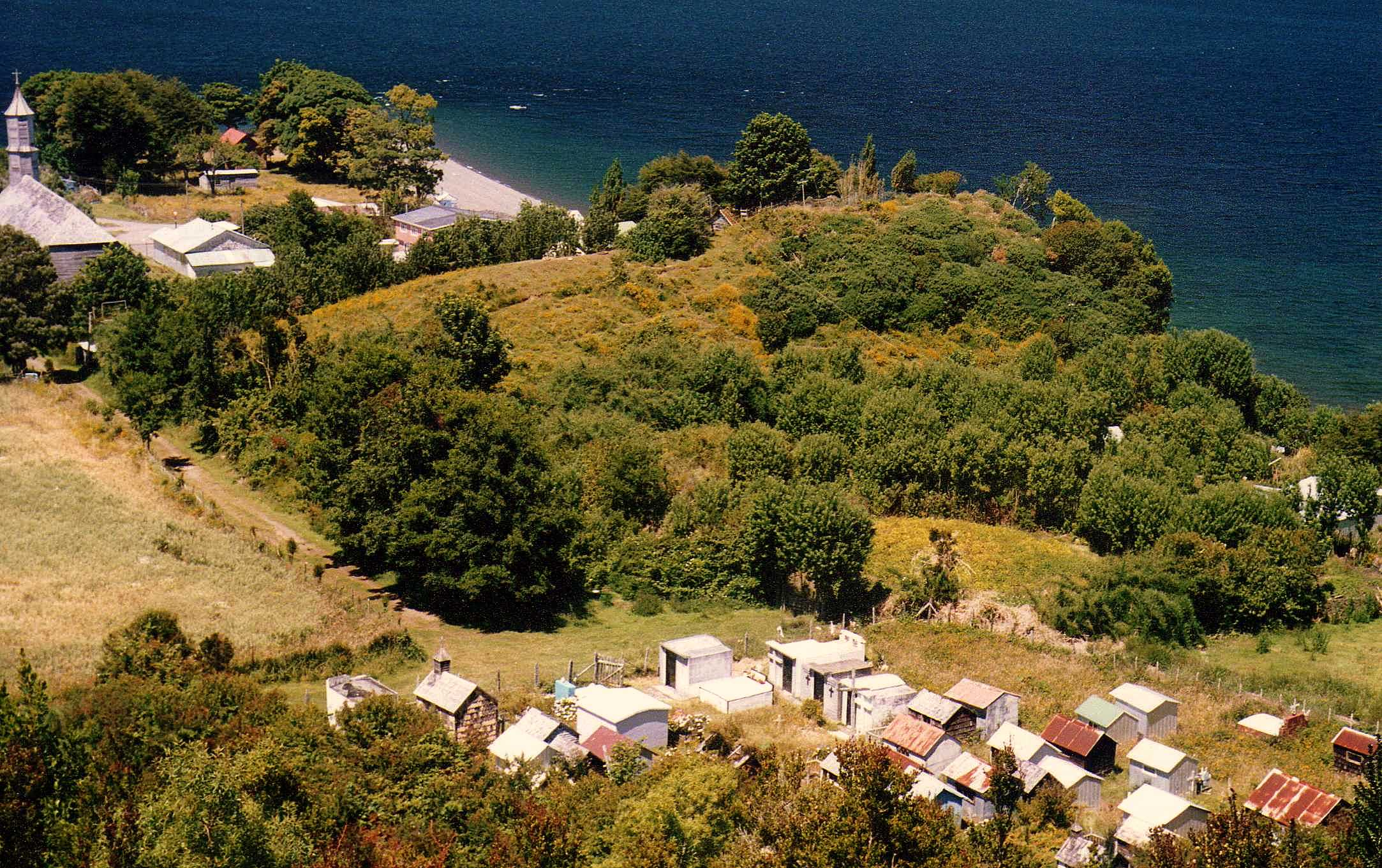
- Church and cemetery of Chelín

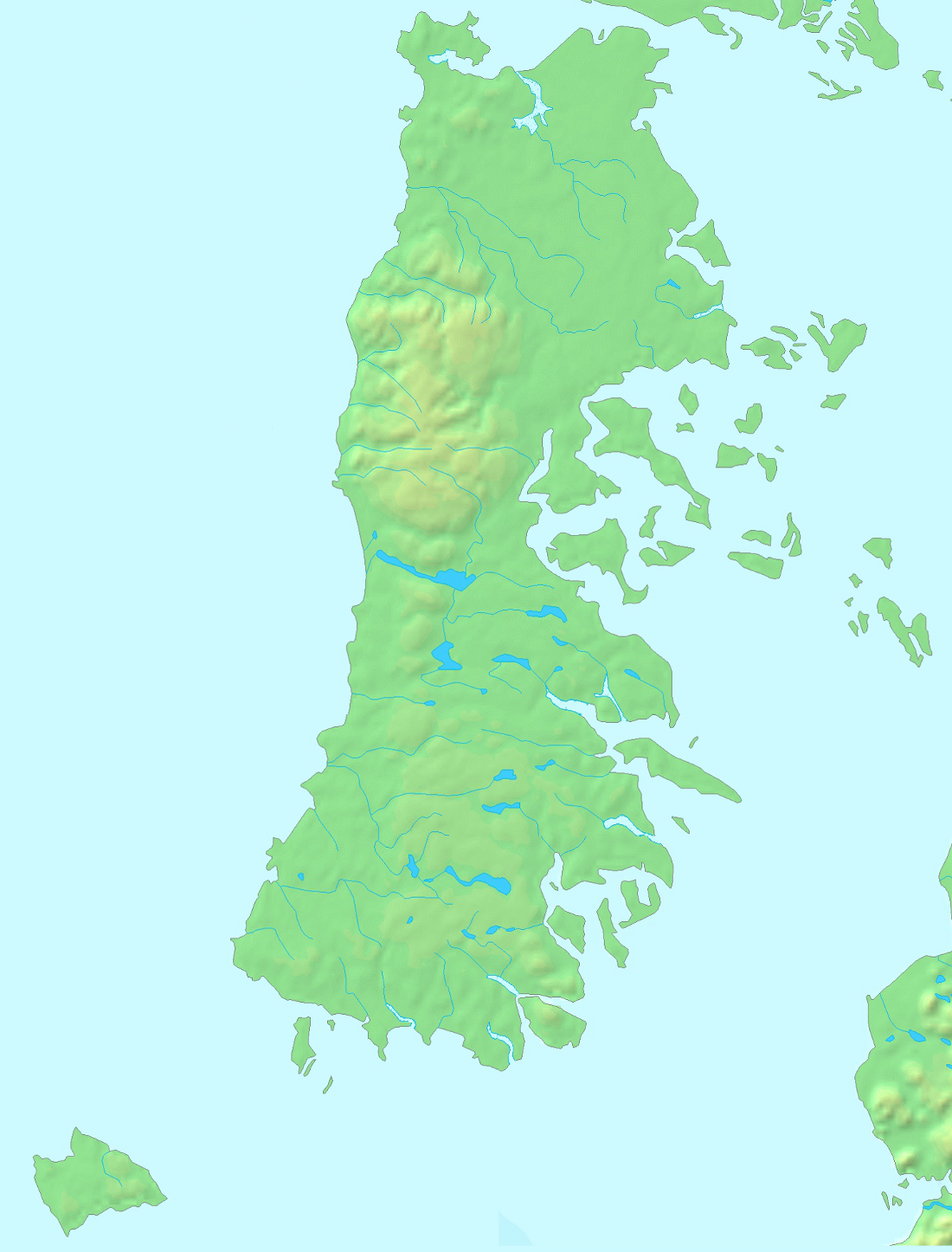
- Location within Chiloé Location within Los Lagos Location within Chile
- Location: Chelín Island, Castro, Chiloé Province, Los Lagos Region, Chile
- Part of: Churches of Chiloé
- Criteria: Cultural: (ii), (iii)
- Reference: 971-015
- Inscription: 2000 (24th Session)
- Coordinates: 42°36′04″S 73°30′58″W

The Church of Chelín (Spanish: Iglesia de Chelín) is a Catholic church located on Chelín Island, commune of Castro, on the Chiloé Archipelago, southern Chile.

The Church of Chelín was declared a National Monument of Chile in 2000 and is one of the 16 Churches of Chiloé that were declared UNESCO World Heritage Sites on 30 November 2000.

Construction of the church, built from wood, was completed in 1888 and it was restored in 1990. The patron saint of the church is Our Lady of the Rosary, whose feast day is celebrated on August 30.

This church leads one of the 24 parishes that form the Diocese of Ancud.
