= Church of Detif =

UNESCO World Heritage Site
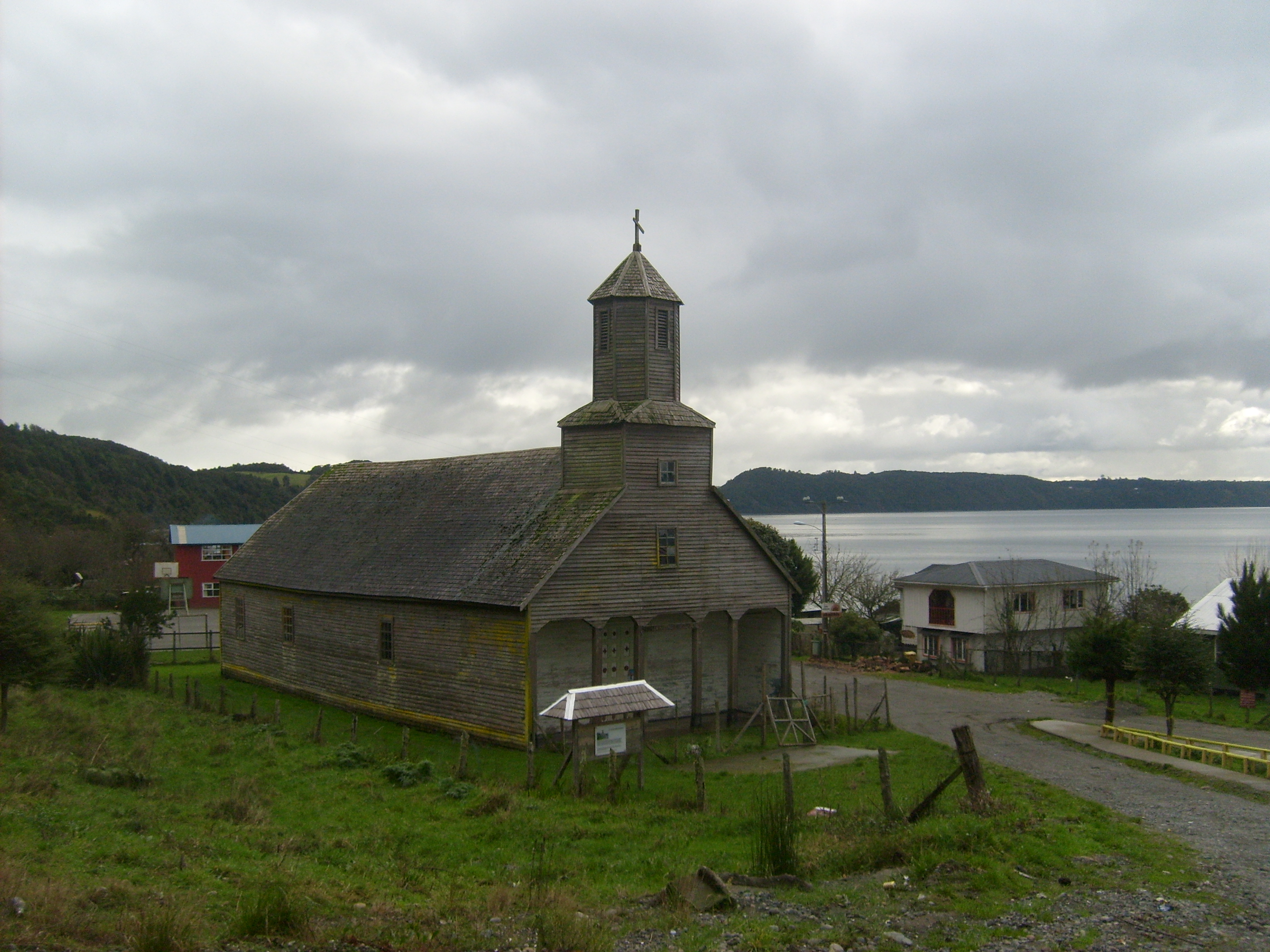

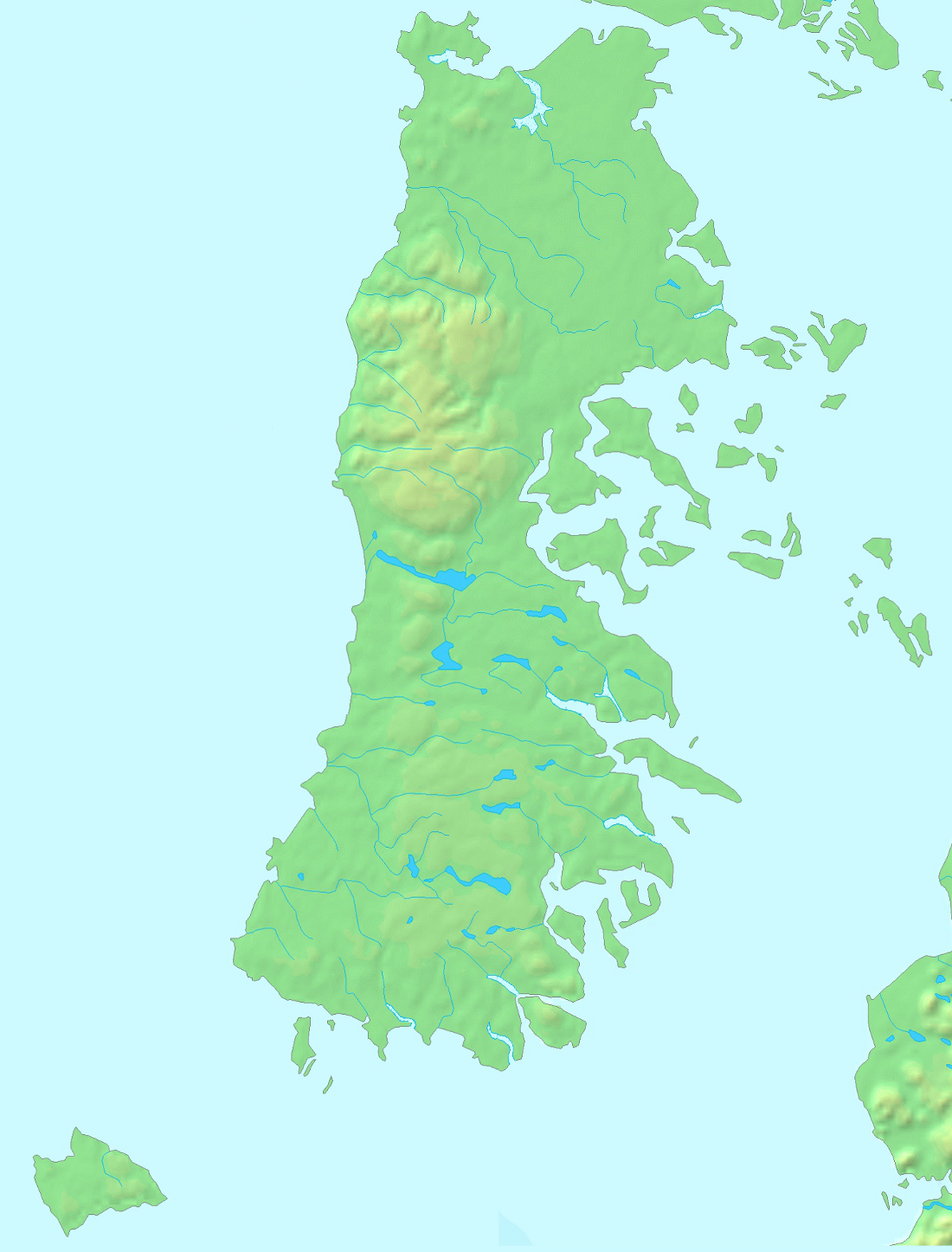
- Location within Chiloé Location within Los Lagos Location within Chile
- Location: Detif, Puqueldón, Lemuy Island, Chiloé Province, Los Lagos Region, Chile
- Part of: Churches of Chiloé
- Criteria: Cultural: (ii), (iii)
- Reference: 971-008
- Inscription: 2000 (24th Session)
- Area: 4.87 ha (12.0 acres)
- Coordinates: 42°41′06″S 73°33′24″W

The Church of Detif — Spanish: Iglesia de Detif— is a Catholic church located in the town of Detif, commune of Puqueldón, on Lemuy Island, Chiloé Archipelago, southern Chile.

The Church of Detif was declared a National Monument of Chile in 1999 and is one of the 16 Churches of Chiloé that were declared UNESCO World Heritage Sites on 30 November 2000.

The patron saint of the church is Our Lady of Lourdes, whose feast day is celebrated on March 25.

This church belongs to the parish of San Pedro Nolasco, Puqueldón, one of the 24 parishes that form the Diocese of Ancud.

== History ==
The first chapel in Detif was built in 1734. The current church was built in the town center, close to the beach, at the beginning of the 19th century. Built on a stone base to protect it from soil humidity, the church was made from coigue and alerce wood and lined with alerce tiles. Due to the scarcity of metals on the islands of Lemuy and Chiloé, wooden rivets were used in place of iron nails.

The church was restored in 1996 and again in 2001. For the second restoration, tiles on the superior part of the facade were replaced by panels.

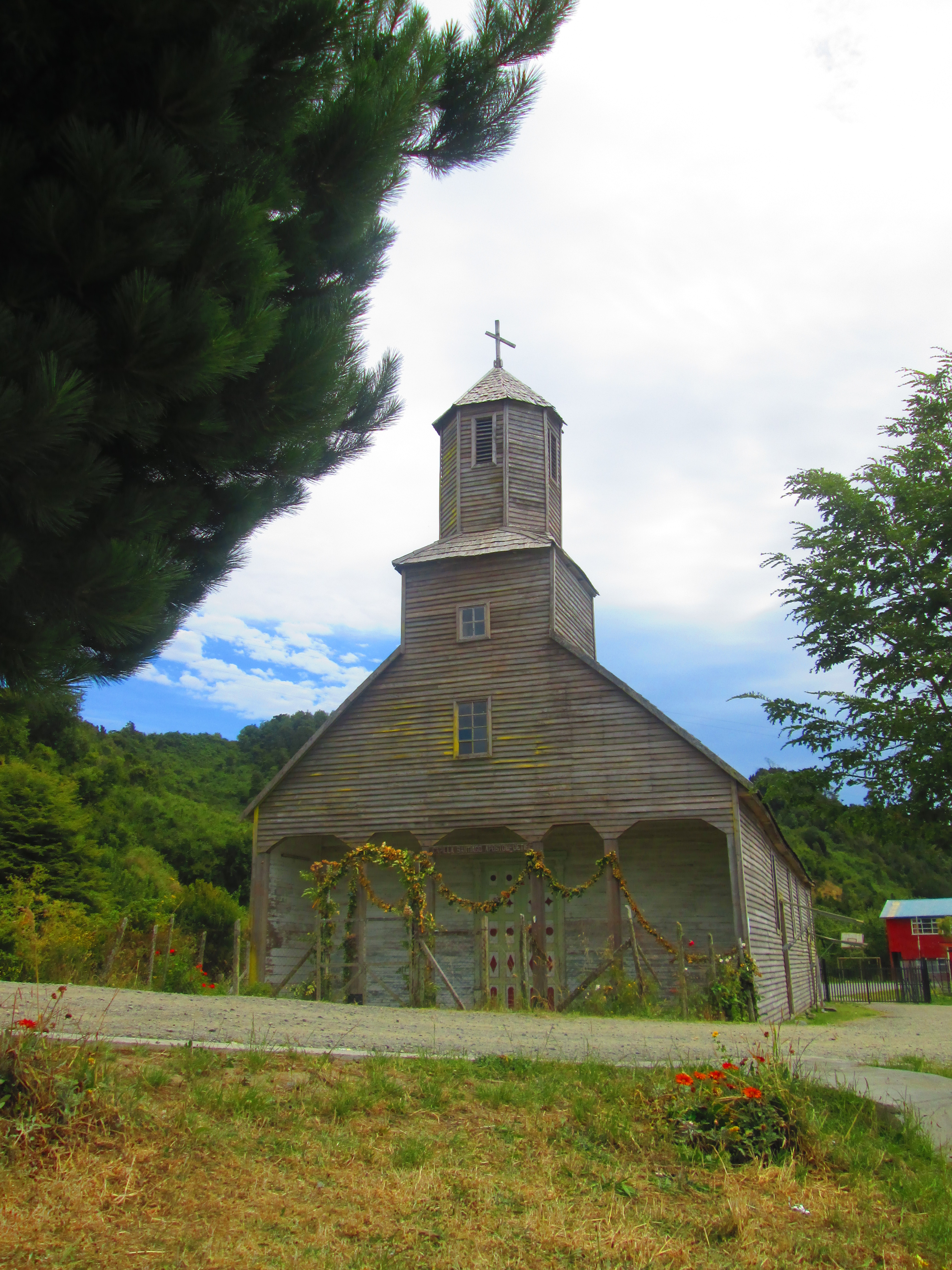

== See also ==
- Churches of Chiloé
