= Church of Our Lady of Sorrows, Dalcahue =

Church of Dalcahue
UNESCO World Heritage Site
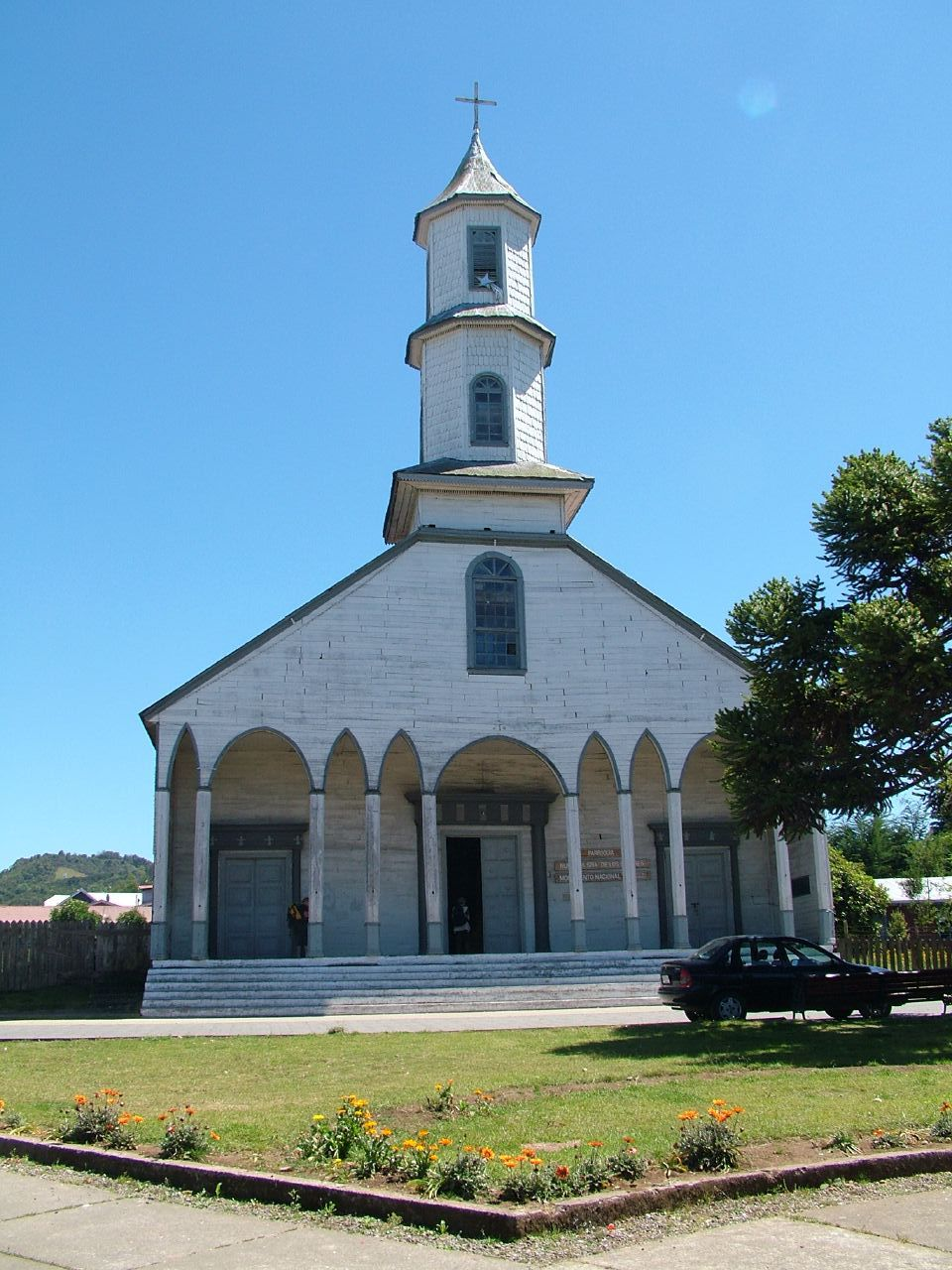

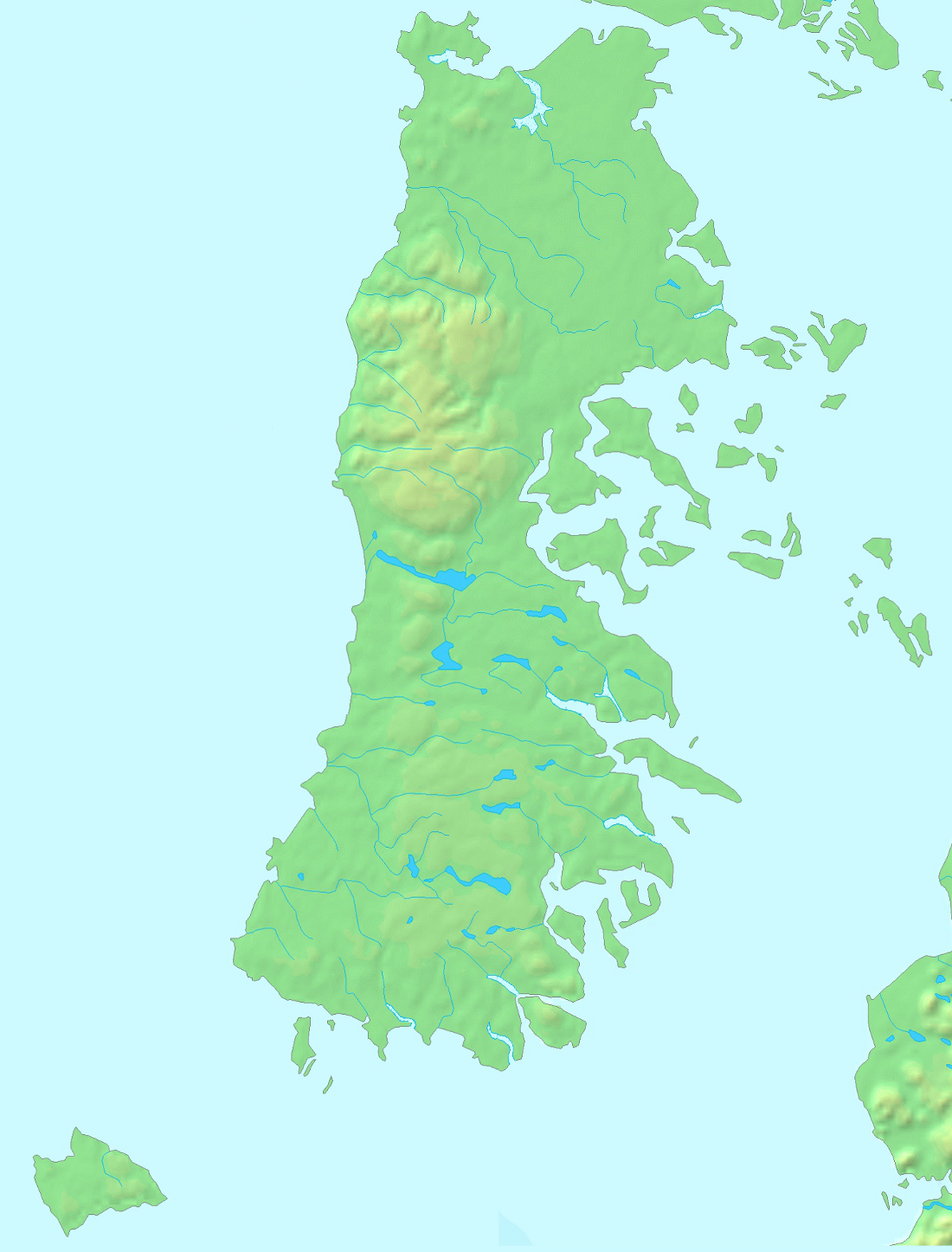
- Location within Chiloé Location within Los Lagos Location within Chile
- Location: Dalcahue, Chiloé Island, Chiloé Province, Los Lagos Region, Chile
- Part of: Churches of Chiloé
- Criteria: Cultural: (ii), (iii)
- Reference: 971-014
- Inscription: 2000 (24th Session)
- Area: 1.56 ha (3.9 acres)
- Coordinates: 42°18′36″S 73°39′07″W

The Church of Our Lady of Sorrows (Spanish: Iglesia de Nuestra Señora de los Dolores) in Dalcahue, also known simply as Church of Dalcahue (Spanish: Iglesia de Dalcahue), is a Catholic church located in the town's main square, on Chiloé Island, Chile.

The Church of Our Lady of Sorrows was declared a National Monument of Chile in 1971 and is one of the 16 Churches of Chiloé that were declared UNESCO World Heritage Sites on 30 November 2000.

It was built at the end of the 19th century in a site formerly occupied by a Jesuit missionary chapel.

This church leads one of the 24 parishes that form the Diocese of Ancud.
