= Church of San Juan Bautista, Dalcahue =

Church of San Juan
UNESCO World Heritage Site
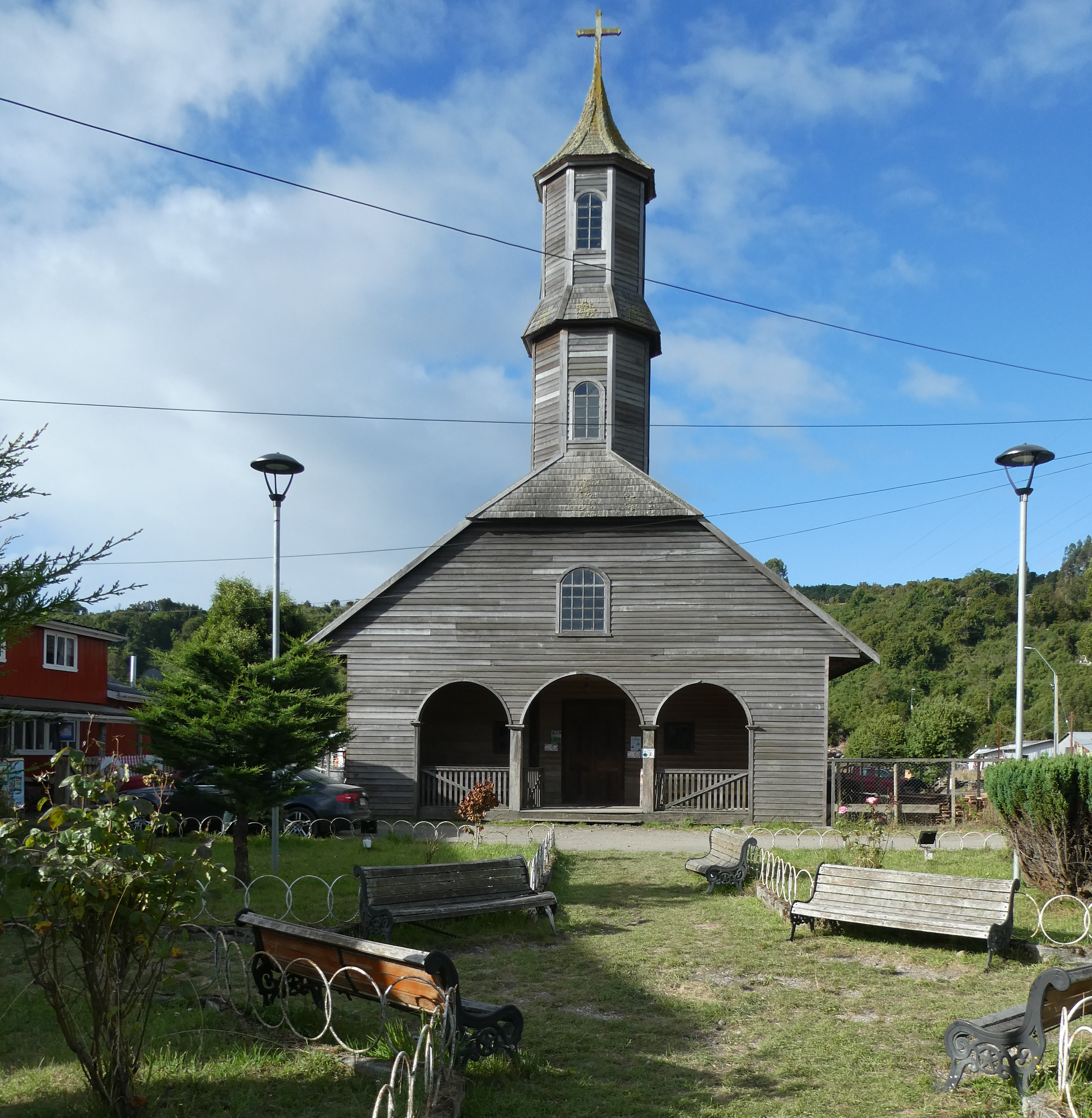
- San Juan Church's facade

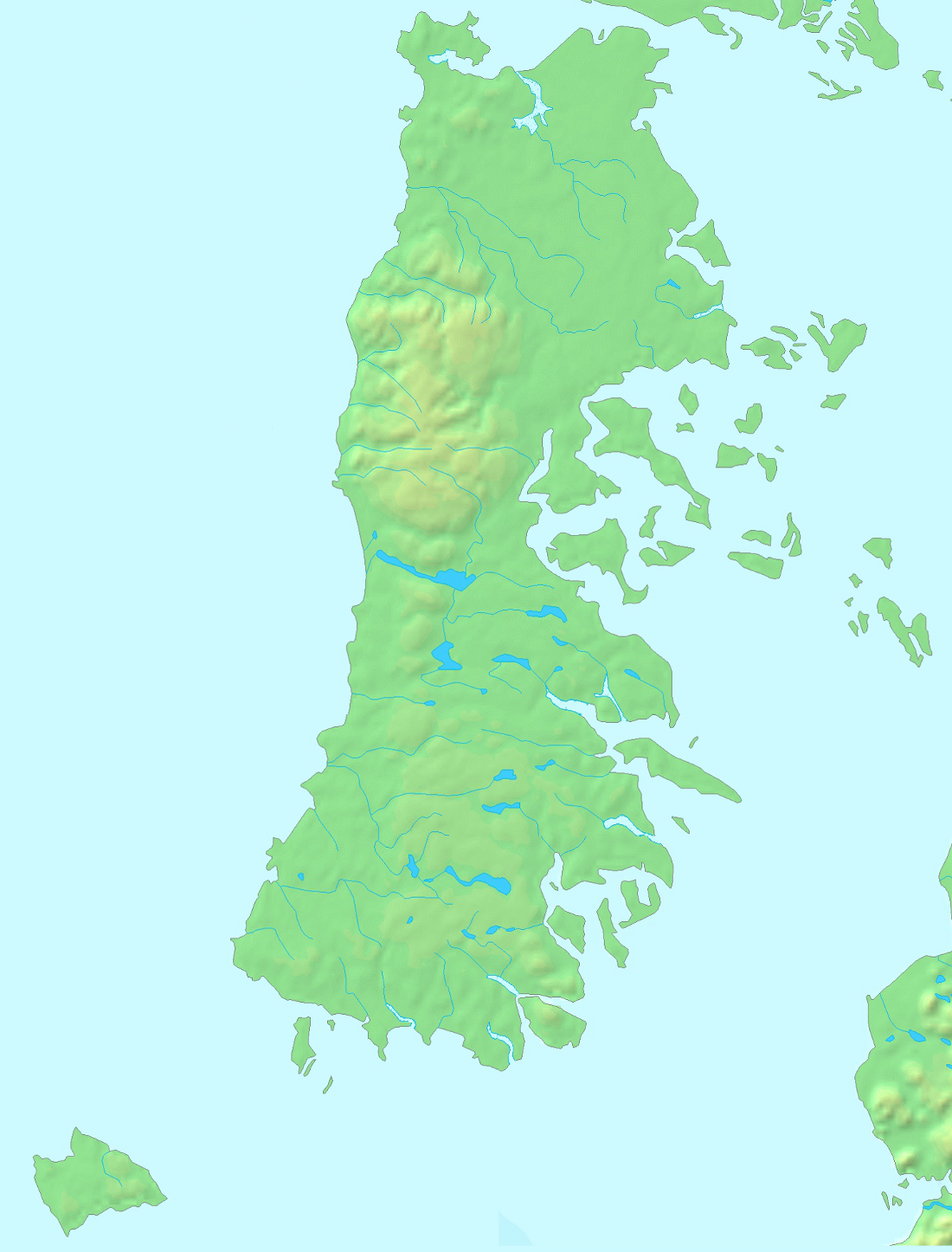
- Location within Chiloé Location within Los Lagos Location within Chile
- Location: Dalcahue, Chiloé Island, Chiloé Province, Los Lagos Region, Chile
- Part of: Churches of Chiloé
- Criteria: Cultural: (ii), (iii)
- Reference: 971-013
- Inscription: 2000 (24th Session)
- Area: 0.186 ha (0.46 acres)
- Coordinates: 42°20′06″S 73°30′15″W

The Church of San Juan Bautista de San Juan de Coquihuil (Spanish: Iglesia de San Juan Bautista de San Juan de Coquihuil) is a Roman Catholic church located in the Chilean hamlet of San Juan, commune of Dalcahue in Chiloé Island. Commonly referred to as «Church of San Juan» —Spanish: Iglesia de San Juan—, is within the Diocese of Ancud; its construction was finished around 1887.

This church is one of the 16 traditional Chiloé wooden churches built in the 18th and 19th centuries that were declared as a World Heritage site under Churches of Chiloé's denomination because of their unique form of wooden architecture known as the Chilota School of Religious Architecture on Wood.
