= Lemuy Island =

Island in Chile

Native name: Isla Lemuy
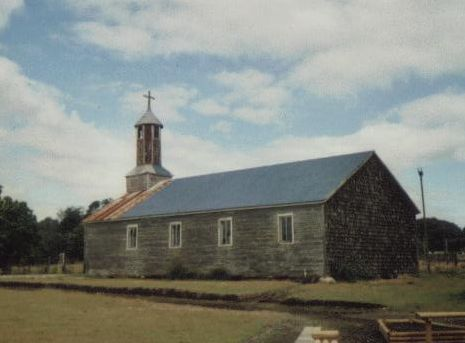
- Church in San Agustín

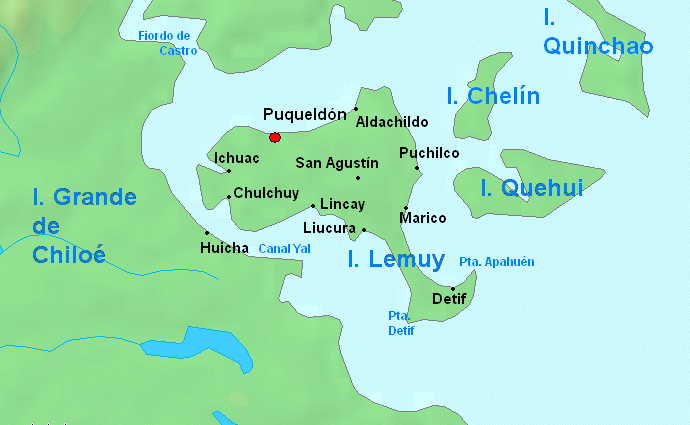

Geography
- Coordinates: 42.600°S 73.667°W
- Adjacent to: Pacific Ocean
- Area: 97 km^{2} (37 sq mi)

Administration
- Chile
- Region: Los Lagos
- Province: Chiloé
- Commune: Puqueldón

Demographics
- Population: 4,125 (2002 Census)

Additional information
- NGA UFI=-888840

Lemuy Island is an island in Chiloé Archipelago, Chile, off the eastern coast of Chiloé Island.

There are nine villages on the island. On the north coast:

- Puqueldón
- Aldachildo
- Ichuac

On the south coast:

- Chulchuy. From here the ferry leaves for Huicha on Chiloé Island.
- Lincay, with a wooden church dating from the beginning of the 20th century
- Liucura, with a wooden church which was built in the middle of the 19th century

On the east coast:

- Detif
- Puchilco. In the wooden church dating from the 19th century there are paintings by the Peruvian artist Miguel Gamarra

In the middle of the island:

- San Agustín, the only village which is not on the coast. The wooden church was built at the beginning of the 20th century.

As in the rest of the archipelago, the population of Lemuy Island were inspired by a deep religious faith and built 8 churches, each special in its own way. Some, like Ichuac, Aldachildo and Detif are more than 100 years old and have recently been declared World Heritage Sites, along with 15 other Chilote churches. Some have picturesque cemeteries with little shingled mausoleums.

== See also ==
- List of islands of Chile
