= Church of Nercón =

UNESCO World Heritage Site
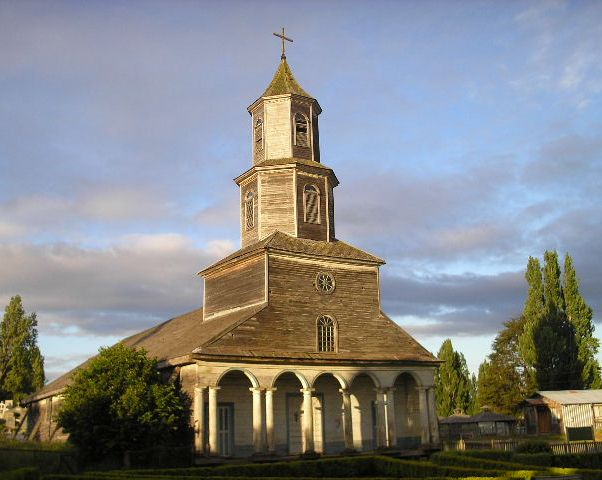
- Church of Nercón facade

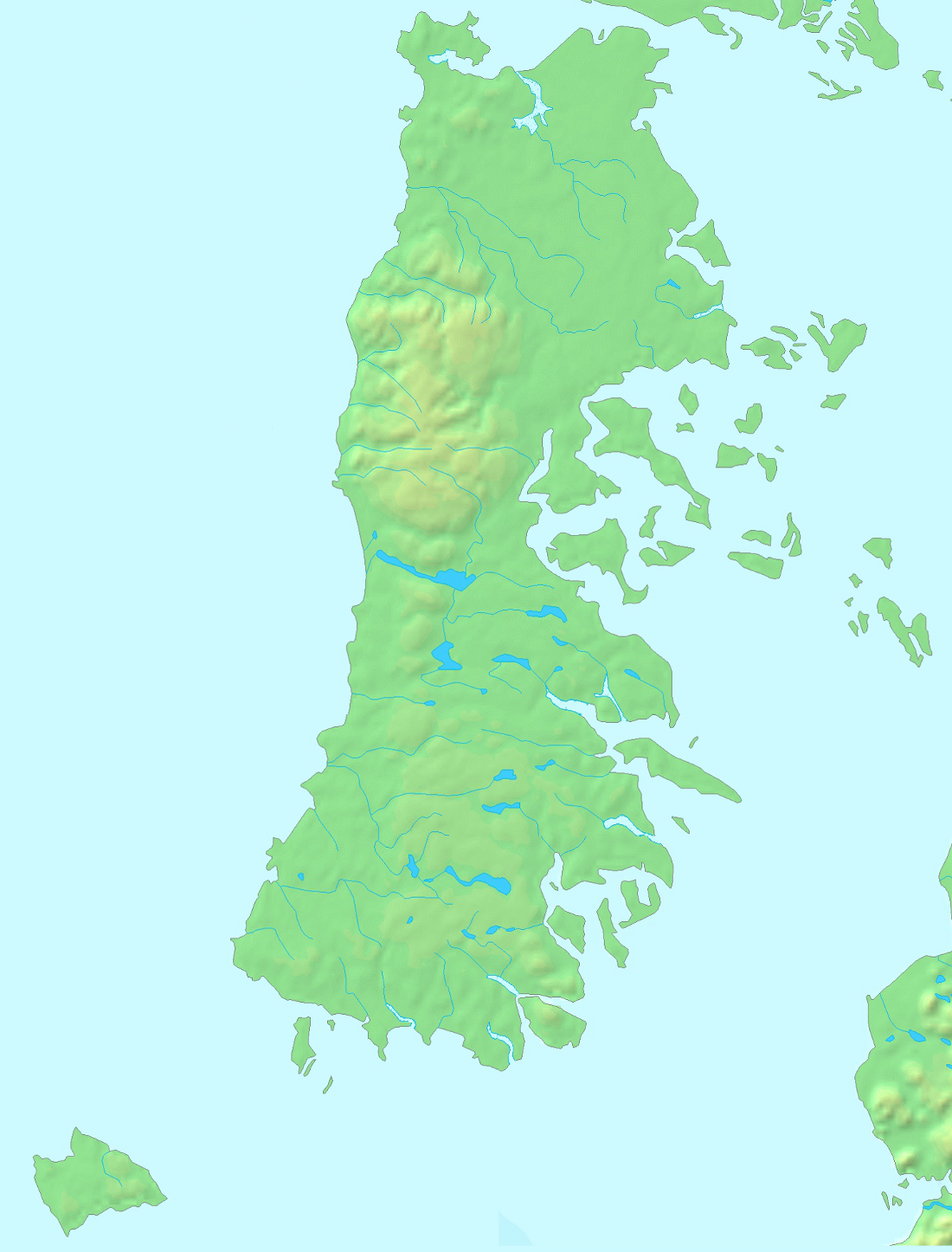
- Location within Chiloé Location within Los Lagos Location within Chile
- Location: Nercón, Castro, Chiloé Island, Chiloé Province, Los Lagos Region, Chile
- Part of: Churches of Chiloé
- Criteria: Cultural: (ii), (iii)
- Reference: 971-005
- Inscription: 2000 (24th Session)
- Area: 0.64 ha (1.6 acres)
- Coordinates: 42°29′33″S 73°46′50″W

The Church of Nercón —Spanish: Iglesia de Señora de Gracia de Nercón— is a UNESCO World Heritage Site. It is a Church on the Chiloé Island in Chiloé, Chile. It is in the town of Nercón, about 4 km from the town of Castro.

The Church was constructed around 1890, from cypress and larch wood. It is 40 metres long, 15 metres wide, and has a tower that stretches 25 metres high. Inside there is a sculpture of Saint Michael with a demon at his feet that was made with only one piece of wood, and the interior paint makes it appear as though it were marble.

The patron saint days celebrated at this Church include the Our Lady of Grace on 8 September and Saint Michael the Archangel on 29 September.

It was declared a National Monument by the Chilean government 27 July 1984. It is one of the 16 Churches of Chiloé that were declared UNESCO World Heritage Sites on 30 November 2000.

The Church began a process of restoration in January 2012. The architect of the restoration was Katerine Araya, and the head carpenter is Simón Cárcamo.

The Church is considered an exemplar of Chiloé's traditional architecture. The Church that stands today is not the original one, because it was rebuilt in 1879. Construction was completed in 1895.

When the restoration of the Church commenced and the foundation was examined, the architect's team found bone fragments and skulls under the foundation of the Church. The Council of National Monuments was informed. Araya affirmed that the findings would be treated according to the Law of National Monuments which has stipulations for archeological findings.

The decision to remove the cupola of the Church generated controversy. Also the cypress and larch woods are unavailable, so the rotting wood will be replaced with other, more common woods, which is generating controversy among residents. As much of the original wood will be reused, however. The problem occurs because of the constant rains in Chiloé.
