= Church of Aldachildo =

UNESCO World Heritage Site
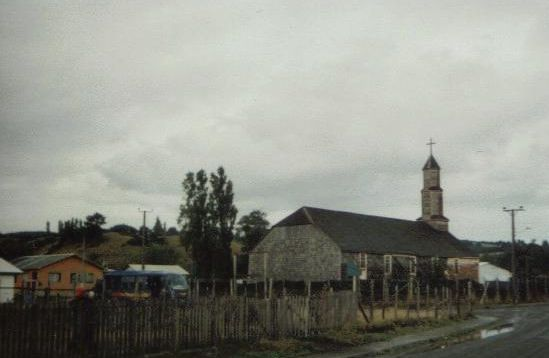

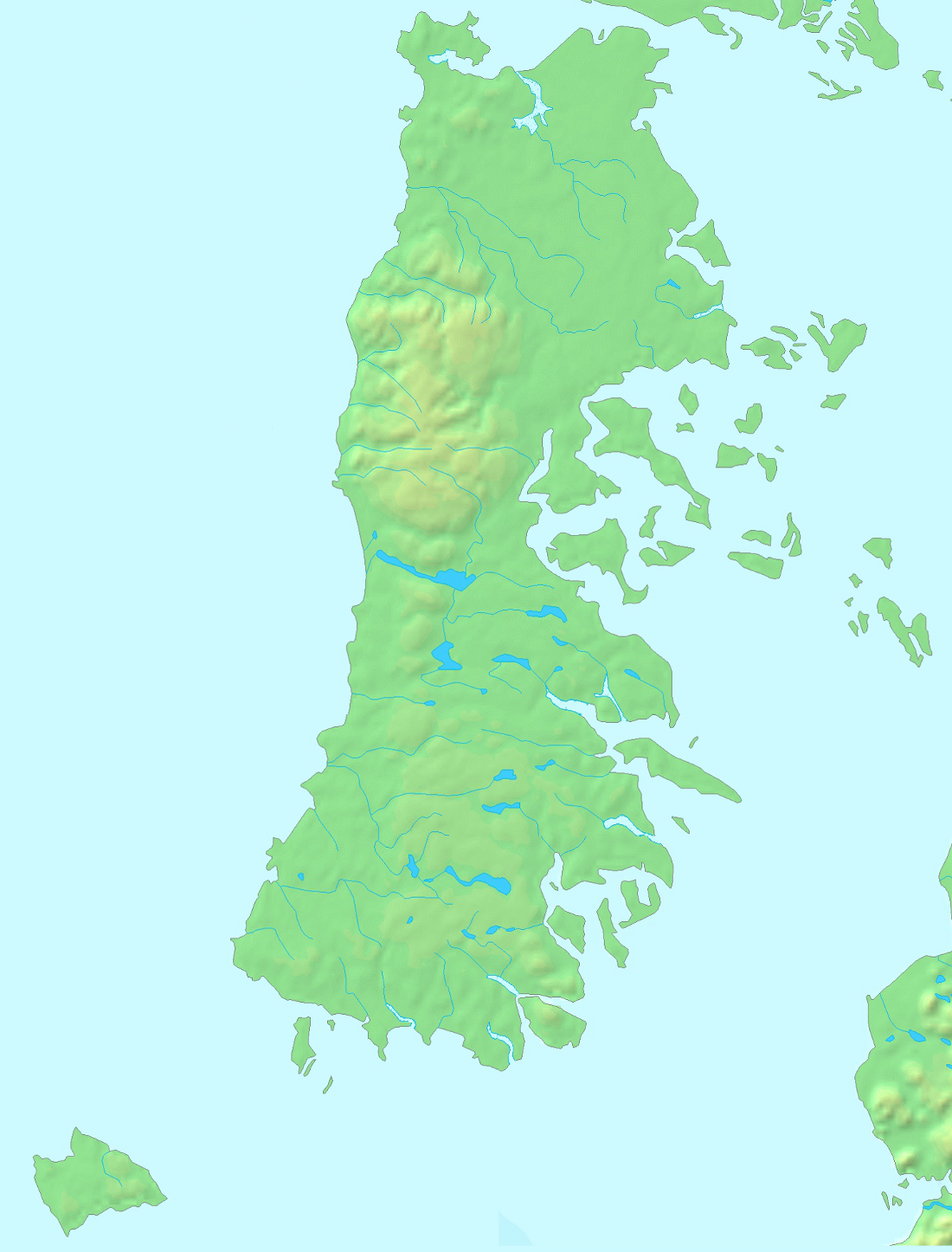
- Location within Chiloé Location within Los Lagos Location within Chile
- Location: Aldachildo, Puqueldón, Lemuy Island, Chiloé Province, Los Lagos Region, Chile
- Part of: Churches of Chiloé
- Criteria: Cultural: (ii), (iii)
- Reference: 971-006
- Inscription: 2000 (24th Session)
- Area: 4.16 ha (10.3 acres)
- Coordinates: 42°35′02″S 73°36′44″W

The Church of Aldachildo or Church of Jesus of Nazareth— Spanish: Iglesia de Aldachildo; Iglesia de Jesús Nazareno— is a Catholic church located in the town of Aldachildo, commune of Puqueldón, on Lemuy Island, Chiloé Archipelago, southern Chile.

The Church of Aldachildo was declared a National Monument of Chile in 1999 and is one of the 16 Churches of Chiloé that were declared UNESCO World Heritage Sites on 30 November 2000.

The patron saint of the church is Jesus of Nazareth, also the patron saint of the Church of Caguach, whose feast day is celebrated on August 30 and also on the third Sunday of January.

The Church of Aldachildo was completed at the end of the 19th century and has not been subject to reparations or replacement of materials. It is currently in good condition although there has been some deterioration of the exterior and nave panels.

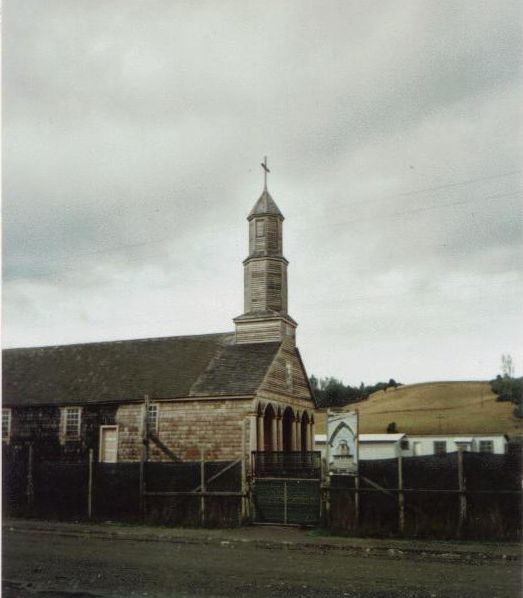

== See also ==
- Churches of Chiloé
