= Church of Colo =

UNESCO World Heritage Site
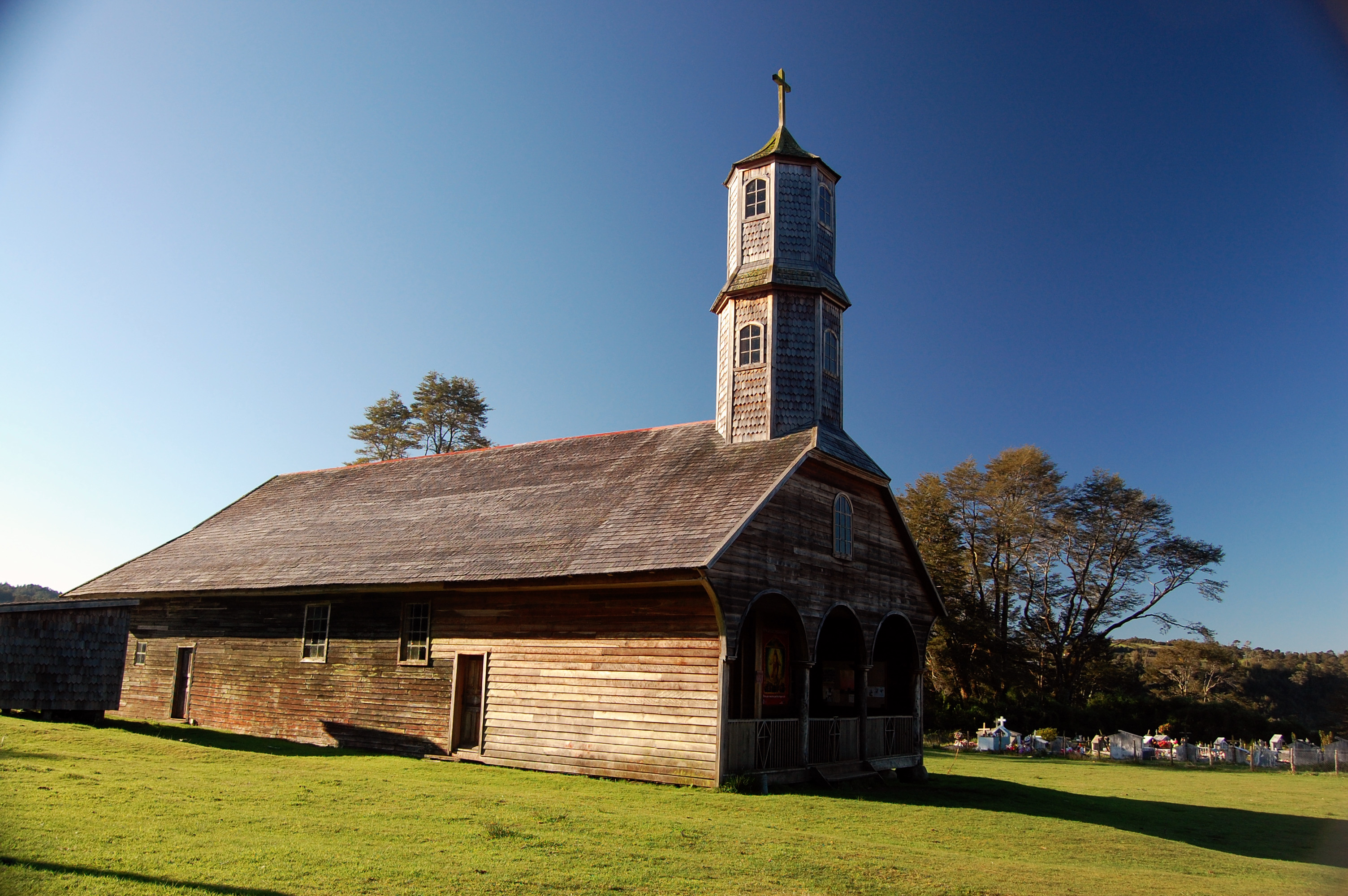

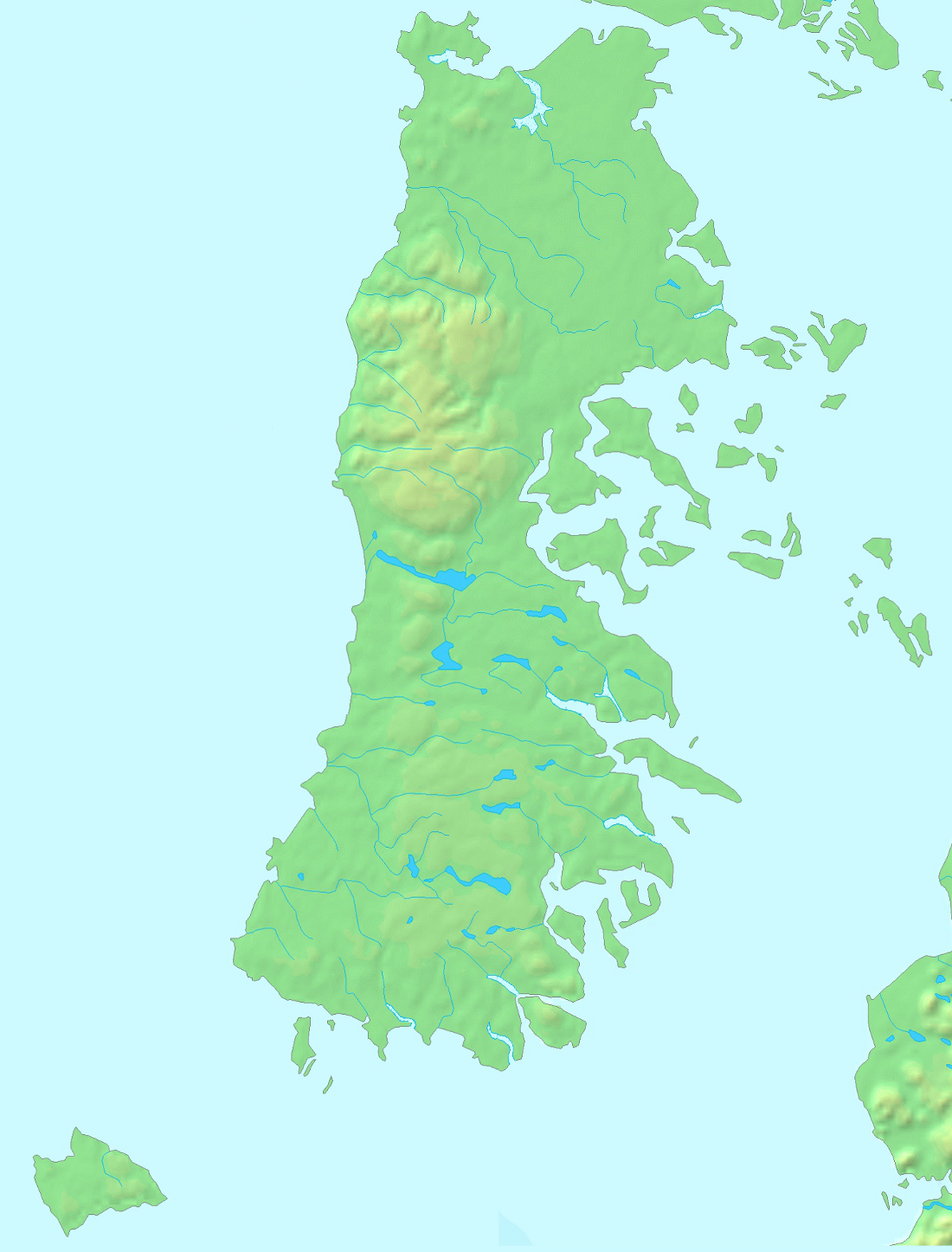
- Location within Chiloé Location within Los Lagos Location within Chile
- Location: Colo, Quemchi, Chiloé Island, Chiloé Province, Los Lagos Region, Chile
- Part of: Churches of Chiloé
- Criteria: Cultural: (ii), (iii)
- Reference: 971-012
- Inscription: 2000 (24th Session)
- Area: 0.5 ha (1.2 acres)
- Coordinates: 42°15′00″S 73°21′58″W

The Church of Colo —Spanish: Iglesia de Colo— is a Catholic church located in the town of Colo, Quemchi commune, on the Chiloé Archipelago, southern Chile.

The Church of Colo was declared a National Monument of Chile in 1999 and is one of the 16 Churches of Chiloé that were declared UNESCO World Heritage Sites on 30 November 2000.

The church was built from wood around 1890 and remains in good condition. Its patron saint is St Anthony, also the patron saint of the Church of Vilupulli, whose feast day is celebrated on June 13.

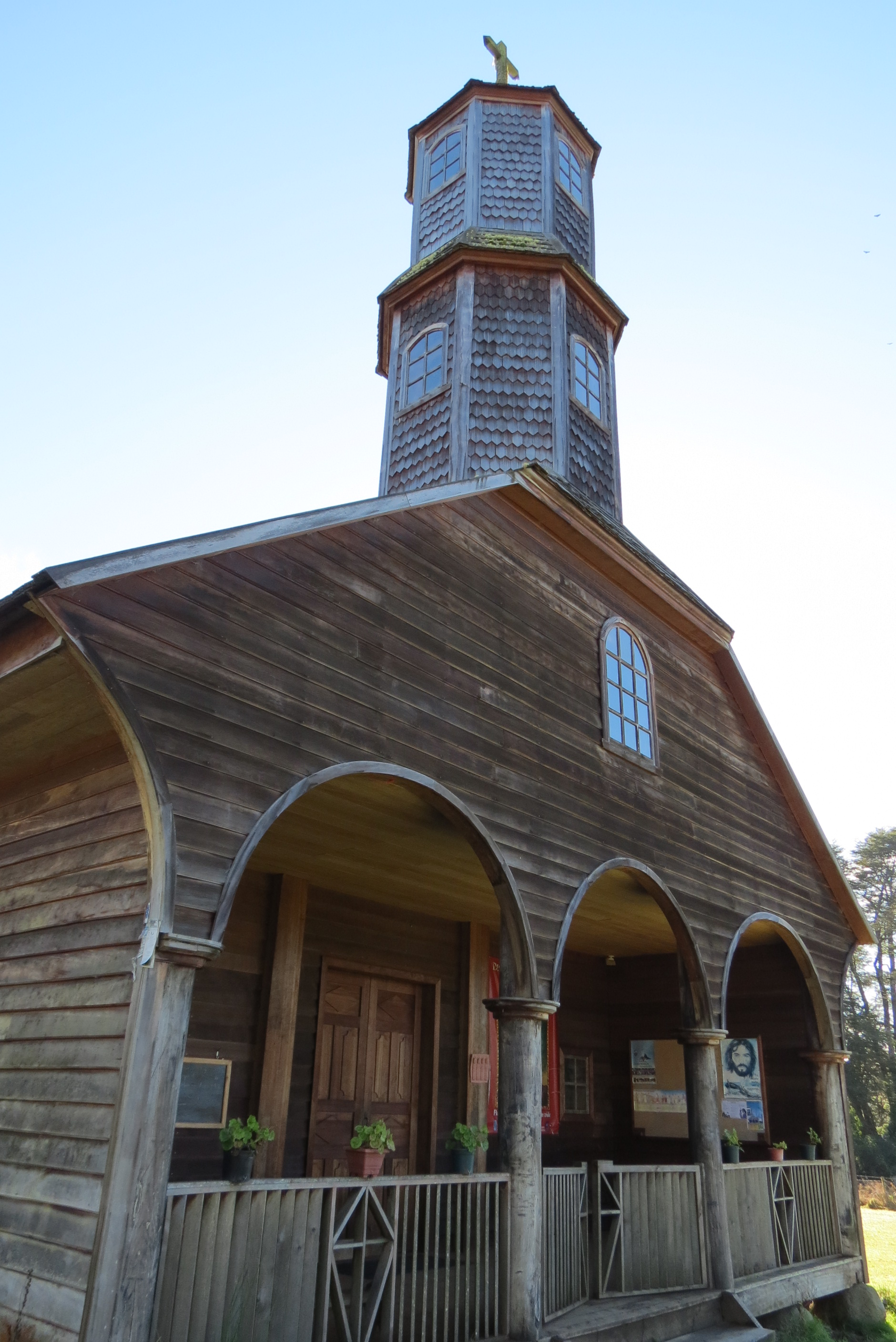

== See also ==
- Churches of Chiloé
