= History of Chiloé =

The history of Chiloé, an archipelago in Chile's south, has been marked by its geographic and political isolation. The archipelago has been described by Renato Cárdenas, historian at the Chilean National Library, as “a distinct enclave, linked more to the sea than the continent, a fragile society with a strong sense of solidarity and a deep territorial attachment.”

== First inhabitants ==
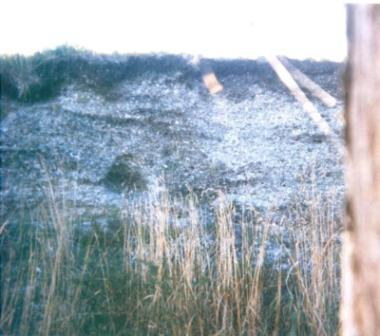
4m-deep midden on the coast of Nercón, Fjord of Castro.

The first human settlers arrived more than 7,000 years ago. Spread along the coast of Chiloé Island are a number of middens - ancient dumps for domestic waste, containing mollusc shells, stone tools and bonfire remains. Occasionally skeletons of marine birds have been found and in some cases, human skeletons. All of these remains indicate the presence of nomadic groups dedicated to the collection of marine creatures (clams, mussels and choromytilus chorus, among others) and to hunting and fishing. Among remains found on these sites are chopping tools, lithic flakes, hand axes as well as some objects made of bone. The older middens have been dated to 5,900BC and some of these remain in use, as the local communities use them as modern rubbish dumps.

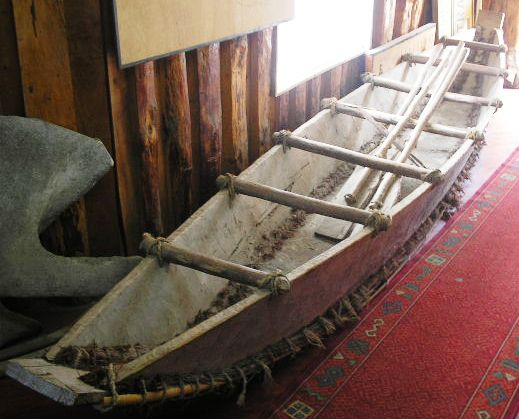
Reconstruction of a dalca in the museum of Dalcahue.

When the Spanish conquistadors arrived in the 16th century, the island was inhabited by the Chono, Huilliche and Cunco peoples. They navigated the treacherous waters of the archipelago in boats called dalcas with a skill that impressed the Spaniards.

== Spanish conquest and colonization ==
The first Spaniard to sight the coast of Chiloé was the explorer Alonso de Camargo in 1540, as he was travelling to Peru. However, in an expedition ordered by Pedro de Valdivia, captain Francisco de Ulloa reached the Chacao Channel in 1553 and explored the islands forming the archipelago, and is thus considered the first discoverer of Chiloé. In 1558, Spanish soldier García Hurtado de Mendoza began an expedition which would culminate in the Chiloé archipelago being claimed for the Spanish crown.

The city of Castro was founded of 1567. The island was originally called New Galicia by the Spanish discoverers, but this name did not stick and the name Chiloé, meaning “place of seagulls” in the Huilliche language, was given to the island.

In 1600 the Dutch corsair Baltazar de Cordes occupied Castro, but the Spaniards recaptured the city. In 1643, a Dutch expedition to Valdivia, led by Hendrik Brouwer, attacked and occupied Chiloé.

Jesuit missionaries to Chiloé Island, charged with the evangelization of the local population arrived on Chiloé at the turn of the 17th century and built a number of chapels throughout the archipelago. By 1767 there were already 79 and today more than 150 wooden churches built in traditional style can be found on the islands, many of these declared World Heritage Sites by UNESCO. Following the expulsion of the Jesuits in 1767, the Franciscans assumed responsibility for the religious mission to Chiloé from 1771.

== Independence and Republican period ==
Due to its direct dependence on the Viceroyalty of Peru, the process of independence in Chile went unnoticed in Chiloé and in fact, it was one of the last Spanish strongholds in South America. Chiloé only became part of the Chilean republic in 1826, eight years after independence and following the two failed campaigns for independence in 1820 and 1824. From 1843, a large number of Chilotes (as inhabitants of the island are called) migrated to Patagonia in search of work, mainly in Punta Arenas, but as living and working conditions in Chiloé improved in the following century this migration began gradually to decrease.

In the 19th century, Chiloé was a center for foreign whalers, particularly French whalers. From the middle of the 19th century and until the beginning of the 20th century, Chiloé was the main producer of railroad ties for the whole continent. From this point on, new towns dedicated to this industry were formed, including Quellón, Dalcahue, Chonchi and Quemchi. From 1895, lands were given to European settlers and also to large manufacturing industries.

With the rise of farming, inland areas of Chiloé Island began to be occupied; previously only the coastline had been inhabited. In 1912, the occupation of inland zones was completed with the construction of the railroad between Ancud and Castro. This railroad is no longer in service.

== Recent history ==
In the final decades of the 20th century, Chiloé underwent significant changes as its ocean resources were opened up to fishing and aquaculture companies and its economy shifted from one based on subsistence fishing, farming, and reciprocity to one of wage labor and market exchange. New aquaculture ventures, such as salmon farming, brought new, low-paying jobs for Chilotes. But the shift to wage labor pulled islanders away from their traditional livelihoods and collective labor practices like the minga that had formed a centerpiece of islander identity for generations.

A project to build a bridge from Chiloé Island to the mainland of Chile was initially proposed in 1972 and was eventually launched under the government of Ricardo Lagos (2000–2006) who launched the project as part of works to celebrate the Bicentennial of Chile. In 2006, however, the Chacao Channel bridge project was cancelled by the Ministry of Public Works after concerns about its total cost, which was estimated to be higher than the initial budget for the project. In May 2012, President Sebastián Piñera again revived the project, announcing an international bidding process would be opened to present the best solution for the construction of the bridge, with a US$740 million investment limit.

In late 2012, LAN Airlines became the first airline to offer flights to Chiloé Island, inaugurating a regular service between Puerto Montt and the airport of Mocopulli, Dalcahue.

== See also ==
- Chiloé Island
- Chiloé Archipelago
- Churches of Chiloé
