= Churches of Chiloé =

UNESCO World Heritage Site
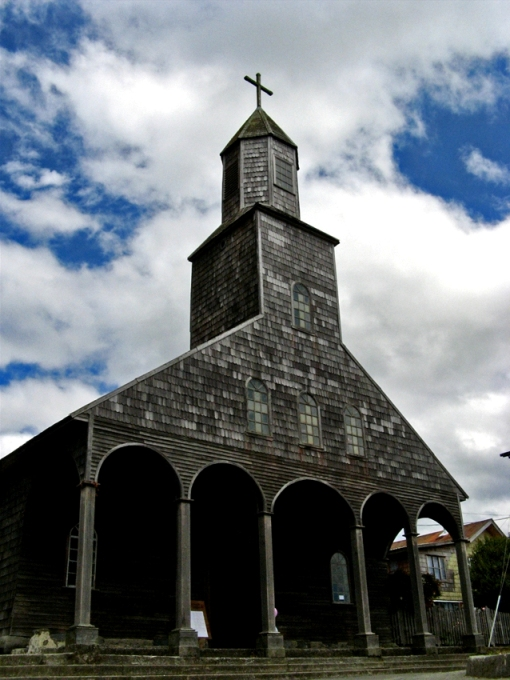
- Saint Mary Church (Iglesia Santa María) in Achao

- Location within Chile
- Location: Chiloé Archipelago, Chile
- Includes: Church of Santa María de Loreto, Achao; Church of Quinchao; Church of San Francisco, Castro; Church of Rilán; Church of Nercón; Church of Aldachildo; Church of Ichuac; Church of Detif; Church of Vilupulli; Church of Chonchi; Church of Tenaún; Church of Colo; Church of San Juan Bautista, Dalcahue; Church of Our Lady of Sorrows, Dalcahue; Church of Chelín; Church of Caguach
- Criteria: Cultural: ii, iii
- Reference: 971
- Inscription: 2000 (24th Session)
- Coordinates: 42°30′0″S 73°46′0″W

The Churches of Chiloé in Chile's Chiloé Archipelago are a unique architectural phenomenon in the Americas and one of the most prominent styles of Chilotan architecture. Unlike classical Spanish colonial architecture, the churches of Chiloé are made entirely in native timber with extensive use of wood shingles. The churches were built from materials to resist the Chiloé Archipelago's humid and rainy oceanic climate.

Built in the 18th and 19th centuries when Chiloé Archipelago was still a part of the Spanish Crown possessions, the churches represent the fusion of Spanish Jesuit culture and local native population's skill and traditions; an example of mestizo culture.

The Churches of Chiloé were designated UNESCO World Heritage Sites in 2000. The University of Chile, Fundación Cultural Iglesias de Chiloé and other institutions have led efforts to preserve these historic structures and to publicize them for their unique qualities.

== Location ==
The sixteen churches registered as part of the World Heritage Site are concentrated in the central eastern zone of the archipelago.

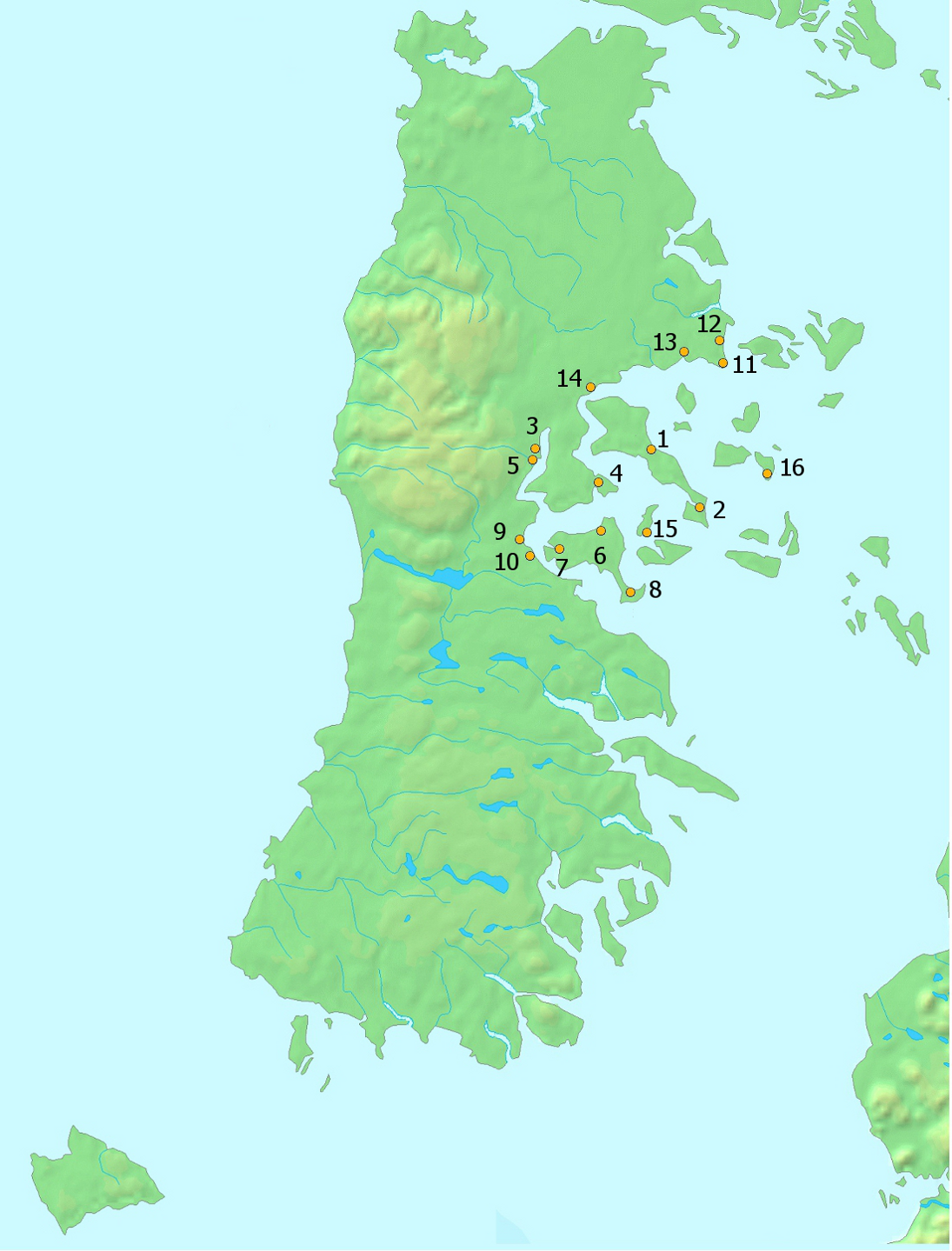

Code	Name	Commune	Photo
971-001	Church of Achao	Quinchao	
971-002	Church of Quinchao	Quinchao	
971-003	Church of San Francisco	Castro	
971-004	Church of Rilán	Castro	
971-005	Church of Nercón	Castro	
971-006	Church of Aldachildo	Puqueldón	
971-007	Church of Ichuac	Puqueldón	
971-008	Church of Detif	Puqueldón	
971-009	Church of Vilupulli	Chonchi	
971-010	Church of Chonchi	Chonchi	
971-011	Church of Tenaún	Dalcahue	
971-012	Church of Colo	Quemchi	
971-013	San Juan Bautista	Dalcahue	
971-014	Our Lady of Sorrows	Dalcahue	
971-015	Church of Chelín	Castro	
971-016	Church of Caguach	Quinchao	

== See also ==
- History of Chiloé
- Chilotan architecture
