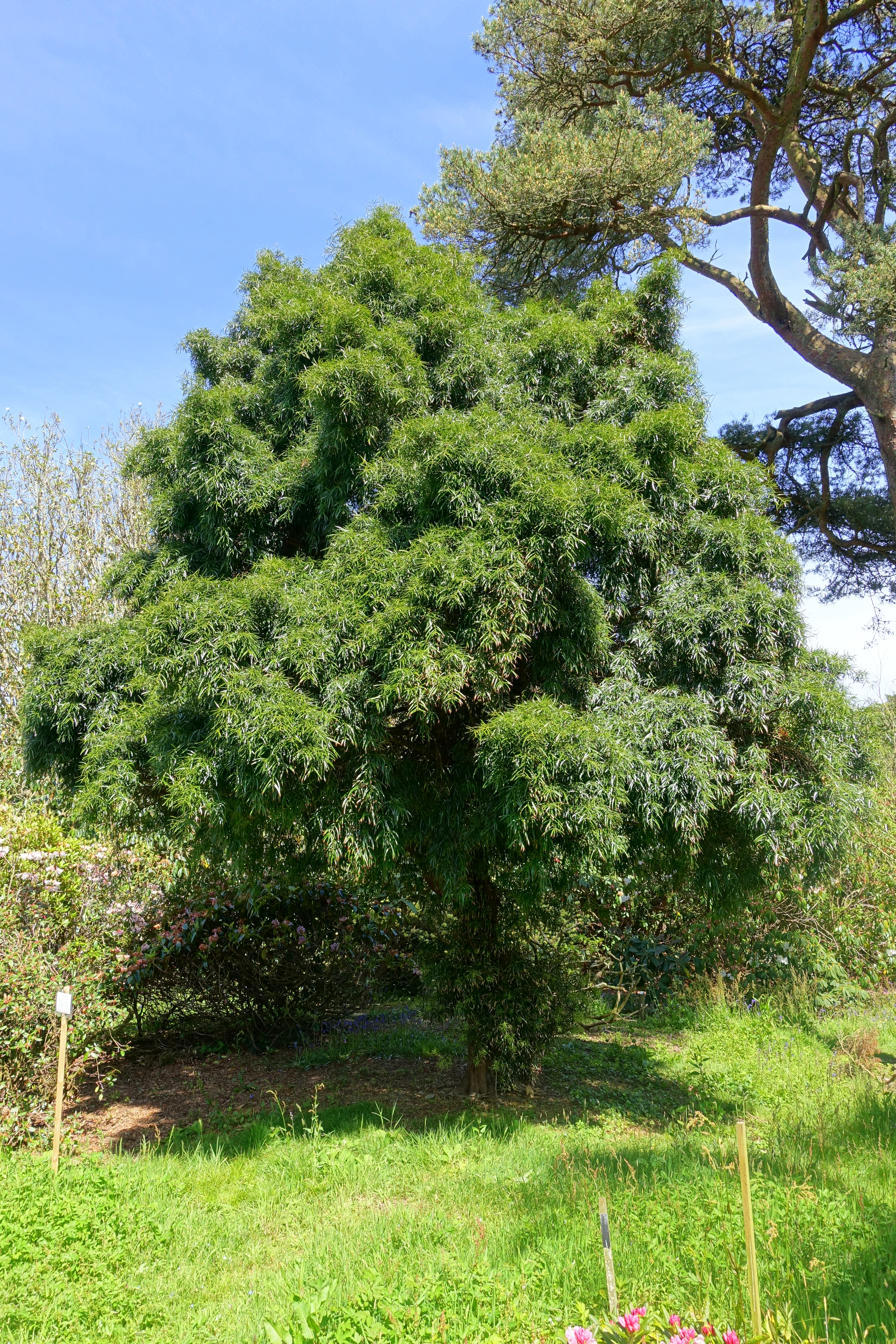

Conservation status
- Vulnerable (IUCN 3.1)

Scientific classification
- Kingdom: Plantae
- Clade: Tracheophytes
- Clade: Gymnosperms
- Division: Pinophyta
- Class: Pinopsida
- Order: Araucariales
- Family: Podocarpaceae
- Genus: Podocarpus
- Species: P. salignus

Binomial name
- Podocarpus salignus D.Don

= Podocarpus salignus =

Species of conifer

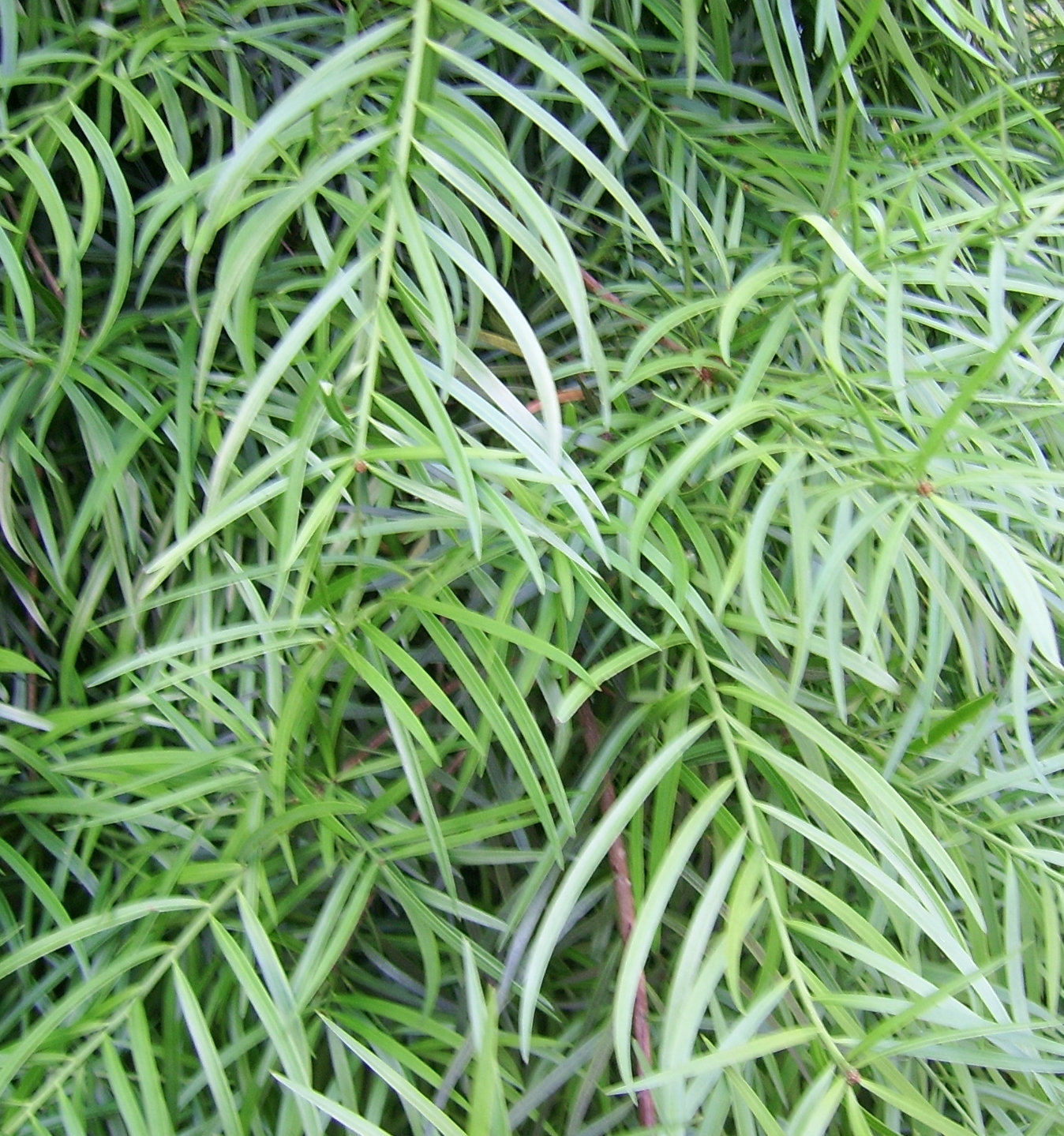
Leaves

Podocarpus salignus, the willow-leaf podocarp, is a species of conifer in the family Podocarpaceae. It is endemic to Chile from 35–42° S, where it is threatened by habitat loss. In Chile it is known as Mañío de hojas largas (long-leaved).

== Description ==
Podocarpus salignus is a species of coniferous tree that reaches up to 20 m (66 ft) in height and 1 m (3 ft) in diameter, the trunk is straight and cylindrical, with reddish-gray bark. The arching branches bear long, narrow, willow-like leaves, and red fleshy oval fruits where male and female plants are grown together.

== Cultivation and uses ==
This tree is grown in gardens and parks of Chile, and has been introduced to the British Isles. It requires heavy rainfalls or high humidity, but withstands temperatures down to −25 °C (−13 °F). It has gained the Royal Horticultural Society's Award of Garden Merit.

The wood is of good quality, yellowish colored, straight grained, and highly moisture resistant. It is used in furniture and construction.

== Other sources ==
- Donoso, C. 2005. Árboles nativos de Chile. Guía de reconocimiento. Edición 4. Marisa Cuneo Ediciones, Valdivia, Chile. 136p.
- Hechenleitner, P., M. Gardner, P. Thomas, C. Echeverría, B. Escobar, P. Brownless y C. Martínez. 2005. Plantas Amenazadas del Centro-Sur de Chile. Distribución, Conservación y Propagación. Universidad Austral de Chile y Real Jardín Botánico de Edimburgo, Valdivia. 188p.
- Hoffman, Adriana 1982. Flora silvestre de Chile, Zona Araucana. Edición 4. Fundación Claudio Gay, Santiago. 258p.
- Rodríguez, R. y M. Quezada. 1995. Gymnospermae. En C. Marticorena y R. Rodríguez [eds.], Flora de Chile Vol. 1, p 310–337. Universidad de Concepción, Concepción.
- Bean. W. Trees and Shrubs Hardy in Great Britain. Vol 1 - 4 and Supplement. Murray 1981.
- Usher. G. A Dictionary of Plants Used by Man. Constable 1974 ISBN 0-09-457920-2.
- F. Chittendon. RHS Dictionary of Plants plus Supplement. 1956 Oxford University Press 1951.
- Huxley. A. The New RHS Dictionary of Gardening. 1992. MacMillan Press 1992 ISBN 0-333-47494-5
