= Roman Catholic Diocese of San Carlos de Ancud =

Roman Catholic diocese in Chile

Coordinates: 41.8688°S 73.8291°W

Diocese of San Carlos de Ancud Dioecesis Sancti Caroli Anduciae Diócesis de San Carlos de Ancud

Catholic

Location
- Country: Chile
- Ecclesiastical province: Puerto Montt
- Metropolitan: Puerto Montt

Statistics
- Area: 24,483 km^{2} (9,453 sq mi)
- Population: Total; Catholics: (as of 2010); 171,000; 139,000 (81.3%)

Information
- Rite: Latin Rite
- Established: 1 July 1840 (186 years ago)
- Cathedral: Cathedral of the Tabernacle in Ancud
- Patron saint: St Charles Borromeo

Current leadership
- Pope: Leo XIV
- Bishop: Juan Maria Florindo Agurto Muñoz
- Metropolitan Archbishop: Cristián Caro Cordero
- Bishops emeritus: Juan Luis Ysern de Arce

Website
- www.obispadodeancud.cl

The Roman Catholic Diocese of San Carlos de Ancud (in Latin: Dioecesis Sancti Caroli Anduciae) is a suffragan diocese of the archdiocese of Puerto Montt, in Chile. Bishop Mgr. Juan María Florindo Agurto Muñoz succeeded the retired (emeritus) bishop Mgr. Juan Luis Ysern de Arce in 2005.

== History ==
The diocese is one of the oldest catholic dioceses in Chile. It was established by Pope Gregory XVI, by means of the Bulla "Ubi Primum" on 1 July 1840. The current Chilean dioceses of Villarrica, Valdivia, Osorno, Puerto Montt, Punta Arenas and the Apostolic Vicariate of Aysén have all been carved out of the original territory of the diocese of San Carlos de Ancud, at different times.

== Diocesan statistics ==
The diocese, which comprises the provinces of Chiloé and Palena, in the Los Lagos region of Chile, covers a territory of 24,283 km^{2} and has 26 parishes. Its estimated catholic population is about 117,000 out of a total population of 152,000. The diocesan cathedral ("El Sagrario" parish), is located in the city of Ancud.

== Bishops ==
=== Bishops of San Carlos de Ancud ===
- Justo Donoso Vivanco † (3 July 1848 – 19 March 1853 appointed bishop of La Serena)
- Vicente Gabriel Tocornal Velasco † (10 March 1853 – 11 November 1857, died)
- Juan Francisco de Paula Solar Mery † (20 March 1857 – 21 April 1882, died)
- Agustín Lucero Lazcano † (11 December 1886 – 3 December 1897, died)
- Ramón Angel Jara Ruz † (28 April 1898 – 31 August 1909 appointed bishop of La Serena)
- Pedro Armengol Valenzuela Poblete † (30 June 1910 – 16 December 1916, resigned)
- Luis Antonio Castro Alvarez † (21 February 1918 – 23 October 1924, resigned)
- Abraham Aguilera Bravo † (24 October 1924 – 30 April 1933, died)
- Ramón Munita Eyzaguirre † (22 January 1934 – 29 April 1939 appointed bishop of Puerto Montt)
- Hernán Frías Hurtado † (28 March 1940 – 13 January 1945 appointed bishop of Antofagasta)
- Cándido Rada Senosiáin † (9 June 1945 – 22 December 1949, resigned)
- Osvaldo Salinas Fuenzalida † (3 August 1950 – 15 June 1958 appointed bishop of Linares)
- Alejandro Durán Moreira † (17 April 1959 – 31 March 1966 appointed bishop of Los Angeles)
- Sergio Otoniel Contreras Navia † (21 November 1966 – 25 January 1974 appointed auxiliary bishop of Concepción)
- Juan Luis Ysern de Arce (13 May 1974 – 15 September 2005, retired)
- Juan Maria Florindo Agurto Muñoz (15 September 2005 succeeded – )

=== Coadjutor bishop ===
- Juan Maria Florindo Agurto Muñoz, O.S.M. (2001-2005)

=== Auxiliary bishop ===
- Augusto Klinke Leier (1908-1910), appointed Apostolic Administrator of Valdivia

=== Other priest of this diocese who became bishop ===
- Teodoro Bernardo Eugenín Barrientos (priest here, 1910-1927), appointed Apostolic Administrator of Valdivia

== Parishes ==
- El Sagrario, (Cathedral) Ancud
- San Antonio, Chacao
- San Ramón, Nal
- Nuestra Señora del Tránsito, Lliuco
- Patrocinio San José, Quemchi
- Santa María de Loreto, Achao
- Apóstol Santiago, Castro
- Sagrado Corazón, Castro
- San Judas, Curaco de Vélez
- Santos Reyes, Chaulinec
- Nuestra Señora del Rosario, Chelín
- Nuestra Señora de Lourdes, Dalcahue
- San Francisco Javier, Mechuque
- Corazón de María, Quilquico
- Natividad de María, Rilán
- Patrocinio San José, Tenaún
- Nuestra Señora de los Dolores, Volgue
- Nuestra Señora del Perpetuo Socorro, Quenac
- San Carlos, Chonchi
- San Pedro Nolasco, Puqueldón
- Nuestra Señora del Tránsito, Queilén
- San Antonio, Quellón
- San Juan Bautista, Rauco
- Nuestra Señora de los Dolores, Chaitén
