= Chiloé Province =

Province of Chile

Chiloé Province Provincia de Chiloé
- Province
- Seal

- Location in the Los Lagos Region
- Coordinates: 42°30′S 74°00′W
- Country: Chile
- Region: Los Lagos
- Capital: Castro
- Communes: List of 10: Ancud; Castro; Chonchi; Curaco de Vélez; Dalcahue; Puqueldón; Queilén; Quellón; Quemchi; Quinchao

Government
  - Type: Provincial
  - Governor: Fernando Bórquez (RN)

Area
  - Total: 7,165.5 km^{2} (2,766.6 sq mi)

Population (2012 Census)
  - Total: 161,654
  - Density: 22.560/km^{2} (58.430/sq mi)
  - Urban: 82,058
  - Rural: 60,136

Sex
  - Men: 71,386
  - Women: 70,808
- Time zone: UTC-4 (CLT)
  - Summer (DST): UTC-3 (CLST)
- Area code: +56-65
- Website: www.gobernacionchiloe.gov.cl

Chiloé Province (Spanish: Provincia de Chiloé) is one of the four provinces in the southern Chilean region of Los Lagos (X). It consists of all of Chiloé Archipelago (including Chiloé Island) with the exception of the Desertores Islands. The province spans a surface area of 9,181.6 km^{2} (3,545 sq mi). Its capital is Castro, and the seat of the Roman Catholic bishopric is Ancud.

== Administration ==
As a province, Chiloé is a second-level administrative division of Chile, governed by a provincial governor who is appointed by the president.

=== Communes ===
Communes of Los Lagos Region. Provinces are shown in colours.

The province is composed of ten communes, each governed by a municipality consisting of an alcalde and municipal council.

Commune	Seal	Population (2017)
1. Ancud		38 991
2. Castro		43 807
3. Chonchi		14 858
4. Curaco de Vélez		3 829
5. Dalcahue		13 762
6. Puqueldón		3 921
7. Queilén		5 385
8. Quemchi		8 352
9. Quellón		27 192
10. Quinchao		8 088

== Geography and demography ==
According to the 2002 census by the National Statistics Institute (INE), the province spans an area of 7,165.5 km^{2} (2,767 sq mi) and had a population of 142,194 inhabitants (71,386 men and 70,808 women), giving it a population density of 19.8/km^{2} (51/sq mi). Of these, 82,058 (57.7%) lived in urban areas and 60,136 (42.3%) in rural areas. Between the 1992 and 2002 censuses, the population grew by 9.1% (11,805 persons). Chiloé Province's population increased to 174,034 in 2012 and to 178,342 in 2017, while the official estimate as at mid 2023 was 183,347.

== See also ==
- Patagonia
