= Pillán Airport =

- IATA: none; ICAO: SCPN

Summary
- Airport type: Private
- Serves: Chaitén, Chile
- Location: Pillán
- Elevation AMSL: 33 ft / 10 m
- Coordinates: 42°32′50″S 72°29′42″W

Map
- Location of Pillán Airport in Chile

Runways
Direction	Length		Surface
Direction	m	ft	Surface
01/19	380	1,247	Grass
- Source: Landings.com Google Maps GCM

Pillán Airport Spanish: Aeropuerto de Pillán, (ICAO: SCPN) is an airport at the southern end of an isthmus valley connecting the heads of the Reñihué and Comau Fjords in the Los Lagos Region of Chile. The valley separates the Huequi Peninsula from mainland Chile. Pillán is 45 kilometres (28 mi) northeast of the town of Chaitén.

The airport is adjacent to the shore of Reñihue Fjord, with southbound approach and departure routes taking place over the water. The valley is narrow, surrounded by mountainous terrain in all directions.

The Chaiten VOR-DME (Ident: TEN) is 21.0 nautical miles (38.9 km) southwest of the airport.

== See also ==
- Transport in Chile
- List of airports in Chile
