= Corcovado (disambiguation) =

Corcovado is a mountain in central Rio de Janeiro.

Corcovado may also refer to:

== Geography ==
Argentina

- Corcovado, Chubut, a locality in Argentina
- Corcovado River, a river which originates in Argentina, with its mouth in Chile

Brazil

- Corcovado Rack Railway

Chile

- Corcovado National Park (Chile)
- Corcovado Volcano, a mountain in Chile
- Corcovado River, a river which originates in Argentina, with its mouth in Chile
- Corcovado Gulf

Costa Rica

- Corcovado National Park (Costa Rica)

Puerto Rico

- Corcovada, Añasco, Puerto Rico, a barrio in Añasco, a municipality of Puerto Rico (U.S.)

== Other ==
- Corcovado (song), by Antonio Carlos Jobim
- El Corcovado, a literary work by Ermilo Abreu Gómez
- Corcovado (beetle), a genus of longhorn beetles in the family Cerambycidae
