= Vodudahue Airport =

- IATA: none; ICAO: SCDH

Summary
- Airport type: Private
- Serves: Chaitén, Chile
- Elevation AMSL: 98 ft / 30 m
- Coordinates: 42°29′20″S 72°21′05″W

Map
- Location of Vodudahue Airport in Chile

Runways
Direction	Length		Surface
Direction	m	ft	Surface
09/27	747	2,451	Grass
- Source: Landings.com Google Maps GCM

Vodudahue Airport Spanish: Aeropuerto Vodudahue, (ICAO: SCDH) is an airstrip 56 kilometres (35 mi) northeast of Chaitén, a town in the Los Lagos Region of Chile. The airstrip is in the valley of the Vodudahue River, 5 kilometres (3.1 mi) east of where the river empties into the Comau Fjord. The valley extends eastward into Pumalín Park.

There is nearby mountainous terrain north and south of the airstrip, and distant mountainous terrain to the east. The west quadrant opens into the fjord.

The Chaiten VOR-DME (Ident: TEN) is 28.1 nautical miles (52.0 km) southwest of the airport.

== See also ==
- Transport in Chile
- List of airports in Chile
