= Reñihúe Airport =

- IATA: none; ICAO: SCRH

Summary
- Airport type: Private
- Serves: Chaitén
- Location: Reñihúe
- Elevation AMSL: 16 ft / 5 m
- Coordinates: 42°35′10″S 72°29′44″W

Map
- Location of Reñihúe Airport in Chile

Runways
Direction	Length		Surface
Direction	m	ft	Surface
16/34	500	1,640	Grass
- Source: Landings.com Google Maps GCM

Reñihúe Airport (Spanish: Aeropuerto de Reñihúe, (ICAO: SCRH)) is an airport serving the hamlet of Reñihúe, 41 kilometres (25 mi) north-northeast of Chaitén, a city in the Los Lagos Region of Chile. Reñihué is at the eastern end of Reñihué Fjord, which opens into the Gulf of Ancud.

There is mountainous terrain in all quadrants except approaches to the airport along the fjord or along the Reñihué River valley.

The Chaiten VOR-DME (Ident: TEN) is 19.5 nautical miles (36.1 km) southwest of the airport.

== See also ==
- Transport in Chile
- List of airports in Chile
