= Huequi =

Mountain in Chile

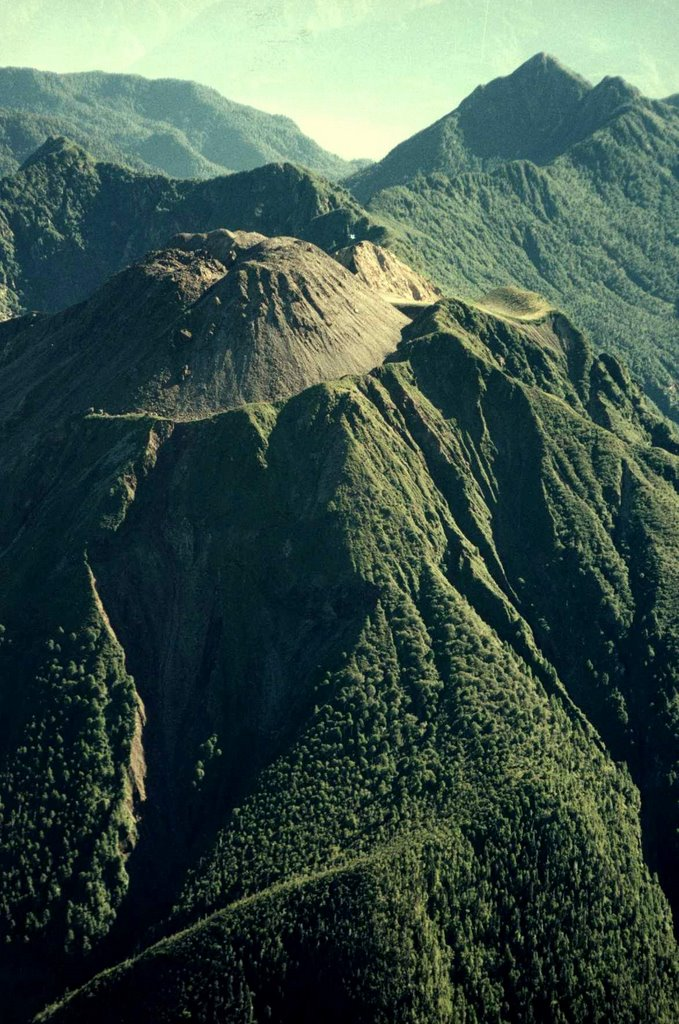

Highest point
- Elevation: 1,318 m (4,324 ft)
- Coordinates: 42°22′24″S 72°34′48″W

Geography
- Location within Chile
- Location: Chile
- Parent range: Andes

Geology
- Mountain type: Lava domes
- Last eruption: 1920 (?)

Huequi (Spanish pronunciation: [weki]) is a volcano in the Los Lagos Region of Chile. It is in the Southern Volcanic Zone, in the centre of Ayacara Peninsula and close to the Gulf of Ancud. It is made up of a lava dome complex situated in a depression of unclear origin, a postglacial lava dome Calle and a Pleistocene volcano with Holocene parasitic cones, with a sharp summit at 1,318 metres (4,324 ft). There were reports of eruptions 1890–1920, and it is said to have "smoked" in 1935.

== Geography and geology ==
The volcano is also known as Hueque, Relibuentu and Huequen. It is in a remote region of southern Chile with no road access. There are only a few villages along the coast, and little human modification of the environment.

Huequi lies roughly at the centre of the Ayacara Peninsula east of the Gulf of Ancud. Huequi is part of the Southern Volcanic Zone (SVZ), lying in its southern sector between the volcanoes Hornopiren and Chaiten-Minchinmavida; Chaiten erupted in 2008. Compared to other volcanoes in the SVZ it is small, rising only 400 metres (1,300 ft) from a curved depression to an elevation of 1,318 metres (4,324 ft), and it lacks glaciers. Huequi consists of a pile of lava domes that are heavily eroded and cut by sector collapses. A partially collapsed dome forms the summit. A summit crater was reported as "narrow" in 1909 and as 800 metres (2,600 ft) wide by the Global Volcanism Program. Debris avalanches, partly channelled by a northwestward trending valley in the edifice, have formed a fan on that side of Huequi. Pumice from the volcano has been carried to the sea by the Huequi River, which originates at the foot of Huequi. Two additional cones are named Porcelana and Barranes Colorado or Barranco Colorado; there is also the Calle postglacial lava dome. The Huequi volcano may be part of larger volcanic complexes that are now eroded. The basement is formed by faulted granite and metamorphic rocks of the North Patagonian Batholith.

The subduction of the Nazca Plate under the South American Plate gives rise to the volcanism of the Andes. In the southern sector between Yate and Cerro Hudson, where Huequi is located, the crust is thin and does not heavily influence the basaltic and basaltic andesite magmas. East of the volcano passes the Liquine-Ofqui Fault Zone in a fjord; the volcano lies on a separate, northwest-trending lineament.

=== Composition ===
Huequi has erupted andesite and basaltic andesite, which have grey and red colours and feature both layered and brecciated sequences. Dacite has also been reported. The volcanic rocks define a calc-alkaline suite that resembles the adakites of Nevado de Longavi. The main phenocryst phase is plagioclase, followed by orthopyroxene and hornblende. The lava domes contain columnar forms exposed in cliffs and dense porphyries. Compared to other volcanoes in this sector of the Southern Volcanic Zone, Huequi's magmas are water-rich. This may explain some peculiarities about its eruptive activity, as the water escapes from the magma and leaves a viscous andesite.

== Climate and vegetation ==
The region has a humid climate, with storm systems from the Pacific Ocean bringing about 2 m (79 in) or 3–3.2 m (120–130 in) of precipitation during autumn and winter. Mean annual temperatures are about 8 °C (46 °F). It is covered by the Valdivian rainforest, with Amomyrtus meli, Drimys winteri, Luma apiculata, Nothofagus nitida and Podocarpus as representative plant species.

== Eruption history ==
Southeast of Huequi lie three small volcanoes, which probably erupted during the Pleistocene. Porcelana is of Pleistocene age. During the Holocene, the volcano repeatedly produced lava domes that frequently collapsed, and explosive eruptions that deposited tephra. The debris avalanche deposits consist of older volcanic rocks, pumice and lithics from the basement. The collapses were not energetic, with most of the debris being confined by the surrounding topography; their heavy vegetation cover indicates that they are older than the most recent eruption. Tephra layers in Lago Futalaufquen have been correlated to an eruption in AD 1645–1745.

There are sparse reports of eruptions between 1890–1920, with reports from the years 1890–91, 1893–94, 1895–96, 1906, 1917, 1920, and 1922. The activity was visible from Chiloe and Puerto Montt. Some of this activity may relate to the 1906 Valparaíso earthquake. These eruptions reached a volcanic explosivity index of 2–3 and deposited patches of tephra to the north of the volcano. Contemporary records indicate that the 1890 eruption deposited ash from Chiloe into Argentina. The tephra consists of red and black scoria and pumice, formed presumably by Vulcanian eruptions. The summit dome may have formed during this sequence. The volcano was reportedly "smoking" in 1935.

Porcelana geyser and Porcelana hot spring lie on the Ayacara Peninsula and are associated with Huequi. The Porcelana geysers have produced pinnacles of travertine reaching heights of 2.5 metres (8 ft 2 in); this extreme size in a highly erosive environment may be due to microbial chemical processes. The area has good potential for geothermal energy.

== See also ==
- List of volcanoes in Chile
- Huinay
- Pumalín Park
- Chaitén
