= Caleta Gonzalo Airport =

Airport in Chile

- IATA: none; ICAO: SCGN

Summary
- Airport type: Private
- Serves: Chaitén, Chile
- Elevation AMSL: 33 ft / 10 m
- Coordinates: 42°33′50″S 72°35′57″W

Map
- Location of Caleta Gonzalo Airport in Chile

Runways
Direction	Length		Surface
Direction	m	ft	Surface
13/31	579	1,900	Grass
- Source: Landings.com Google Maps GCM

Caleta Gonzalo Airport (Spanish: Aeropuerto de Caleta Gonzalo, (ICAO: SCGN)) is an airstrip by a cove off the Reñihué Fjord in the Los Lagos Region of Chile. The airstrip is 42 kilometres (26 mi) north of Chaitén, the largest town in the area.

The cove is at the mouth of a narrow canyon running south toward the Chaitén Volcano. South approach and departures are hazardous due to close proximity of the canyon wall. North approach and departures are over open water.

The Chaiten VOR-DME (Ident: TEN) is 17.2 nautical miles (31.9 km) southwest of the airport.

== See also ==
- Transport in Chile
- List of airports in Chile
