= Los Alerces Airport =

- IATA: none; ICAO: SCLR

Summary
- Airport type: Private
- Serves: Chaitén, Chile
- Elevation AMSL: 345 ft / 105 m
- Coordinates: 42°46′51″S 72°38′40″W

Map
- Location of Los Alerces Airport in Chile

Runways
Direction	Length		Surface
Direction	m	ft	Surface
09/27	502	1,647	Grass
- Source: GCM Google Maps

Los Alerces Airport (ICAO: SCLR) is an airstrip 16 kilometres (9.9 mi) north-northeast of Chaitén, a coastal city in the Los Lagos Region of Chile. The airstrip is in an open mountain valley 6 kilometres (3.7 mi) north of the Chaitén volcano caldera.

The Chaiten VOR-DME (Ident: TEN) is 8.4 nautical miles (15.6 km) west of the airstrip.

There is mountainous terrain in all quadrants.

== See also ==
- Transport in Chile
- List of airports in Chile
