= Nuevo Chaitén Airport =

- IATA: WCH; ICAO: SCTN

Summary
- Airport type: Public
- Serves: Chaitén, Chile
- Elevation AMSL: 95 ft / 29 m
- Coordinates: 42°46′55″S 72°50′05″W

Map
- Location of Nuevo Chaitén Airport in Chile

Runways
Direction	Length		Surface
Direction	m	ft	Surface
01/19	1,200	3,937	Asphalt
- Source: SkyVector GCM

Nuevo Chaitén Airport Spanish: Aeródromo Nuevo Chaitén, (IATA: WCH, ICAO: SCTN) is an airport serving the town of Chaitén and other communities in northern Chilean Patagonia such as Palena and Futaleufú. The airport replaced Chaitén Airfield, which was damaged beyond repair after the 2008 eruption of the Chaitén Volcano. The new airport is 18 kilometres (11 mi) northwest of town. After construction began on Nuevo Chaitén Airport in 2013, it assumed the ICAO and IATA codes of the closed airport.

Two airlines, Aerocord and Pewen, fly daily scheduled service to La Paloma Airport in Puerto Montt. Private charters are also common. During the summer and early fall tourist season, Chaiten Airport receives up to 12 flights a day, mostly from Puerto Montt. In winter there are usually 4-6 flights a day.

== See also ==
- Transport in Chile
- List of airports in Chile
