= Corcovado Volcano =

Mountain in Chile

Corcovado
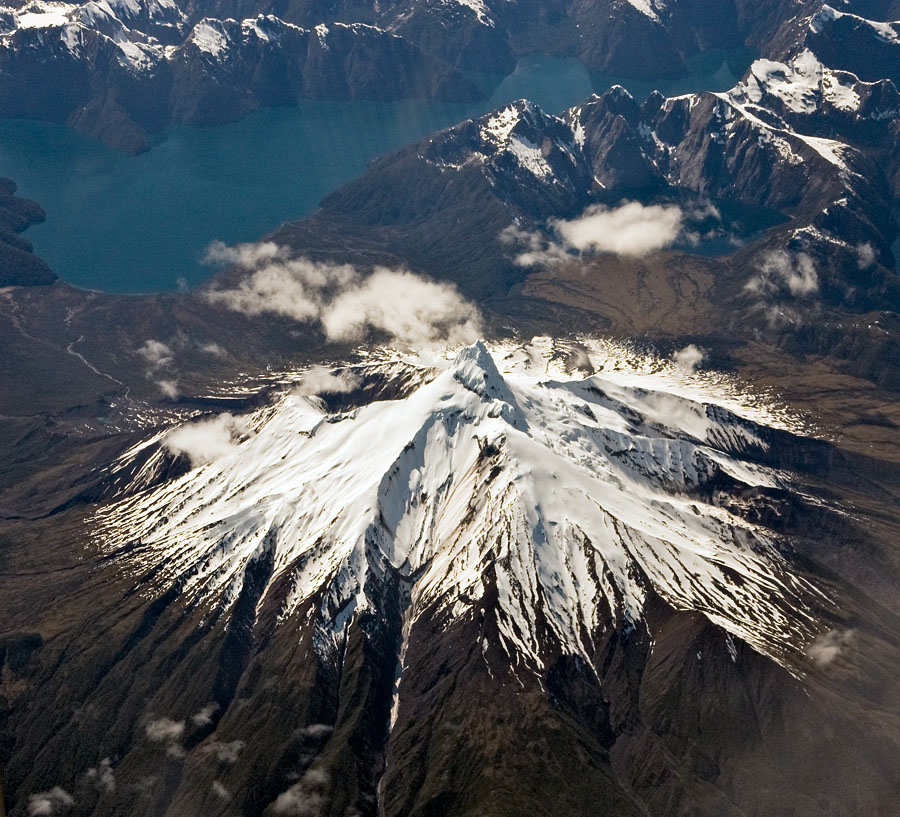
- The volcano seen from the west on a commercial flight.

Highest point
- Elevation: 2,300 m (7,500 ft)
- Coordinates: 43°11′S 72°48′W

Geography
- Location: Chile
- Parent range: Andes

Geology
- Mountain type: Stratovolcano
- Last eruption: 4920 BCE ± 100

Corcovado Volcano (Spanish pronunciation: [koɾkoˈβaðo]) is a stratovolcano located about 25 kilometres (16 mi) south of the mouth of the Yelcho River, in the Palena Province, Los Lagos Region, Chile. The glacially eroded volcano is flanked by Holocene cinder cones. The volcano's base has likely prehistoric lava flows that are densely vegetated. The most distinctive feature of this volcano is its stepped top, similar to that of Puntiagudo Volcano. At its foot lies a series of lakes. Corcovado dominates the landscape of the Gulf of Corcovado area and is visible from Chiloé Island, weather permitting.

The volcano and the adjacent area form part of Corcovado National Park. The town of Chaitén is the main gateway to this protected area. Much of the town was heavily damaged following an explosive eruption of Chaitén Volcano and the resultant lahars in 2008, but has since been rebuilt.

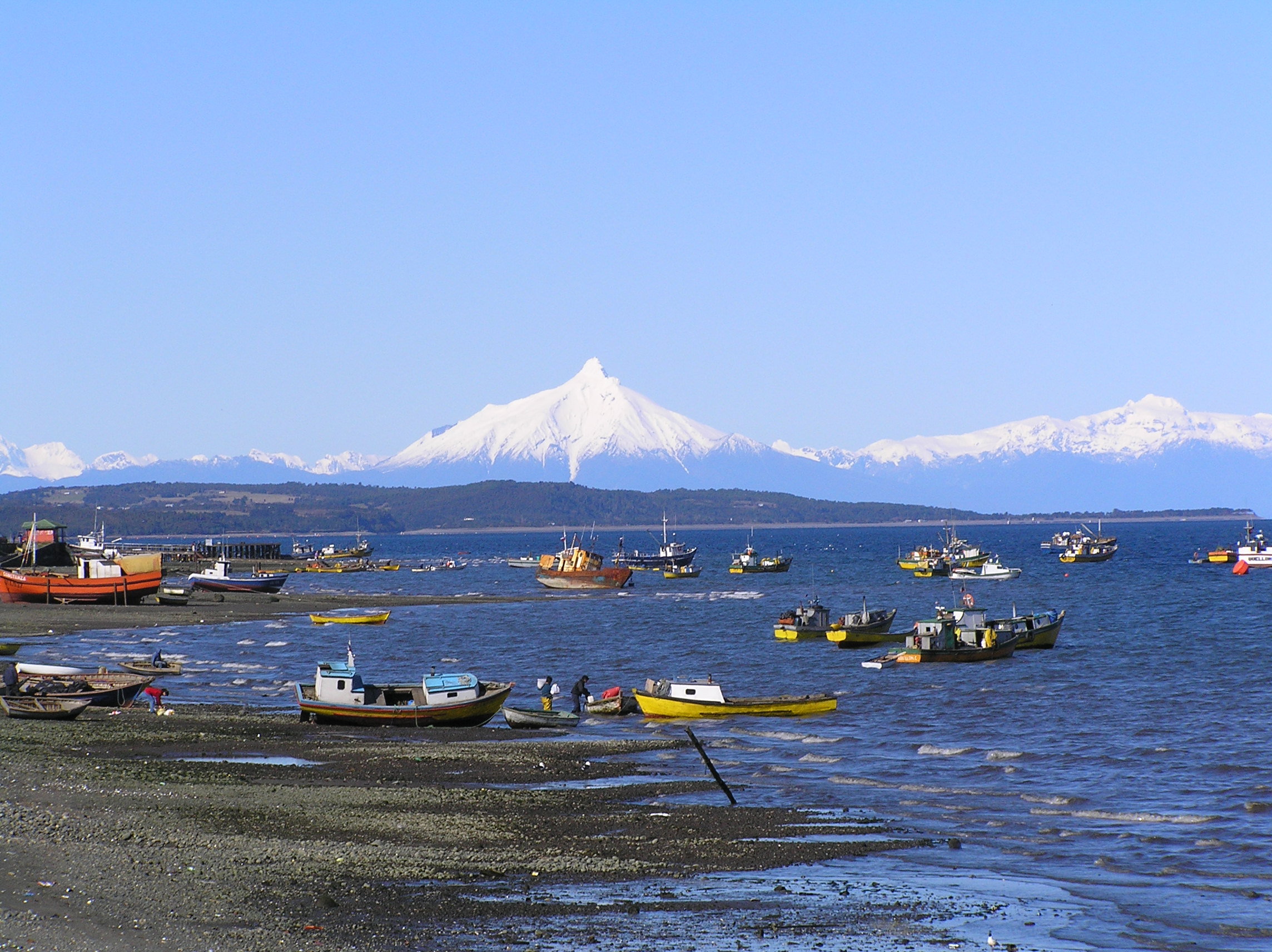
The volcano as seen from Quellón

== Eruptive history ==
Corcovado is reported to have erupted in 1834 and 1835, based on second-hand accounts collected by Charles Darwin. Darwin was passing nearby on HMS Beagle, when he experienced the great 1835 Concepción earthquake. Darwin gathered first-hand accounts of the phenomena that accompanied this earthquake, and published these in a paper in 1840. Among the accounts were suggestions that a number of volcanoes had burst into eruption, following the earthquake. From this, it has been suggested that Corcovado may have erupted, with lava flows from flank cones, but it is likely that these were based on confusion with Michinmahuida volcano.

Three tephra layers from major explosive eruptions of Holocene age are linked to Corcovado volcano, of which the two youngest are dated at 7,980 BP and 6,870 BP respectively.

== See also ==
- List of volcanoes in Chile
- Chaitén (volcano) - the volcano 40 km North of Corcovado which erupted on May 2, 2008.
- Yanteles - a little-known volcano located about 30 km (19 mi) south of Corcovado.
- 180 Degrees South: Conquerors of the Useless - a 2010 documentary directed by Chris Malloy that covers the journey of Jeff Johnson as he travels from Ventura, California to Patagonia, Chile to attempt to summit Corcovado.
