= Ayacara Peninsula =

Peninsula in Chile

Coordinates: 42.313205°S 72.651125°W

Ayacara Peninsula is a peninsula in northwestern Patagonia in Chile that protrudes to the northwest. The peninsula bounds to the southwest with Reñihué Fjord and to the northeast with Comau Fjord. The volcano Huequi lies in the central parts of the peninsula. Ayacara Formation crops out in parts of the peninsula.

The hamlets of Ayacara Norte and Buill Norte lies in the western coast of the peninsula.
