= Yanteles =

Mountain in Chile

- Yantales
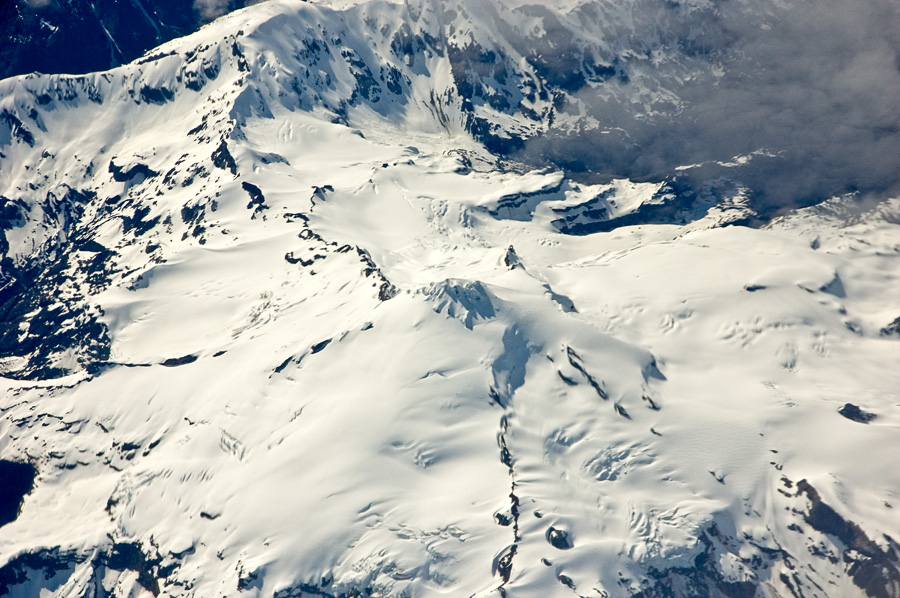
- Aerial view of one of the Yanteles volcano's major peaks

Highest point
- Coordinates: 43.469°S 72.782°W

Geography
- Location: Chile
- Parent range: Andes

Geology
- Mountain type: Stratovolcano
- Last eruption: 6650 BCE (?)

Yanteles is an isolated stratovolcano composed of five glacier-capped peaks along an 8 km-long NE-trending ridge. It is located approximately 30 km (19 mi) south of the Corcovado volcano in the Chilean X Region (de Los Lagos) within the Corcovado National Park. The name Yanteles can refer only to the main summit, which is also known as Volcán Nevado (Spanish for "Snow-covered Volcano").

== Geography and geology ==
The volcano lies in the Chaitén municipality, Palena region, Los Lagos Region of Chile. Villa Santa Lucía and Bahía Tic-Toc are the closest settlements to the volcano, while Chaitén is 60 kilometres (37 mi) away. The elongated edifice is 2,042 metres (6,699 ft), 1,790 metres (5,870 ft) or 1,971 metres (6,467 ft) high and covers an area of 84.5 square kilometres (32.6 sq mi), making it a large volcano. Three stratovolcanoes developed on a north-south trending fault and five peaks form a ridge trending northeastward. Volcanoes like Yanteles form the highest summits of the Andes at these latitudes. It also features a caldera with a pyroclastic cone. Eroded peaks occur in the vicinity and Nevado and Yeli are volcanic necks associated with the system. Another major fault in the region is the Melimoyu-Yanteles Fault.

It is covered by sizeable glaciers, which with an area of 46.24 square kilometres (17.85 sq mi) (As of 2007) form one of the largest areas of ice in the region. It has been declining at a rate of 0.72 square kilometres per year (0.28 mi^{2}/a).

Yanteles has erupted basaltic andesite. The volcano is geologically part of the Southern Volcanic Zone of the Andes.

== History and hazards ==
The volcano was active in the Pleistocene-Holocene and the last major eruption was 6,650 BCE. The volcano is considered to be a source of tephra layers such as the 7,240±150 BCE eruption that produced the YAN1 tephra.Another eruption took place 10,340±180 years before present. One tephra in the Siple Dome of Antarctica and tephras found in Patagonian lakes may come from Yanteles.

Yanteles is little known, but attested in a 1899 publication and was known to be a volcano as far back as 1916. The occurrence of historical eruptions is uncertain; Yanteles reportedly erupted a day after the 1835 Concepcion earthquake and activity continued for months, but little is known about this activity and its description as patches of bare rock or the disappearance of snow makes the record doubtful; such a change could constitute landsliding instead. Later activity is limited to fumarolic activity in 1982, 1992 and 1993-1995. Two fumarolic areas were reported in 1993 on the ridge, 2 kilometres (1.2 mi) from each other, and were emitting yellow-to-white steam.

Future eruptions could cause mudflows in the valleys around the volcano. It was classified as a type III volcano by SERNAGEOMIN, implying an intermediate volcanic hazard.

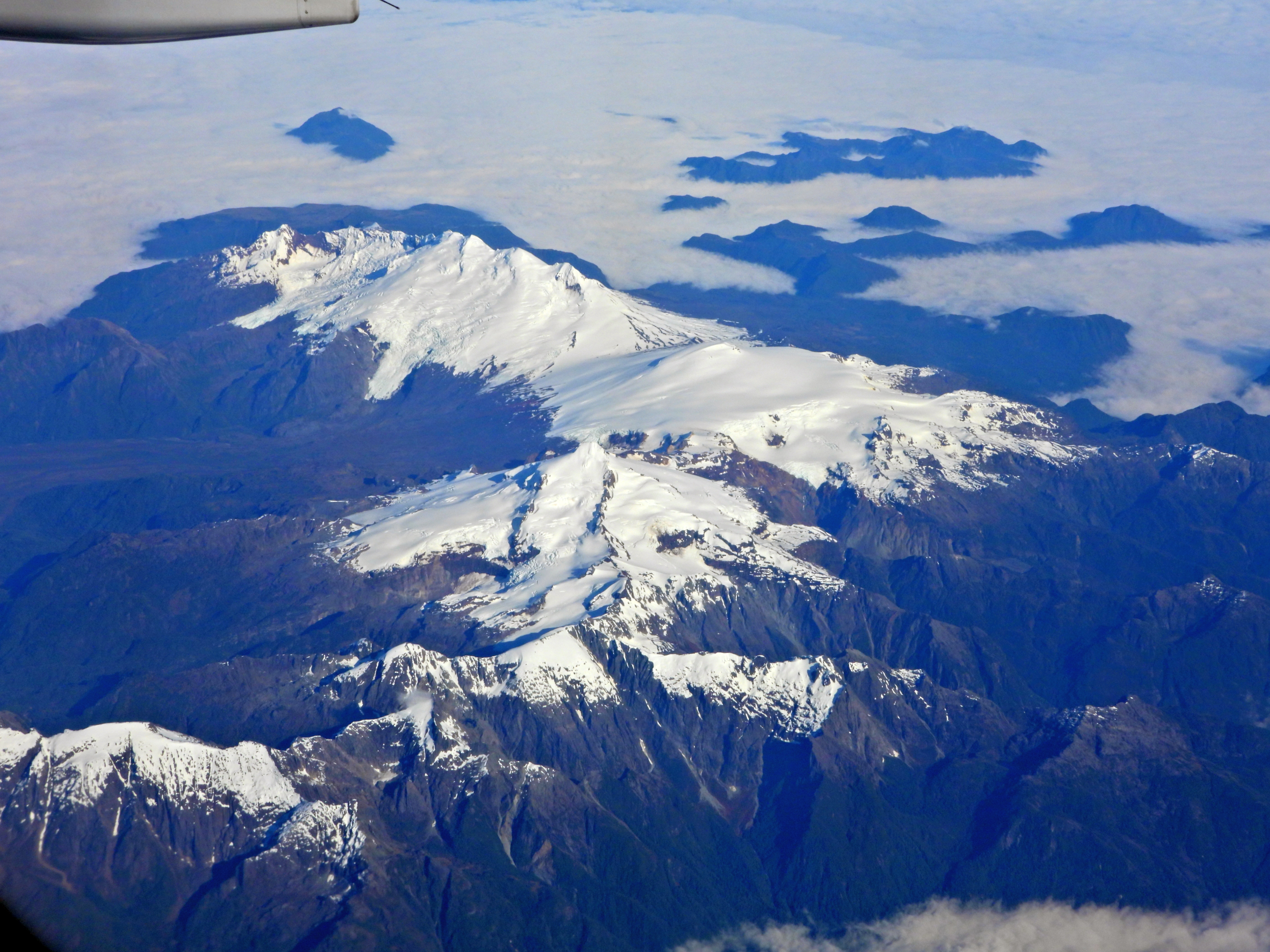

== See also ==
- List of volcanoes in Chile
- Corcovado volcano
