= Chaitén Airfield =

- IATA: ~~WCH~~; ICAO: ~~SCTN~~

Summary
- Airport type: Closed
- Serves: Chaitén, Chile
- Elevation AMSL: 13 ft / 4 m
- Coordinates: 42°55′58″S 72°41′58″W

Map
- Location of Chaitén Airfield in Chile

Runways
Direction	Length		Surface
Direction	ft	m	Surface
Closed
- Source: Google Maps

Chaitén Airfield (Spanish: Aeródromo Chaitén, (IATA: ~~WCH~~, ICAO: ~~SCTN~~)) was an airport serving Chaitén, a town in the Los Lagos Region of Chile. The airport was damaged and closed after the 2008 eruption of Chaitén Volcano.

A provisional airstrip was established 12 kilometres (7.5 mi) away at the hamlet of Santa Bárbara, by widening 700 metres (2,300 ft) of the Carretera Austral highway.

In 2013, construction began on Nuevo Chaitén Airport, which then assumed the ICAO and IATA codes of the closed airport. The new airport is 18 kilometres (11 mi) northwest of Chaitén.

== See also ==
- Transport in Chile
- List of airports in Chile
