= SCTN =

SCTN may refer to:

- Stop Child Trafficking Now, a nonprofit organization
- Chaitén Airfield (ICAO code: SCTN), a public-use airport in Chile
