= Corcovado peruviense =

Scientific classification
- Domain: Eukaryota
- Kingdom: Animalia
- Phylum: Arthropoda
- Class: Insecta
- Order: Coleoptera
- Suborder: Polyphaga
- Infraorder: Cucujiformia
- Family: Cerambycidae
- Tribe: Hemilophini
- Genus: Corcovado
- Species: C. peruviense

Binomial name
- Corcovado peruviense Lane, 1973

Species of beetle

Corcovado peruviense is a species of beetle in the family Cerambycidae. It was described by Lane in 1973. It is known from Peru.
