= Los Arrayanes National Park =

National park in Argentina

- Parque Nacional Los Arrayanes
- IUCN category II (national park)
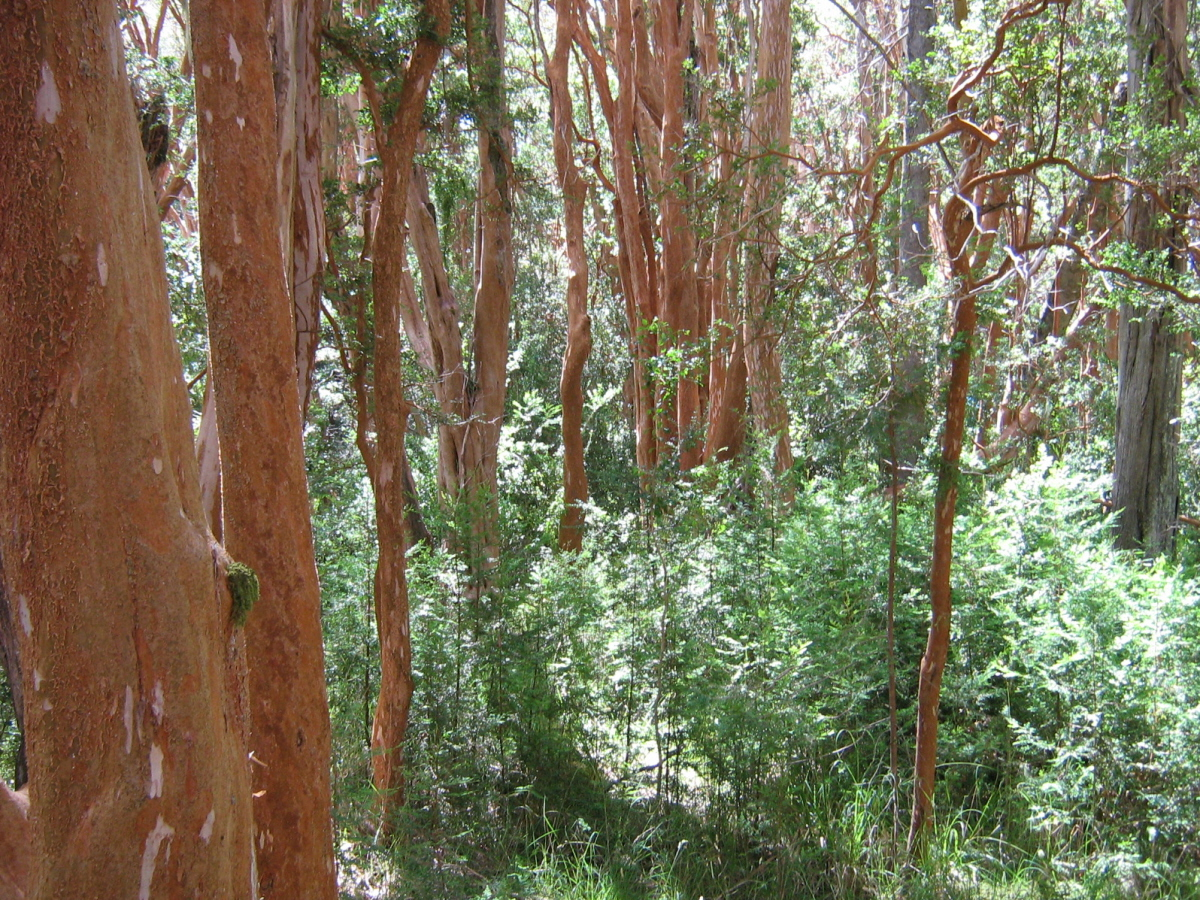
- The Arrayán forest, in Los Arrayanes National Park

- Location within Argentina
- Location: Neuquén Province, Argentina
- Nearest city: Villa La Angostura
- Coordinates: 40°50′S 71°37′W
- Area: 17.53 km^{2} (6.77 sq mi)
- Established: 1971
- Governing body: Administración de Parques Nacionales

Los Arrayanes National Park (Spanish: Parque Nacional Los Arrayanes) is a national park of Argentina with an area of 17.53 square kilometres (6.77 sq mi). It covers the Quetrihué Peninsula on the shore of the Nahuel Huapi Lake in the province of Neuquén, 3 km (1.9 mi) from Villa la Angostura.

Even though arrayán trees (Luma apiculata) can be seen on the way to the end of the peninsula, the forest of 300-year-old arrayanes covers 0.2 km^{2} (20 ha) of the southern point, with individuals of over 600 years. The forest can be reached by boat from different points of the Nahuel Huapi lake, or a 12 km (7.5 mi) path from the beginning of the park at the port of Villa La Angostura. This path, full of ups and downs, is also popularly done by mountain bike.

There are a few pudú and huemul deer, guanacos, monitos de monte, and small foxes. Among the birds, condors, eagles, hawks, and woodpeckers can be found here.

Even though it was already part of the Nahuel Huapi National Park, Los Arrayanes was created in 1971 to protect its forest of rare arrayán trees. To protect the soil and the roots of these fragile trees, a wooden path has been made for the tourist to enjoy the view of the cinnamon-coloured trees.

== Climate ==
The park has a cold, humid climate. Mean temperatures range from 3 °C (37.4 °F) in winter to 14 °C (57.2 °F) in summer. On average, the park receives 1,300 mm (51 in) of rainfall per year, most of which falls during winter. Snowfall occurs between July and September.

== Gallery ==
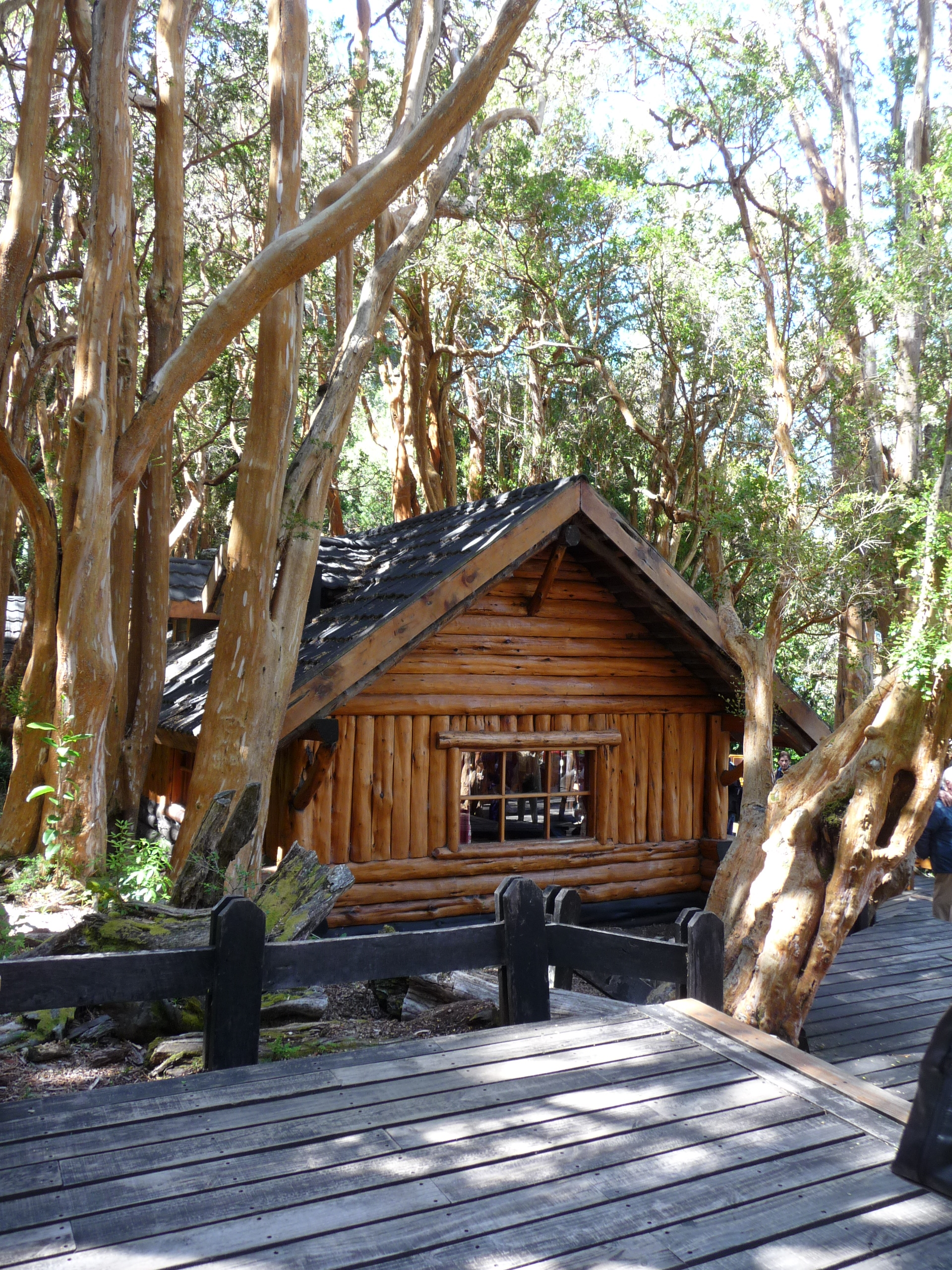
Little cabin in the arrayanes forest

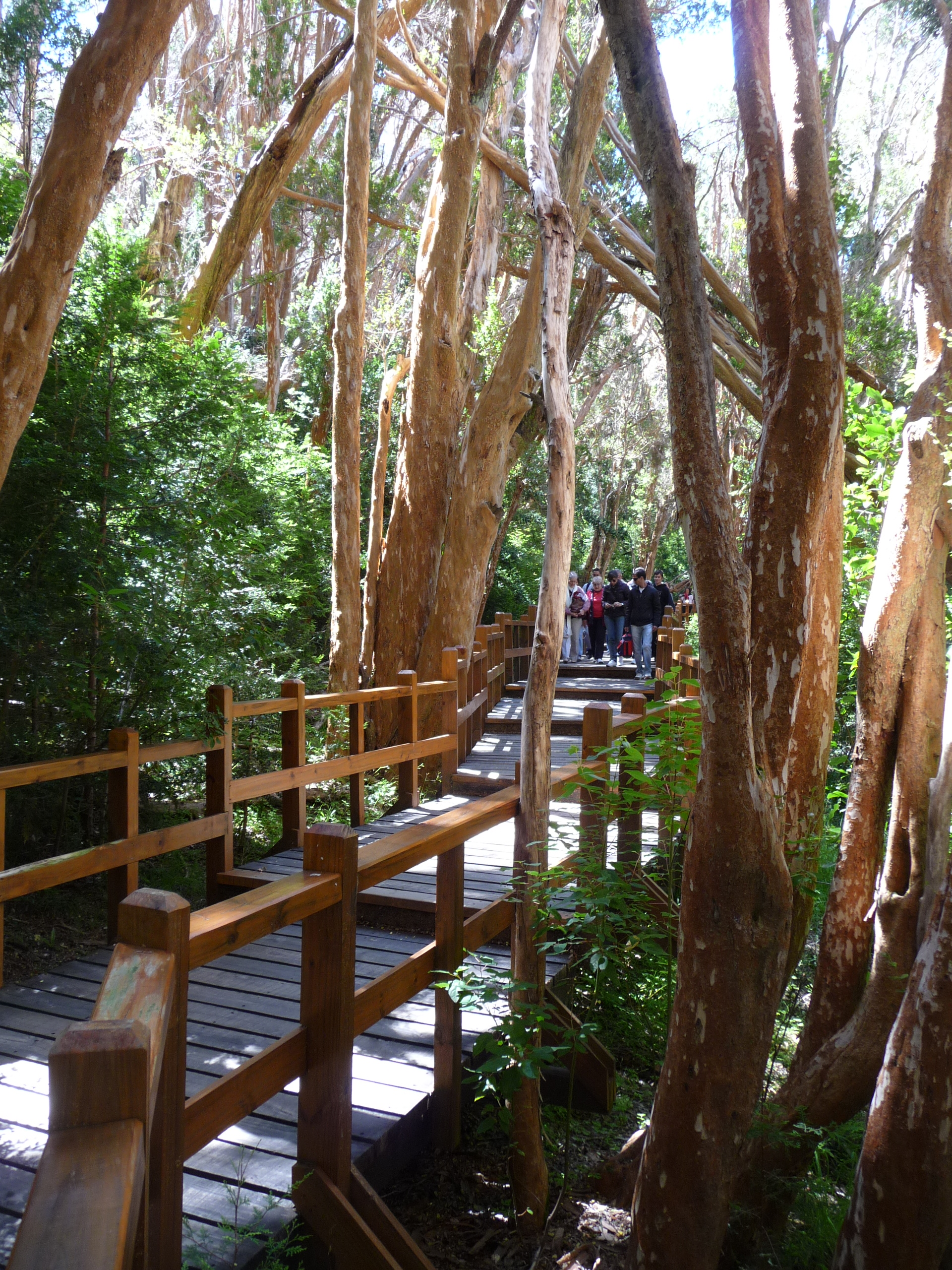
Wooden paths for tourists
