= Huinay =

Tract of land in Chile

Huinay is a tract of land belonging to the San Ignacio del Huinay Foundation. This territory covers nearly 350 km^{2} (135 sq mi) in the Commune of Hualaihué, in Los Lagos Region of Chile. It lies between the Comau or Leptepu fjord and the border with the Republic of Argentina in Palena Province. Its location is 42°22′S 72°24′W. Huinay also divides the private Pumalín Park founded by American Douglas Tompkins into two parts. Tompkins wants to purchase it to unify his park, however, this has met with strong opposition from the people in the hamlet of Huinay.

The Leptepu fjord is part of a 68 km (42 mi) longitudinal structural fault that runs from north to south, profoundly remodelled through the passing of the continental glaciers during the glaciations of the Quaternary period.

The ice field that slid through the fiord, trapped between the high mountains, carved the valleys deeply - they have subsequently been partially refilled with sediment, resulting in a remaining depth of up to 500 m below current sea level. In numerous places there is evidence of the glacio-isostatic structures that survived the postglacial eustatic advances during the last 15,000 years.

Huinay is under the influence of a cold and humid climate. The annual rainfall is very variable, with generally two or three comparatively dry months in summer in the fjord region with a strong increase towards the Andes mountain range, resulting in almost 6000 mm of annual precipitation in Huinay. The average yearly temperature is approximately 11.5 °C. This, together with the abundant rainfall, sustains the thick, evergreen, mixed, mild jungle that extends to the high-water mark along the walls of the fjord.
