= Comau Fjord =

Fjord that penetrates the mainland of Chile

Coordinates: 42°22′10″S 72°27′18″W

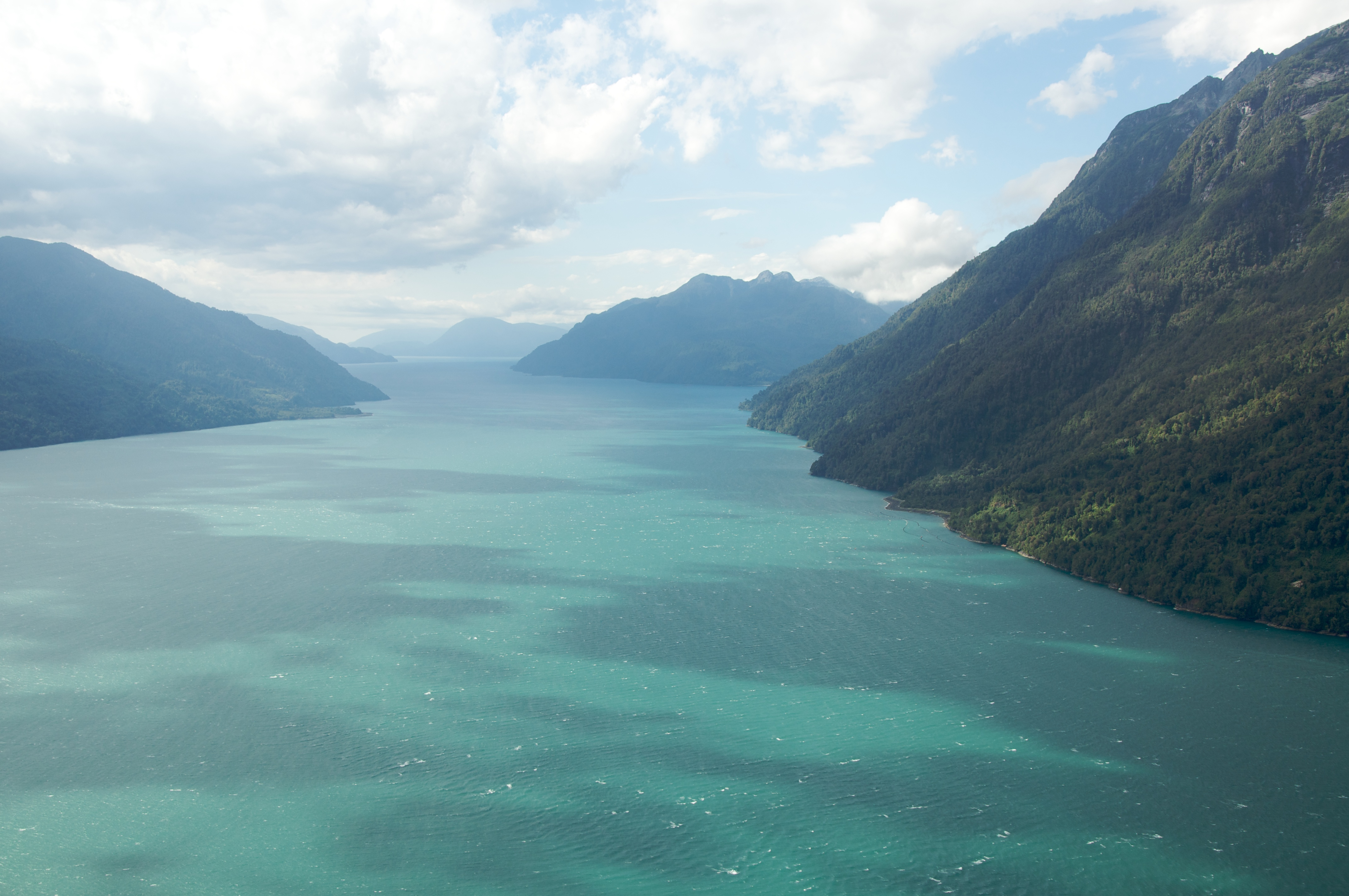
Comau Fjord

Comau Fjord, also known as Leptepu Fjord, is a fjord that penetrates the mainland of Chile, in Los Lagos Region. It runs in a generally north–south direction from the Gulf of Ancud and is 68 km long. The fjord receives the waters of the Vodudahue River.

== See also ==
- Pumalín Park
- Huinay
- Huequi
