= Michinmahuida =

Mountain in Chile

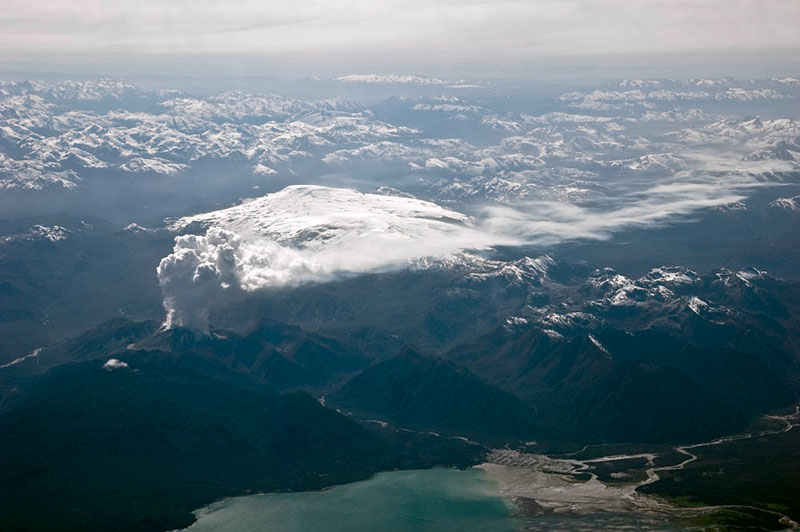
- The volcano is visible in the center of this image, right behind the ash column of the Chaitén volcano in eruption.

Highest point
- Elevation: 2,450 m (8,040 ft)
- Prominence: 1,518 m (4,980 ft)
- Listing: Ultra
- Coordinates: 42°47′57″S 72°26′45″W

Geography
- Location within Chile
- Location: Chile
- Parent range: Andes

Geology
- Mountain type: Stratovolcano
- Last eruption: February to March 1835

Michinmahuida (Spanish pronunciation: [mitʃinmaˈwiða]) (alternate spellings Minchinmávida or Michimahuida) is a glaciated stratovolcano located in Los Lagos Region of Chile. It lies about 15 km east of Chaitén volcano, and was extensively covered in ash during the 2008 eruption of Chaitén. The stratovolcano lies above the regional Liquine-Ofqui Fault zone, and the ice-covered massif towers over the south portion of Pumalín Park. It has a summit elevation of 2,450 meters above sea level.

== See also ==
- List of volcanoes in Chile
- Chaitén
- Chaitén (volcano)
- List of Ultras of South America

== Sources ==
- "Michinmahuida". Global Volcanism Program. Smithsonian Institution.
- "Volcán Minchinmavida, Chile" on Peakbagger
- "South American Summits Ranked by Re-ascent"
