= Corcovado (beetle) =

Scientific classification
- Domain: Eukaryota
- Kingdom: Animalia
- Phylum: Arthropoda
- Class: Insecta
- Order: Coleoptera
- Suborder: Polyphaga
- Infraorder: Cucujiformia
- Family: Cerambycidae
- Subfamily: Lamiinae
- Tribe: Hemilophini
- Genus: Corcovado; Lane, 1973

Genus of beetles

Corcovado is a genus of longhorn beetles of the subfamily Lamiinae, containing the following species:

- Corcovado bezarki Martins & Galileo, 2008
- Corcovado peruviense Lane, 1973
- Corcovado ruber (Bates, 1881)
