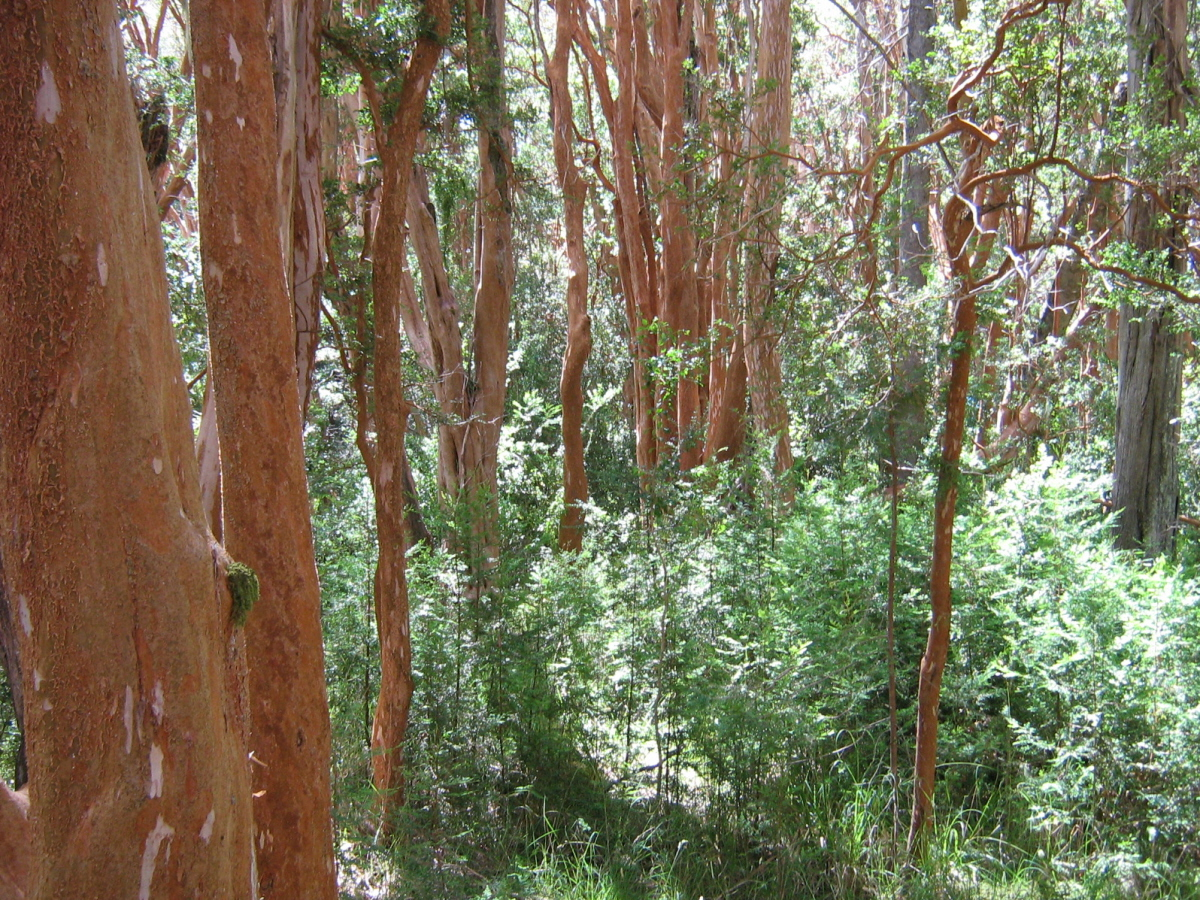
- Luma apiculata forest, in Los Arrayanes National Park, Argentina

Conservation status
- Least Concern (IUCN 3.1)

Scientific classification
- Kingdom: Plantae
- Clade: Tracheophytes
- Clade: Angiosperms
- Clade: Eudicots
- Clade: Rosids
- Order: Myrtales
- Family: Myrtaceae
- Genus: Luma
- Species: L. apiculata

Binomial name
- Luma apiculata (DC.) Burret

Synonyms
- List: Eugenia affinis Gillies ex Hook. & Arn. nom. illeg.; Eugenia apiculata DC.; Eugenia cuspidata Phil. nom. illeg.; Eugenia ebracteata Phil.; Eugenia gilliesii Hook. & Arn.; Eugenia hookeri Steud.; Eugenia luma O.Berg; Eugenia modesta Phil. nom. illeg.; Eugenia mucronata Phil. nom. illeg.; Eugenia palenae Phil.; Eugenia proba O.Berg; Eugenia spectabilis Phil.; Luma gilliesii (Hook. & Arn.) Burret; Luma hookeri (Steud.) Burret; Luma spectabilis (Phil.) Burret; Myrceugenella apiculata (DC.) Kausel; Myrceugenella grandjotii Kausel; Myrceugenia apiculata (DC.) Nied.; Myrtus chekenilla Kuntze; Myrtus chequenilla Kuntze

= Luma apiculata =

Species of plant

Luma apiculata, the Chilean myrtle, arrayán or temu, is a species of flowering plant in the myrtle family, native to the central Andes between Chile and Argentina, at 33–45° south latitude. Growing to 10–15 m (33–49 ft) tall and wide, it is a vigorous, bushy, evergreen tree with fragrant flowers.

== Description ==
The Chilean myrtle grows slowly, forming a small tree of around 10–15 m, rarely 20 m. Its trunk appears twisted and contorted and has smooth bark, coloured grey to bright orange-brown, which peels as the tree grows - giving a two-tone appearance of rich cinnamon colour, contrasted with cream. It is evergreen, with small, fragrant, oval leaves 2.0–2.5 cm long and 1.5 broad, and profuse white flowers in early to midsummer. Its fruit is an edible black or blue berry 1.0 cm in diameter, ripe in early autumn.

== Names and synonyms ==
Synonyms include Eugenia apiculata DC., Myrceugenia apiculata (DC.) Niedenzu, and Myrceugenella apiculata (DC.) Kausel. Common names include arrayán (from a Spanish name for the related European myrtle), kelümamüll (orange-wood) (the Mapuche Native American name), shortleaf stopper, palo colorado and temu.

== Etymology ==
Luma is a derivation of a vernacular Chilean name for this species, while apiculata means 'with a small, broadly pointed tip'.

== Habitat ==
The Chilean myrtle grows along water currents in the Valdivian temperate forests in Chile, while in Argentina it grows from Neuquén south to the Chubut River. The main forests are on the Quetrihué Peninsula (Mapuche for 'myrtles') and on Isla Victoria on the Nahuel Huapi Lake, within the Los Arrayanes National Park and Nahuel Huapí National Park, respectively, in Argentina. It can be also found in lesser numbers along the Arrayanes River in Los Alerces National Park. Trees in these protected areas are up to 650 years old. The notable Argentinian myrtle forest of the Los Arrayanes National Park covers 20 ha of the Quetrihué Peninsula, where the cinnamon-coloured myrtles leave almost no space for other trees.

== Cultivation and uses ==
Its fruit is appreciated in Chile and Argentina and its flowers are important for honey production. The Chilean myrtle has medicinal uses for the Mapuche people. It is also kept as bonsai and cultivated in gardens for the contrast of the glossy foliage and slender red stems. It has become naturalised in parts of Ireland and western Great Britain and it has been planted in Spain. It is also suspected to be naturalising in New Zealand and the Pacific Northwest of the United States.

This plant has gained the Royal Horticultural Society's Award of Garden Merit.

== Gallery ==
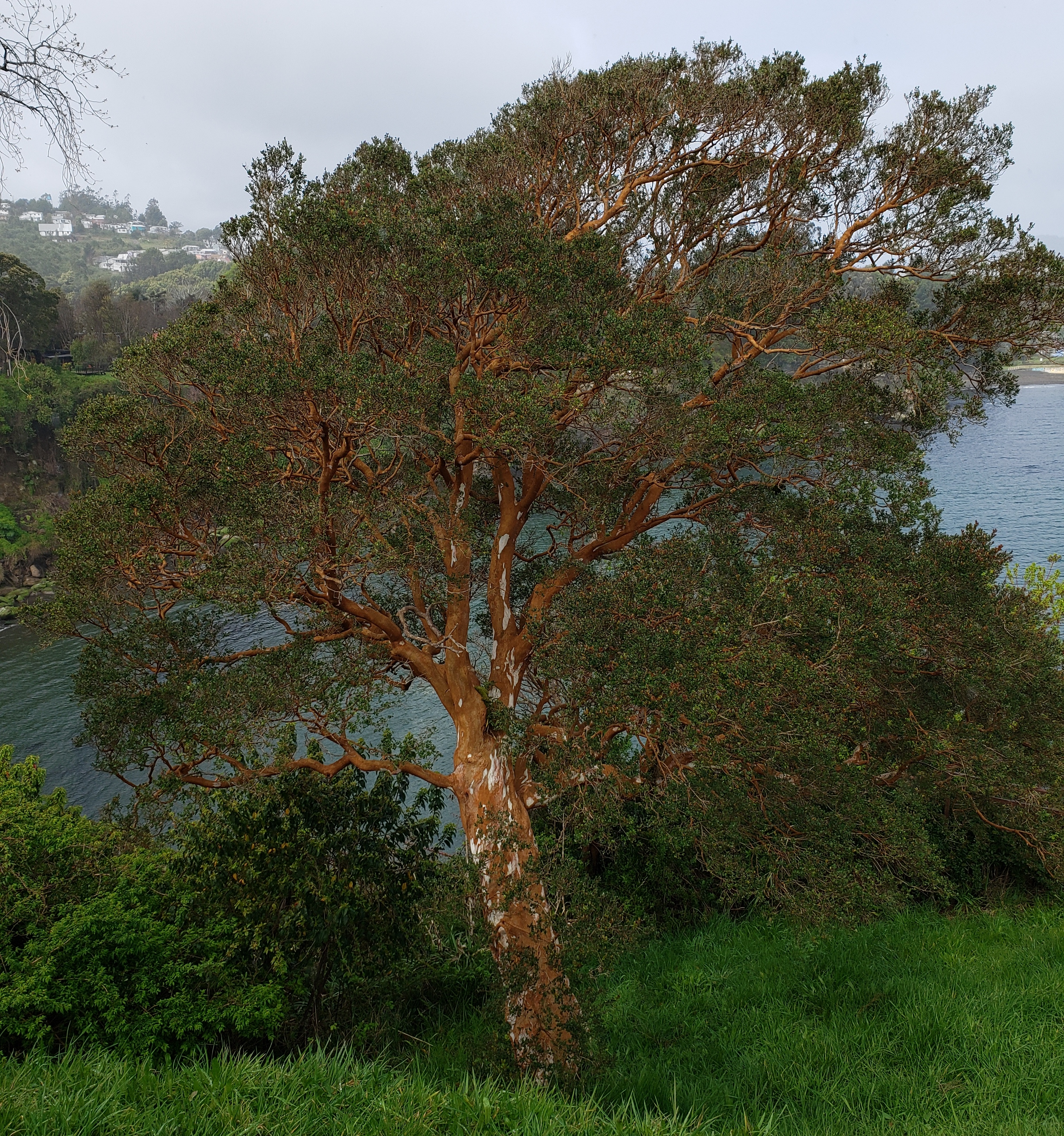
View of the whole tree

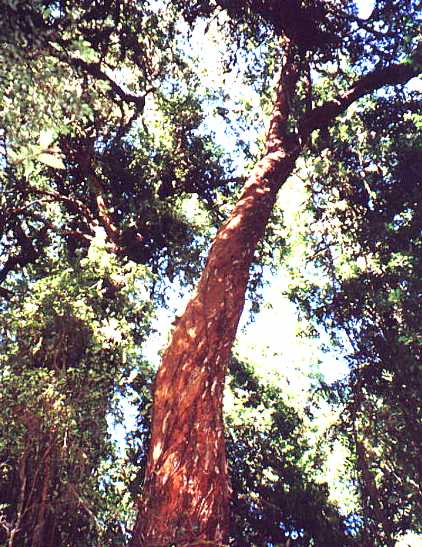
Chilean myrtle trunk in forest

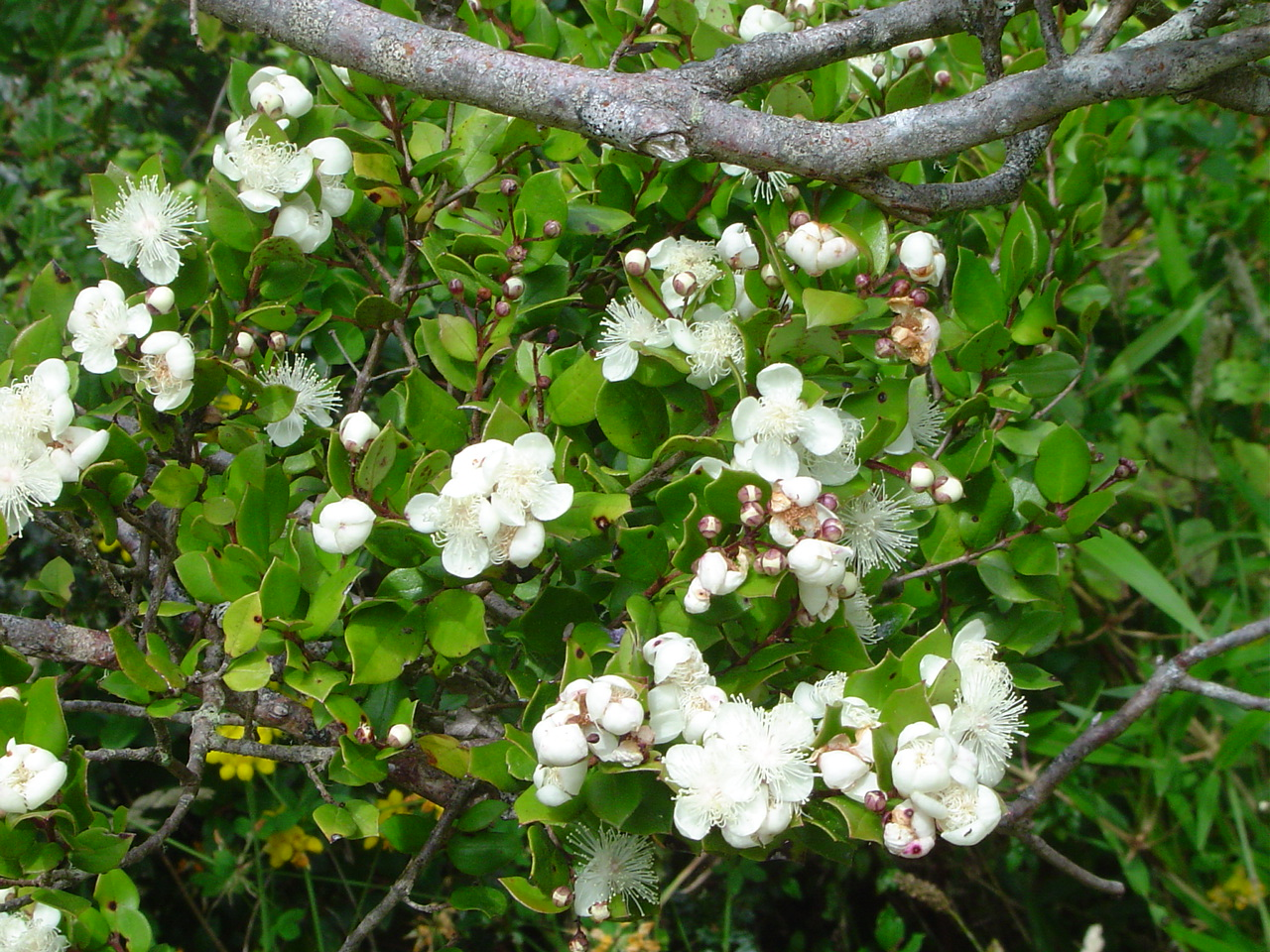
Flowers on a branch

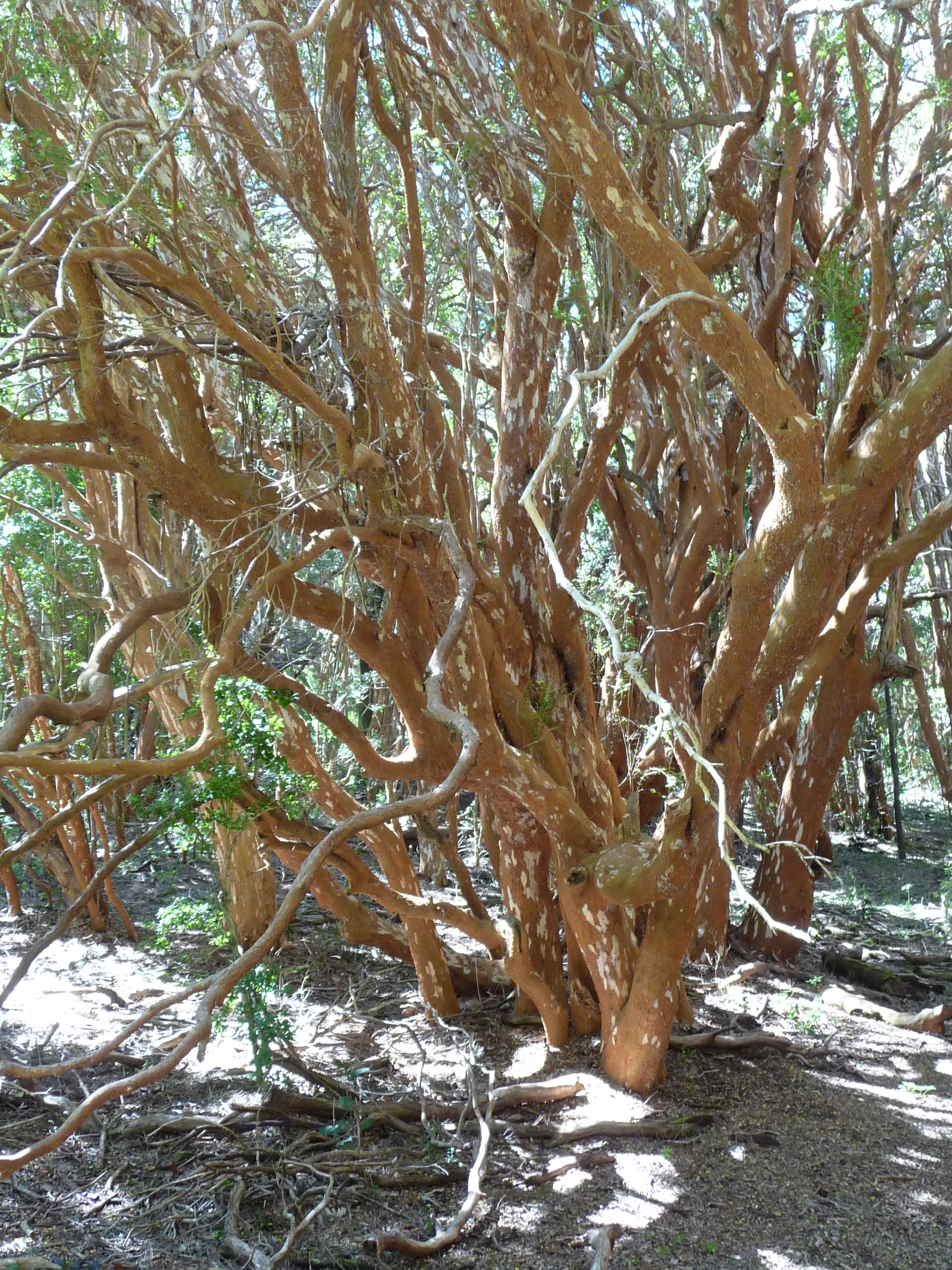
Arrayán in Los Arrayanes National Park.

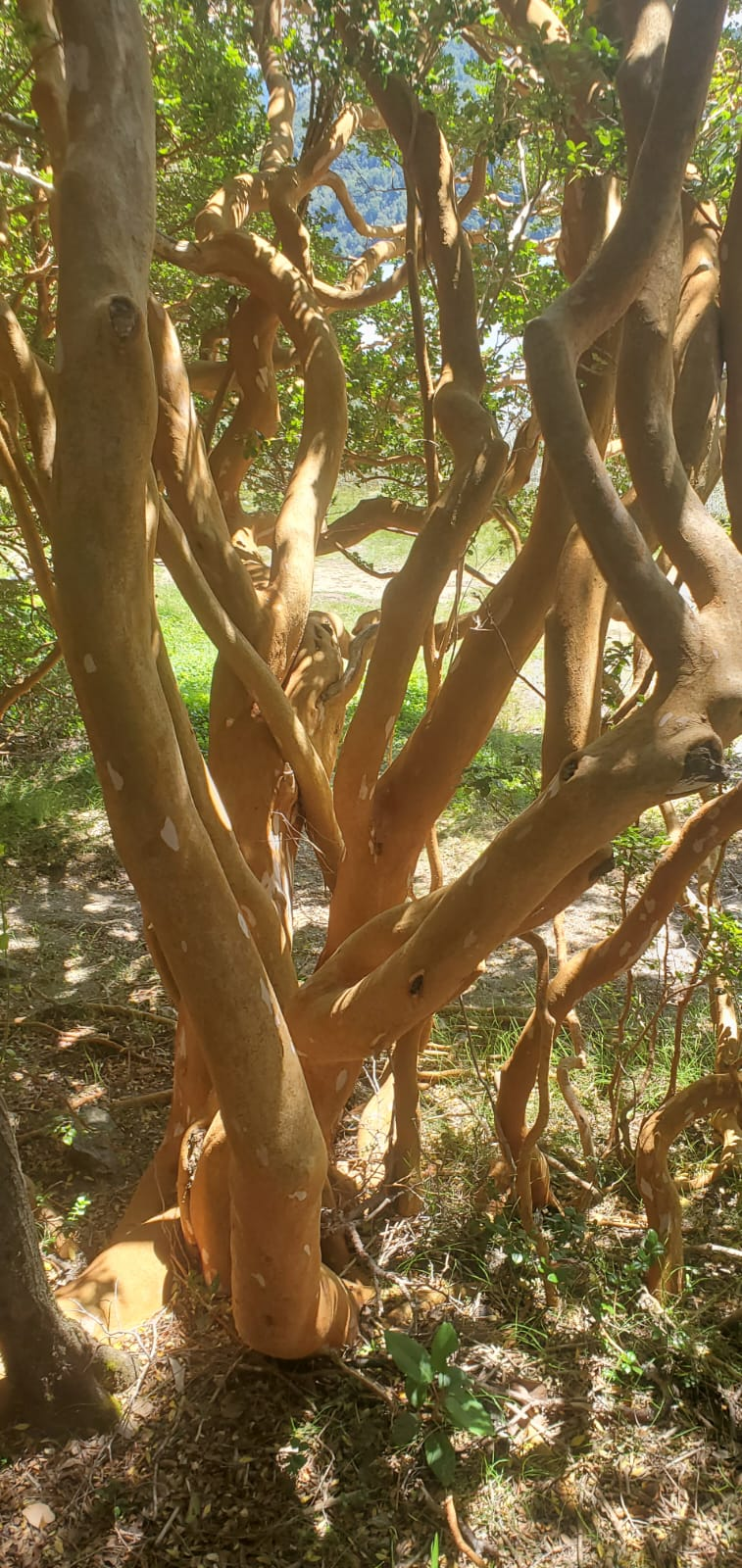
Arrayan (Luma apiculata)
