= Corcovado National Park (Chile) =

National park in Chile

- IUCN category II (national park)
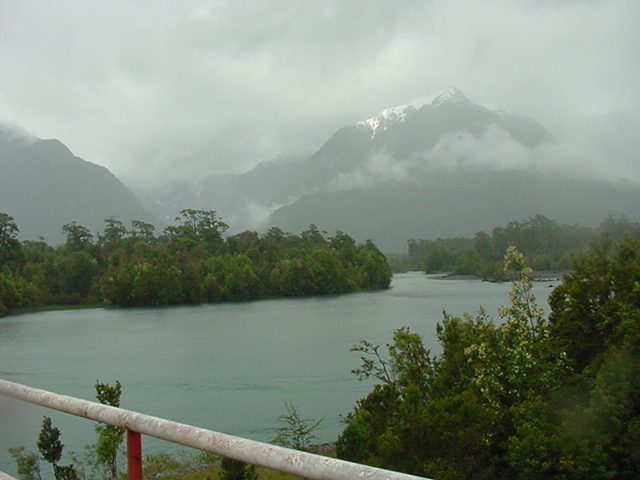
- View of Yelcho River in the park

- Location within Chile
- Location: Los Lagos Region, Chile
- Nearest city: Chaitén
- Coordinates: 43°25′0″S 72°43′0″W
- Area: 2,096 km^{2} (809 sq mi)
- Established: 2005
- Governing body: Corporación Nacional Forestal

Corcovado National Park is an 2,940-square-kilometre (726,000-acre) preserved area of Valdivian temperate rainforest, high peaks, alpine lakes, and rivers in Chile's Los Lagos Region. This coastal park borders the Gulf of Corcovado to the west and includes the iconic volcanoes Corcovado and Yanteles. This preserved area has one public access trail along the Carretera Austral.

== History ==
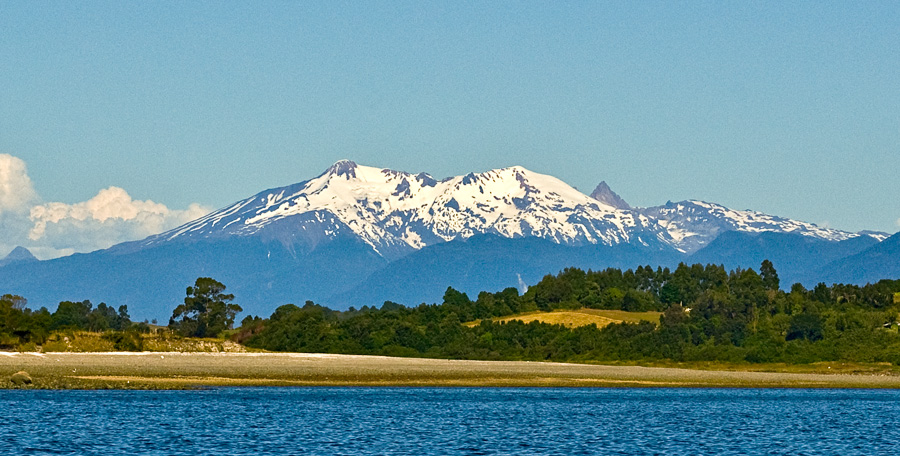
Yate volcano seen from Huar Island

Corcovado National Park represents an innovative joint public/ private conservation effort. While most of the park's area was previously federal land, mostly under the jurisdiction of the Chilean Armed Forces, the 1994 purchase of a key 840-square-kilometre (208,000-acre) parcel by the Conservation Land Trust (now the Tompkins Conservation) and U.S. philanthropist Peter Buckley sparked the effort to transform this area into a national park. In 2002, through an intermediary, Tompkins Conservation founder Doug Tompkins approached then-president Ricardo Lagos with a proposition: If the private lands around Corcovado were given to the people of Chile, would the government contribute the adjoining federal land and create a new national park? The property was not vital to military readiness, and both President Lagos and General Juan Emilio Cheyre, the nation's top military officer at the time, endorsed the idea. Corcovado National Park, Chile's fourth largest, was formally designated by President Lagos in January 2005, largely due to his determination.

An expedition to climb Cerro Corcovado was documented in the film 180 Degrees South, a 2010 film directed by Chri

== Geography and nature ==
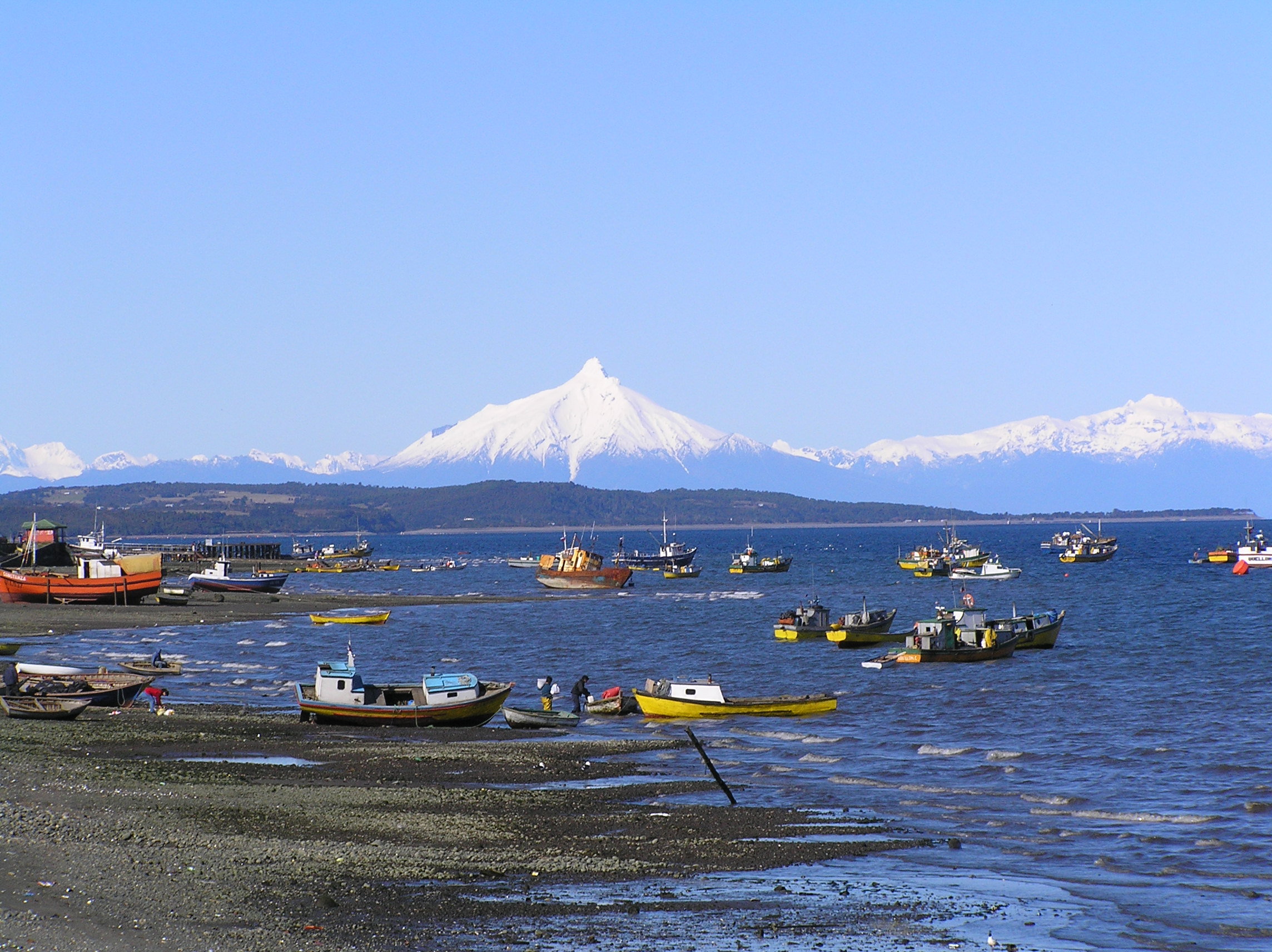
The park as seen from Quellón

This wilderness park of approximately 2,940 square kilometres (726,000 acres) contains some eighty-two lakes, many ringed with ancient forests where pumas haunt the shadows. The park hosts significant biodiversity, with about 18 mammal species, 64 bird species and 133 flora species. The brackish estuaries where the Corcovado and Tic Toc rivers spill into the Bay of Corcovado are exceptional wildlife habitat. Immense colonies of shorebirds coat the beaches. Penguins scamper about the rocks. Marine mammals, including seals and sea lions, thrive in the bay, which was discovered to be a crucial nursery area for blue whales, Earth's largest animals. The bay, once the lair of pirates, is now proposed to become Chile's first marine sanctuary, assuring a continuity of protection for wildlife from ocean bottom to mountain peaks.
