= Reñihué River =

River in Chile

- Location of mouth

Location
- Country: Chile

Physical characteristics
- Mouth
  - location: Pacific Ocean
  - coordinates: 42.4417250961045°S 72.7759754002504°W
  - elevation: 0 m (0 ft)

The Reñihué River is a river in the Palena Province of the Los Lagos Region in Chile.

== Pumalín Park ==
The river flows through Pumalín Park, a privately owned and publicly accessible nature reserve owned by The Conservation Land Trust. In 1991, Douglas Tompkins, an American leader of The Conservation Land Trust who was an environmentalist, conservationist and a former businessman, bought a large, semi-abandoned plot of land in the Reñihué River Valley of the Chilean province of Palena.

== See also ==
- List of rivers of Chile
