= Reñihué Fjord =

Fjord in Chile

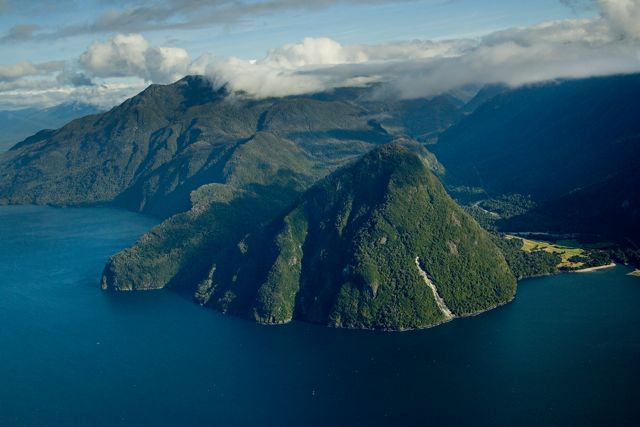
Caleta Gonzalo is visible in the very right portion of the image.

Reñihué Fjord is a fjord located at 42°30′59″S 72°37′26″W, in Los Lagos Region of Chile. It opens into Gulf of Ancud and at its head, it receives the outflow of Reñihué Lake via the river of the same name. Its waters are navigated by a ferry serving a part of the route between Hornopirén and Caleta Gonzalo. The latter is a locality and cove located on the south shore of the fjord.

The fjord is surrounded by densely forested mountains, which, in their majority, are part of Pumalín Park.
