= Gulf of Corcovado =

Body of water in Los Lagos Region, Chile

Coordinates: 43°22′00″S 73°21′13″W

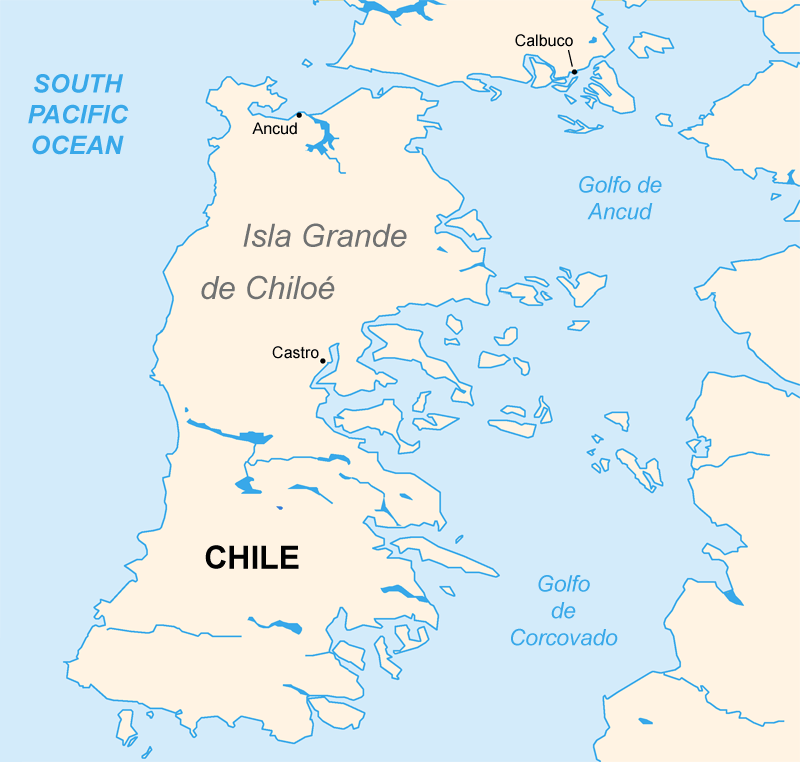
Chiloé Island and Gulf of Corcovado to the east

Gulf of Corcovado (Spanish: Golfo de Corcovado) is a large body of water separating the Chiloé Island from the mainland of Chile. Geologically, it is a forearc basin that has been carved out by Quaternary glaciers. Most of the islands of Chiloé Archipelago are located in the gulf. The area is next to the Chiloé National Park.

In colonial times the Gulf of Corcovado was a major obstacle that prevented major contact between the Spanish settlers in Chiloé Archipelago and the southern Chonos living in the archipelagoes of Guaitecas and Chonos. In the early 17th-century, Jesuits rounded the gulf instead of crossing it when traveling south by dalcas from their base in Castro.

== See also ==
- Corcovado National Park (Chile)
- Alfaguara project
- Moraleda Channel
