= Pumalín Douglas Tompkins National Park =

Protected area in Chile

- IUCN category II (national park)
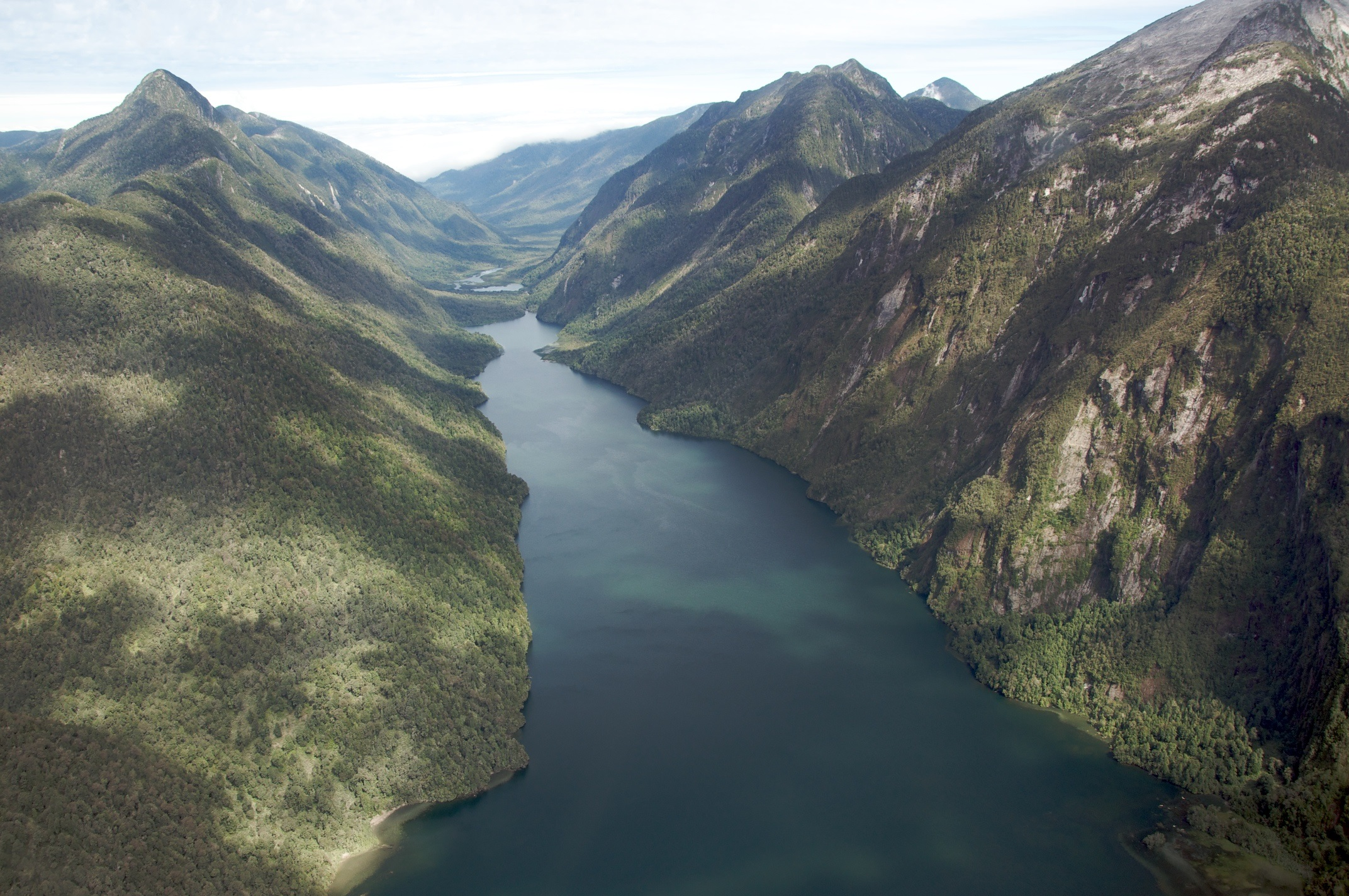
- Lago Negro, Pumalín

- Location within Chile
- Location: Los Lagos Region, Chile
- Nearest city: Hualaihué
- Coordinates: 42°35′04″S 72°29′46″W
- Area: 402,392 hectares (1,000,000 acres)
- Established: 2018
- Governing body: Corporación Nacional Forestal

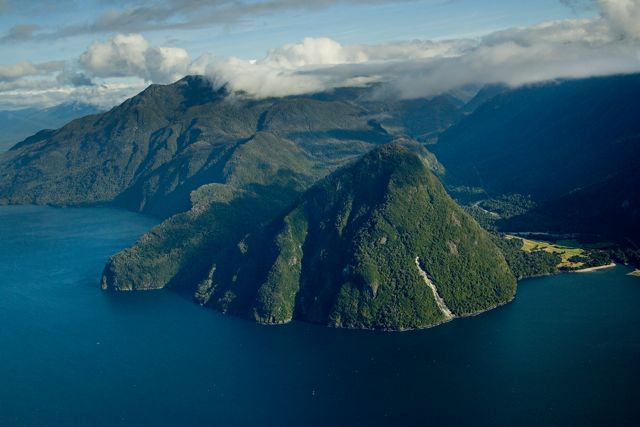
The fjords and temperate rainforest of Pumalín Park

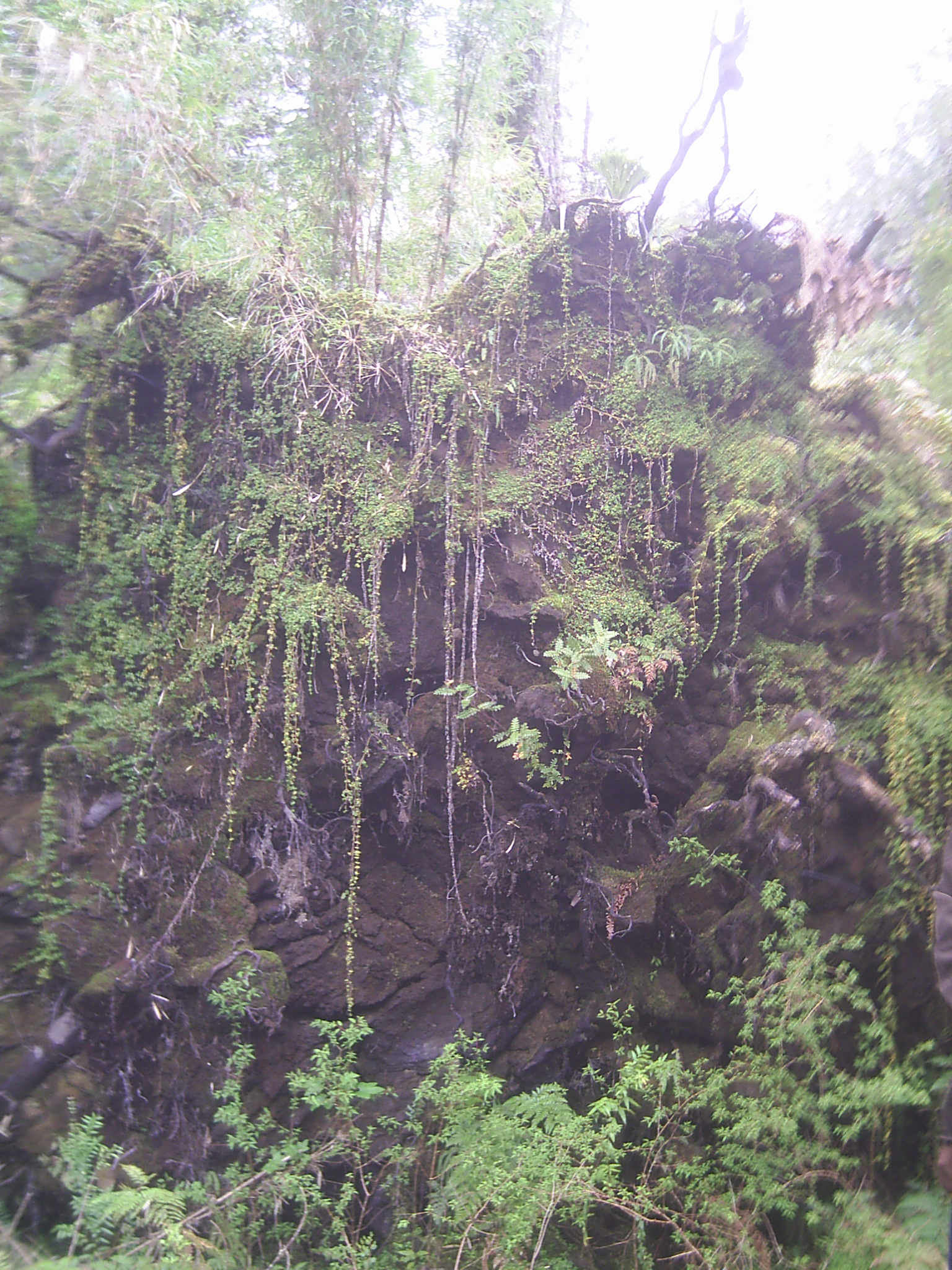
Virgin temperate rainforest in Pumalín Park

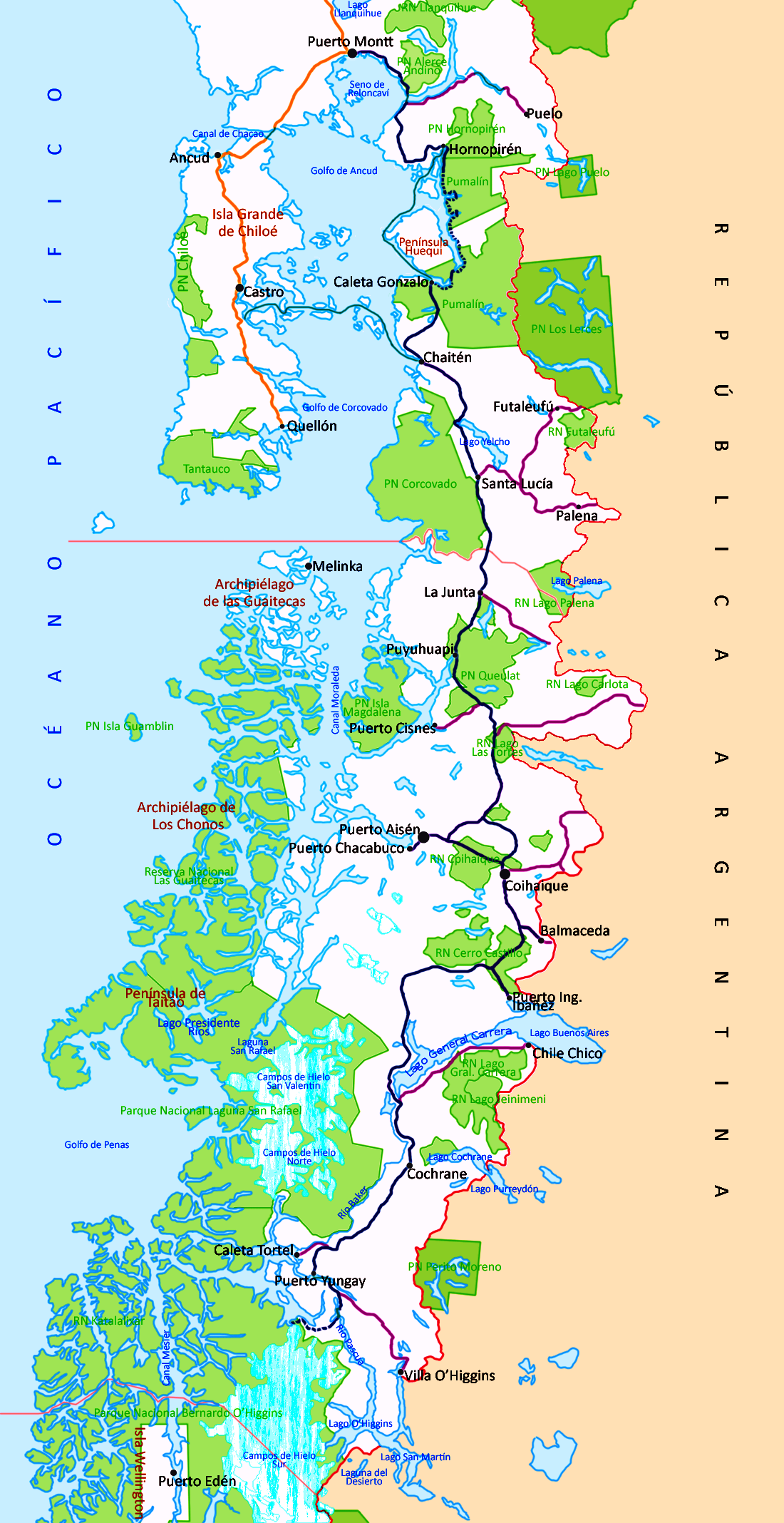
Pumalín Park is situated on the upper right corner of the map

Pumalín Douglas Tompkins National Park (Spanish: Parque Nacional Pumalín Douglas Tompkins) is a 402,392-hectare (1,000,000-acre) national park in the Palena Province of Chile, created by Tompkins Conservation, which was endowed and led by the American business magnate Doug Tompkins and his wife, former CEO of Patagonia, Inc., Kris Tompkins. Designated a Nature Sanctuary in 2005, Parque Pumalín was Chile's largest private nature reserve and operated as a public-access park, with an extensive infrastructure of trails, campgrounds, and visitor centers. By an accord announced on 18 March 2017, the park was donated to the Chilean state and became a national park.

== History ==
In 1991, Douglas Tompkins bought a large, semi-abandoned plot of land in the Reñihue River Valley of the Chilean province of Palena. A mountaineer and conservationist who had been visiting Patagonia since the early 1960s, Tompkins sought to protect the 17,000-hectare (42,000-acre) tract, most of which was primeval Valdivian temperate rainforest, from future exploitation. After moving to Reñihué to live full-time with his wife, Kris Tompkins, Doug began developing plans for a larger park, gradually acquiring additional adjacent properties from willing sellers. Ultimately, roughly 98 percent of the park's land area was bought from absentee landowners.

Tompkins Conservation (then called The Conservation Land Trust) subsequently added approximately 280,000 hectares (690,000 acres) in nearly contiguous parcels to form Pumalín Park, which was declared a Nature Sanctuary on August 19, 2005, by then-president Ricardo Lagos. This special designation by the Chilean government granted the land additional protections to secure its ecological values and prevent development.

While nature-related philanthropy has a long tradition in the United States, large-scale private land acquisition for parks was unfamiliar in Chile, and initially generated skepticism and political opposition. The land holdings which eventually turned into Pumalín Park, stretched from the border of Argentina to the Pacific Ocean, effectively cutting the country in half. This was once described as a security threat by a Chilean official. Some locals said that the Tompkinses were going to remove cattle from the land and introduce American bison. Others said that the land was going to be used as a nuclear waste dump. Over the years of the project's development, confidence has been built, both locally and nationally, as Pumalín Park's public access infrastructure began serving thousands of visitors annually.

Pumalín Park was designated a national park in 2018, prompted by Tompkins Conservation's donation of almost 293,397-hectare (700,000-acre) for the new 402,392-hectare (1,000,000-acre) park, named Pumalín Douglas Tompkins National Park in honor of its founder.

== Biodiversity ==
One of Tompkins' central commitments is to preserving biodiversity; the Pumalín conservation area not only provides visitors a spectacular wilderness experience, but also protects the area's threatened ecosystem and species. Although Chile lacks the faunal diversity of Amazon-area countries, it is rich in flora, with many endemic species and subspecies. The evergreen broadleaved forest, known in Chile as the Valdivian temperate rainforest, includes thousands of plant species. The annual rainfall in the coastal forests of Pumalín Park is approximately 6,000 mm (236 in). These exceptionally wet, original forests reach all the way to the ocean, something that is increasingly rare worldwide. In addition, the park protects some of the last remaining stands of Alerce trees, one of the oldest species on Earth, with 25 percent of the remaining population of these forest giants being protected within the borders of the park.

== The Park and the Local Economy ==
A ranger system, utilizing non-uniformed park rangers on the agricultural lands adjacent to the Nature Sanctuary, contributes to the park's stewardship. Small organic farms with activities such as animal husbandry, cheesemaking, ecotourism, wool handicrafts, and honey production function simultaneously as park ranger stations and visitor information centers. In this way both conservation and a contribution to the local economy are achieved. The project is aware of the need to include neighbors of the park, to create a broad-based cultural appreciation for wilderness and biodiversity conservation, as well as demonstrating how an agrarian economy, carefully matched to local conditions, can help sustain biodiversity and create economic opportunity.

=== El Amarillo ===
El Amarillo, the gateway town located at the park's southern entrance, was the site of a sweeping "beautification" campaign launched by the Tompkinses in 2007. Beauty was integral to the work of Doug Tompkins. He believed that a facelift to the town would instill pride in the local community and that pride would ripple and extend nationally. A nearby volcano eruption in 2008 decimated much of the town. Tompkins Conservation took on a special project of renovating the area. Among the renovations and new beautiful construction were four farms, a tourism building, two churches, the Puma Verde Market, a community center, two supermarkets, and over two dozen houses, all designed to suit the historic architecture of the area.

== Tourism ==
One of the biggest ecotourist attractions of south Chile, Pumalín is accessible by car or boat. Caleta Gonzalo, at the center of the Park, in the Reñihué Fjord, houses the park's main tourist infrastructure, including a restaurant, visitor center, cabañas (cabins), and a campground. Ferries run from the village of Hornopirén to Caleta Gonzalo during the summer months.

After the 2008 eruption of the Chaitén Volcano, the park was temporarily closed to visitors; it reopened to visitors in December 2010.
