= Chaitén (volcano) =

Active volcano in Los Lagos Region, Chile

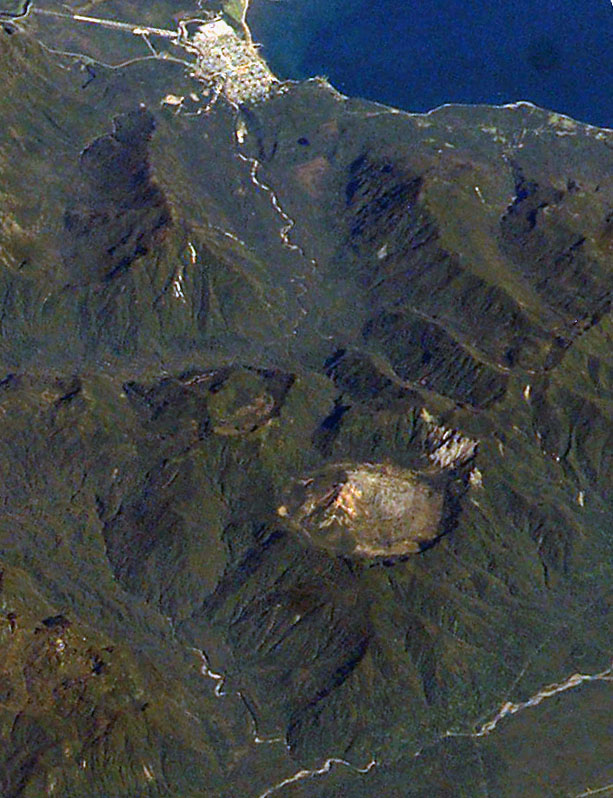
- 2003 photograph from the International Space Station. The caldera is the circular feature visible in the lower part of the image. The town of Chaitén is to the top. (This image is aligned roughly southwest, around 220°.)

Highest point
- Elevation: 1,122 m (3,681 ft)
- Coordinates: 42°50′14″S 72°38′53″W

Geography
- Location within Chile
- Location: 10 kilometres (6 mi) northeast of Chaitén, Palena Province, Los Lagos Region, Chile
- Parent range: Andes

Geology
- Mountain type: Caldera
- Volcanic belt: South Volcanic Zone
- Last eruption: 2008 to 2011

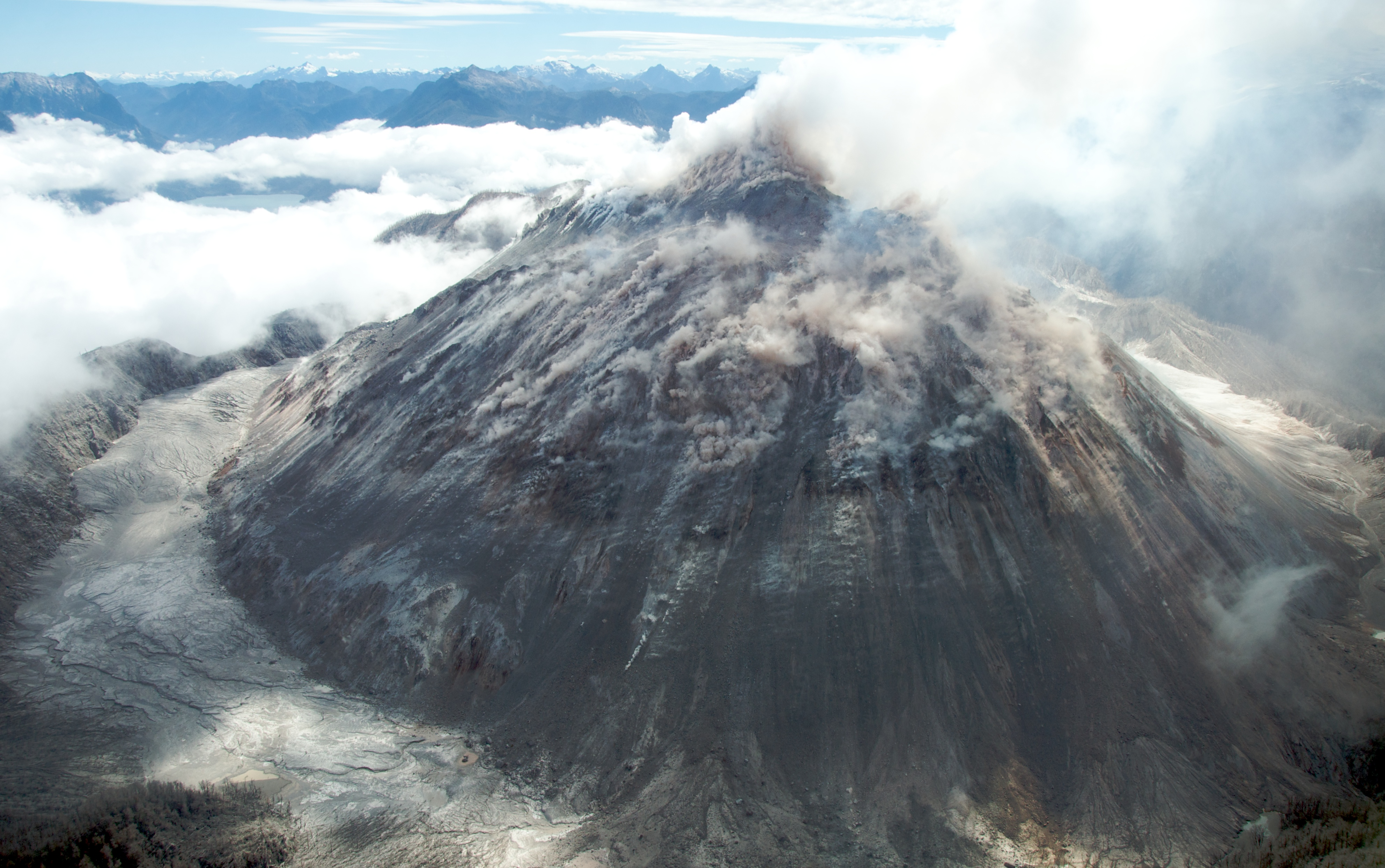
Image of the rhyolitic lava dome of Chaitén Volcano during its 2008–2010 eruption.

Chaitén is a volcanic caldera 3 kilometres (2 mi) in diameter, 17 kilometres (11 mi) west of the elongated ice-capped Michinmahuida volcano and 10 kilometres (6 mi) northeast of the town of Chaitén, near the Gulf of Corcovado in southern Chile. The most recent eruptive phase of the volcano erupted on 2008. Originally, radiocarbon dating of older tephra from the volcano suggested that its last previous eruption was in 7420 BC ± 75 years. However, recent studies have found that the volcano is more active than thought. According to the Global Volcanism Program, its last eruption was in 2011.

The caldera rim reaches 1,122 metres (3,681 ft) above sea level. Before the current eruption, it was mostly filled by a rhyolite obsidian lava dome that reached a height of 962 metres (3,156 ft), partly devoid of vegetation. Two small lakes occupied the caldera floor on the west and north sides of the lava dome.

The translucent grey obsidian which had erupted from the volcano was used by pre-Columbian cultures as a raw material for artifacts and has been found as far away as 400 kilometres (250 mi) to the south and north, for example in Chan-Chan.

== 2008 eruption ==
The Chaitén volcano entered a new eruptive phase for the first time since around 1640 on the morning of May 3, 2008. The Chilean government began an evacuation of the nearby town of Chaitén (population 4,200) and the surrounding area the same day, the main phase of which was completed by May 3, 2008. One elderly person died while at sea en route to Puerto Montt. By the afternoon of May 3, the plume of ash from the eruption had spread across Chile and Argentina to the Atlantic Ocean, contaminating water supplies, and reportedly coating the town of Futaleufú located 75 kilometres (47 mi) southeast to a depth of 30 centimetres (12 in). Ash thickness estimates are often exaggerated during volcanic crises; later field investigations suggest that the average ash thickness deposited across Futaleufú was less than 5–10 cm (2–4 in).

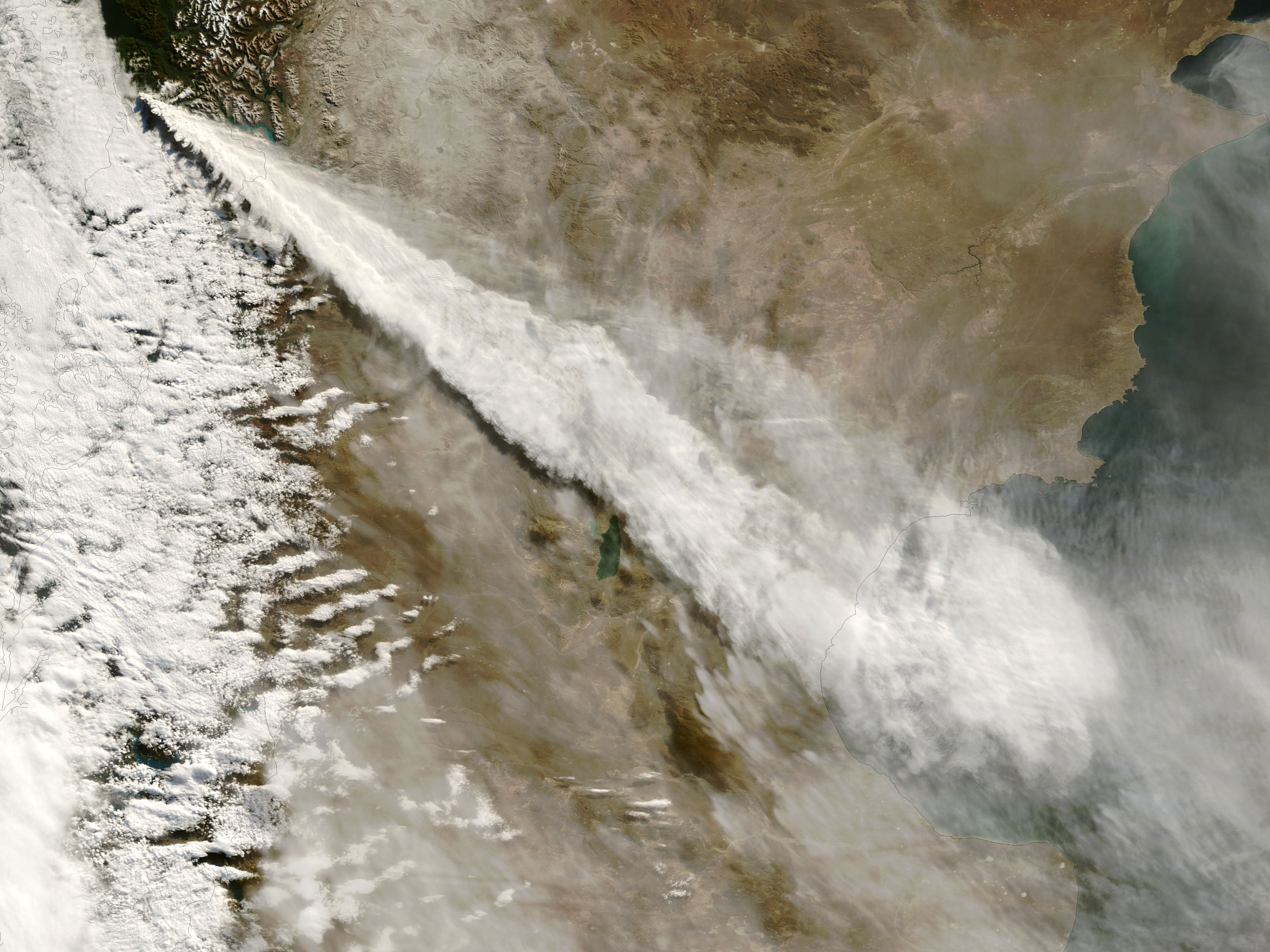
Image of the ash cloud from 2008 eruption stretching into San Jorge Basin in the Atlantic Ocean. MODIS, 2008-05-03.

A team of scientists from the US was dispatched to the area to assess the air quality and the risks from chemicals in the falling ash.

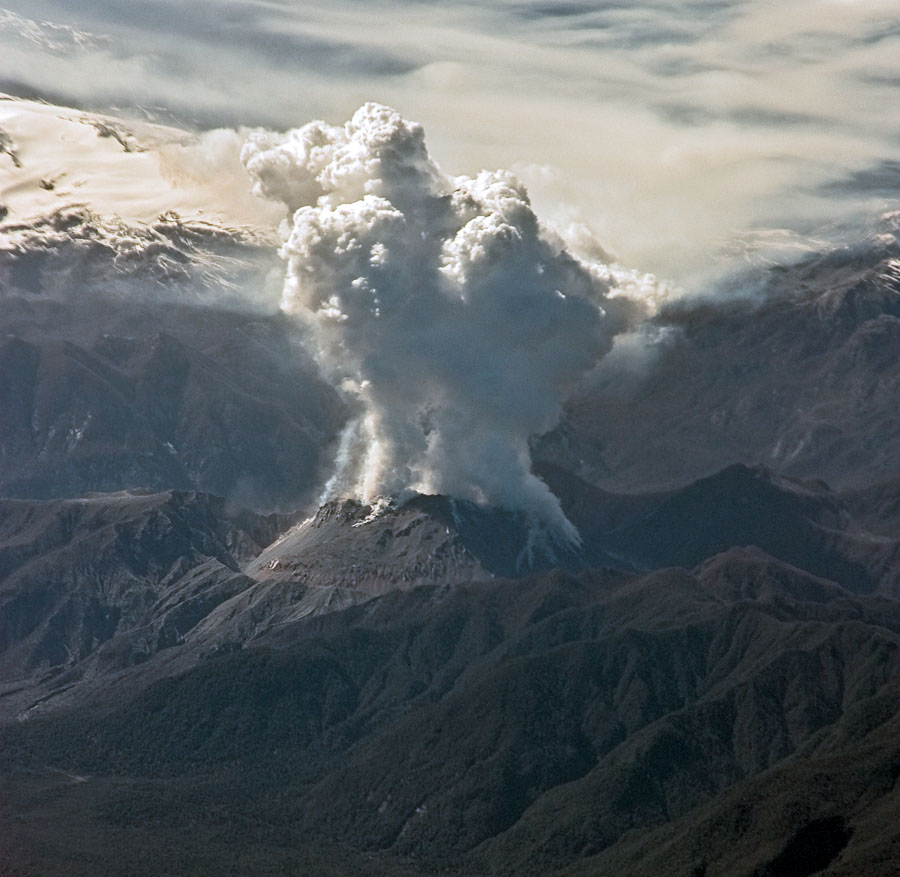
The Chaitén Volcano seen from a commercial flight, October 2008.

The initial phase of the actual eruption in 2008 was characterised by ash emissions and seismic activity; local seismic measurements in 2005 registered earthquakes up to magnitude 3.6 MW below the Chaitén volcano. On May 6, 2008, the force of eruption increased significantly, producing pyroclastic flows and possibly some lava explosions, and raising the eruption column to a height of perhaps 30,000 metres (98,000 ft). The remaining personnel and almost all inhabitants of Chaitén and nearby villages were evacuated, as was Futaleufú.

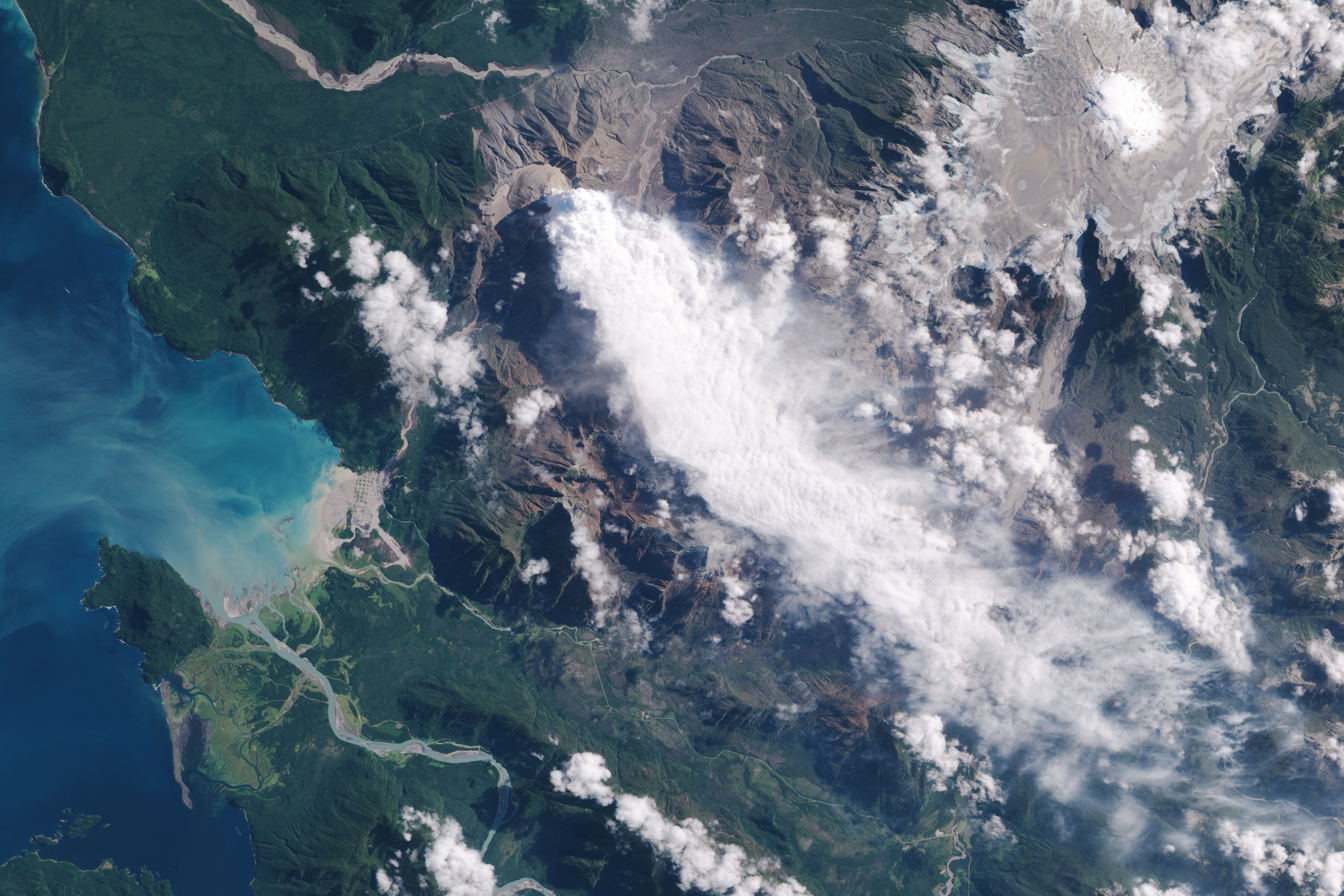
Image of the ash cloud taken on March 6, 2009. EO-1.

In the early phase of the eruption (May 2, 2008), two separate vents had developed in the old lava dome. An overflight on May 6, 2008, found that these had fused into one vent roughly 800 metres (2,600 ft) across. OVDAS warned of possible major pyroclastic incidents, and the likelihood of prolonged activity.

On May 8, 2008, the government said it would force the last residents from the danger area, but this was later legally challenged by some residents and left to no effect by the Supreme Court. Government personnel later returned to attend to livestock and rescue dogs and other animals.

Through the remainder of May and June 2008 the eruption continued as a variable but gradually decreasing emission of ash, with intermittent seismic activity and pyroclastic flows. On May 21, a new lava dome was observed to be forming in the crater, which by May 24 exceeded the height of the old dome. Initially, the dome extended towards the north side of the caldera, but following the emergence of two new vents in the south of the old dome around June 11 and a later one to the west, the expansion moved to the south, eventually blocking the drainage from the caldera floor.

As of July 3, 2008, Chaitén continued to erupt, with associated seismic activity, an eruptive column of ash up to 3,000 metres (9,800 ft), and a growing lava dome. Whether the dome will be stable remains uncertain, and there is an ongoing risk of collapse and explosive pyroclastic eruption. In August 2008, an expedition reached the summit of Chaiten volcano. The summit crater contained a 120 metres (390 ft) high lava dome. Earthquakes were felt at the summit. The lava dome was loudly degassing, and avalanches of lava boulders fell from the dome side to the crater floor.

On February 19, 2009, a partial dome collapse caused pyroclastic flows to descend through the Chaitén river valley reaching down to approximately 5 kilometres (3 mi) from the town of Chaitén. The ash once again reached Futaleufú and parts of Chubut province in neighboring Argentina. The approximately 160 people that were in Chaitén were strongly urged to leave, and all but 25 people who refused to leave were evacuated that day.

=== Damage ===
Forests near the volcano were burned by pyroclastic flows and lateral explosions. Large parts of southern Argentina and Chile were coated with ash, with possible longer term consequences for agriculture, although not only negative as ash adds new minerals to the soil. Beginning on May 12, lahars caused flooding in the town of Chaitén, depositing ash mud to a depth of up to a metre or more, damaging many buildings, and completely filling the original course of the Chaitén River past the town. Over the subsequent weeks, the river excavated a new course through Chaitén, destroying a significant part of it by July 2008. Initial plans to rebuild the town elsewhere were cancelled following a habitability study of Chaitén Sur.

The population of Chaitén fell from 7,182 inhabitants in 2002 to 2,485 people following the eruption. As at the 2017 census, the population was 5,071.

=== Rarity ===
This eruption is known as the first major explosive eruption of rhyolite magma in nearly a century, since the 1912 eruption of Novarupta, in Alaska. Although there have been rhyolitic eruptions in the southern section of the Southern Volcanic Zone in the past, these are relatively scarce and there is no historic rhyolitic eruption of the magnitude of Chaitén.

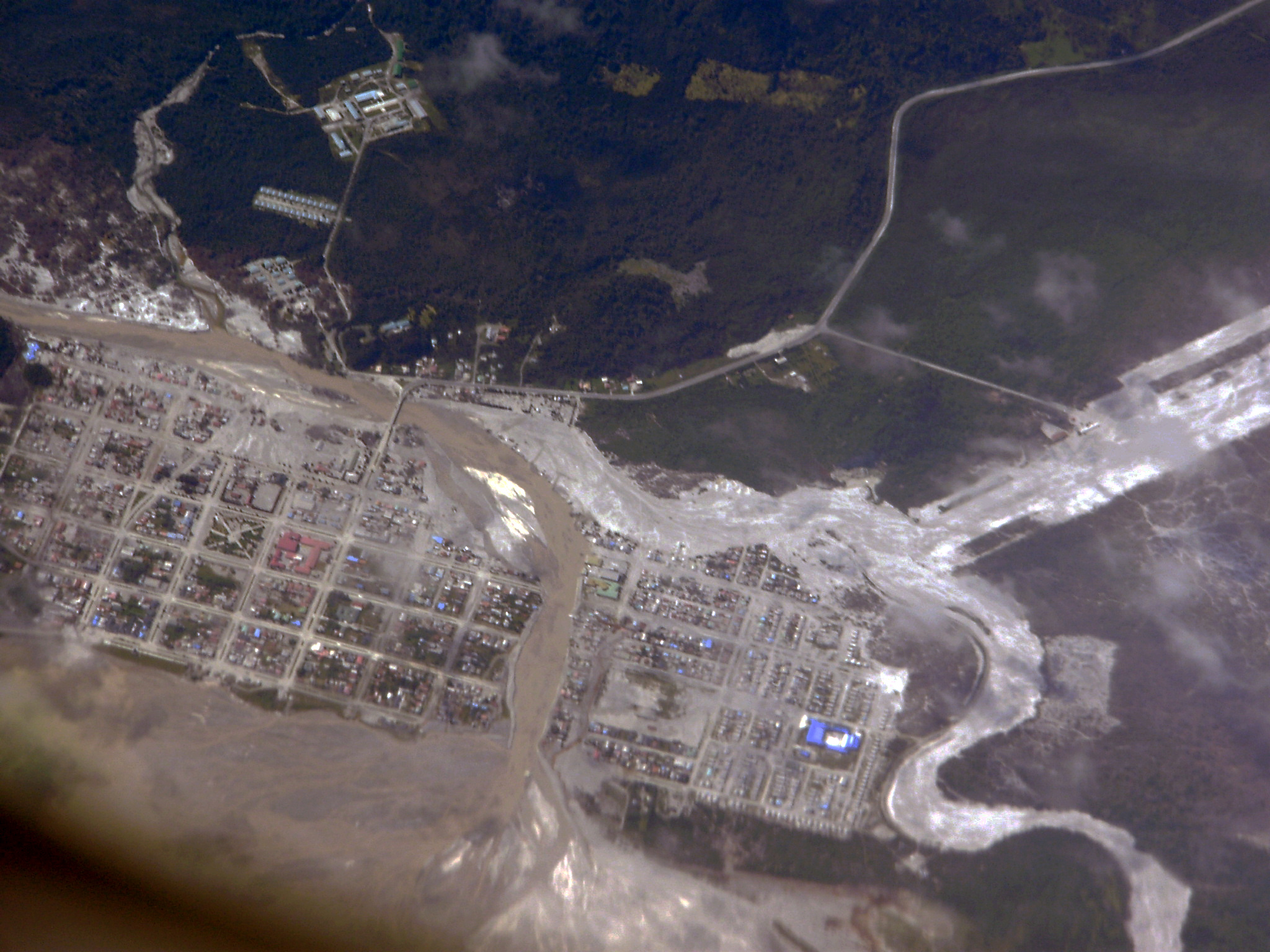
Areal view of Chaitén after the volcanic tephra filled the river bed—the river flooded and buried large parts of the town with volcanic material.
