= Chaitén =

- Town and Commune
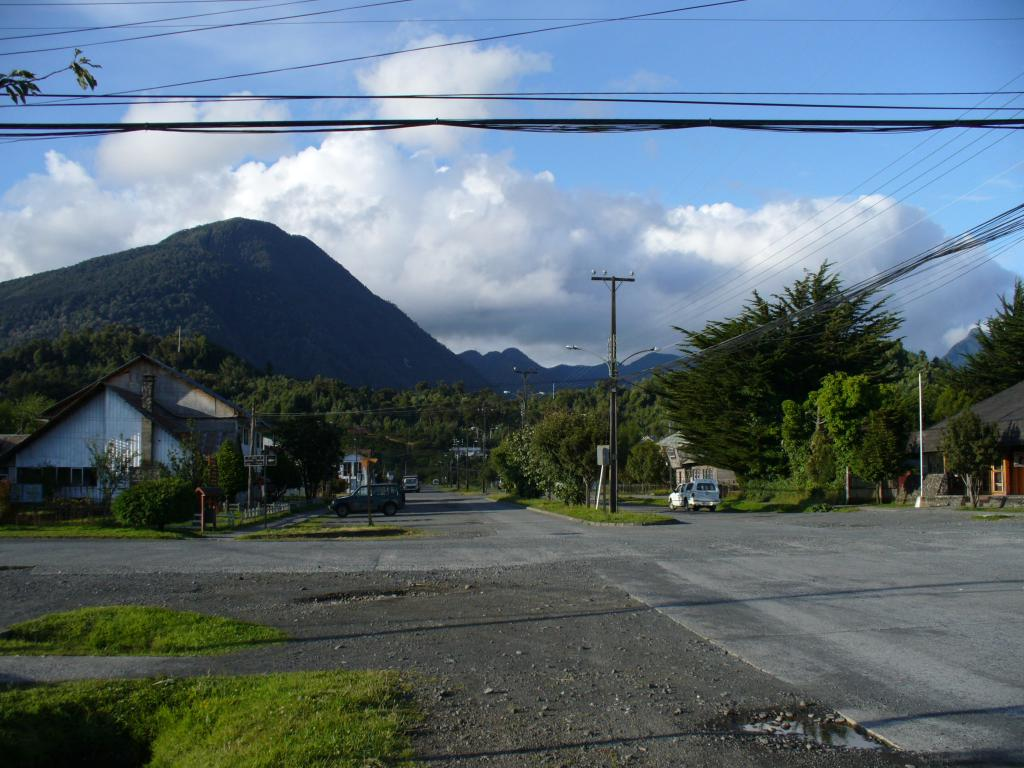
- The town of Chaitén in 2007

- Coat of arms Location of Chaitén commune in Los Lagos Region Location in Chile
- Coordinates (city): 42°55′0″S 72°42′0″W
- Country: Chile
- Region: Los Lagos
- Province: Palena
- Founded: 1933
- Evacuated: May 2008

Government
  - Type: Municipality
  - Alcalde: Pedro Vásquez Celedón (ILE)

Area
  - Town and Commune: 8,470.5 km^{2} (3,270.5 sq mi)
- Elevation: 12 m (39 ft)

Population (2012 census)
  - Town and Commune: 3,347
  - Density: 0.3951/km^{2} (1.023/sq mi)
  - Urban: 4,065
- Time zone: UTC-4 (CLT)
  - Summer (DST): UTC-3 (CLST)
- Area code: country 56 + city = 65
- Climate: Cfb
- Website: www.munichaiten.cl

Chaitén (/tʃaɪˈtɛn/, chy-TEN) is a Chilean town, commune and former capital of the Palena Province in Los Lagos Region. The town is north of the mouth of Yelcho River, on the east coast of the Gulf of Corcovado. The town is strategically close to the northern end of the Carretera Austral, where the highway goes inland. The Desertores Islands are part of the commune.

== Demographics ==
Historical population
| Year | Pop. | ±% p.a. |
|---|---|---|
| 1970 | 4,718 | — |
| 1982 | 7,016 | +3.36% |
| 1992 | 7,256 | +0.34% |
| 2002 | 7,182 | −0.10% |
| 2017 | 5,071 | −2.29% |
| 2024 | 4,025 | −3.25% |
Source: "Censo de Población y Vivienda". National Statistics Institute.

== Evacuation ==
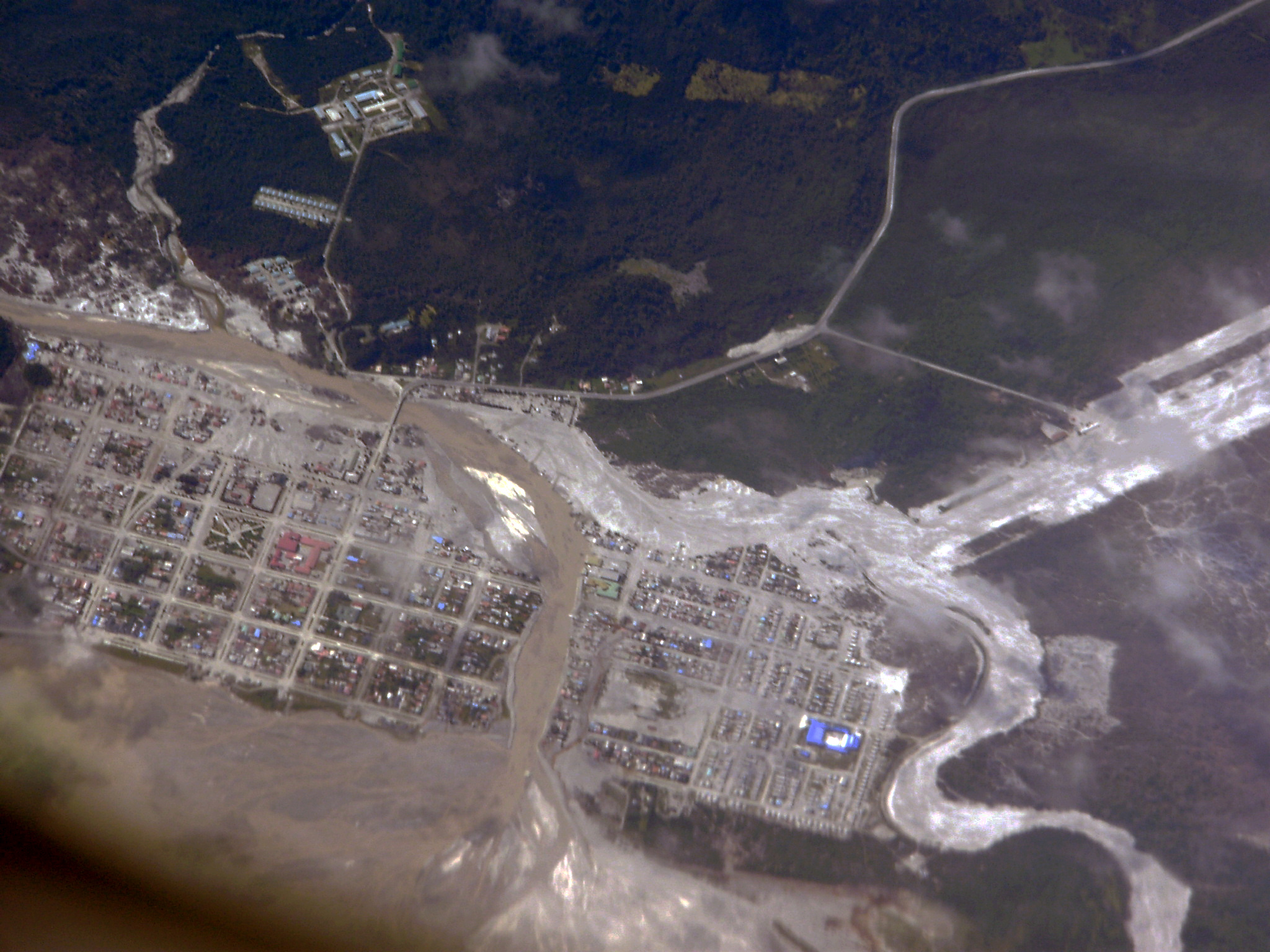
The river's new course shown in the center of the image. North is to the left.

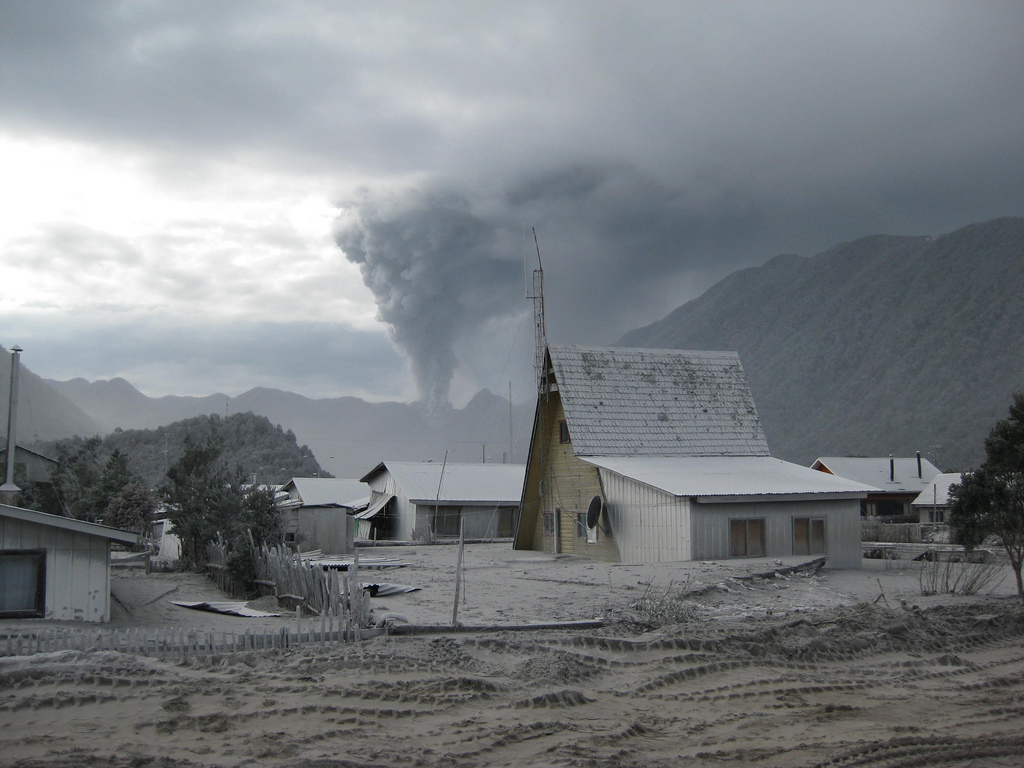
Following the eruption of the Chaitén volcano, a lahar destroyed much of the town of Chaitén.

The town was evacuated in May 2008 when the Chaitén volcano erupted for the first time in more than 9,000 years. The eruption, which commenced May 2, became more violent on May 5, throwing up a high plume of ash and sulfurous steam that rose to 19 miles (31 km), from which ashfall drifted across Patagonia and over the Atlantic Ocean. During 2005 small earthquakes occurred below Chaitén and the nearby Liquiñe-Ofqui Fault Zone.

The town was completely flooded on May 12, 2008, after a lahar caused the banks of the Blanco River to overflow about 200 m (660 ft) on each side. Over the subsequent weeks, the river excavated a new course through Chaitén, completely destroying a significant part of it by July 2008. This process is still ongoing; it is unclear how extensive the damage will ultimately be. Some defensive work has been undertaken by the government, but they ultimately decided to abandon the town, relocating and compensating all residents. The provincial capital was provisionally moved to Futaleufú after the eruption breakout, but the capital shift was later on declared permanent. The future of the town has become a matter of political controversy in Chile.

== Reconstruction of Chaitén ==
On February 25, 2009, the government announced plans to rebuild Chaitén 10 km (6.2 mi) north of its current location in a coastal place known as Santa Bárbara or "Fandango Norte". On March 3, 2009, construction work on the new town's administrative facilities started.

On April 9, 2011, president Sebastián Piñera announced a program to rebuild the town on its existing northern area, reversing plans by the previous administration to move the town to a different location farther north.

== Climate ==
Climate data for Chaitén
| Month | Jan | Feb | Mar | Apr | May | Jun | Jul | Aug | Sep | Oct | Nov | Dec | Year |
|---|---|---|---|---|---|---|---|---|---|---|---|---|---|
| Record high °C (°F) | 29.0 (84.2) | 31.4 (88.5) | 27.6 (81.7) | 23.2 (73.8) | 22.0 (71.6) | 17.0 (62.6) | 21.2 (70.2) | 19.2 (66.6) | 23.6 (74.5) | 24.8 (76.6) | 27.0 (80.6) | 28.0 (82.4) | 31.4 (88.5) |
| Mean daily maximum °C (°F) | 17.8 (64.0) | 17.5 (63.5) | 16.2 (61.2) | 14.1 (57.4) | 11.9 (53.4) | 9.9 (49.8) | 9.5 (49.1) | 10.5 (50.9) | 11.8 (53.2) | 13.2 (55.8) | 14.8 (58.6) | 16.5 (61.7) | 13.6 (56.6) |
| Daily mean °C (°F) | 14.9 (58.8) | 14.6 (58.3) | 13.5 (56.3) | 11.6 (52.9) | 9.8 (49.6) | 7.9 (46.2) | 7.4 (45.3) | 8.2 (46.8) | 9.3 (48.7) | 10.7 (51.3) | 12.3 (54.1) | 13.9 (57.0) | 11.2 (52.1) |
| Mean daily minimum °C (°F) | 10.5 (50.9) | 9.9 (49.8) | 9.3 (48.7) | 7.9 (46.2) | 7.2 (45.0) | 5.5 (41.9) | 4.9 (40.8) | 5.3 (41.5) | 5.5 (41.9) | 6.7 (44.1) | 8.2 (46.8) | 9.8 (49.6) | 7.6 (45.6) |
| Record low °C (°F) | 0.7 (33.3) | 3.0 (37.4) | 0.1 (32.2) | −1.2 (29.8) | −2.2 (28.0) | −3.6 (25.5) | −3.6 (25.5) | −2.7 (27.1) | −2.6 (27.3) | −1.0 (30.2) | 0.6 (33.1) | 0.0 (32.0) | −3.6 (25.5) |
| Average precipitation mm (inches) | 211.6 (8.33) | 182.2 (7.17) | 237.0 (9.33) | 308.8 (12.16) | 424.3 (16.70) | 447.4 (17.61) | 367.6 (14.47) | 369.7 (14.56) | 312.9 (12.32) | 272.1 (10.71) | 240.1 (9.45) | 245.6 (9.67) | 3,619.3 (142.48) |
| Average precipitation days (≥ 1.0 mm) | 17 | 15 | 17 | 21 | 24 | 23 | 23 | 23 | 22 | 20 | 19 | 18 | 242 |
| Average relative humidity (%) | 78 | 80 | 82 | 84 | 86 | 85 | 84 | 83 | 81 | 79 | 78 | 77 | 81 |
Source: Dirección Meteorológica de Chile

== Nearby attractions ==
Nearby attractions include:

- Corcovado National Park, which includes Corcovado volcano
- Pumalín Park, which includes Michinmahuida volcano
- Yelcho Lake
- Carretera Austral
- Futaleufu River
