= Chiloé Archipelago =

Group of islands in Chile

Coordinates: 42°36′S 73°57′W

Chiloe Archipelago Archipiélago de Chiloé (Spanish)
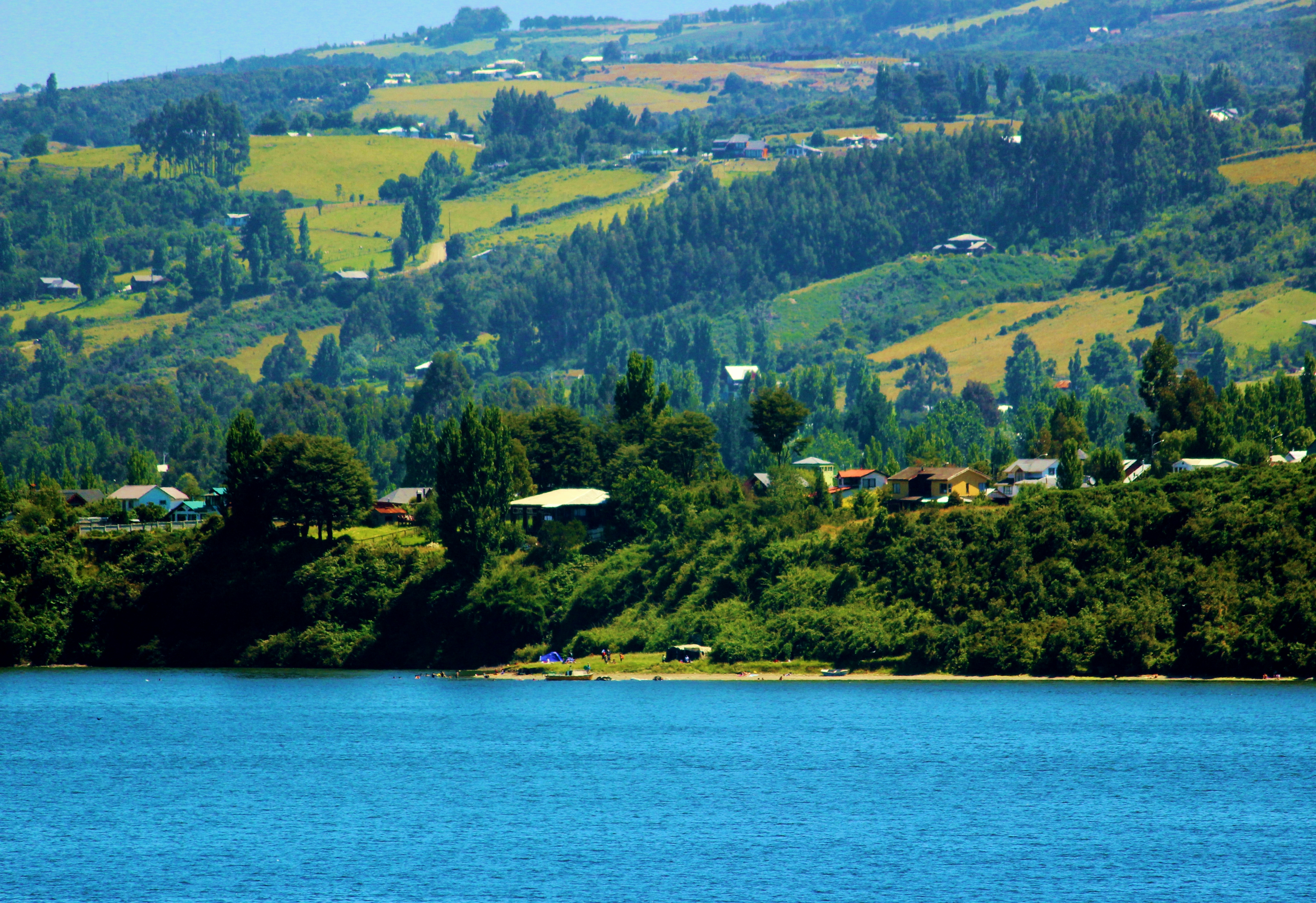
- Countryside in the outskirts of the city of Castro

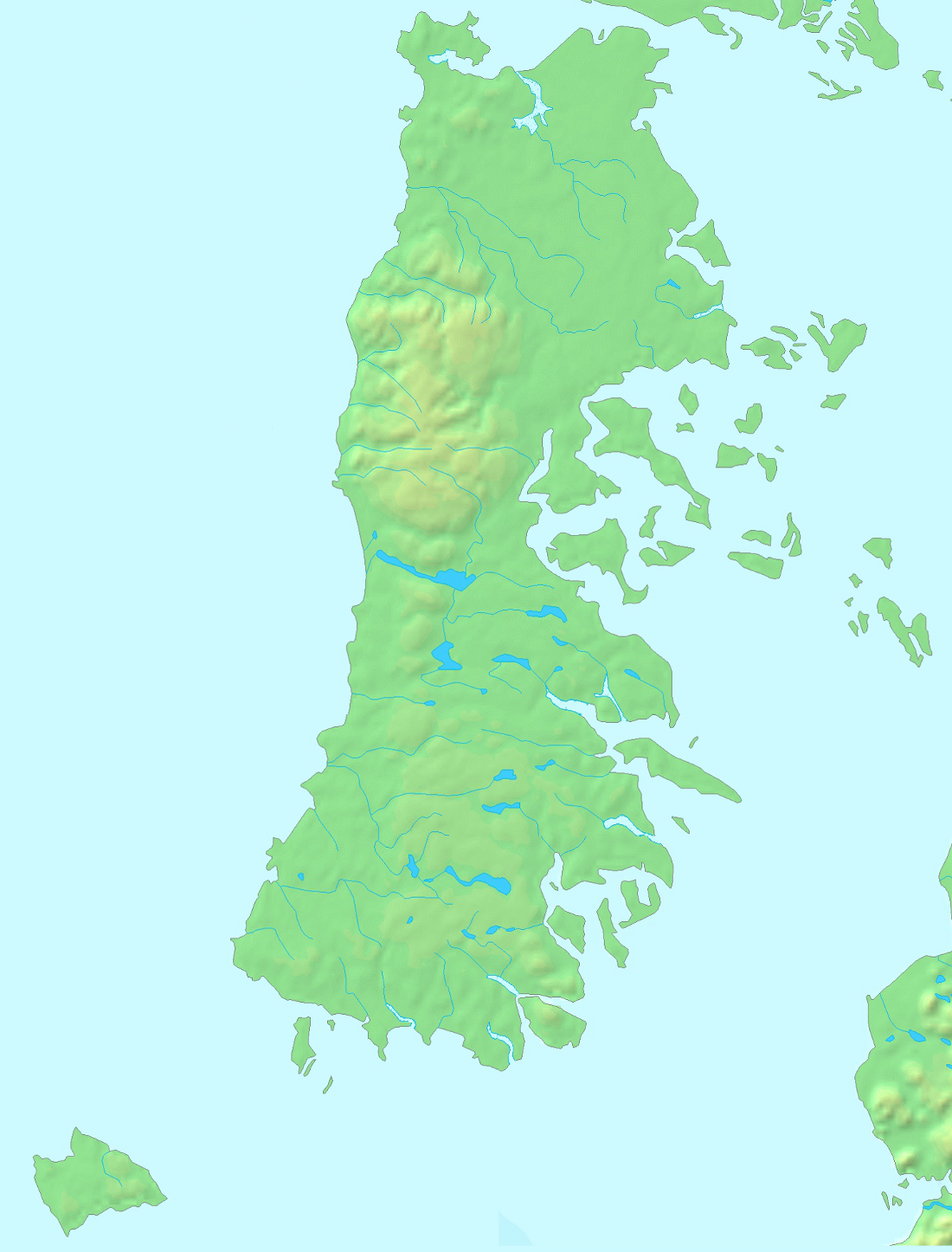
- Map of the Chiloé Archipelago
- Country: Chile
- Region: Los Lagos
- Province: Chiloé
- Capital city: Castro

Area
  - Total: 9,181 km^{2} (3,545 sq mi)
- (1.21% of Chile)

Population (2024)
  - Total: 176,865
  - Density: 19.26/km^{2} (49.89/sq mi)
  - Percent: 0.95% of Chile
- Common religion: Catholicism
- Common languages: Chilote Spanish, Chilean Spanish
- Demonym: Chilote (es: Chilote)

The Chiloé Archipelago (Spanish: Archipiélago de Chiloé, pronounced [tʃiloˈe], locally [ʃiloˈe]) is a group of islands lying off the coast of Chile, in the Los Lagos Region. It is separated from mainland Chile by the Chacao Channel in the north, the Sea of Chiloé in the east and the Gulf of Corcovado in the southeast. All islands except the Desertores Islands form Chiloé Province. The main island is Chiloé Island. Of roughly rectangular shape, the southwestern half of this island is a wilderness of contiguous forests, wetlands and, in some places, mountains. The landscape of the northeastern sectors of Chiloé Island and the islands to the east is dominated by rolling hills, with a mosaic of pastures, forests and cultivated fields.

The archipelago is known within Chile for its distinctive folklore, mythology, potatoes, cuisine and unique architecture. The culture of Chiloé is the result of mixing of Huilliche, Spanish and Chono influences in centuries of isolation without much contact with the rest of Chile or the Western World. Its cool temperate climate, abundance of sea resources and large and lush forests have also played a major role in shaping life in the islands.

In colonial times, Chiloé was an important bulwark in the defence against Dutch and British incursions to Chile and Patagonia. The archipelago was the last Spanish possession in Chile, successfully repelling patriot invasions until 1826. In the 19th century, the archipelago was a starting point for the Chilean colonisation of Patagonia. Not only were major expeditions assembled in Chiloé, but thousands of Chilotes migrated to the sparsely populated mainland to work in sheep-raising estancias, as railway navvies, or to become independent settlers. Belief in witchcraft has been common in the archipelago, reaching such influence that in 1880 Chilean authorities put on trial warlocks said to rule the archipelago through a secret society.

Once considered an isolated and backward part of Chile, today the archipelago retains its rural character despite increased connectivity and the growth of cities such as Ancud, Castro and Quellón. Since the 1990s, salmon aquaculture and tourism have been important sources of revenue in the archipelago, complementing traditional activities such as fishing and small-scale agriculture.

== Geography ==
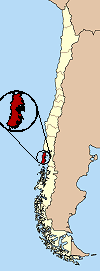
Location within Chile

The Chiloé Province (Spanish: Provincia de Chiloé) includes all of the Chiloé Archipelago, except the Desertores Islands, plus the Guafo Island, for a total land area of approximately 9,181 square kilometres (3,545 square miles). The administrative center of the province is the city of Castro, while the episcopal see of the Roman Catholic bishopric is Ancud. The province of Chiloé is part of the Los Lagos Region (Región de los Lagos), which primarily consists of the Chilean lakes region on the mainland north of Chiloé; the administrative center of the region is Puerto Montt.

Chiloé Island is by far the largest island in the archipelago, at 8,394 square kilometres (3,241 square miles). It is roughly rectangular, with its long axis oriented from north to south. To the east of Chiloé Island lies the Sea of Chiloé, which contains most of the other islands in the archipelago. The Sea of Chiloé is a marginal sea separating Chiloé Island from Palena Province (also called Continental Chiloé). The main islands in the Sea of Chiloé are Quinchao, Lemuy, Tranqui, and Desertores Islands. To the northeast and southeast of the archipelago lie the Gulf of Ancud and the Gulf of Corcovado; the former is part of the Sea of Chiloé. Some 40 kilometres (25 miles) southwest of Chiloé Island lies Guafo Island, the southernmost island of the archipelago.

Chiloé Island is separated from the Chilean mainland by the 2-kilometre-wide (1.2-mile) Chacao Channel in the north. Most of the good harbors are located on the island's northern and eastern shores. The eastern shore is marked by a series of peninsulas and inlets, notably Estero de Castro where the capital, Castro, is located. The western part of Chiloé Island, as well as the whole of Guafo Island, is hilly and covered by forests. The hills are subdivided into two north–south ranges, Piuchén and Pirulil, separated by the lakes Cucao and Huillinco. They contain the highest points in the archipelago and do not exceed 800 metres (2,600 feet). Depressions in the western forest are occupied by numerous small lakes and bogs scattered across the landscape.

A bridge to the mainland is planned for the archipelago, despite opposition from some residents who fear pollution and habitat destruction. The Chacao Channel bridge would replace the ferry that connects the village of Chacao, Ancud Comuna, on Route 5 at the northern end of Chiloé Island, across the Chacao Channel with the village of Pargua, Calbuco Comuna, on the mainland.

=== Hydrography ===
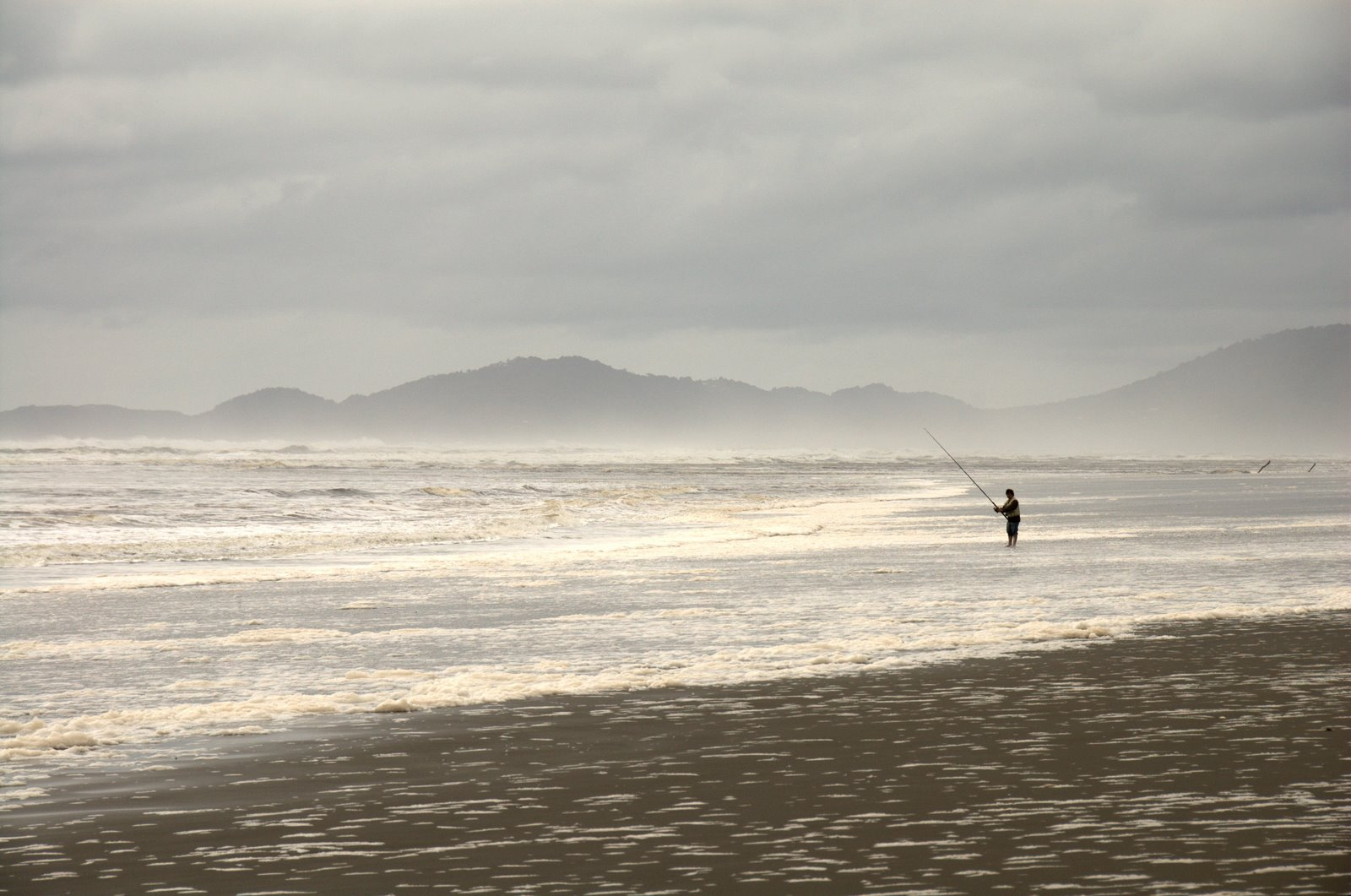
A fisherman on Mar Brava beach, on the Pacific Ocean coast

Chiloé Island has 56 hydrographic basins, fed by the rains that fall on the Coastal Range. On the other islands, watercourses are scarce and mostly come from underground aquifers, although some also drain from lakes and lagoons. The longest and most voluminous rivers are the Medina and the Chepu, both of which flow into the Pacific Ocean. Other important rivers are the Pudeto and the Butalcura. Due to their ecological importance, the wetlands of the Chepu basin were declared a Nature Sanctuary by the Council of Ministers for Sustainability in 2020.

The largest lake is Huillinco-Cucao, which is the union of two small lakes formed by advancing glaciers, and there are also around 200 other lakes and lagoons.

== Flora and fauna ==
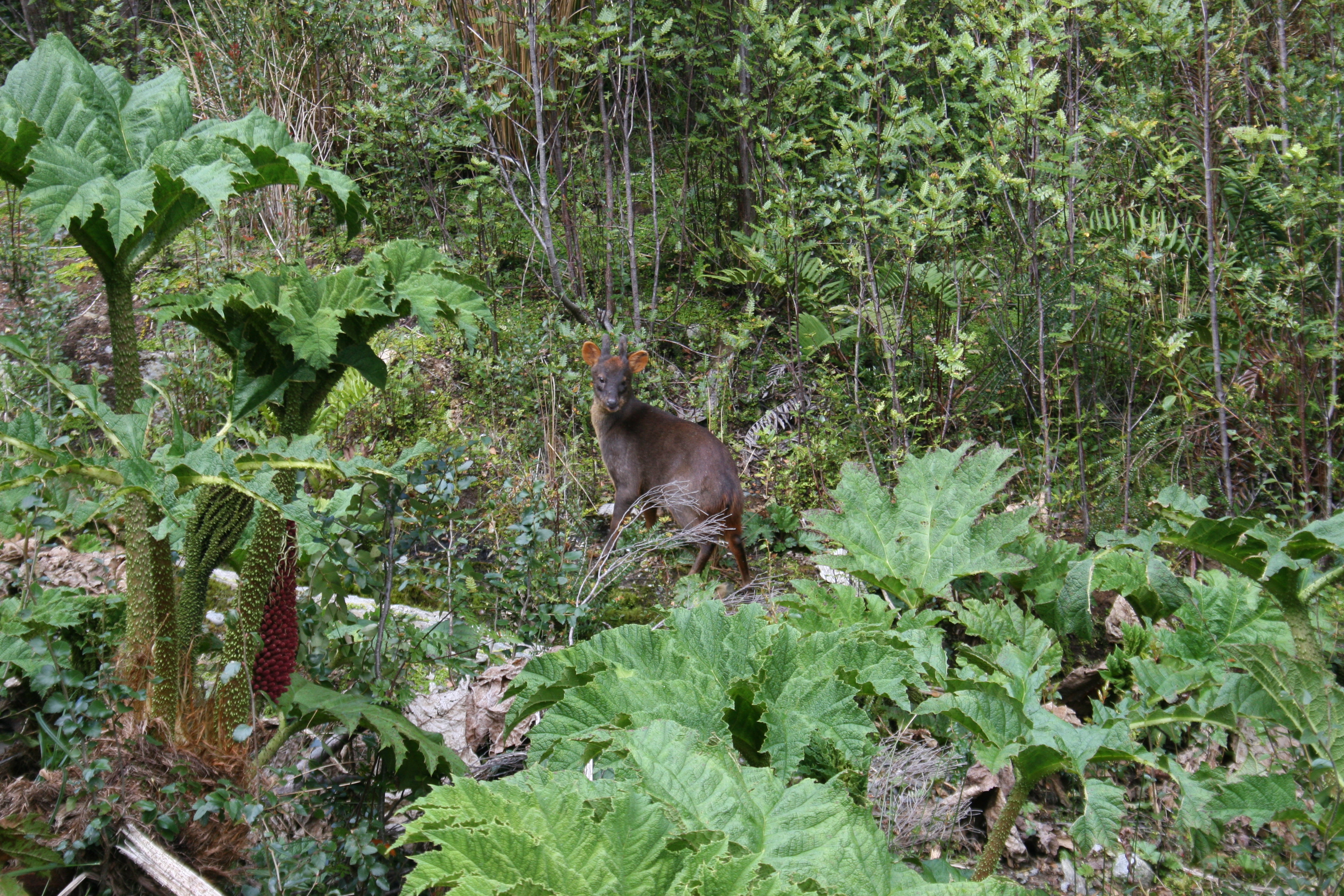
A southern pudú, one of smallest deer in the world, amongst Chilean rhubarb on Isla San Pedro.

The archipelago's original vegetation is Valdivian temperate rainforest, a forest with a very dense understory and a large diversity of plant species, including many mosses and ferns. The western and southern portions of the island are still largely covered by the native forest. Notable species include arrayán (Luma apiculata), coihue (Nothofagus dombeyi), quila (Chusquea quila), Chilean rhubarb, and the avellano (Gevuina avellana). Fitzroya cupressoides and tepú (Tepualia stipularis) grow in the poorly drained soils of the Piuchén and Pirulil ranges. Before the end of the Llanquihue glaciation, the southern parts of Chiloé Island constituted open landscapes. This changed around 12,500 years ago when the climate became warmer and forests colonized the region. The upper portions of Cordillera del Piuchén, locally known as la Campaña, have a Magellanic moorland vegetation.

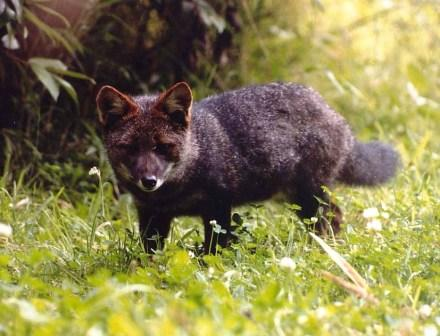
Darwin's fox (Lycalopex fulvipes) is endemic to the southern portion of the Chilean Coast Range.

The arrival of agriculture in pre-Hispanic times was the origin of the patchy landscape of pastures and farms that now dominates the eastern and northern coast of Chiloé Island. Some native plants like Gevuina avellana and Fascicularia bicolor have edible seeds, and others like the Chilean rhubarb have edible stems. The most notable edible plant native to Chiloé is the potato (Solanum tuberosum), which contrary to the Andean potatoes of Peru and Bolivia is adapted to the long-day conditions prevalent in the higher latitudes of southern Chile. Hundreds of varieties of this potato have been cultivated by local indigenous peoples since before the Spanish conquest, and historical and molecular evidence suggests that it is the progenitor of the world's most widely cultivated variety of potato, S. tuberosum tuberosum.

The native fauna includes many birds, a few subspecies of which are endemic to the archipelago. Among land mammals, the largest are Darwin's fox (named as such because Charles Darwin was the first to collect a specimen, on Isla San Pedro, Chiloé) and the pudú, a small deer. Marine mammals include Commerson's dolphins and South American sea lions, which form colonies at rock outcrops close to the sea. Several species of whale have been sighted around the island, notably blue whales (see also Alfaguara project) and critically endangered southern right whales.

== History ==
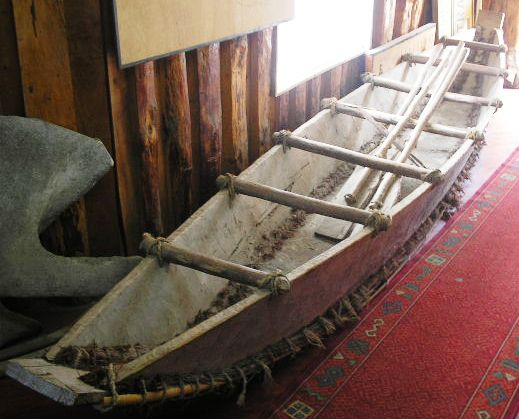
Reconstruction of a dalca, a type of boat used by Chonos, Huilliches and Spaniards living in Chiloé

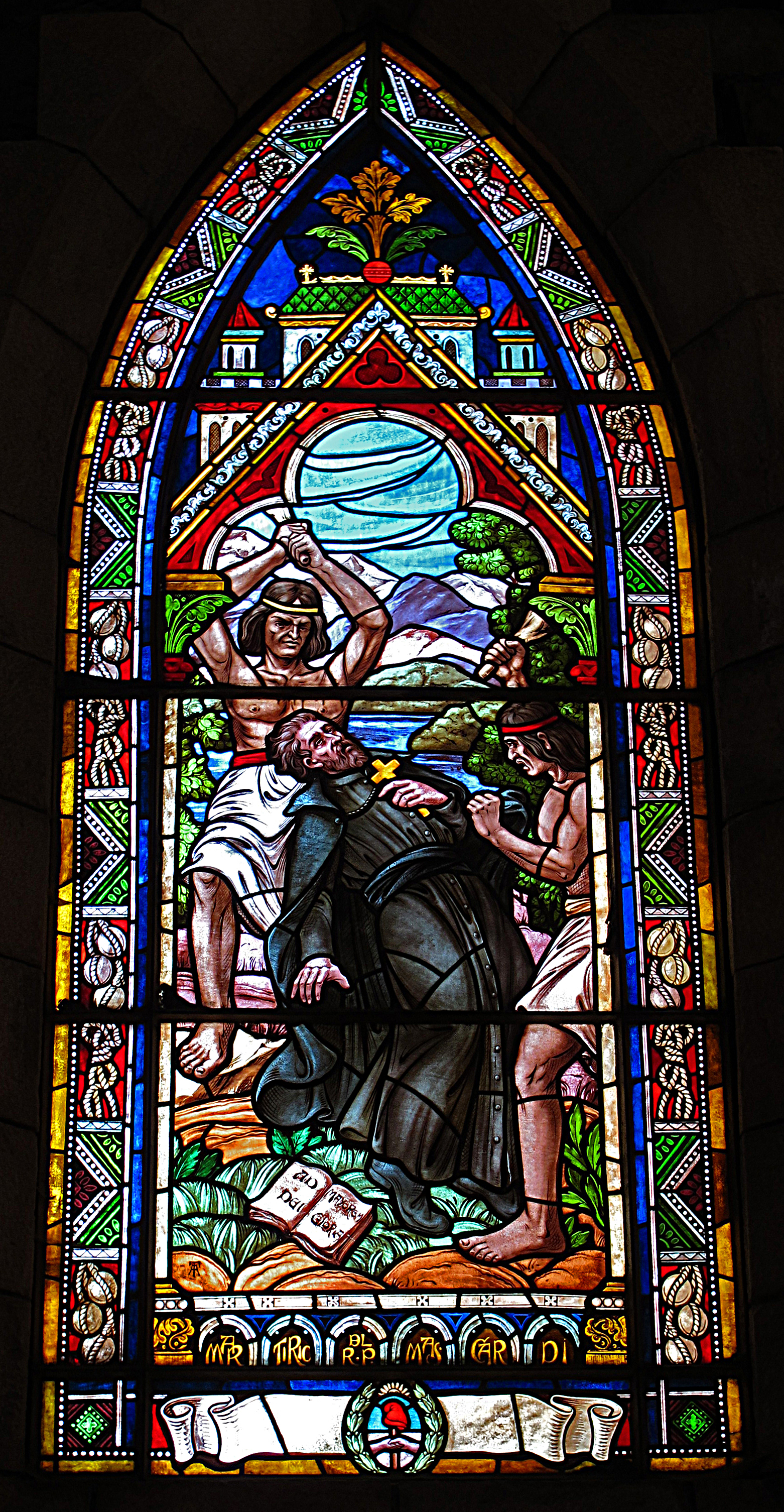
Nicolás Mascardi, shown here in the Cathedral of Bariloche, was among the Jesuits who used Chiloé as a starting point for exploration and missionary activity around Nahuel Huapi Lake

=== Pre-Hispanic period ===
The Chiloé Archipelago may have been populated as early as 12,000 to 11,800 BC, according to archaeological discoveries in Monte Verde, located less than 50 kilometres (31 miles) north of the main island. Chiloé's first ethnically identifiable inhabitants are believed to be the Chonos, a seafaring nomadic people. This has led to the assumption that Chonos were the people who left behind most of the abundant shell middens (chonchales) of the Chiloé Archipelago, yet this claim is unverified.

There are various placenames in the Chiloé Archipelago with Chono etymologies, despite the main indigenous language of the archipelago at the arrival of the Spanish being Huilliche. A theory postulated by chronicler José Pérez García holds that the Cuncos settled in Chiloé Island in Pre-Hispanic times as consequence of a push from more northern Huilliches, who in turn were being displaced by Mapuches. Cuncos, Huilliches and Mapuches all belong to the wider Mapuche macro-ethnicity.

The Cuncos, who were a coastal people, arrived from the mainland north of Chiloé and settled on the eastern shore of the Isla Grande, practicing horticulture and fishing. Some accounts mention the northern half of the Chiloé Island as Cunco territory.

It can be said that Chiloé was a contact zone between the Mapuche (Araucanian) world and the southern tribes.

=== Spanish colony (1567–1826) ===
The main island was first discovered by Spaniards in 1553 by Francisco de Ulloa. In 1567, the island was conquered for Spain by Captain Martín Ruiz de Gamboa, who was at the head of an expedition of 110 Spaniards. Gamboa named the islands Nueva Galicia (New Galicia) in honor of the place of origin of Rodrigo de Quiroga who as governor had organized the expedition. Gamboa established a settlement at Castro in 1567, which later became the seat of a Jesuit mission and was capital of the province until the founding of Ancud in 1768.

In early colonial times, the Spanish introduced a number of Old World crops and agricultural systems. Some of these cultivars and systems ended with poor results, yet the introduction of pigs and apple trees proved a success. Pigs benefited from abundant shellfish and algae exposed by the large tides. Wheat came to be grown in lesser quantities compared to the native potatoes, given the adverse climate.

During the first years of the colony, the spiritual labour was carried out by Mercedarians and Franciscans. The first Jesuits arrived in 1608 and founded in 1612 the first church in Castro. Because of the scattered population living in different islands, the Jesuits established a circular mission system with numerous chapels and churches. The priests of the circular mission travelled from September to May to the scattered missions using dalcas. The Jesuits established a collegium in 1660 in Castro. By 1767, when the Society of Jesus was suppressed, there were 13 Jesuit missioners and 79 chapels. From 1771 onwards, the Franciscans took over the functions of the Jesuits in Chiloé.

As result of a corsair and pirate menace, Spanish authorities ordered to depopulate the Guaitecas Archipelago south of Chiloé, to deprive enemies of any eventual support from native populations. This was in line with the ideas of Governor Antonio Narciso de Santa María, who thought the Spanish should concentrate efforts in defending Chiloé Island. Depopulation of Guaitecas Archipelago meant the indigenous Chono population settled in the Chiloé Archipelago, where they became gradually assimilated.

Ancud was made capital of the Chiloé in 1767. In 1784, Chiloé Island was made a direct dependency of the colonial viceroyalty of Peru as a consequence of the Bourbon reforms, while continental Chile was a captaincy-general within the viceroyalty. The change of capital and shift to dependency corresponded to a new strategic view of the Chiloé Archipelago. While initially Chiloé was viewed by Spaniards as a colony rich enough to conquer, it later became a problematic region due to its geographical isolation from mainland Chile and the War of Arauco in the mainland. Chiloé Island was largely exempt from the turmoil that affected the Chilean mainland due to conflicts with Huilliches and Mapuches, but was notably affected in 1712 by a large Huilliche rebellion.

During colonial times, Chiloé served as base for a series of explorations towards the interior of Patagonia as well as to its channels. The Jesuit Nicolás Mascardi crossed the Andes through the Vuriloche Pass and set up a mission on the shores of Nahuel Huapi Lake in 1670. The Jesuits established in Chiloé brought Chonos from islands south of Chiloé to settle in the archipelago, which led to acculturation with the Spanish-Huilliche of the island.

==== Royalist stronghold (1812–1826) ====
Territories controlled by Chile and the Viceroyalty of Perú after the Battle of Chacabuco of 1817. Chiloé and Valdivia were enclaves accessible only by sea.

Unlike the central region of Chile where a long war of independence resumed after a Spanish reoccupation, Chiloé never joined the Patria Vieja (Old Republic), and rather than conspiring to overthrow the local Spanish administration, its population gave Spain wide support. From 1812 on, men from Chiloé would be enlisted as soldiers and sent to fight in Chile, Bolivia and Peru for the royalist cause. In December 1817, the island became the last stronghold of Spanish royalists (together with Valdivia) fleeing from the Chilean mainland. A Chilean expedition led by Thomas Cochrane, 10th Earl of Dundonald disembarked 60 men under command of William Miller but failed to conquer it after the small but disastrous Battle of Agüi. Another unsuccessful conquest attempt occurred in 1824, when Jorge Beauchef, who had disembarked in Chiloé Island, was ambushed at the Battle of Mocopulli. Only on 15 January 1826 did the Royalist forces of Antonio de Quintanilla negotiate a surrender to a new military expedition led by Ramon Freire, and the island was fully incorporated into the independent Republic of Chile, although Spain did not recognize Chile until 1844.

The last Spanish military governors were:

- Mariano Osorio December 1817 – 1818
- Antonio de Quintanilla 1818 – 15 January 1826

=== Chilean republic (1826 onward) ===
Charles Darwin arrived in Chiloé on 28 June 1834 and was based there for six months, writing about his impressions of southern Chile in his diaries. The archipelago had been an old royalist stronghold, and its inhabitants were known during the 19th century for complaining about not having a king. Darwin wrote of Chiloé in 1834: "The Indians ended all their complaints by saying, 'And it is only because we are poor Indians, and know nothing; but it was not so when we had a King.'"

As Chiloé had been a defensive stronghold during colonial times, the Republic of Chile used Chiloé as a starting point for its territorial expansion into the southern territories. The expedition to the Straits of Magellan, that founded Fuerte Bulnes in 1843, was assembled in Chiloé. In the 1850s, Chiloé was again instrumental in the logistical support of the colonization of the Llanquihue Lake, where German settlers were given land. The last major portion of Patagonia to be incorporated into Chile, Aysén was also explored and settled from Chiloé. In the colonization process of Patagonia, Chilotes immigrants constituted a large part of the work force of the livestock enterprises that were established in Patagonia between 1890 and 1950.

During the 19th and early 20th centuries, thousands of Chilotes migrated to the mainland, taking up work as railway navvies in southern Chile or in husbandry operations owned by Chileans in Argentine Patagonia. Some Chiloes also established themselves as independent settlers, as was the case of many in Valle Manso, Río Negro Territory.

During the late 19th century and the beginning of the 20th century, Chiloé lost economic and political importance to Puerto Montt on the mainland, so that by 1863 Puerto Montt was made capital of its own province, and, in 1927, the Chiloé Archipelago was incorporated into a new province headed by Puerto Montt.

The cathedral in Ancud was destroyed and Castro was badly damaged by the Great Chilean earthquake of 1960, the most powerful ever recorded. In 1982, the provincial capital, after over 20 years, was returned to Castro.

Since the 1980s, the economy of Chiloé has become increasingly dependent on large-scale commercial fishing ventures, aquaculture (salmon farming in particular), and, more recently, tourism. The rapid industrialization of the region, triggered by Chile's adoption of a neoliberal economic model under the Pinochet dictatorship in the 1970s, has led to a major demographic shift of the island's population, from majority rural in the 1980s to more than 60% urban in 2012.

== Culture ==
In part because of its physical isolation from the rest of Chile, Chiloé has a special architecture and local culture. During the colonization of Patagonia and southern Chile in the 19th century, cultural elements of Chiloé spread to that zone, as many chilotes migrated and settled there.

=== Architecture ===
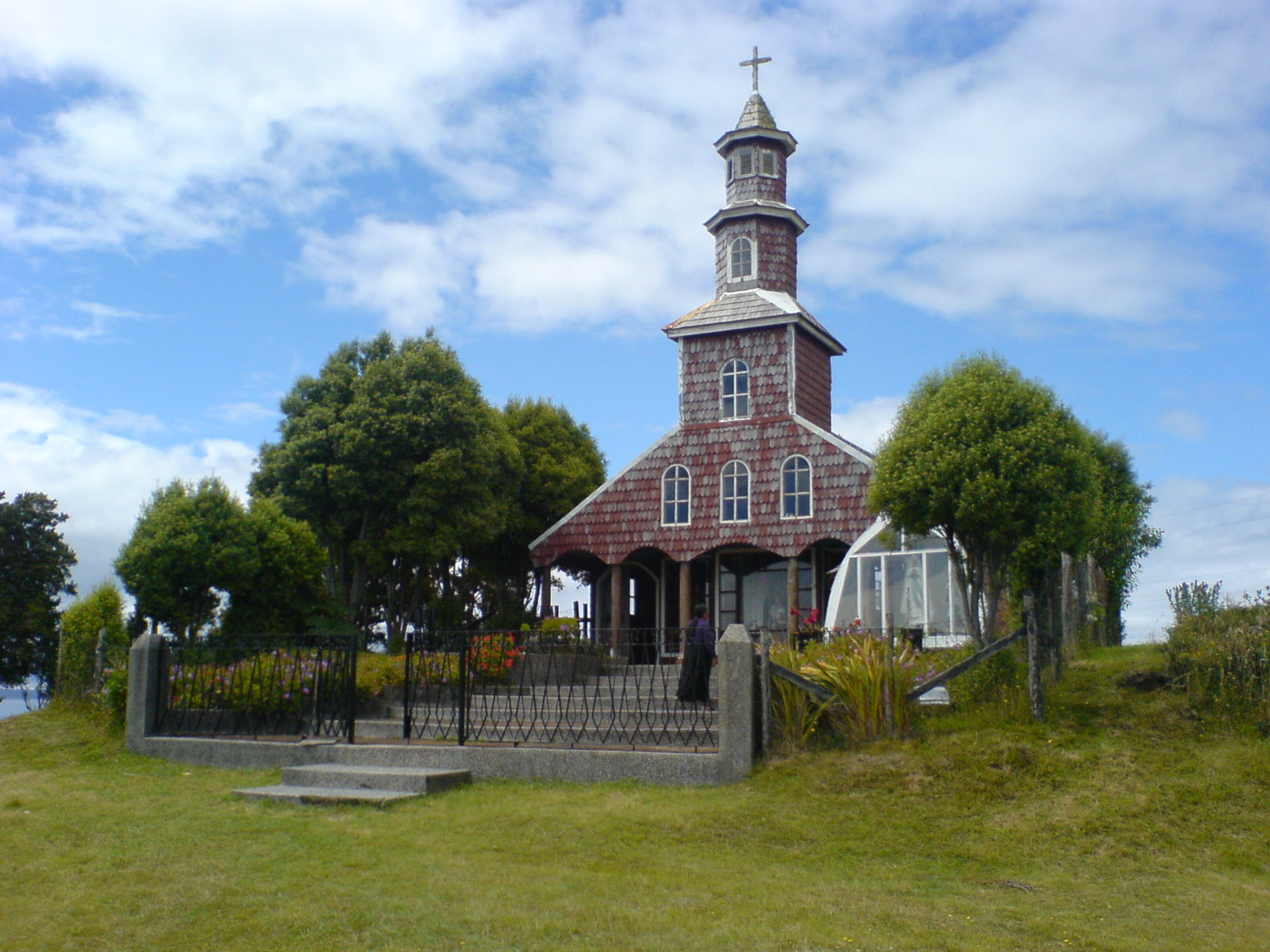
This church near Chacao bears evidence of baroque and neoclassical elements introduced by clergy in colonial times.

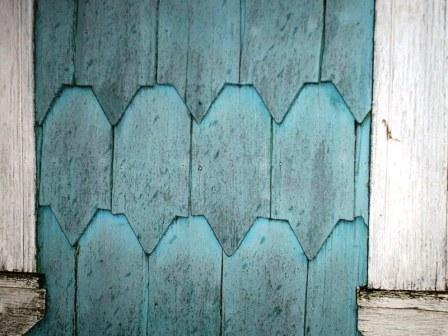
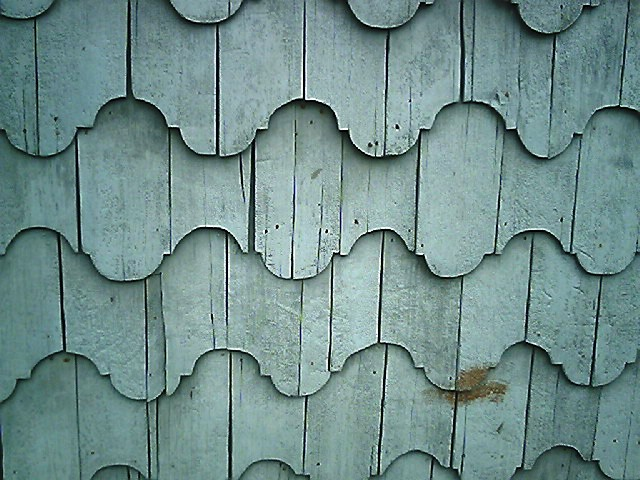
In Chiloé architecture wood shingles are common and can be cut in several forms.

Chilotan architecture is a unique architectural style that is mainly restricted to Chiloe Island and nearby areas. In part because of its physical isolation from the rest of Chile, and access to different materials, Chiloé has a special architecture that differs most greatly from the typical Spanish colonial architecture. The Spanish who arrived in the 16th century, and Jesuit missionaries who followed, constructed hundreds of small wooden churches in an attempt to bring Christianity to a pagan land; the result was a mixing of Catholicism and pagan beliefs. In addition, the use of flat wooden tiles as shingles (wood shingles) became a staple in its architecture. Sixteen of these Churches of Chiloé still remain and have been designated UNESCO World Heritage Sites.

Nearly all the houses and buildings in colonial Chiloe were built with wood, and wood shingles were extensively employed. Roof shingles of Fitzroya came to be used as money and called Real de alerce. In the late 19th century, many palafitos (stilt houses) were built in cities like Castro and Chonchi.

Homes and hotels in the region also employ the use of wood shingles, usually painted in bright, bold colors. Depending on the region, palafitos are another distinct architecture feature of Chiloé. These are traditional fisherman's houses built on wooden stilts.

=== Chilote Spanish ===
Chilote is a dialect of Spanish language spoken in the Chiloé Archipelago. It has distinct differences from standard Chilean Spanish in accent, pronunciation, grammar and vocabulary, especially influenced by the Huilliche variant of Mapudungun.

=== Cuisine ===
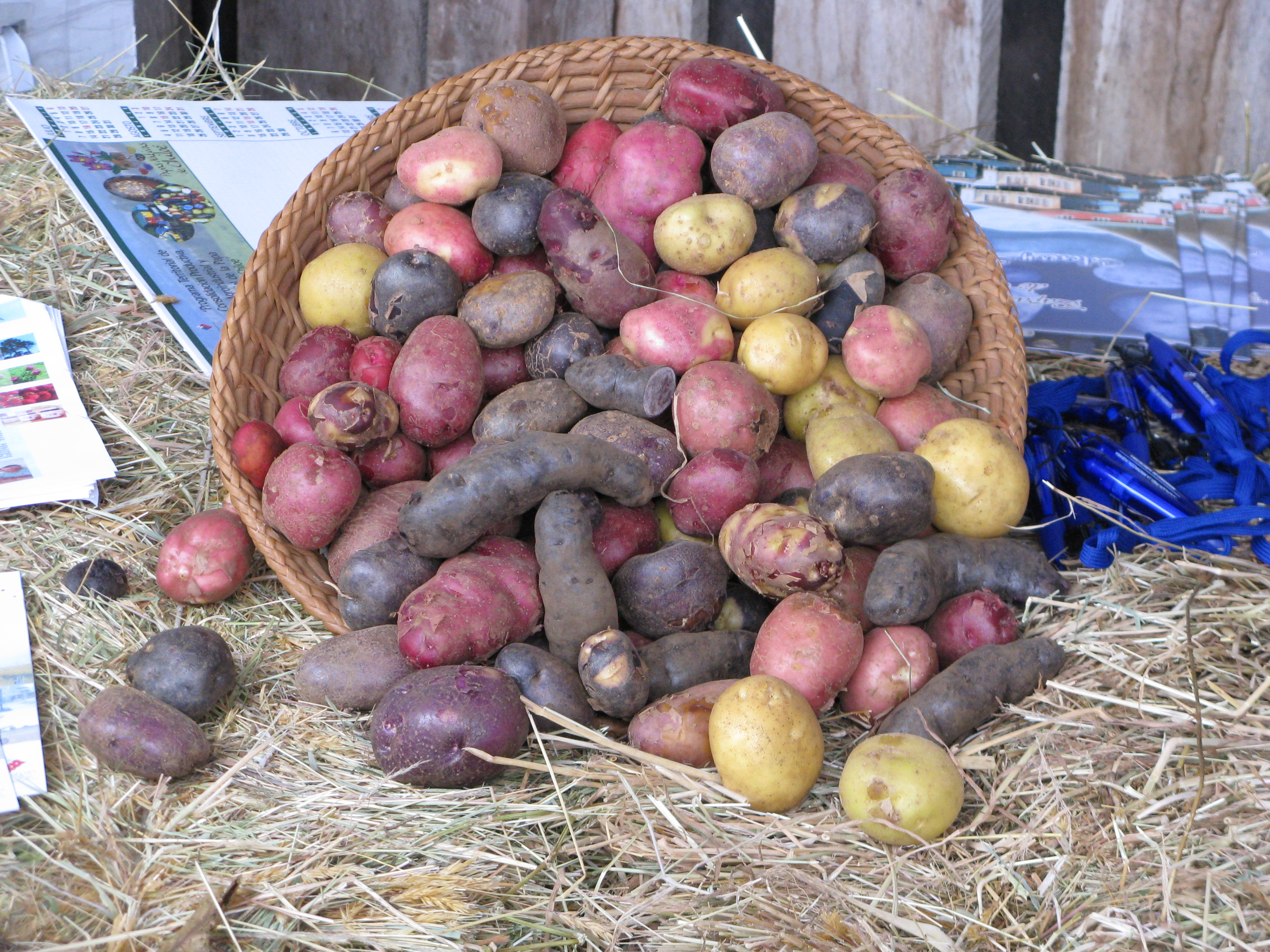
Chiloé is a center of diversity of potatoes.

The cuisine of Chiloé has its origin in pre-Hispanic traditions among native Chonos and Huilliches. Typical features of Chilote cuisine include earth oven and asado barbecues. Chilote cuisine makes extensive use of fish, shellfish and potatoes, of which there are plenty of varieties growing in the archipelago's different islands. Chiloé is a center of diversity of potatoes and the origin of most of cultivated potatoes outside Andes, belonging to subspecies Solanum tuberosum tuberosum. Lamb is considered the most appreciated meat and is eaten and prepared as an asado, especially around Christmas and New Year. Apple chicha (cider) is a common alcoholic beverage. Other typical alcoholic beverages are murtado and licor de oro liqueurs.

Traditional cuisine includes curanto and pulmay. Curanto is a dish made from fish, clams (almejas), ribbed mussels (cholgas), giant barnacles (picorocos), meats, and potatoes of Chiloé wrapped in leaves and cooked in a hole in the ground by hot stones. It can also be cooked in a pot over a bonfire, becoming pulmay.

=== Mythology ===
Chiloé has a rich folklore, with many mythological animals and spirits such as the Caleuche, the Trauco, the Pincoya and the Invunche. Chilota mythology is based on a mixture of indigenous religions, (the Chonos and Huilliches), that live in the Archipelago of Chiloé, and the legends and superstitions brought by the Spanish Conquistadores. In 1567, the process of conquest in Chiloé by the conquistadors brought forth the fusion of elements that would form a separate mythology. Chilota mythology flourished, isolated from other beliefs and myths in mainland Chile, due to the separation of the archipelago from the rest of the Spanish occupation in Chile, and the Mapuches occupation or destruction of all the Spanish settlements between the Bío-Bío River and the Chacao channel following the disaster of Curalaba in 1598.

According to Chilotan mythology, the origin of the archipelago lies in a fierce battle between two serpents, Ten Ten-Vilu (ten, "earth", vilu, "snake") and Coi Coi-Vilu (Co, "water", vilu, "snake").

== Demographics ==
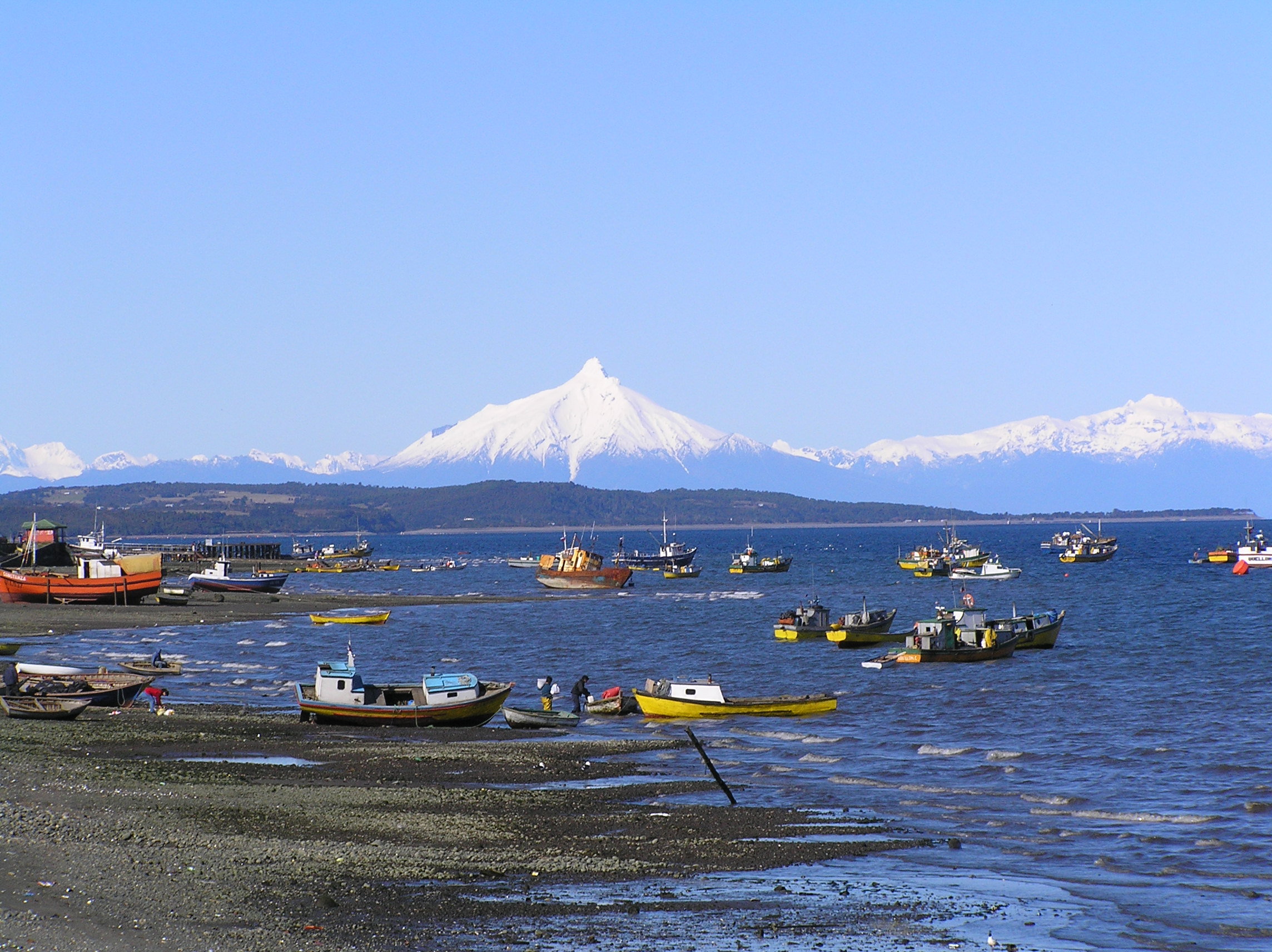
Fishing boats in Quellón. Corcovado Volcano in the background.

The population of the province according to the 2024 census was 176,865; of this, 44% lived in rural areas, according to the National Statistics Institute (INE). Chiloé's people are known as Chilotes.

The population descends mainly from the mixture of natives (Huilliches, Cuncos, Payos and Chonos) and the Spanish, with later contributions of Chileans from other regions and a few Europeans (e.g., Germans and Croats). During the colonial era, Indian towns (Queilen, Chonchi, Tenaún), Spanish towns (Chacao and Quenac) and other mixed towns (Castro, Dalcahue, etc.) were all peresent.

== Economy ==
Salmon aquaculture, tourism, agriculture and timber are the mainstays of the island economy. Some 1,400 salmon farms are spread among the islands.

=== Tourism ===
LAN Airlines constructed a small airport in November 2012, which opened Chiloé to more tourism than it had experienced. Before the airport opened in Castro, the only way to reach the islands was by ferry. Main cultural attractions include the islands' local culture, coastline, and clear waters. Some of the islands' churches are UNESCO World Heritage sites; however, not all of them are always accessible to the public.

In order to overcome the cultural and organizational barriers that keep suppliers of living cultural heritage and tour operators apart, the Chiloé diocese of Ancud established a private foundation called "Fundación con Todos" (One for All Foundation). The foundation helps repair damaged churches on the islands and assists local residents in developing tourism.

In cooperation with the EOMF and the Chiloé Model Forest, a cultural and natural heritage tour was organized to Argentina and Chile, including a three-day visit to Chiloé, permitting some of the Chilote households to host a group of cultural heritage tourists for the first time. The visits were successful and should be the first of more to come, helping establish the credibility of Chiloé's agrotourism network among other tour operators.

== Toponymy ==
Chiloé is derived from the Mapuche word chillwe, meaning "seagull place". Chill or chülle refers to the brown-hooded gull, and the -we suffix means 'place'. The adjective and demonym for this region is chilote in the masculine and chilota in the feminine.

Many placenames across the archipelago have Chono etymologies, despite Veliche being the main indigenous language at the Spanish arrival in the 16th century.

== See also ==
- Churches of Chiloé
- History of Chiloé
