= Ribbed mussel =

Ribbed mussel is a common name of:

- Aulacomya atra, a southern hemisphere mussel species
- Geukensia demissa, a North American mussel species
