= Desertores Islands =

Group of islands in the Sea of Chiloé, Los Lagos Region, Chile

Native name: Islas Desertores
- Desertores Islands, between Chiloé and Palena

Geography
- Coordinates: 42.700779°S 73.020813°W
- Adjacent to: Pacific Ocean
- Major islands: Auten, Chuit, Chulin, Imerquiña, Nayahue, Talcan

Administration
- Chile
- Region: Los Lagos
- Province: Palena
- Commune: Chaitén

Additional information
- NGA UFI -879525

Desertores Islands are a group of islands in the Sea of Chiloé, between Chiloé Island and the mainland of Chile. They are the easternmost islands of the Chiloé Archipelago, and are administered as part of the Chaitén commune, in the Palena Province, unlike the rest of the Archipelago, which forms Chiloé Province. The six main islands are Auten, Chuit, Chulin, Imerquiña, Nayahue and Talcan, with Talcan, the biggest and easternmost of the Desertores Islands, close to the mainland. There are several smaller islands in the archipelago. The islands are home to small, isolated communities that rely primarily on fishing and subsistence agriculture.

== Geography ==
Desertores Islands are a group of islands in the Sea of Chiloé, between Chiloé Island and the mainland of Chile, forming a maritime buffer between the Gulf of Ancud and the Gulf of Corcovado. They are the easternmost islands of the Chiloé Archipelago geographically, but are administered as part of the Chaitén commune, in the Palena Province, unlike the rest of the Archipelago, which forms Chiloé Province.

The six main islands are Auten, Chuit, Chulin, Imerquiña, Nayahue and Talcan. Talcan, spanning 44.986 km^{2} (17.369 sq mi) is the biggest and easternmost of the Desertores Islands, close to the mainland. The terrain is made up primarily of coastal lowlands and forested plains covered by evergreen forests, typical of southern Chile’s rainforests. The islands are characterized by small hills, coastal cliffs, and inlets suitable for artisanal fishing and seaweed harvesting. Various distinct vegetation zones occur such as sandy beaches, grasslands, and rocky areas. The islands have a temperate climate with warm summers and ample rainfall. The islands are home to a number of species, and the government of Chile has announced preliminary work on Marine Protected Areas near the Desertores archipelago to safeguard fisheries and preserve marine habitats.

== Demographics and economy ==
The islands are sparsely populated with primary economic activities including fishing and subsistence farming. Historically isolated, the islands remained marginal in government planning until recent initiatives began providing state services to islands like Nayahué and Auten in 2022. These missions aim to reach remote communities with health, judicial, and civil services directly in their localities. There are no permanent road connections, and all travel is by maritime transport links the islands to Chiloé Island and to Chaitén on the mainland. Some islands like Talcan have an aerodrome, but do not have regular commercial flights.
