= Queilén =

- Town and Commune
- Location of Queilén commune in Los Lagos Region Location in Chile
- Coordinates: 42°37′19″S 73°46′27″W
- Country: Chile
- Region: Los Lagos
- Province: Chiloé
- Founded: 1778

Government
  - Type: Municipality
  - Alcalde: Manuel Godoy Velásquez (UDI)

Area
  - Total: 223.9 km^{2} (86.4 sq mi)
- Elevation: 26 m (85 ft)

Population (2012 Census)
  - Total: 5,164
  - Density: 23.06/km^{2} (59.74/sq mi)
  - Urban: 1,912
  - Rural: 3,226

Sex
  - Men: 2,663
  - Women: 2,475
- Time zone: UTC-4 (CLT)
  - Summer (DST): UTC-3 (CLST)
- Area code: 56 + 65
- Website: Municipality of Queilén

Queilén is a town and commune in Chiloé Province, in the Archipelago of Chiloé in southern Chile. It covers a portion of the southeast of the Greater Island of Chiloé, between the communes of Chonchi, Quellón, Tranqui Island and Acuy Island. For the 2002 census, the population of the town had grown to 1,912 inhabitants, according to INE; the municipality had a population of 5,138.

Its capital is the town of the same name, known on the island for its beaches and views of the Gulf of Corcovado and the Andes. It has a quieter atmosphere than the larger towns of the province (Ancud, Castro and Quellón). It was founded by Anthony Cipriano in the early nineteenth century.

This community has with the Public Library No. 333, which since 2002 joined the program Biblioredes services, allowing free access to Internet and technology services closer to all inhabitants from the community.

== History ==
The exact date of the foundation of Queilén is unknown. In 1703 there was an Arab community with a chapel and in 1771 a new church was built. Jesuit missionaries and Spanish settlers, granted encomiendas in the area, gradually occupied Queilén.

Between 1818 and 1821 the Spanish cavalry captain Antonio Cipriano, explored the coastline and drew up maps, preparing the population for military resistance to the expected Chilean landings. In 1890, in recognition of his accomplishments, the area was named after captain Grille. It seems that the community never accepted the name "Puerto Grille" and simply continued to use Queilén.

== Architecture ==
In 1867, Queilén was a little Chilote port with a church. Around 1924 it comprised a few houses, chapel, post office, customs, telegraph, civil registry and state schools. In 1937 a fire destroyed 15 houses, this, added to the isolation of the community, contributed to emigration towards Castro and Ancud. There was a gradual degeneration of the visual quality of the town, which is now being reversed by the incentive of tourism.

== Demographics ==
Historical population
Year	Pop.	±% p.a.
1875	2,181	—
1885	3,456	+4.71%
1895	4,404	+2.45%
1907	6,536	+3.34%
1920	13,957	+6.01%
1930	6,495	−7.36%
1940	6,514	+0.03%
1952	7,138	+0.77%
1970	4,341	−2.73%
1982	4,753	+0.76%
1992	4,952	+0.41%
2002	5,138	+0.37%
2017	5,385	+0.31%
2024	5,690	+0.79%
Source: "Censo de Población y Vivienda". National Statistics Institute.

According to the 2002 census of the National Statistics Institute, Queilén spans an area of 223.9 km^{2} (86 sq mi) and has 5,138 inhabitants (2,663 men and 2,475 women). Of these, 1,912 (37.2%) lived in urban areas and 3,226 (62.8%) in rural areas. The population grew by 3.8% (186 persons) between the 1992 and 2002 censuses.

== Services ==
Queilen city have basic services like hotel, cash dispenser, hospital, cultural center, museum, library, gas station, restaurants, supermarkets, telephone service, police office, aerodrome, port and pier.

== Administration ==
As a commune, Queilén is a third-level administrative division of Chile administered by a municipal council, headed by an alcalde who is directly elected every four years. The 2008-2012 alcalde is Carlos Gómez Miranda (PDC).

Within the electoral divisions of Chile, Queilén is represented in the Chamber of Deputies by Gabriel Ascencio (PDC) and Alejandro Santana (RN) as part of the 58th electoral district, (together with Castro, Ancud, Quemchi, Dalcahue, Curaco de Vélez, Quinchao, Puqueldón, Chonchi, Quellón, Chaitén, Hualaihué, Futaleufú and Palena). The commune is represented in the Senate by Camilo Escalona Medina (PS) and Carlos Kuschel Silva (RN) as part of the 17th senatorial constituency (Los Lagos Region).
