= Geukensia granosissima =

Scientific classification
- Kingdom: Animalia
- Phylum: Mollusca
- Class: Bivalvia
- Order: Mytilida
- Family: Mytilidae
- Genus: Geukensia
- Species: G. granosissima

Binomial name
- Geukensia granosissima (G.B. Sowerby III, 1914)

Species of bivalve

Geukensia granosissima, common name the southern ribbed mussel, is a species of saltwater mussel, a marine bivalve mollusk in the family Mytilidae, the mussels.

== Distribution ==
This species is native to the Atlantic coast of North America. Southern ribbed mussels are found in the Florida Keys, the Caribbean and the Gulf of Mexico. On the Atlantic coast to the north, the closely related ribbed mussel Geukensia demissa is found.

== Description ==
The ribbed shells of this species attain a length of 10 cm.
