= Tranqui Island =

Island in Los Lagos Region, Chile

Tranqui Island (Chiloe)
Native name: Isla Tranqui (de Chiloe)
- South east of Chiloé Island: Quellón, Chaullín, Acuy, Tranqui, Coldita, Cailin, Laitec, Queilén

Geography
- Coordinates: 42.961073°S 73.46826°W

Administration
- Chile
- Region: Los Ríos
- Province: Chiloé Province
- Commune: Queilén

Additional information
- NGA UFI=-903291

Tranqui is an island of the Chiloé Archipelago in southern Chile. It has three sectors: San Jose, Tranqui Nepué and Sentinel, all with small populations. A significant part of its forest still has not been touched by the subsistence agriculture which forms the bulk of the province's rural economy.
