= Acuy Island =

Native name: Isla Acuy
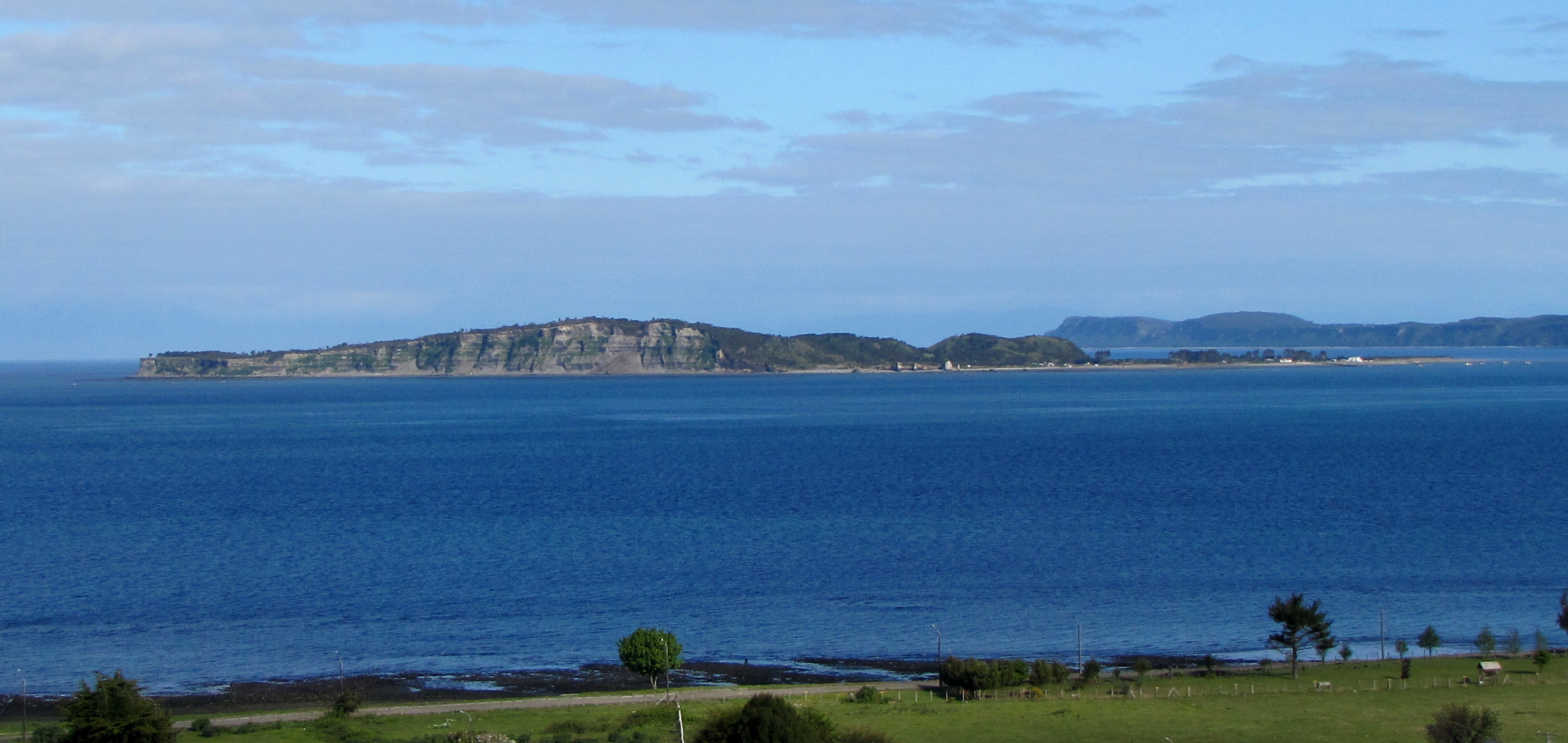

- South east of Chiloé Island: Quellón, Chaullín, Acuy, Tranqui, Coldita, Cailin, Laitec, Queilén

Geography
- Coordinates: 42.921411°S 73.428151°W
- Length: 2 km (1.2 mi)
- Width: 0.5 km (0.31 mi)

Administration
- Chile
- Region: Los Ríos
- Province: Chiloé Province
- Commune: Queilén

Demographics
- Population: 135

Additional information
- NGA UFI=-871214

Acuy is a small island southeast of the town of Queilén. It is about 2 kilometres (1.2 mi) long and 500 metres (1,600 ft) wide at its largest points, and therefore has only a small population.

The population is mainly devoted to fishing and gathering luga.

== See also ==
- List of islands of Chile
