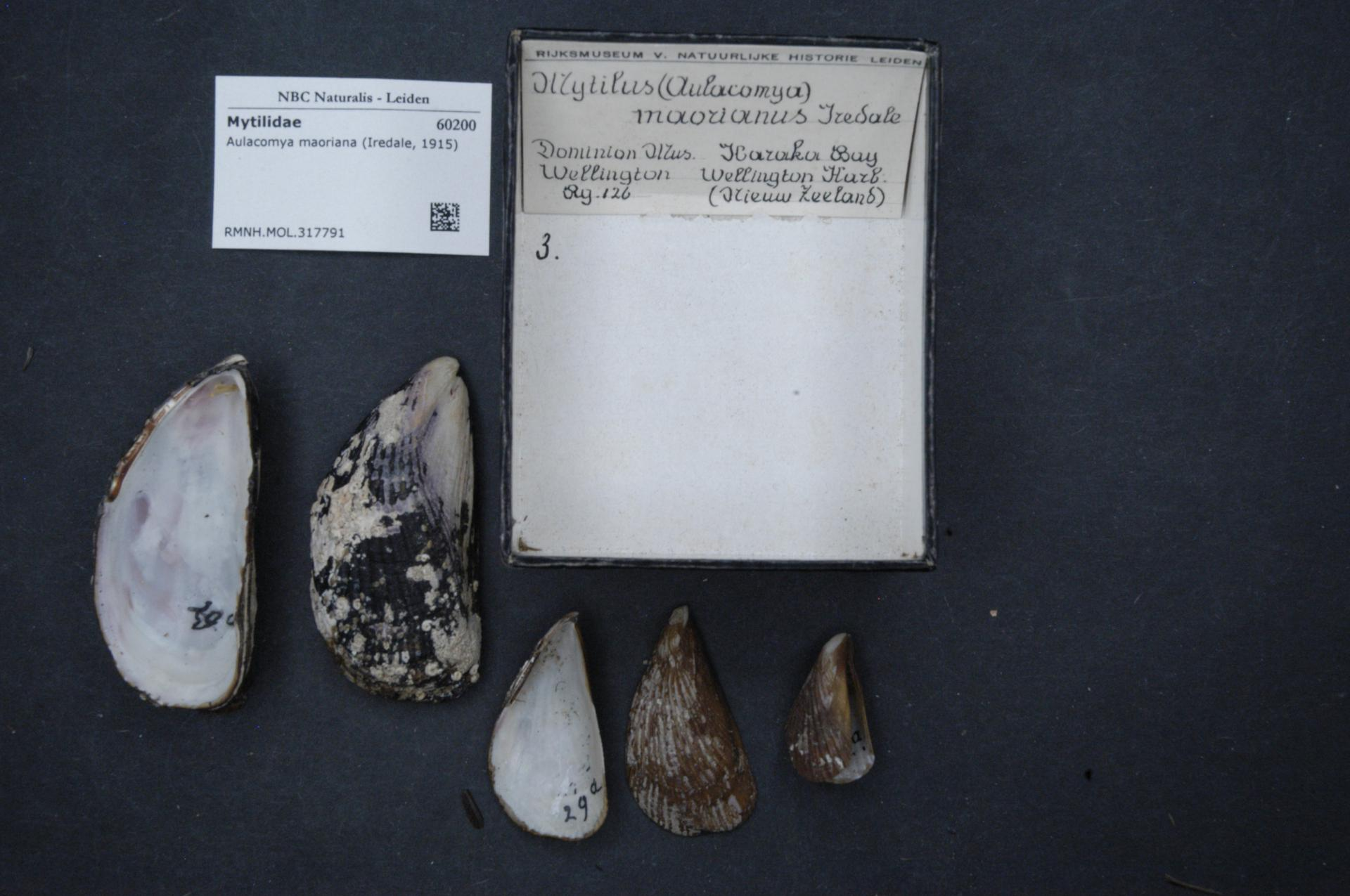

Scientific classification
- Kingdom: Animalia
- Phylum: Mollusca
- Class: Bivalvia
- Order: Mytilida
- Family: Mytilidae
- Genus: Aulacomya
- Species: A. maoriana

Binomial name
- Aulacomya maoriana (Iredale, 1915)

Synonyms
- Aulacomya ater maoriana (Iredale, 1915); Mytilus maorianus Iredale, 1915

= Aulacomya maoriana =

Species of bivalve

Aulacomya maoriana is a species of bivalve in the family Mytilidae. The scientific name of the species was first validly published in 1915 by Tom Iredale.
