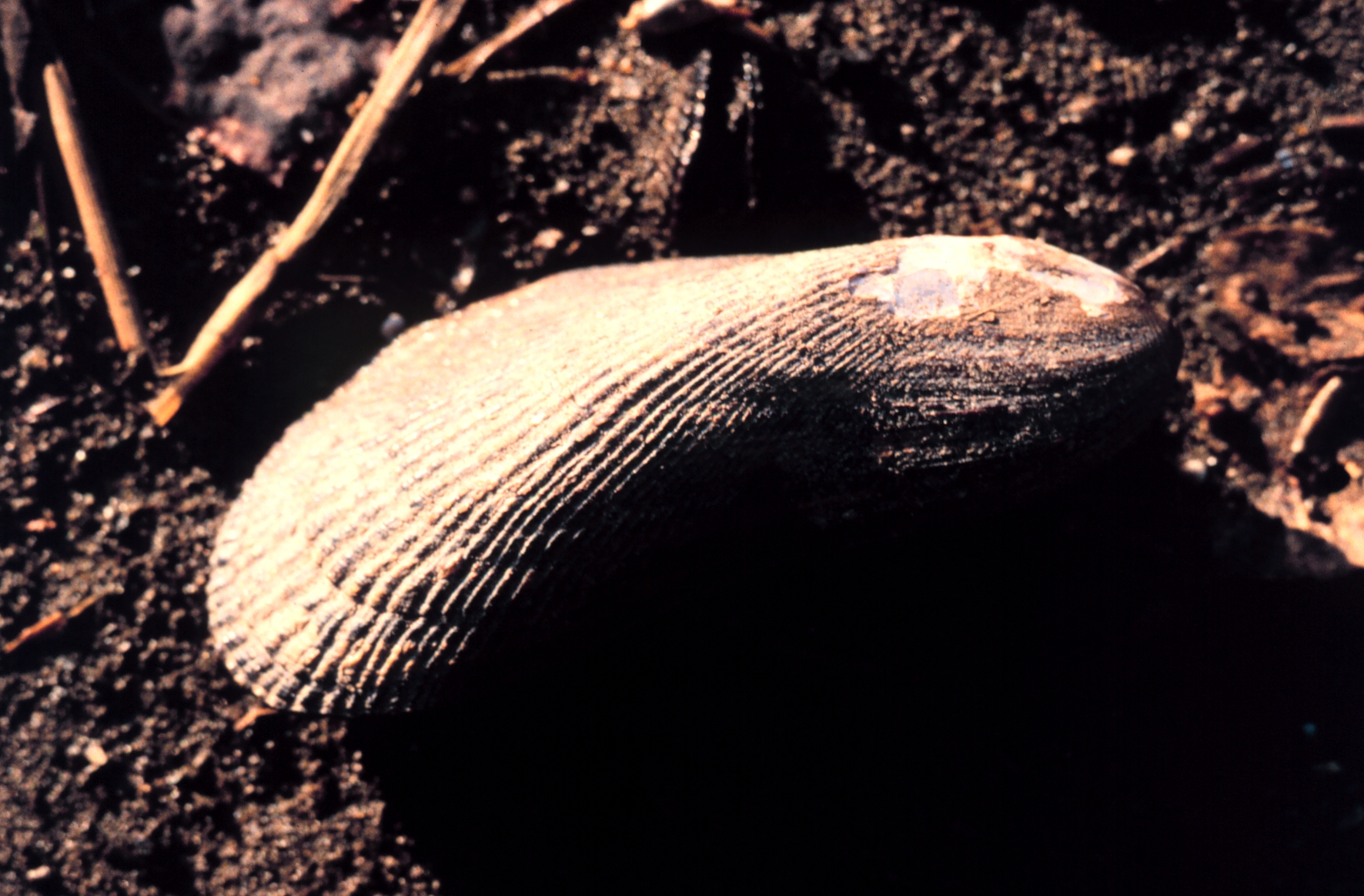

Scientific classification
- Domain: Eukaryota
- Kingdom: Animalia
- Phylum: Mollusca
- Class: Bivalvia
- Order: Mytilida
- Family: Mytilidae
- Genus: Geukensia; Van de Poel, 1959

= Geukensia =

Genus of bivalves

Geukensia is a genus of marine bivalve mollusc in the Mytilidae family, naturally found in the western Atlantic.

== Species ==
Species within the genus Geukensia include:

- Geukensia demissa (Dillwyn, 1817) - Ribbed mussel
- Geukensia granosissima (G. B. Sowerby III, 1914) - Southern ribbed mussel
