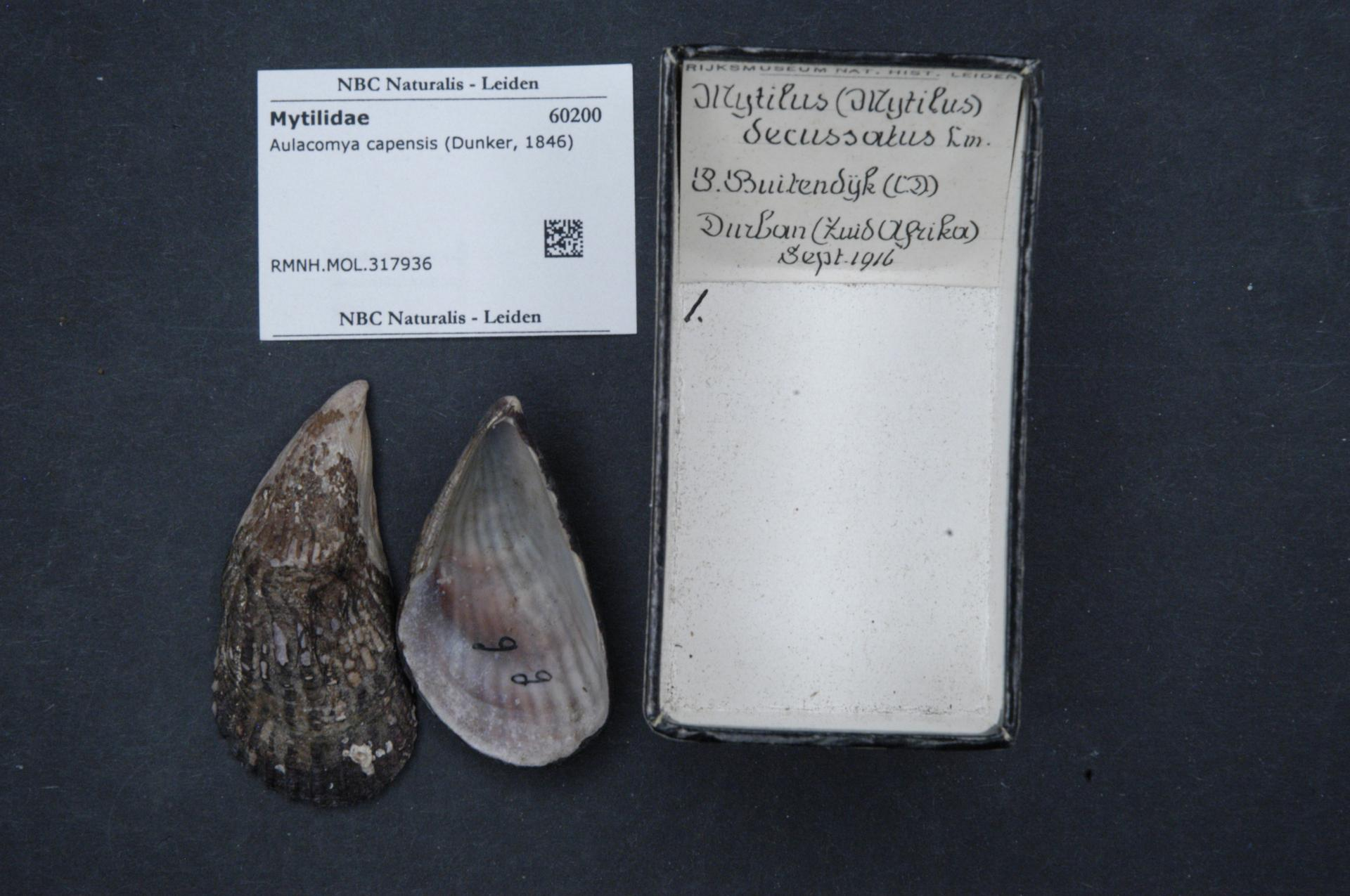

Scientific classification
- Kingdom: Animalia
- Phylum: Mollusca
- Class: Bivalvia
- Order: Mytilida
- Family: Mytilidae
- Genus: Aulacomya
- Species: A. capensis

Binomial name
- Aulacomya capensis (Dunker, 1846)

Synonyms
- Aulacomya atra capensis (Dunker, 1846); Mytilus capensis Dunker, 1846

= Aulacomya capensis =

Species of bivalve

Aulacomya capensis is a species of bivalve in the family Mytilidae. The scientific name of the species was first validly published in 1846 by Wilhelm Dunker.
