= Isla Talcan Airport =

- IATA: none; ICAO: SCIK

Summary
- Airport type: Public
- Serves: Isla Talcan
- Elevation AMSL: 45 ft / 14 m
- Coordinates: 42°44′40″S 72°58′00″W

Map
- Location of Isla Talcan Airport in Chile

Runways
Direction	Length		Surface
Direction	m	ft	Surface
17/35	757	2,484	Grass
- Source: Landings.com Google Maps GCM

Isla Talcan Airport (ICAO: SCIK) is an airstrip serving Isla Talcan, an island in the Gulf of Corcovado, in the Los Lagos Region of Chile.

The airstrip is on an isthmus connecting the east and west sections of the island. Approach and departure to either end of the runway are over the water.

The Chaiten VOR-DME (Ident: TEN) is 6.4 nautical miles (11.9 km) east-southeast of the airstrip.

== See also ==
- Transport in Chile
- List of airports in Chile
