= Aulacomya regia =

Scientific classification
- Kingdom: Animalia
- Phylum: Mollusca
- Class: Bivalvia
- Order: Mytilida
- Family: Mytilidae
- Genus: Aulacomya
- Species: A. regia

Binomial name
- Aulacomya regia Powell, 1957

Synonyms
- Aulacomya ater regia W. B. Powell, 1957; Aulacomya magellanica regia W. B. Powell, 1957

Species of bivalve

Aulacomya regia is a species of bivalve in the family Mytilidae. The scientific name of the species was first validly published in 1957 by W. B. Powell.
