= San Pedro Island (Chile) =

Island in Quellón, Chile

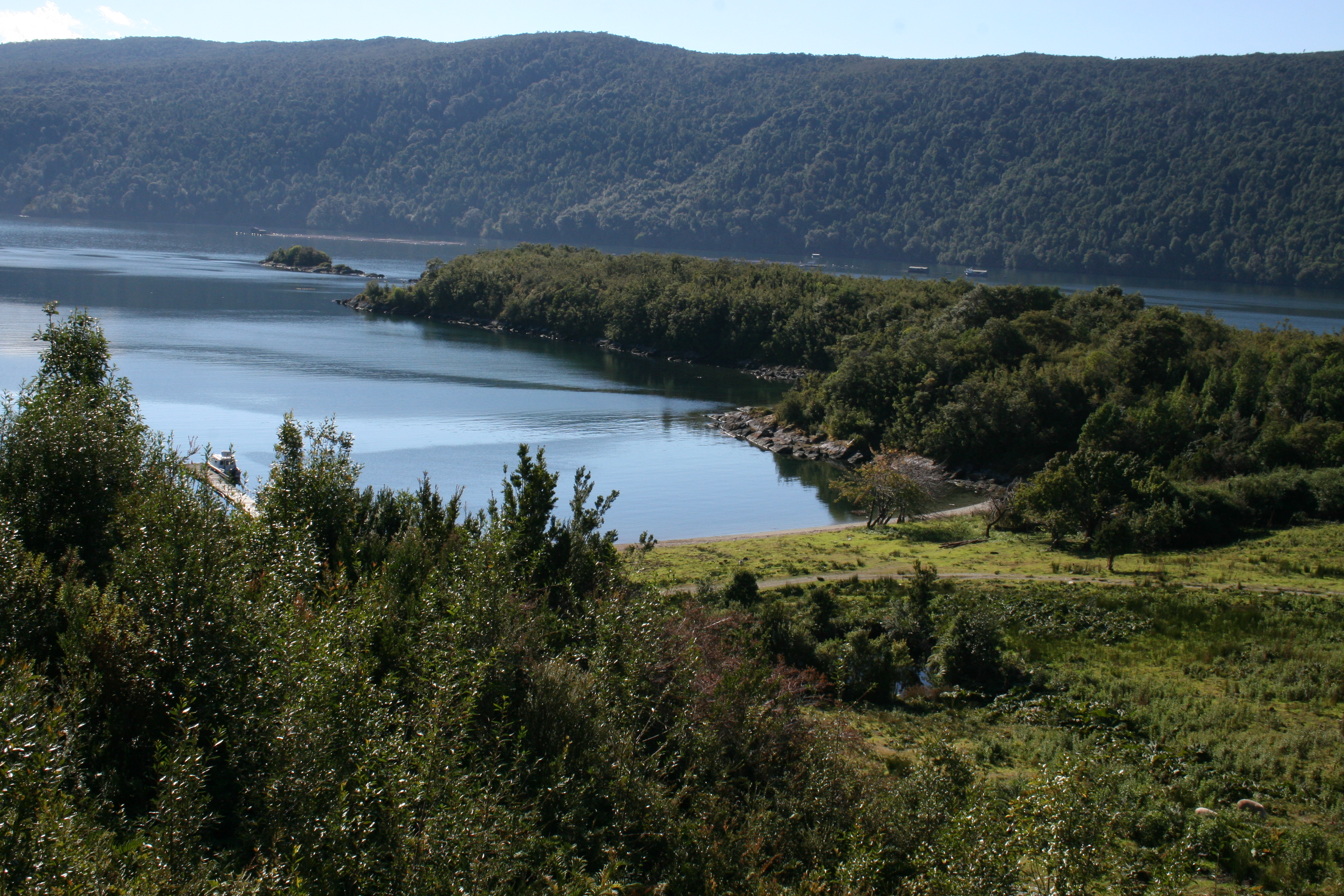
- Location of the former port on Isla San Pedro.

Geography
- Coordinates: 43°21′20″S 73°44′10″W

Isla San Pedro is a privately owned island located off the southeastern shore of Chiloé Island within the commune of Quellón, in Southern Chile.

== Geography ==
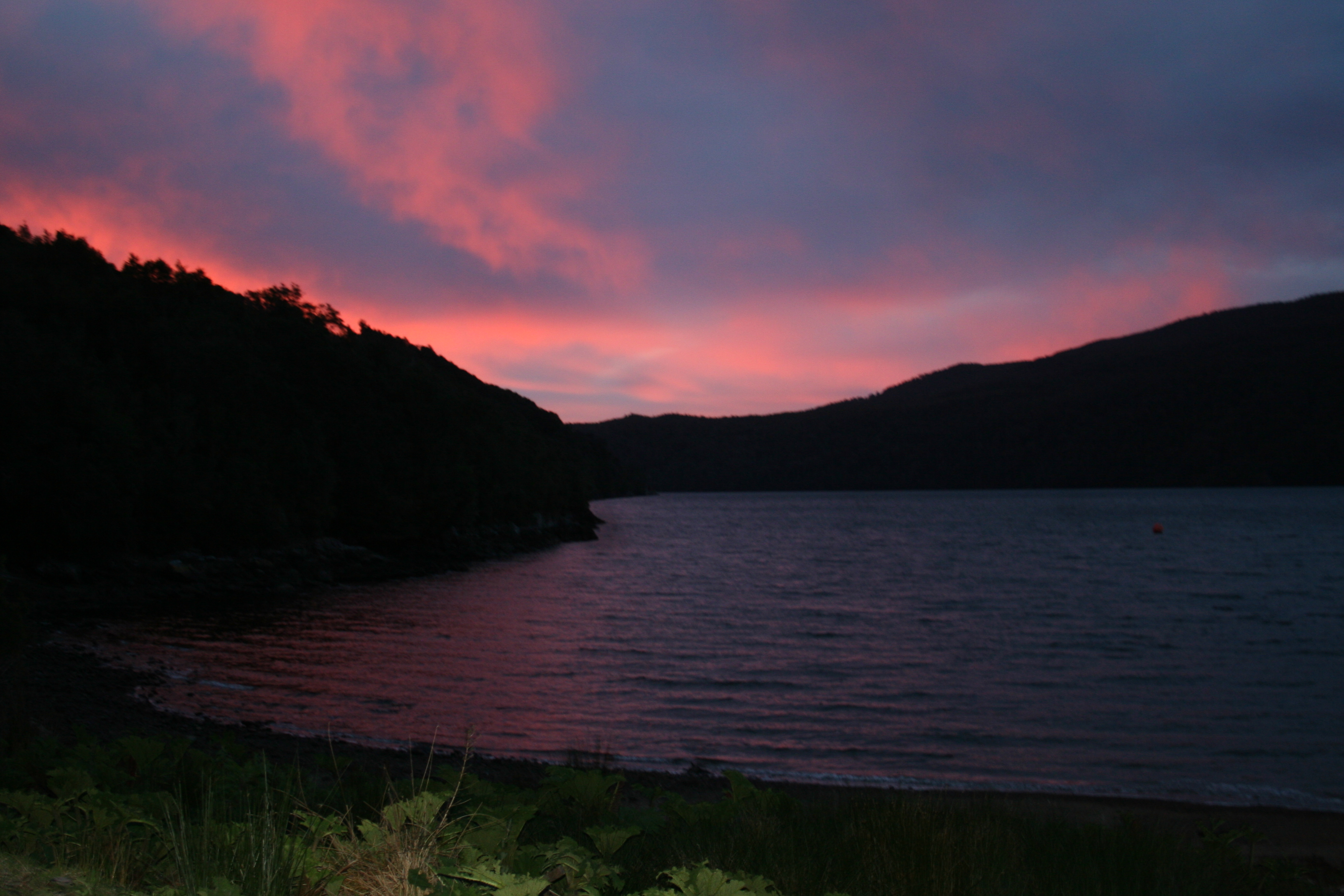
Isla San Pedro at sunset.

Isla San Pedro remains primarily undeveloped with 33.46 kilometers (20.79 miles) of road encircling the perimeter leading to beaches. There are two lakes located on the island along with cliffs along the coast which rise more than 500 meters (1640 feet) above sea level.

== Climate ==
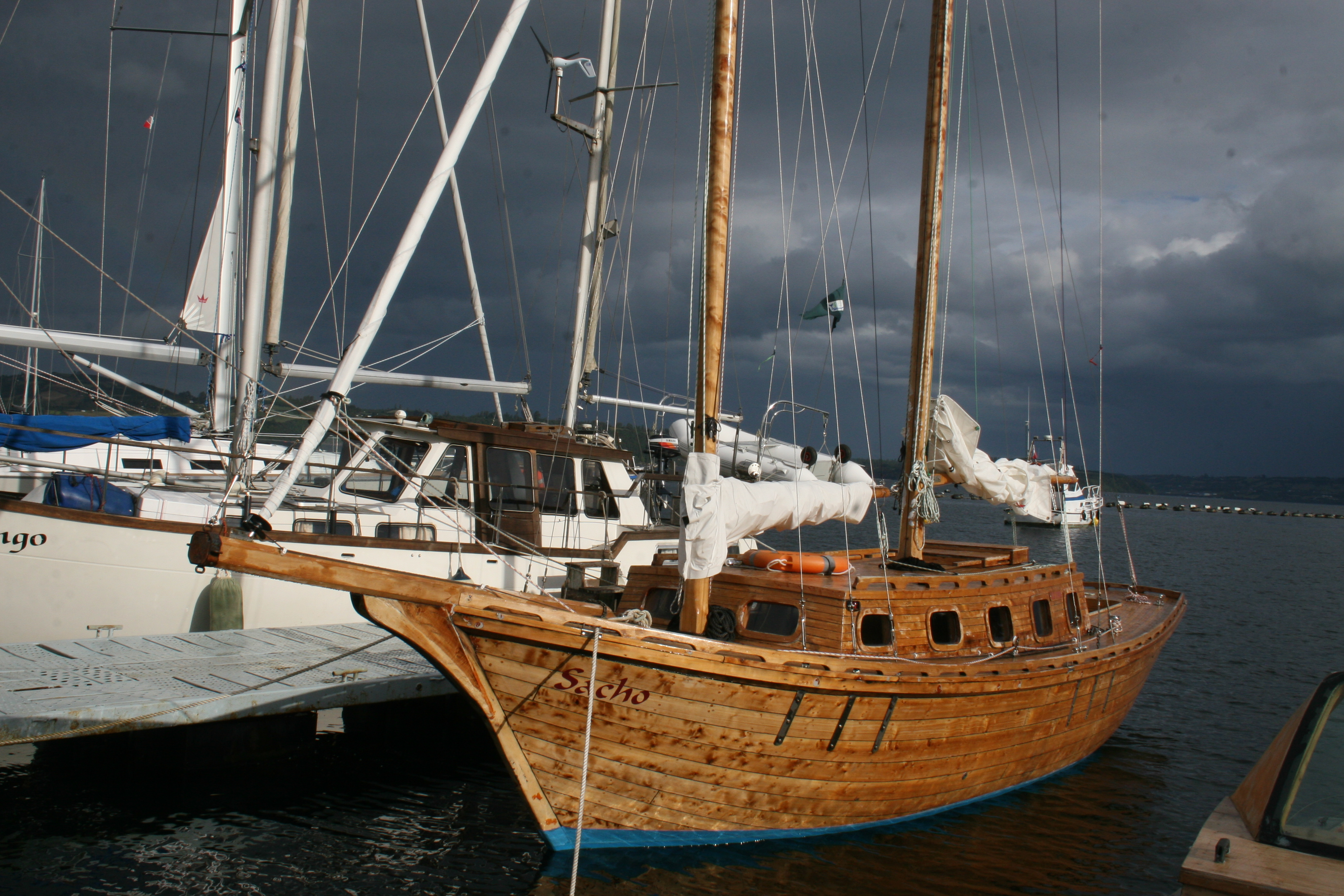
Due to an oceanic climate, winters see an increase in precipitation.

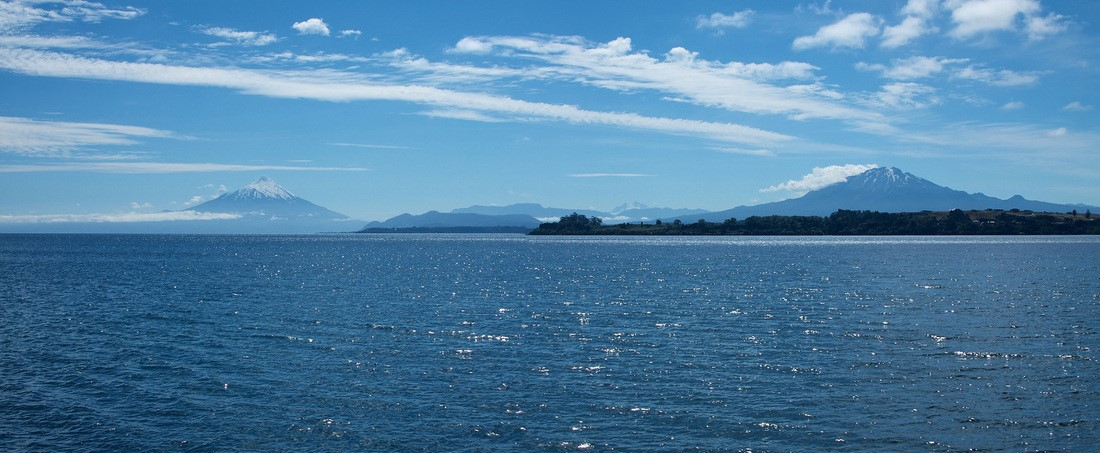
Due to an oceanic climate, summers are mild with low precipitation.

Chiloé has a temperate climate with moderate temperature and seasonal variations. The western side of the island is rainy. The eastern shore is warmer and drier as it exists on the rain shadow of the interior mountains.

The commune of Quellón has an oceanic climate. Summers are usually mild with low levels of precipitation; however, winters are usually cool and wet, but mild. February is the driest month. Few days are dry in winter because there are 22–24 days with measurable precipitation from June to August. However, snowfall is rare, and most years having no record of snowfall.

== Flora and fauna ==
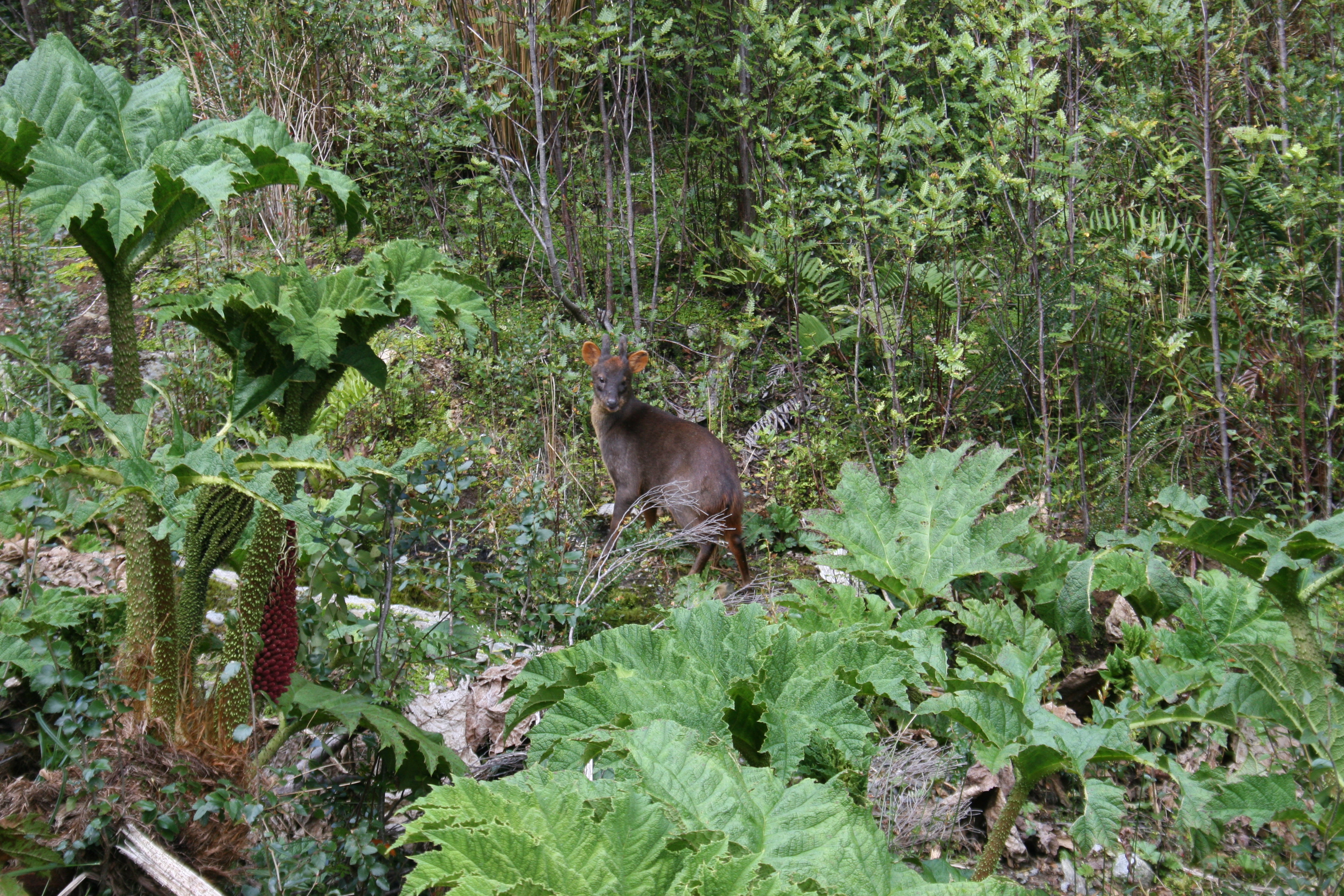
A southern pudú, the second smallest deer in the world, amongst Chilean rhubarb on Isla San Pedro.

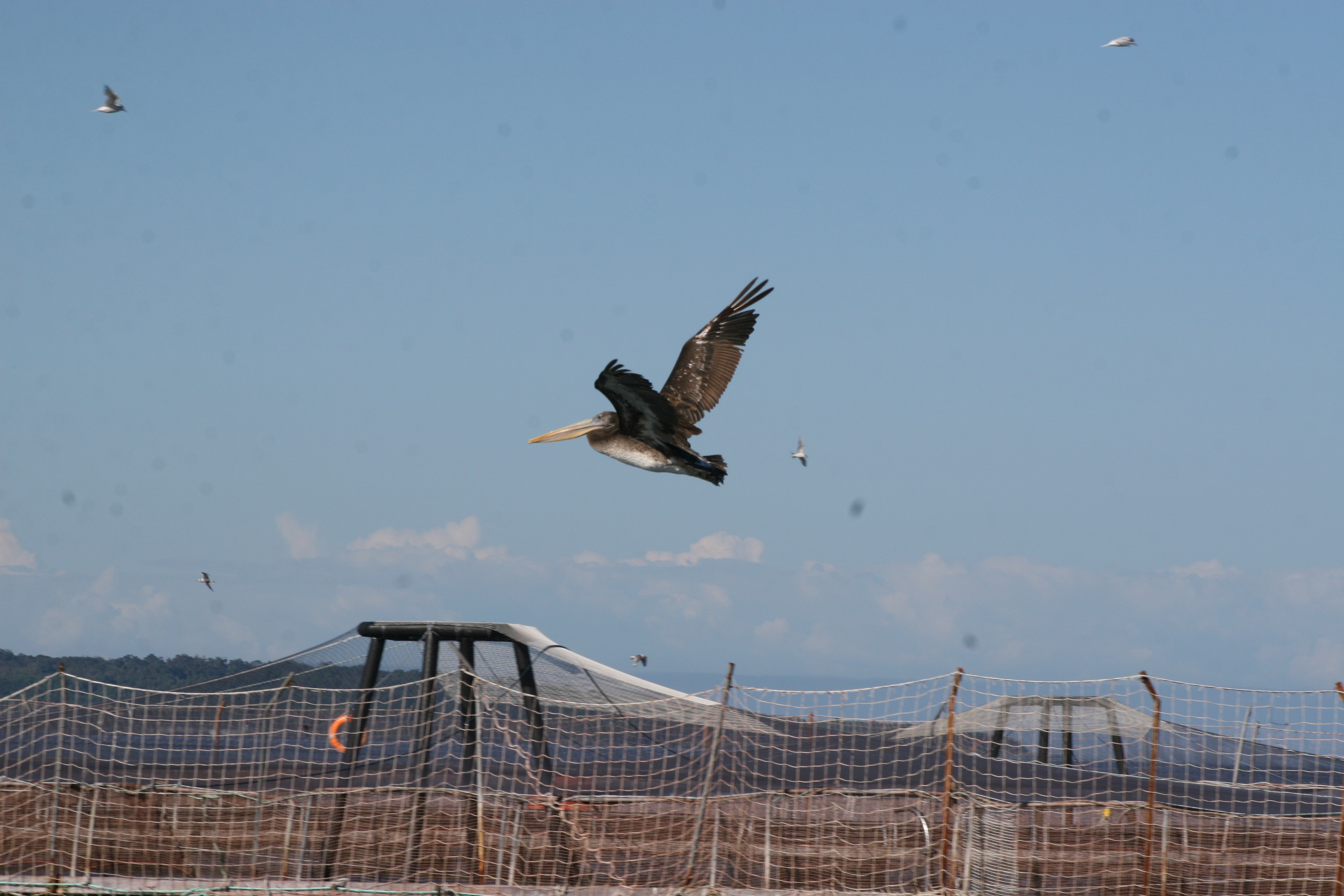
Pelicans can be seen around Isla San Pedro

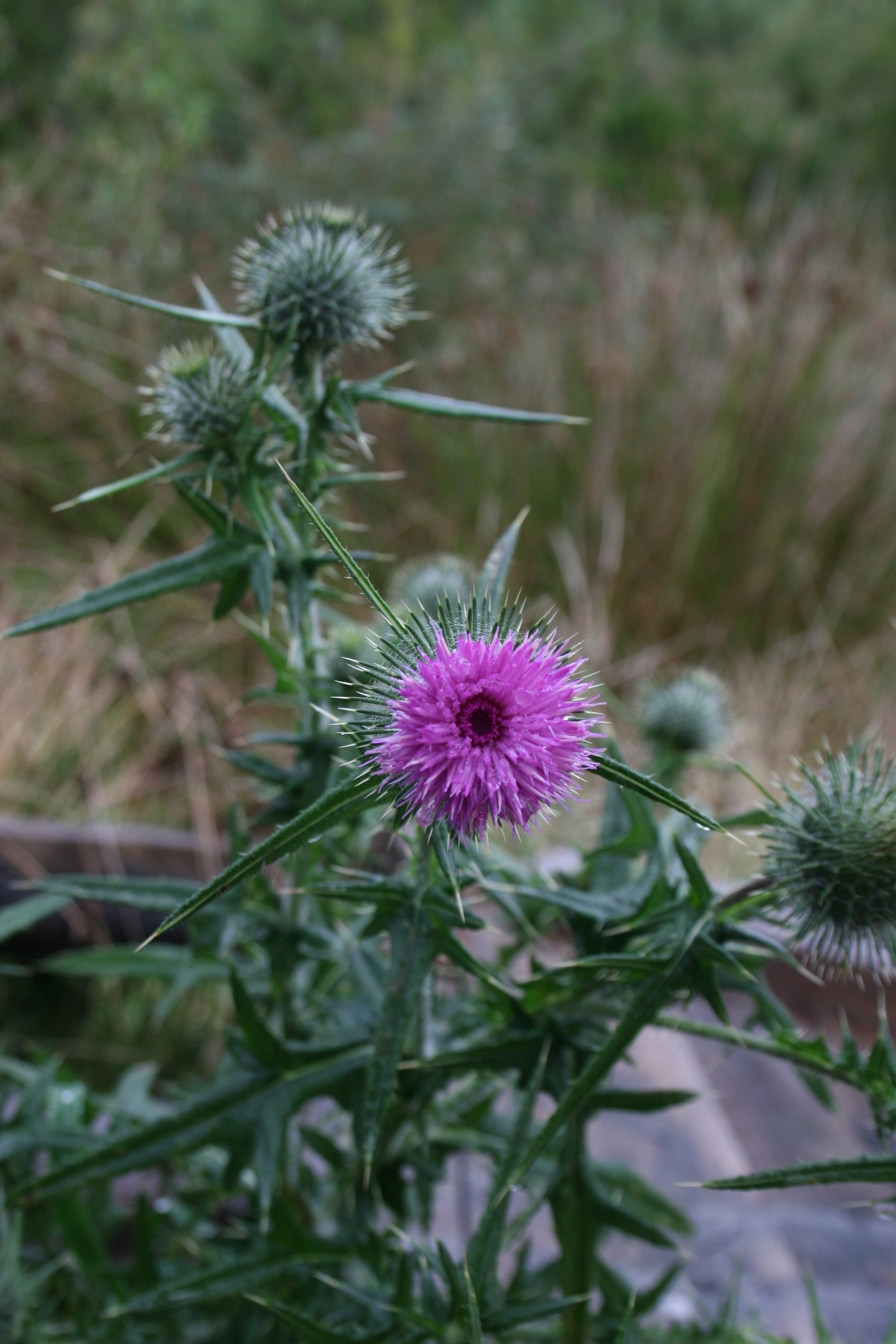
Flora found on Isla San Pedro

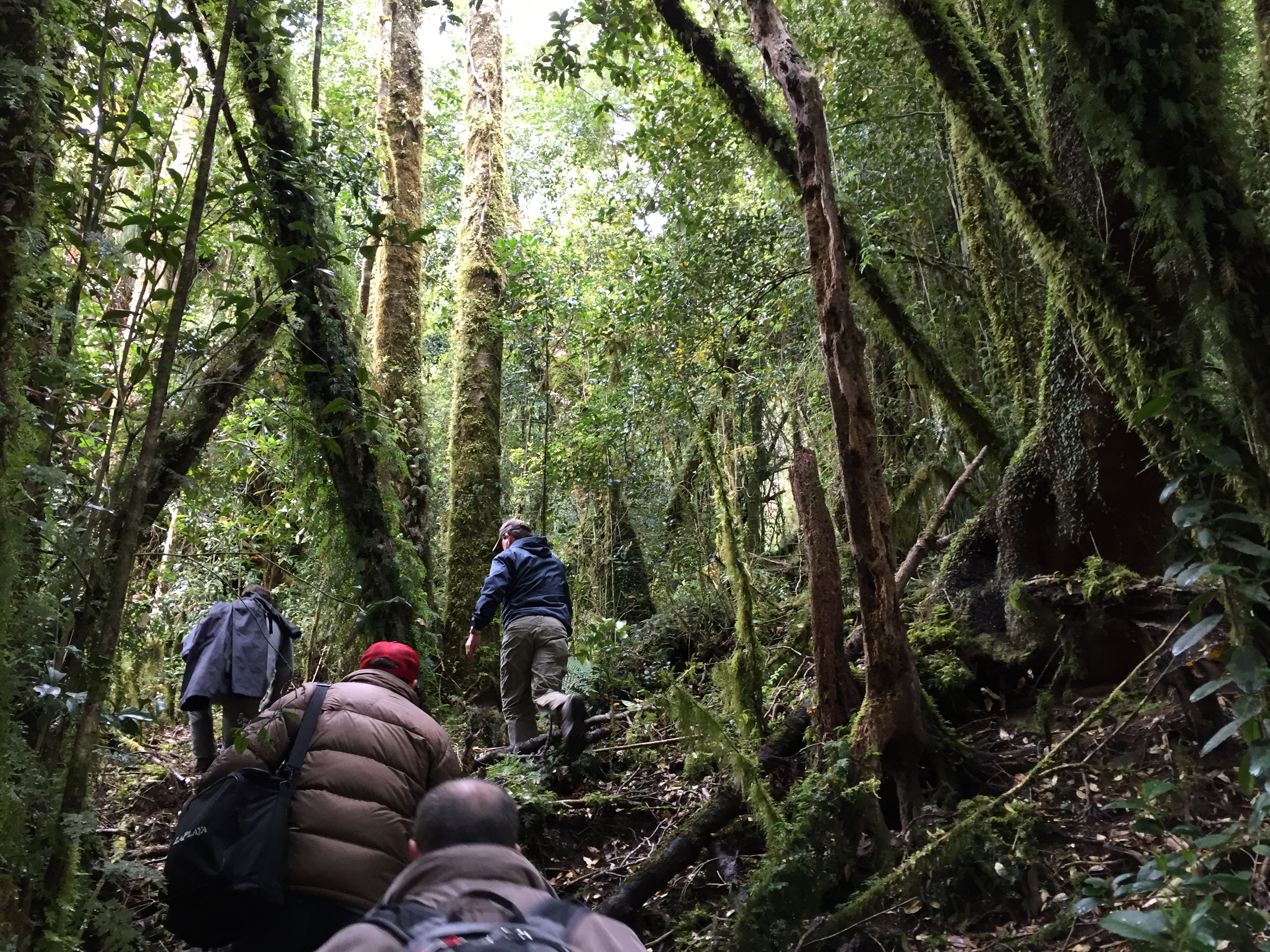
Hiking through the dense hardwood trees to the summit of San Pedro.

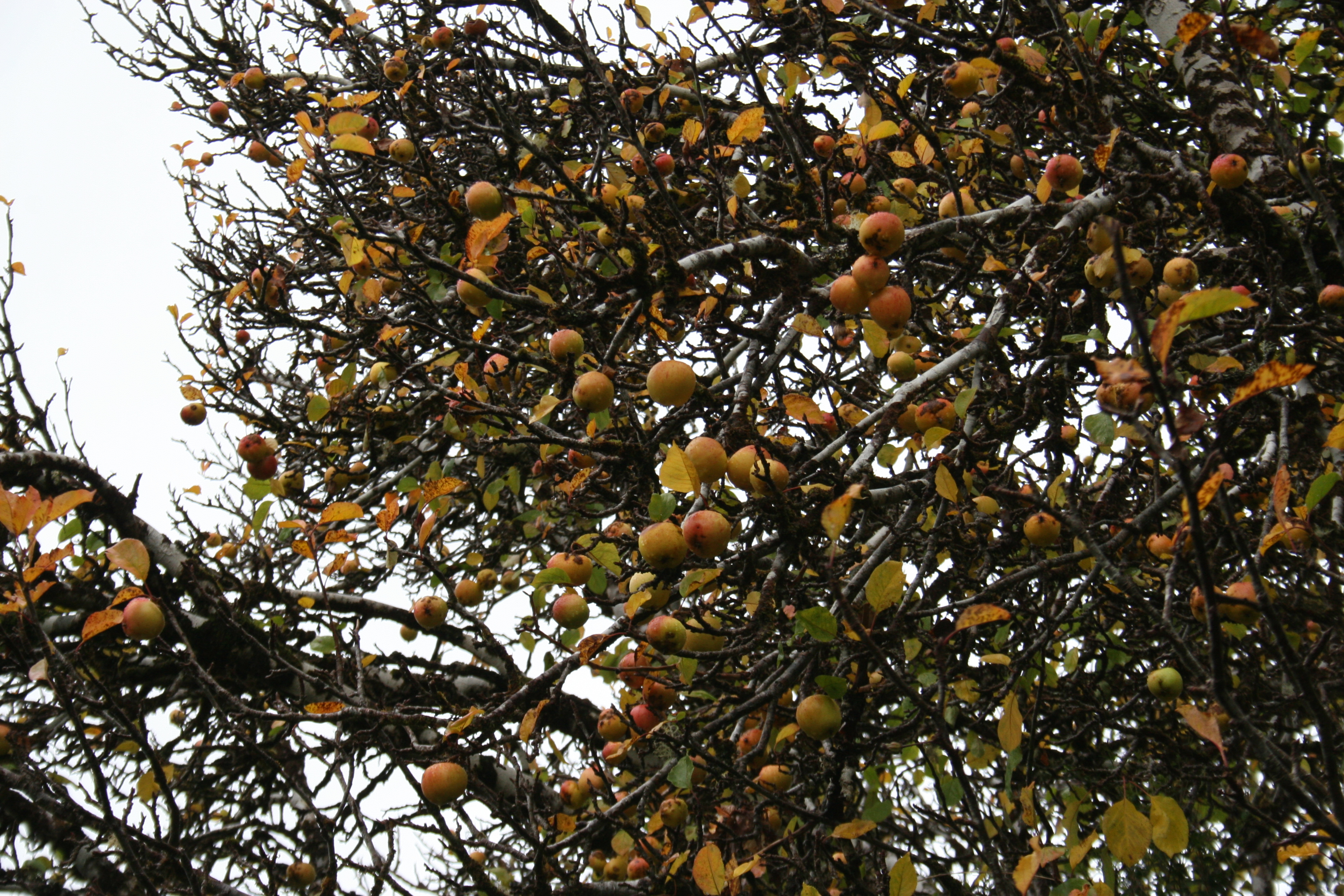
Apples on Isla San Pedro that can be used to make chicha, an alcoholic beverage similar to apple cider.

Isla San Pedro is home to Chucao tapaculos (Scelorchilus rubecula), black-necked swans (Cygnus melancoryphus), slender-billed parakeets (Enicognathus leptorhynchus), pelicans, cormorants (Phalacrocoracidae), and Chilean pigeons (Patagioenas araucana). In addition, the southern pudú which is the second smallest deer in the world can be found. Several species of whales have been sighted around the Chiloé Archipelago, including blue whales and southern right whales which are critically endangered. In addition, sea lions, sea otters, penguins, and dolphins can be seen from Isla San Pedro.

Charles Darwin visited Isla San Pedro in 1834 and later wrote of his experience in The Voyage of the Beagle. It was on the island that Darwin first collected the now critically endangered Darwin's fox (Lycalopex fulvipes). This was the first specimen ever collected and was donated to the Zoological Society of London. Darwin also wrote about his failed attempts to climb the summit of San Pedro due to an impenetrable forest.

The Chiloé Archipelago’s original vegetation is Valdivian temperate rain forest, a forest with a dense understory and a large variety of mosses and ferns. Isla San Pedro consists of approximately 16,000 acres filled with dense hardwood trees.

Types of trees that exist on the island include the Luma apiculata, the Ciprés de las Guaitecas (Pilgerodendron), the Drimys winteri (winter's bark or canelo - Mapuche sacred tree), the Nothofagus dombeyi (Dombey's beech, coigue, coihue, or coigüe [from koywe in Mapuche language]), and the Fitzroya cupressoides. There are also numerous types of trees on the island, including apple, cherry, and Chilean rhubarb (Gunnera tinctoria), known as nalca. Chicha, a local alcoholic beverage, was made from these apples by the original inhabitants through a process known as maja.

The national flower of Chile, the copihue (Lapageria rosea), can be found on Isla San Pedro. Purple thistles are also common on the island.

== History ==
The Chiloé Archipelago was first inhabited by two main groups of people: the Chonos and the tribe of the "Huilliches". The Chonos were nomadic people from the South that spoke their own tongue. The Chonos were known to be fishermen and have great sailing skills. The Huilliches were Pacific people and known for their farming skills. They were said to have resembled the Mapuche, a people indigenous to Chile, and the two would form alliances.

Christen Christensen, a shipowner, was one of the most important Norwegian shipping and whaling businessmen at the start of the 20th century. He was very interested in developing whaling activities from land stations along the coast of South America. In 1909, after some investigation by his son August Christensen and his crew, a Norwegian company known in the native language as "Sociedad Ballenera del Pacifico" (Pacific Whaling Company) and a port was established on San Pedro, with catcher boats and a land station known as "A/S Pacific." August managed the A/S Pacific from 1909 until 1913 when whaling operations on Isla San Pedro came to a close.

Articles from the time suggest a good relationship was formed between the A/S Pacific and the local Chilean community, as there were many locals employed at the land station.

== Reception ==
A local journalist invited to visit San Pedro wrote that “the small port of San Pedro is composed mainly by the whaling station and its installations, it is a very scenic place and its configuration resemble the mouth of a dog,” and that the installations were “splendid”. He described the afternoon spent on San Pedro as “very pleasing”.
