= Gulf of Ancud =

Gulf in Chile by Chiloé Island

Coordinates: 42.1°S 73.0°W

Map of the Sea of Chiloé and nearby roads. The Gulf of Ancud is seen in the centre of the upper half.

Gulf of Ancud (Spanish: Golfo de Ancud) is a large body of water separating the Chiloé Island from the mainland of Chile. It is separated from the Gulf of Corcovado by the Desertores Islands. To its north the Calbuco Archipelago separates it from Reloncaví Sound.

== Oceanography ==
Tidal depths along the Chilean coast increase from north to south. Around the archipelago of Chiloé, the tide splits in two, with one pulse from the Chacao Channel in the north and the other from Guafo in the south. These two streams meet around the Desertores Islands and in the extreme northwest of the Gulf of Ancud, southeast of Tres Cruces point.

Two high tides and two low tides are generally observed along the gulf's shoreline. These tend to vary widely in height, with the daytime high tide being higher in summer and the opposite being the case in winter. The tides' heights vary between 3 and 7 metres (9.8 and 23.0 ft).

The inflow current tends towards the north, while the outflow tends south. Its intensity varies according to channels' width and depth.

Tidal currents from the Pacific Ocean entering from the south push the gulf's waters northwards and inwards. In the extreme northwest of the gulf, around 4 nautical miles (7.4 km; 4.6 mi) southeast of Tres Cruces point, these clash with waters coming in from the Chacao Channel forming a notable skirmish line between both forces known as the Tique Line. This turbulence is often very dangerous for non-covered vessels, many of which have been wrecked trying to cross this line. Tidal variations along the coast are considerable, but much lower towards the center.

Depths at the center of the gulf are significant, and irregular along its northern and southern edges. Some deeper points exist in the northern sector.
