= Aulacomya =

Scientific classification
- Kingdom: Animalia
- Phylum: Mollusca
- Class: Bivalvia
- Order: Mytilida
- Family: Mytilidae
- Genus: Aulacomya; Mörch, 1853

Genus of bivalves

Aulacomya is a genus of edible saltwater mussels, marine bivalve molluscs in the family Mytilidae, the true mussels.

== Species ==
Species within the genus Aulacomya include:

- Aulacomya atra (Molina, 1782)
- Aulacomya capensis (Dunker, 1846)
- Aulacomya maoriana (Iredale, 1915)
- Aulacomya regia Powell, 1957

Synonyms include:

- Aulacomya ater (Molina, 1782) accepted as Aulacomya atra (Molina, 1782)
- Aulacomya magellanica (Chemnitz, 1783) accepted as Aulacomya atra (Molina, 1782)
