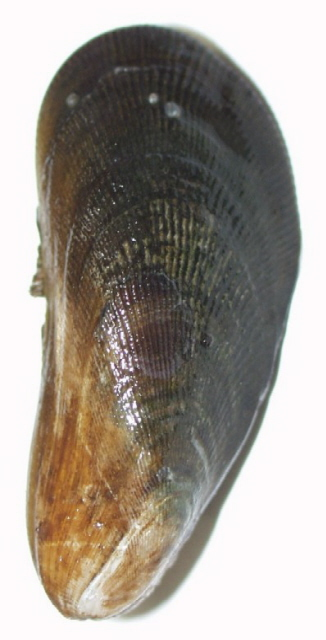

Scientific classification
- Kingdom: Animalia
- Phylum: Mollusca
- Class: Bivalvia
- Order: Mytilida
- Family: Mytilidae
- Genus: Geukensia
- Species: G. demissa

Binomial name
- Geukensia demissa (Dillwyn, 1817)

Synonyms
- Modiolus demissus (Dillwyn); Modiola plicatula (Lamarck); Volsella demissa (Dillwyn)

= Geukensia demissa =

Species of bivalve

Geukensia demissa is a species of mussel, a marine bivalve mollusk in the family Mytilidae, the true mussels. This species is native to the Atlantic coast of North America. The common names for this species include ribbed mussel, Atlantic ribbed marsh mussel and ribbed horsemussel. However, the common name ribbed mussel is also used for the Southern Hemisphere mussel Aulacomya atra. The appearance of the shell is grooved and oval in shape. The interior of this mussel is tinted purple.

The ribbed shells of this species usually attain a length of 10 cm length, and can be as large as 13 cm. Age can be determined by counting dark growth rings on the shell and mussels typically live 10 – 15 years, but more advanced ages are not uncommon.

== Distribution ==
The ribbed mussel occurs in the coastal waters of salt marsh habitats from the southern Gulf of St. Lawrence in eastern Canada, south along the western Atlantic coast to Florida. In the Gulf of Mexico this species is replaced by the southern ribbed mussel, Geukensia granosissima, and the two species hybridize in southern Florida.

The ribbed mussel has been introduced to Texas, Mexico, California, and Venezuela.

== Habitat ==
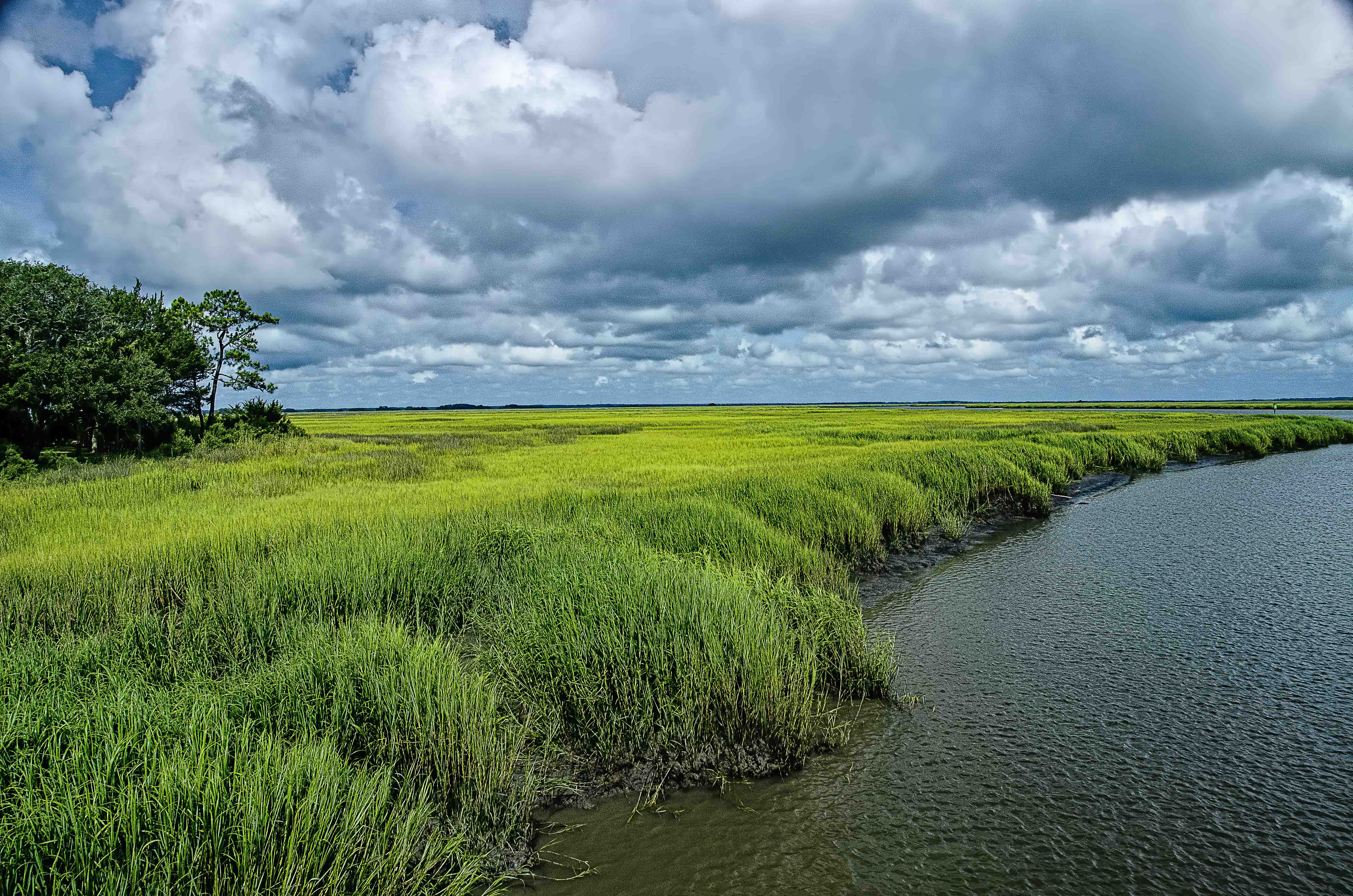
This salt marsh on Little St. Simon's Island is one of the many salt marshes that ribbed mussels inhabit.

Ribbed mussels live in the intertidal zone, attached to hard surfaces or embedded in sediment with the help of their byssal threads. They are typically found in salt marshes where they form dense aggregations with the marsh cordgrass (Spartina alterniflora) and each other since aggregating decreases an individual's chance of being preyed on.

Ribbed mussels are highly affected by small variations in temperature which makes their placement in the marsh important due to how variable temperature can be in salt marshes. Mussels that are in dense Spartina patches tend to be warmer than those who are not, and the amount of air flow that mussels receive can make a difference as well. Their position in the depth of the sediment also affects their internal body temperature.

Another example of how important microhabitats are for ribbed mussels is tidal height. In higher tidal zones, ribbed mussels do not grow to full potential and there are few out there; however, they tend to live long and have a better chance of survival.

Ribbed mussels face more predation on marsh edges as well. Some of their predators include birds, raccoons, and blue crabs.

== Reproduction ==
Ribbed mussels are dioecious and sexes can only be determined histologically.

They reproduce once per year in Connecticut and South Carolina, however in an introduced population in Venezuela two spawning peaks have been observed.

Mussels >15 mm are typically reproductive; however, it is not uncommon for mussels up to 35 mm to have no signs of gametogenesis. Their location in the salt marsh plays a role in when they become reproductive because edge ribbed mussels mature at smaller body sizes compared to other mussels.

Ribbed mussel larvae return to the marsh during recruitment, and they tend to settle near marsh edges where there are adult ribbed mussels.

== Diet ==
The ribbed mussel is a filter feeder, who consumes microalgae, bacteria, and nanoflagellates.

The speed at which ribbed mussels feed changes with temperature which is partially due to the availability of their food, and they feed more when their environment is warmer. Location also plays a role in filtration rates due to food quality and availability.

== Ecological importance ==
Ribbed mussels and other shellfish are able to store nutrients in the bodies and shells, through a process that may also remove toxins from the environment, and they can be used as bioindicators for certain pollutants like coliform bacteria. Ribbed mussels have been found with heavy metals in their tissues which suggests that they can filter such toxins out of the ecosystem. They also feed on algae, so they could be used to prevent harmful algal blooms.

Ribbed mussels have been found to increase growth in Spartina grasses. They accomplish this by adding nutrients, such as nitrogen, that Spartina need to grow into marsh sediments through their feces and pseudofeces. Ribbed mussels also use filaments known as byssal threads to anchor themselves, which help to stabilize substrate and reduce erosion. However, in urban environments ribbed mussels seem to instead have a negative effect on Spartina growth.

== Uses by humans ==
Native Americans near the Jamestown settlement manufactured shell beads that were called "rawrenock" in the local Powhatan language. The production process involved grinding broken ribbed mussel shells into disk-shaped beads and drilling a central hole to string the jewelry with. Surviving examples were recovered from the refuse that filled an abandoned well within the James Fort.
