= Guafo Island =

Island in Chile

Guafo
Native name: Isla Guafo
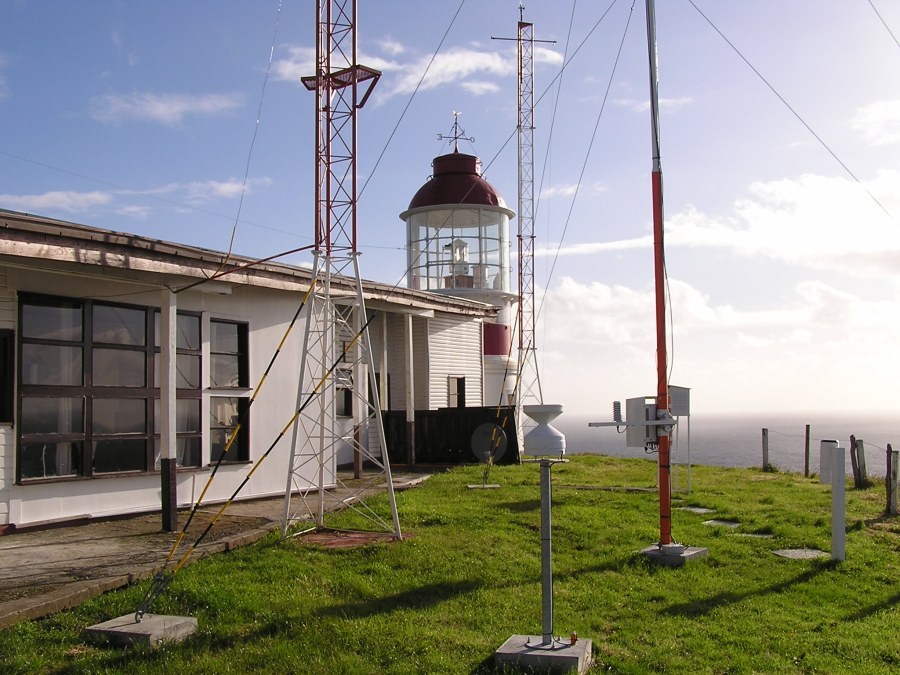
- Guafo Island lighthouse

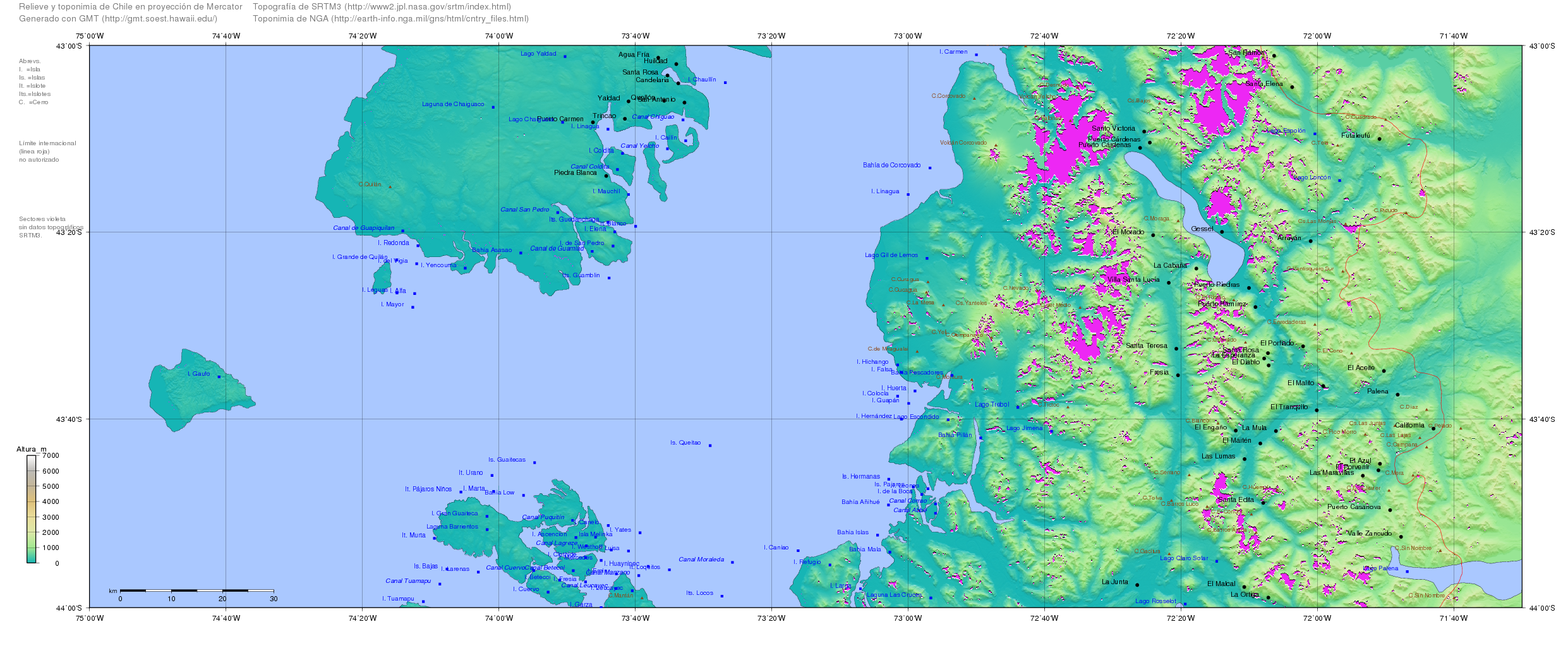
- Guafo Island, outlying the entrance to the Gulf of Corcovado

Geography
- Coordinates: 43.593029°S 74.713481°W
- Adjacent to: Pacific Ocean
- Area: 202 km^{2} (78 sq mi)

Administration
- Chile
- Region: Los Lagos
- Province: Chiloé Province
- Commune: Quellón

Demographics
- Population: 4

Additional information
- NGA UFI= -883559

Guafo Island is a Chilean island located southwest of Chiloé Island and northwest of Chile's Chonos Archipelago. This location and the prevailing westerly winds bring frequent rainstorms to the island. Ocean currents bring an abundance of fish into this area, making it one of the most productive marine areas in the Southern Pacific Ocean. Because of this, numerous marine vertebrates such as fur seals, sea lions and penguins come to the island to feed and reproduce.

In June 2025, Guafo Island was purchased by Rewild Organization, to preserve it from mining and timber logging and to ensure biodiversity preservation.

== Biodiversity ==
Guafo Island is characterized by a high biodiversity that includes the largest breeding colony of South American fur seals (Arctophoca australis) on Chilean coasts, a large population of South American sea lions (Otaria byronia), and a reproductively active population of marine otters (Lontra felina), a critically endangered species. The coasts of the island have been indicated as an important feeding area of blue whales (Balaenoptera musculus), Southern right whale (Eubalaena australis), humpback whales (Megaptera novaeangliae) and transient killer whales (Orcinus orca). Among seabird highlights is the largest breeding colony of sooty shearwater (Puffinusgriseus) in the world (Reyes-Arriagada et al. 2007), as well as important nesting sites of Magellanic penguins (Spheniscus magellanicus) and occasional sightings of Humboldt penguins (Spheniscus humboldti). Historical data also shows that the island was within the itinerary of HMS Beagle in 1835, during its second voyage. Guafo Island has been considered within areas that are important for marine conservation by the Wildlife Conservation Society and World Wildlife Fund.

== Lighthouse ==
The lighthouse was built in 1907 by George Slight. Its rotating four-man crews who serve four months at the station make up the only permanent population in the island.

The lighthouse itself is only 8 metres (26 ft) tall, but the light is 144 metres (472 ft) above the sea.

== Climate ==
Climate data for Guafo Island
Month	Jan	Feb	Mar	Apr	May	Jun	Jul	Aug	Sep	Oct	Nov	Dec	Year
Mean daily maximum °C (°F)	15.1 (59.2)	15.3 (59.5)	14.9 (58.8)	13.4 (56.1)	12.1 (53.8)	10.8 (51.4)	10.3 (50.5)	10.2 (50.4)	10.3 (50.5)	10.7 (51.3)	11.8 (53.2)	13.1 (55.6)	12.3 (54.1)
Daily mean °C (°F)	12.5 (54.5)	12.6 (54.7)	12.0 (53.6)	10.8 (51.4)	9.4 (48.9)	8.2 (46.8)	7.5 (45.5)	7.3 (45.1)	7.4 (45.3)	8.3 (46.9)	9.5 (49.1)	11.0 (51.8)	9.7 (49.5)
Mean daily minimum °C (°F)	9.6 (49.3)	9.4 (48.9)	8.8 (47.8)	7.3 (45.1)	6.3 (43.3)	5.4 (41.7)	4.7 (40.5)	4.6 (40.3)	4.5 (40.1)	5.4 (41.7)	6.6 (43.9)	8.0 (46.4)	6.7 (44.1)
Average precipitation mm (inches)	88.0 (3.46)	88.9 (3.50)	115.0 (4.53)	147.0 (5.79)	211.7 (8.33)	193.7 (7.63)	189.2 (7.45)	189.4 (7.46)	137.2 (5.40)	104.0 (4.09)	102.5 (4.04)	102.5 (4.04)	1,669.1 (65.71)
Source: Meteorología Interactiva
