= Sea of Chiloé =

Marginal sea off the coast of Chile

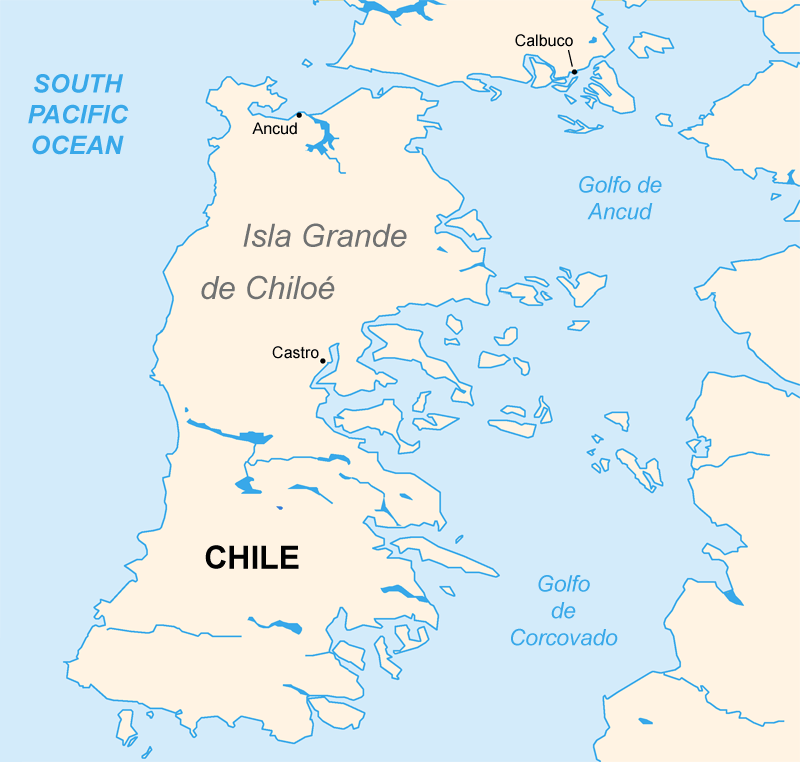
Map of the Sea of Chiloé, located between Chiloé Island and Continental Chile

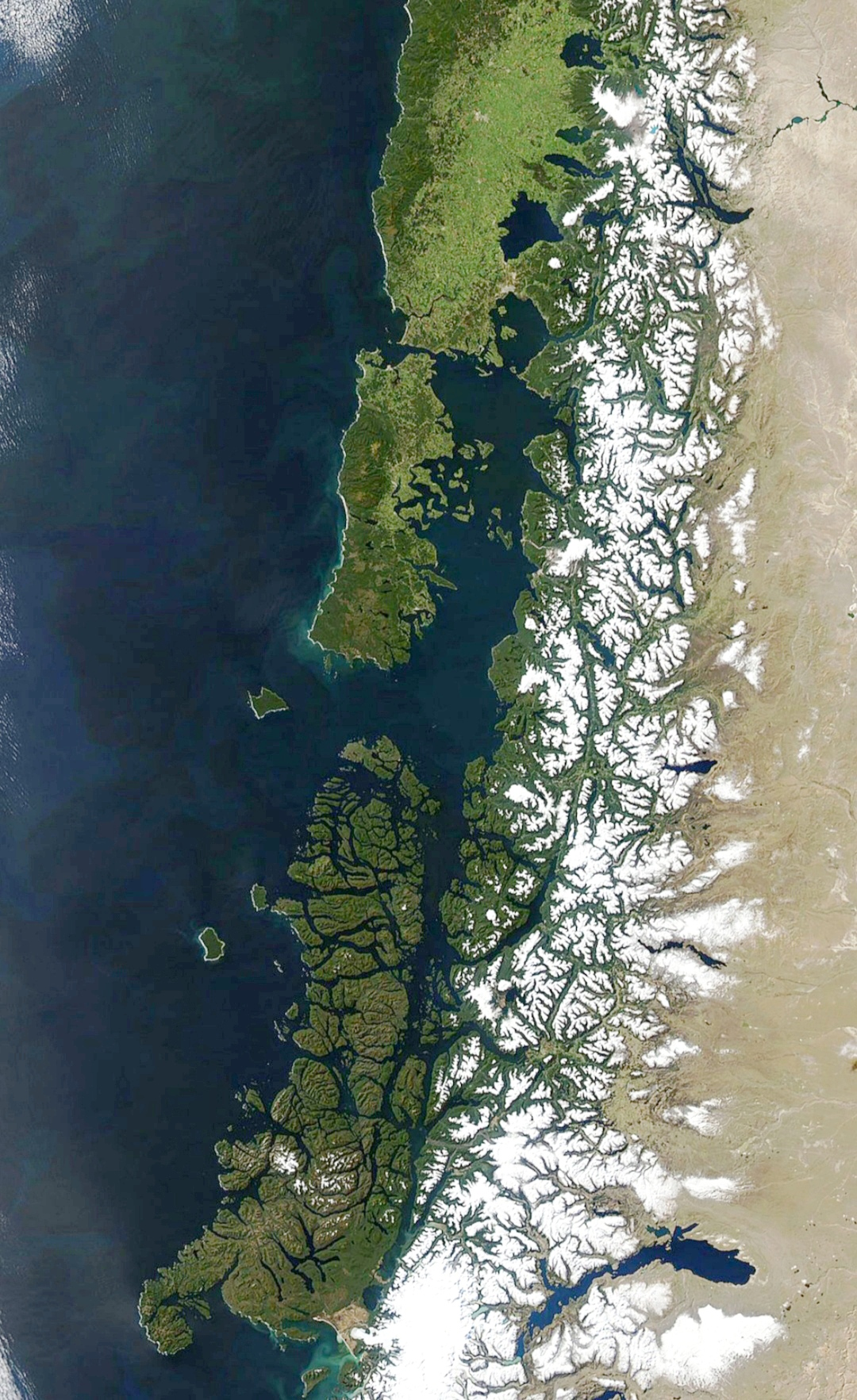
Satellite view of the Chiloé Sea

The sea of Chiloé (Spanish: Mar de Chiloé or Mar Chilote) is a marginal sea off the coast of Chile that is separated from the Pacific Ocean by Chiloé Island. The sea of Chiloé is connected to the open sea by Chacao Channel in the north and Gulf of Corcovado in the south. The host many of Chiloé Archipelago's islands as well as some other islands around Reloncaví Sound. The shores of the sea of Chiloé shows at various places channels, sounds and in the east also fjords. To the south beyond the Gulf of Corcovado the Sea of Chiloé gives way to Moraleda Channel.
