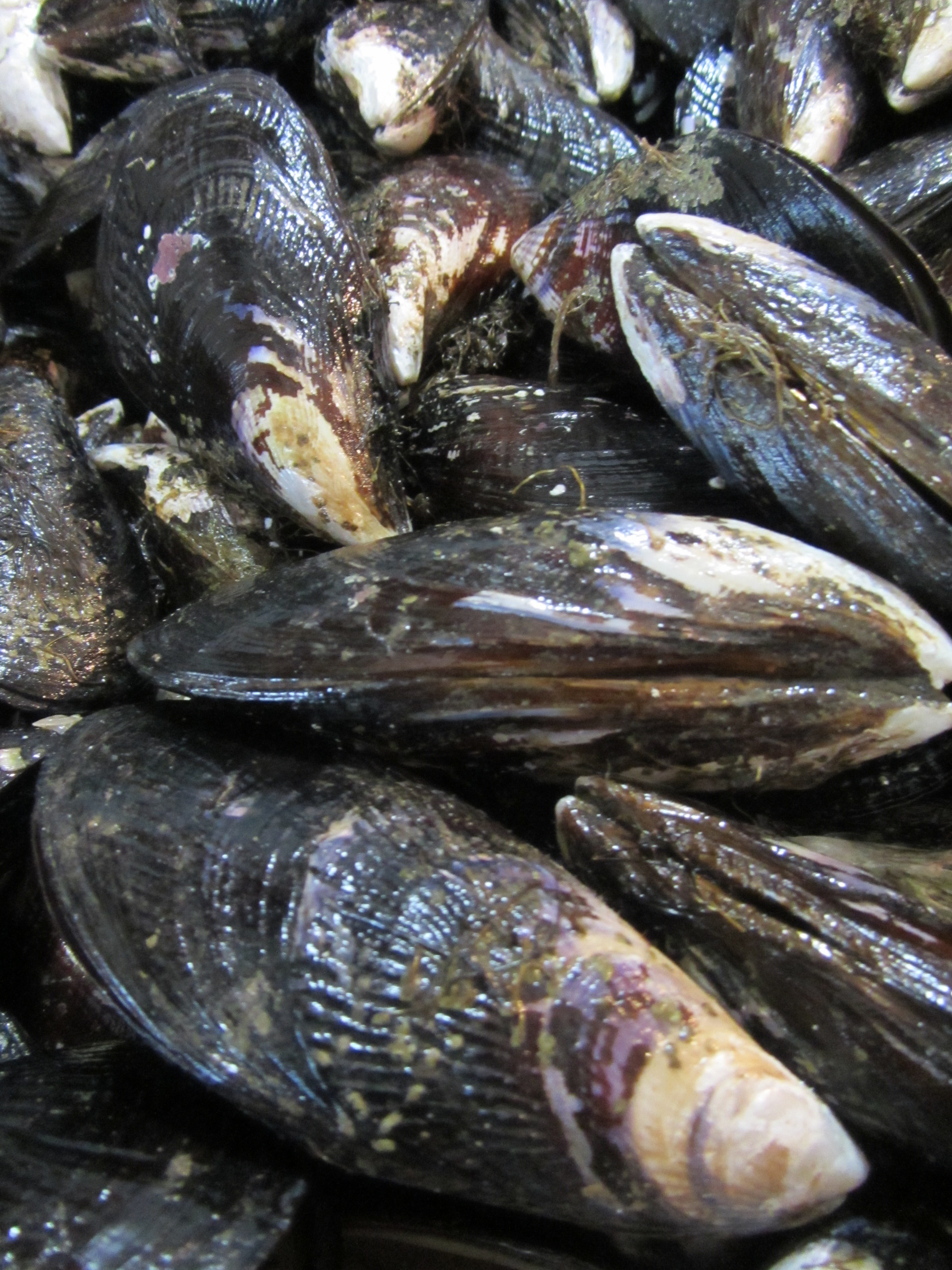

Scientific classification
- Kingdom: Animalia
- Phylum: Mollusca
- Class: Bivalvia
- Order: Mytilida
- Family: Mytilidae
- Genus: Aulacomya
- Species: A. atra

Binomial name
- Aulacomya atra (Molina, 1782)

Synonyms
- Mytilus crenatus Lamarck, 1819

= Aulacomya atra =

Species of bivalve

Aulacomya atra, called also the Magellan mussel or the ribbed mussel, is a southern species of edible saltwater mussel, a marine bivalve mollusk in the family Mytilidae, the true mussels. Note that the common name ribbed mussel is also used of the Northern Hemisphere mussel Geukensia demissa.

Aulacomya atra is native in South America - in Peru, Chile (where it grows up to 170 mm in length), the Falkland Islands and Argentina. It is also found on the coasts of New Zealand and southern Africa, from Namibia to Port Alfred, South Africa, from the intertidal to 40 m. Introduced specimens have been found in Moray Firth, Scotland. In Southern Africa the species grows up to 90 mm in length. It usually lives in crowded intertidal beds. Individual animals have brown ribbed shells, which darken to black with age.
