= List of bridges in Chile =

This is a list of bridges and viaducts in Chile, including those for pedestrians and vehicular traffic.

== Historical and architectural interest bridges ==
	Name	Distinction	Length	Type	Carries Crosses	Opened	Location	Region	Ref.
1	Cal y Canto Bridge demolished in 1888	Historic Monument (remains of the bridge)	202 m (663 ft)	Masonry; 9 semi-circular arches	Road bridge Mapocho River	1782	Santiago; 33°25′57.7″S 70°39′05.8″W	Santiago Metropolitan Region	
2	Conchi viaduct	Second highest railway viaduct in the world when inaugurated Height : 102 m (335 ft); Historic Monument	244 m (801 ft)	Trestle bridge Steel	Former Ferrocarril de Antofagasta a Bolivia; Loa River	1888	Calama; 22°01′55.5″S 68°37′15.5″W	Antofagasta Region	
3	Biobío Railway Bridge (Concepción)		1,886 m (6,188 ft)	Truss; Steel	Concepción-Curanilahue railway Biobío River	1889	Concepción–San Pedro de la Paz; 36°49′40.0″S 73°04′40.5″W	Biobío Region	
4	Malleco Viaduct	Height : 96 m (315 ft); Historic Monument	347 m (1,138 ft)	Truss; Steel; 4x69	Longitudinal Sur; Malleco River	1890	Collipulli; 37°57′46.8″S 72°26′18.6″W	Araucanía Region	
5	Maipo Bridge			Truss; Steel	Railway bridge Maipo River		San Bernardo–Buin; 33°41′24.3″S 70°43′21.6″W	Santiago Metropolitan Region	
6	Pedro de Valdivia Bridge	Withstood the 1960 Valdivia earthquake (9.5 magnitude, the strongest ever recorded)	239 m (784 ft)	Box girder Prestressed concrete 49+69+49	Valdivia River	1954	Valdivia; 39°48′41.4″S 73°14′56.5″W	Los Ríos Region	

== Major road and railway bridges ==
This table presents the structures with spans greater than 100 metres (330 ft) (non-exhaustive list).

	Name	Span	Length	Type	Carries Crosses	Opened	Location	Region	Ref.
1	Chacao Channel bridge under construction	1,155 m (3,789 ft)	2,634 m (8,642 ft)	Suspension; Steel box girder deck, 3 concrete pylons 284+1155+1055+43	Chile Route 5 Chacao Channel	2025	Chacao (Chiloé Island)–Pargua; 41°47′43.5″S 73°31′22.4″W	Los Lagos Region	
2	Presidente Ibáñez Bridge	210 m (690 ft)	210 m (690 ft)	Suspension; Steel truss deck, steel pylons	Chile Route 40; Aysén River	1966	Puerto Aysén; 45°24′16.5″S 72°41′04.4″W	Aysén Region	(Note: Historic Monument.)
3	Yelcho Bridge	150 m (490 ft)	250 m (820 ft)	Cable-stayed; Concrete girder deck, concrete pylons 50+150+50	Chile Route 7 (Carretera Austral); Yelcho River; Yelcho Lake	1989	Chaitén; 43°10′31.5″S 72°26′21.0″W	Los Lagos Region	
4	Treng Treng Kay Kay Bridge	140 m (460 ft)	240 m (790 ft)	Cable-stayed; Concrete box girder deck, 1 inclined concrete pylons 140+27+23	Road bridge Cautín River	2021	Temuco–Padre Las Casas; 38°44′59.2″S 72°35′22.3″W	Araucanía Region	
5	President Eduardo Frei Montalva Bridge	135 m (443 ft)	155 m (509 ft)	Suspension; Steel truss deck, concrete pylons	Chile Route S-40; Imperial River	1949	Carahue; 38°43′07.0″S 73°10′30.9″W	Araucanía Region	
6	Augusto Grosse Bridge			Suspension; Steel truss deck, steel pylons	Chile Route 7 (Carretera Austral); Mayer River		Villa O'Higgins; 48°28′57.7″S 72°35′18.8″W	Aysén Region	
7	General Carrera Lake Bridge			Suspension; Steel truss deck, steel pylons	Chile Route 7 (Carretera Austral); General Carrera Lake	1989	Puerto Guadal; 46°50′42.7″S 72°48′10.0″W	Aysén Region	
8	Sergio Sepúlveda Bridge			Suspension; Steel truss deck, steel pylons	Chile Route 7 (Carretera Austral); Rosselot river		La Junta; 43°57′41.3″S 72°23′48.2″W	Aysén Region	

== See also ==
- Transport in Chile
- List of highways in Chile
- Empresa de los Ferrocarriles del Estado
- History of rail transport in Chile
- Geography of Chile
- List of rivers of Chile
- es:Anexo:Puentes sobre el río Mapocho en Santiago de Chile (in Spanish) - Bridges over the Mapocho river in Santiago de Chile

== Notes and references ==
- Notes
- Nicolas Janberg. "International Database for Civil and Structural Engineering". Structurae.com.
- Others references
