= Fort Tauco =

Coordinates: 42°33′08″S 73°45′07″W

- Fuerte Tauco
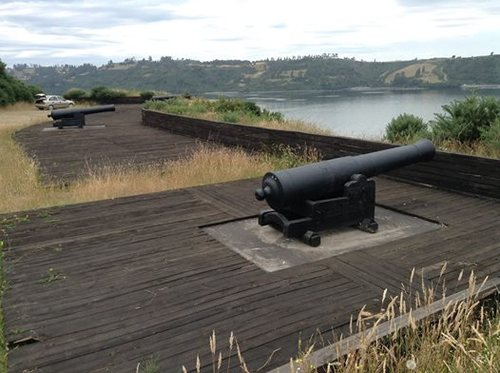
- Fort Tauco
- Interactive map of Fort Tauco
- Location: Estero de Castro, Chonchi; Chile
- Designer: Miguel de Zorrilla
- Type: Coastal battery
- Completion date: 1779

Fort Tauco (From Spanish: Fuerte Tauco, also known as Fortín Tauco) is a coastal battery built in 1779 in the commune of Chonchi, Province of Chiloe in southern Chile.

== History ==
=== Colonial history ===
In 1767 the Governorate of Chiloé was separated from the Capitanía General de Chile, and attached directly to the Viceroyalty of Perú. This administrative change introduced many transformations to the archipelago, including building a series of military forts around Chacao Channel and in the middle of the province. In this context, the Spanish engineer Miguel de Zorrilla designed a coastal fort able to protect the access to the city of Castro, capital of the province.

Zorrilla designed a military placement in one of the narrower points of the fjord of Castro, and for this purpose a cut was made in one of the hills surrounding the fjord, in order to build an artificial terrace for the battery. In this place three cannons and a culverin were installed. In this place were also located the barracks for the soldiers that occasionally had to take guard there. For protection against coastal attacks, the fort had a parapet of fascine in front of the terrace

The fort was supported by a look-out dedicated to the vigilance of the fjord, and located not far from there.

=== Republican history ===
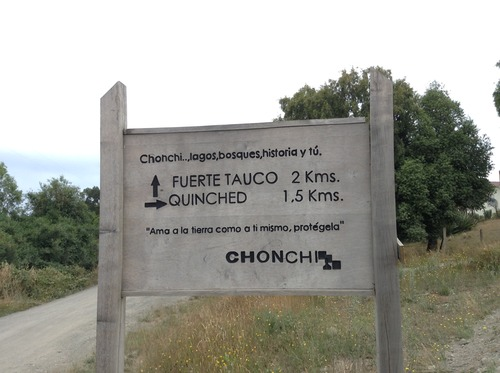
Access to Fort Tauco

Due to its location, Fort Tauco was never used in battle, and during the independence wars its usage was just as an alert system among the communities of the zone.

Since 1826 the place is abandoned, and in 1930 its cannons are moved to Castro, where were used as decorations of the main square of the city until the first years of the 21st century. During this operation, the culverin was lost due to its falling overboard.

It was declared national monument by the decree 744 of 1926, but a report from the Chilean Society of History and Geography, which indicated that forts of Tauco, Poquillihue, Chacao and Pargua were totally destroyed, led to the removal of the category for those places through the decree 1295 of 1983.

After a process of restoration, three cannons were returned from Castro to their original position in the fort. However, due to the lack of infrastructure, the archaeological discoveries of the forts are currently located in the Municipal Museum of Castro.

In the year 2015 a new restoration process was executed. This project included building a new wooden look-out in the historical terrace with information about the site, and a lighting system visible from the sea. The work was finished in the first months of 2016.
