= Castro, Chile =

Castro
- City and Commune
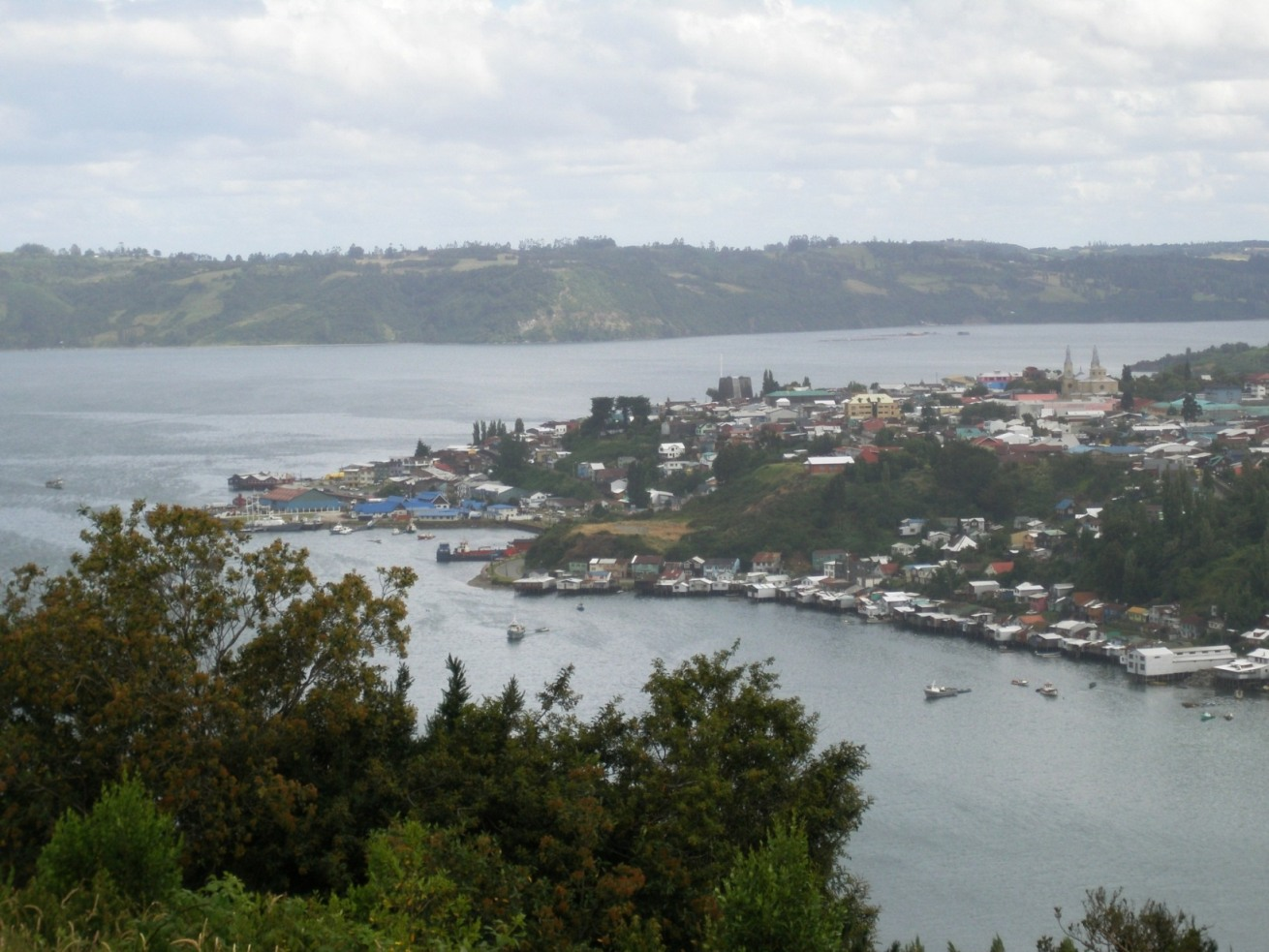
- Panoramic view of Castro

- Coat of arms

- The Commune of Castro in Los Lagos Region
- Coordinates (city): 42°28′S 73°48′W
- Country: Chile
- Region: Los Lagos
- Province: Chiloé
- Founded as: Santiago de Castro
- Founded: 12 February 1567

Government
  - Type: Municipality
  - Alcalde: Juan Eduardo Vera (UDI)

Area
  - Total: 427.5 km^{2} (165.1 sq mi)
- Elevation: 130 m (430 ft)

Population (2012)
  - Total: 41,667
  - Density: 97.47/km^{2} (252.4/sq mi)
  - Urban: 29,148
  - Rural: 10,218
- Demonym: Castreño/a

Sex
  - Men: 19,325
  - Women: 20,041
- Time zone: UTC−4 (CLT)
  - Summer (DST): UTC−3 (CLST)
- Postal code: 5700000
- Area code: 56 + 65
- Climate: Cfb
- Website: www.municastro.cl (in Spanish)

Castro is a city and commune on Chiloé Island in Chile. Castro is the capital of the Chiloé Province in the Los Lagos Region. The city is located on Estero de Castro on the eastern coast of central Chiloé Island. This position provides Castro with a good access to the eastern islands of Chiloé Archipelago as well as to the open ocean through Cucao and Huillinco to the west.

== History ==
Castro is Chile's third oldest city in continuous existence. Rodrigo de Quiroga as the temporary governor of Chile in 1567 launched a campaign led by his son in-law Captain Martín Ruiz de Gamboa to conquer Chiloé Island, establishing the city of Castro there, and subjugating its inhabitants, the Cuncos. From its founding on 12 February 1576 until 1767 Castro was the administrative centre of Chiloé Island. In 1594 Castro had 8,000 inhabitants most of whom were farmers. Up to the middle of the 17th century the town was looted by Dutch pirates several times.

In 1767, during the time of the Bourbon Reforms that sought to modernize the Spanish Empire, Chiloé was separated from the General Captaincy of Chile to which it had previously belonged and made a direct subject of the Viceroyalty of Peru. To ease the communications with Lima the capital of the archipelago was moved from Castro to Ancud in the same year. Even after the incorporation of Chiloé into the Republic of Chile, Ancud remained the capital of the archipelago. Castro was destroyed by an earthquake in 1837 and had only 1,243 inhabitants in 1907. After the inauguration of the railway line to Ancud in 1912 the town developed better. Many buildings, including the railway station, town hall and many of the wooden palafitos houses, were destroyed or damaged by the earthquake and tsunami of 1960. In 1960, Castro had 7,000 inhabitants. Only in 1982 did Castro regain its role as the capital of the Chiloé Archipelago.

On December 10, 2021, a fire destroyed several structures in the city and led many residents to evacuate.

== Demographics ==
Historical population
Year	Pop.	±% p.a.
1875	14,287	—
1885	14,838	+0.38%
1895	15,437	+0.40%
1907	17,213	+0.91%
1920	21,539	+1.74%
1930	20,661	−0.42%
1940	22,227	+0.73%
1952	18,863	−1.36%
1970	22,899	+1.08%
1982	26,984	+1.38%
1992	29,931	+1.04%
2002	39,366	+2.78%
2017	43,807	+0.72%
2024	46,997	+1.01%
Source: "Censo de Población y Vivienda". National Statistics Institute.

According to the 2002 census of the National Statistics Institute, Castro spans an area of 427.5 km^{2} (165 sq mi) and has 39,366 inhabitants (19,325 men and 20,041 women). Of these, 29,148 (74%) lived in urban areas and 10,218 (26%) in rural areas. The population grew by 31.5% (9,435 persons) between the 1992 and 2002 censuses.

== Administration ==
As a commune, Castro is a third-level administrative division of Chile administered by a municipal council, headed by an alcalde who is directly elected every four years. The 2012-2016 alcalde was Nelson Águila Serpa (PDC).

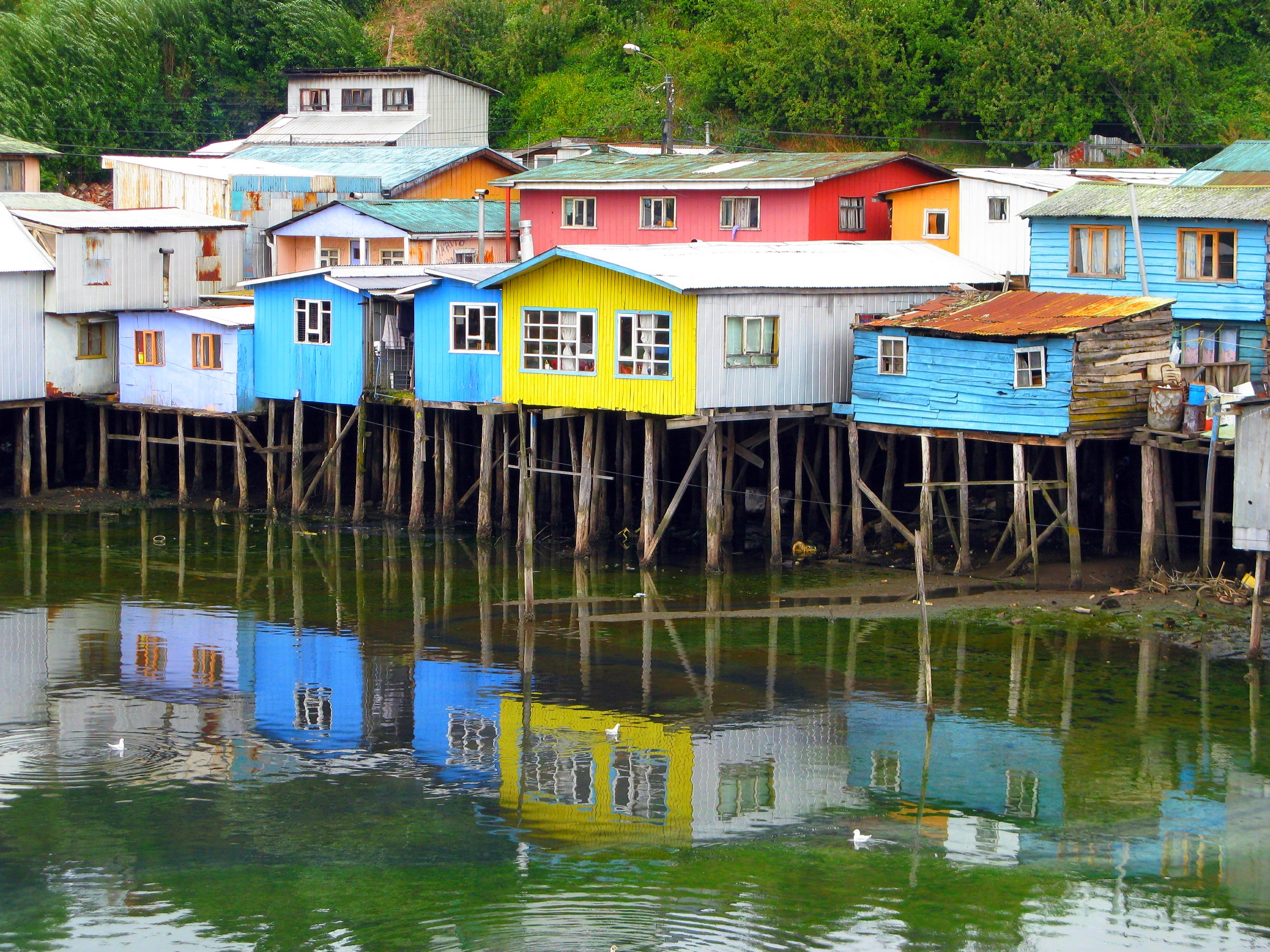
Colourful palafitos in Castro

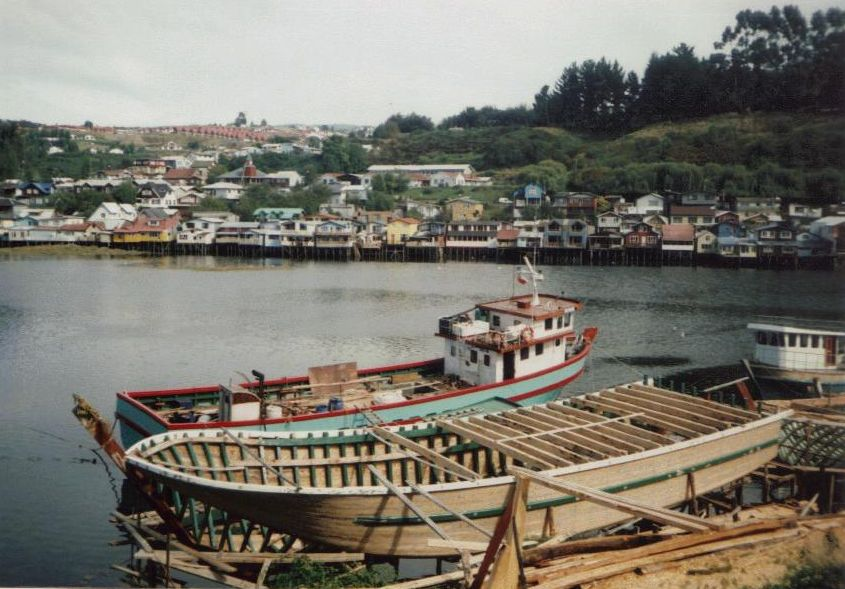
Wharf in Gamboa

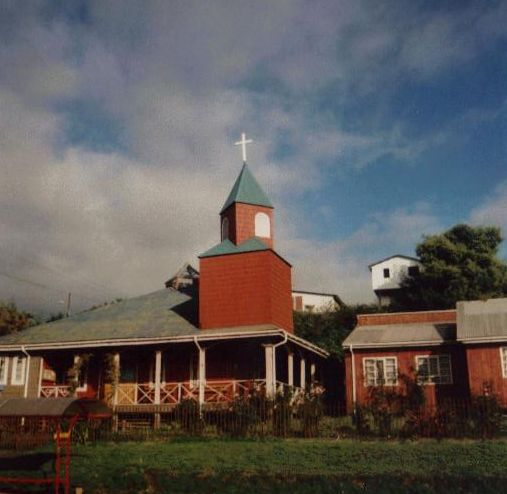
Wooden chapel in Gamboa

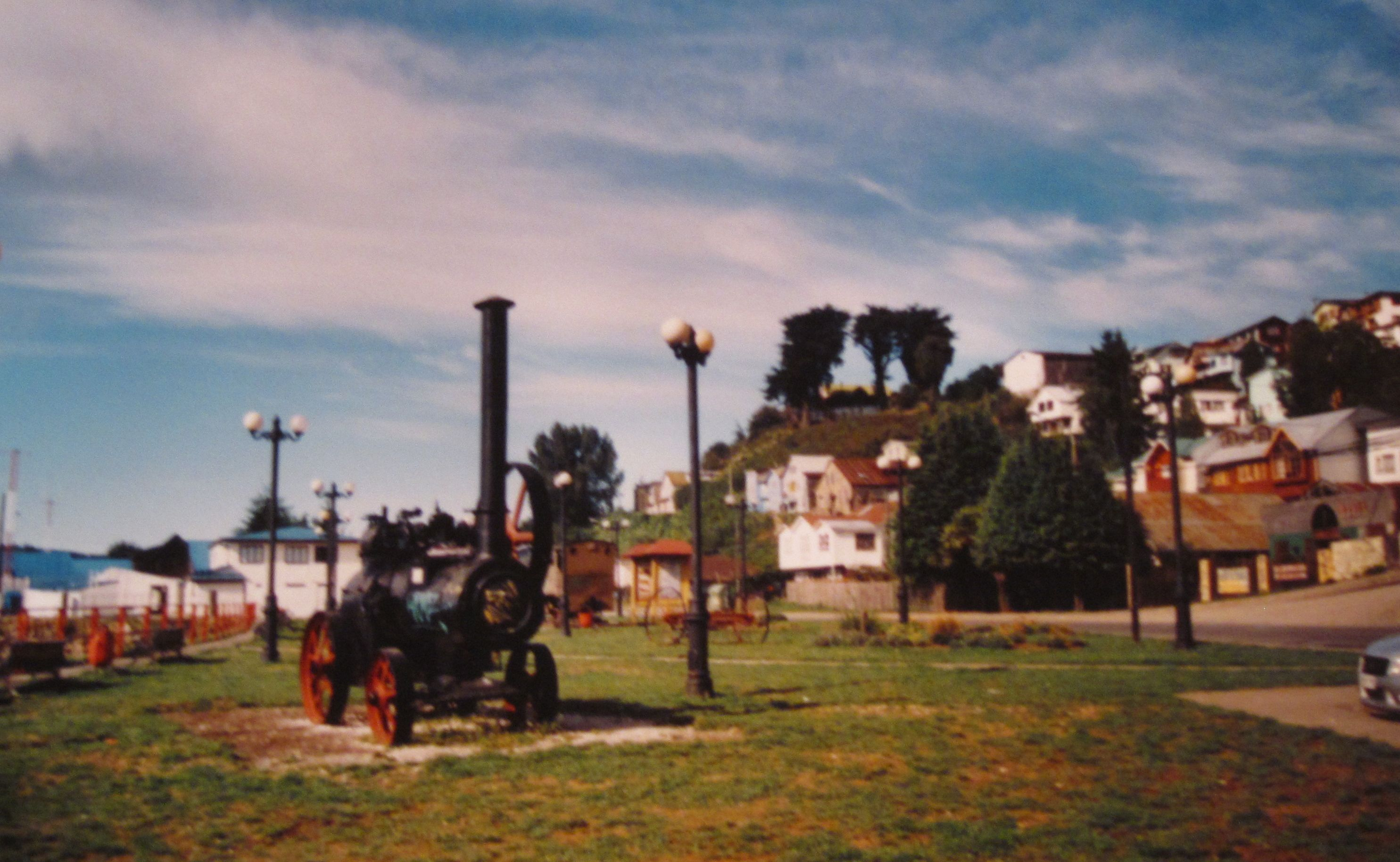
Plazuela del Tren park

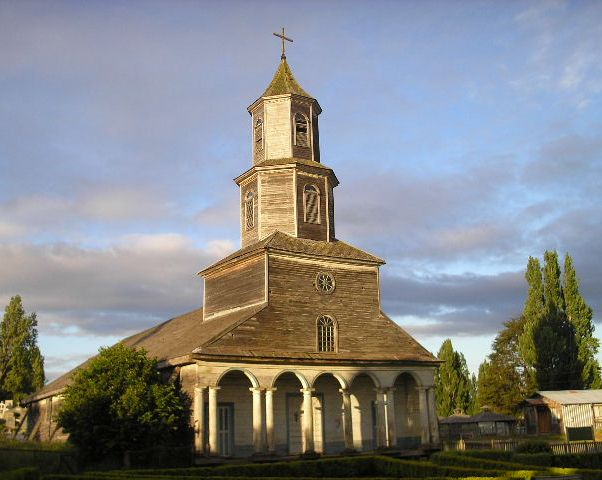
Nuestra Senora de Gracia in Nercón

Within the electoral divisions of Chile, Castro was represented in the Chamber of Deputies by Gabriel Ascencio (PDC) and Alejandro Santana (RN) as part of the 58th electoral district, together with Ancud, Quemchi, Dalcahue, Curaco de Vélez, Quinchao, Puqueldón, Chonchi, Queilén, Quellón, Chaitén, Hualaihué, Futaleufú and Palena. The commune was represented in the Senate by Camilo Escalona Medina (PS) and Carlos Kuschel Silva (RN) as part of the 17th senatorial constituency (Los Lagos Region).

== Sights ==
- Castro is famous for its palafitos, traditional wooden stilt houses which were common in many places in Chiloé. Some of them are preserved in the town district Gamboa in the west of the town in a bay called Fiordo de Castro. Boats are built in a traditional way in a wharf between the town center and Gamboa. In Gamboa there is an interesting wooden chapel as well.
- Plaza de Armas, the central town square with its well-kept park, the Municipality and the church has always been the middle of Castro. The square is surrounded by many shops, banks, bars and restaurants.
- The Regional Museum of Castro (Museo Regional de Castro) exhibits many objects made in Chiloé as well as samples of ethnography and archaeology.
- The Museum of Modern Art of Chiloé (Museo de Arte Moderno de Chiloé) which was founded in 1988 houses an important collection of contemporary art.
- A small park called Plazuela del Tren was laid out on the former railway yard close to the harbour. A locomotive and some other vehicles and machinery referring to the railway line to Ancud which was operated from 1912 to 1960 are exposed here.
- In Nercón, a village which was incorporated into Castro in 2007, there is another sightworthy church which was declared World Heritage by the UNESCO: Nuestra Señora de Gracia was built 1886-90 of Nothofagus dombeyi wood, and a well-kept garden can be seen in front of it.
- A small chapel with ex-votoes can be seen between Nercón and Castro at the bridge over River Nercón near a small wharf where boats are produced of larch wood

== Colonial fort system ==
During colonial times, Castro was the site of a small fort system made up of Fuerte de Castro, Batería marítima de Castro and Fortín de Tauco. The last fortification is not located in Castro proper but a few kilometers south along Estero de Castro. Only the remnants of Fortín de Tauco can be found at present, there are no known vestiges of the two fortifications that were located in what is now the city of Castro.

== Transportation ==
The city is accessed by Route 5 which connects to mainland Chile via ferry. Currently the Chacao Channel bridge is under construction and is expected to connect Chiloe Island to the mainland in 2025. From Castro nearly every village of Chiloé is easily accessible on a good paved road. There are good bus connections to most of the villages as well. The bus terminal is close to the central town square.

Since November 2012, domestic flights connecting the Island with the rest of the country arrive to Mocopulli Airport four times a week.

The railway line from Castro to Ancud was destroyed by the earthquake in 1960 and not rebuilt.

== Sports ==
The city is home to Deportes Castro, a professional basketball team that was the 2012 champion of the Liga Nacional de Básquetbol de Chile. The team plays its home games in the Gimnasio Fiscal de Castro.

== Climate ==
Castro has a warm-summer Mediterranean climate (Köppen: Csb), (Trewartha: Dolk), closely bordering on a temperate oceanic climate (Köppen: Cfb).

Daily mean temperatures range from 7.3 °C (45.1 °F) in July to 15.9 °C (60.6 °F) in both January and February.

Castro receives, on average, 1,598.5 millimetres (62.93 in) of precipitation annually. The driest month of the year is February, with 39.7 millimetres (1.56 in) average precipitation and the wettest is July, with 293.1 millimetres (11.54 in) average precipitation.

Climate data for Castro
Month	Jan	Feb	Mar	Apr	May	Jun	Jul	Aug	Sep	Oct	Nov	Dec	Year
Mean daily maximum °C (°F)	20.1 (68.2)	20.4 (68.7)	19.0 (66.2)	15.7 (60.3)	13.1 (55.6)	11.2 (52.2)	10.9 (51.6)	11.2 (52.2)	12.8 (55.0)	15.5 (59.9)	18.2 (64.8)	20.0 (68.0)	15.7 (60.2)
Daily mean °C (°F)	15.9 (60.6)	15.9 (60.6)	14.2 (57.6)	11.2 (52.2)	9.0 (48.2)	7.5 (45.5)	7.3 (45.1)	7.5 (45.5)	9.1 (48.4)	11.4 (52.5)	14.3 (57.7)	15.7 (60.3)	11.6 (52.9)
Mean daily minimum °C (°F)	7.7 (45.9)	7.6 (45.7)	6.4 (43.5)	4.3 (39.7)	3.4 (38.1)	2.3 (36.1)	2.3 (36.1)	2.1 (35.8)	2.6 (36.7)	4.1 (39.4)	5.9 (42.6)	7.4 (45.3)	4.7 (40.4)
Average precipitation mm (inches)	102.6 (4.04)	39.7 (1.56)	72.8 (2.87)	147.6 (5.81)	226.8 (8.93)	193.8 (7.63)	293.1 (11.54)	204.0 (8.03)	133.5 (5.26)	83.9 (3.30)	43.5 (1.71)	57.2 (2.25)	1,598.5 (62.93)
Average relative humidity (%)	76	77	79	84	87	89	88	87	84	78	80	77	82
Source: Bioclimatografia de Chile

== Notable persons ==
=== Miss Earth ===
Hil Hernández, Miss Earth 2006
