= Chile Route 9 =

Highway in Chile

Route 9
- Ruta 9
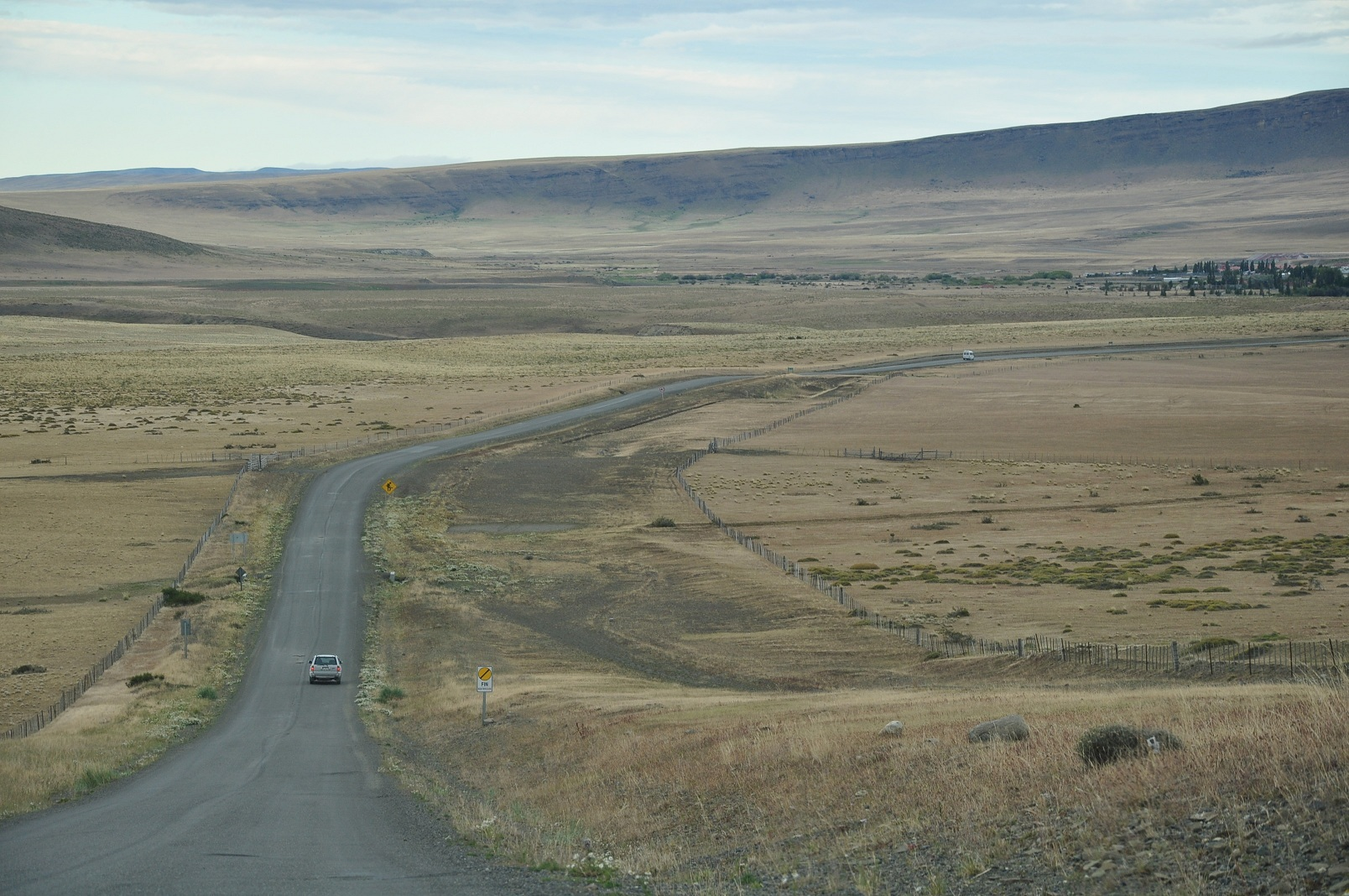
- Route 9 crossing Patagonian grasslands near Cerro Castillo.

Location
- Country: Chile

Highway system
- Highways in Chile

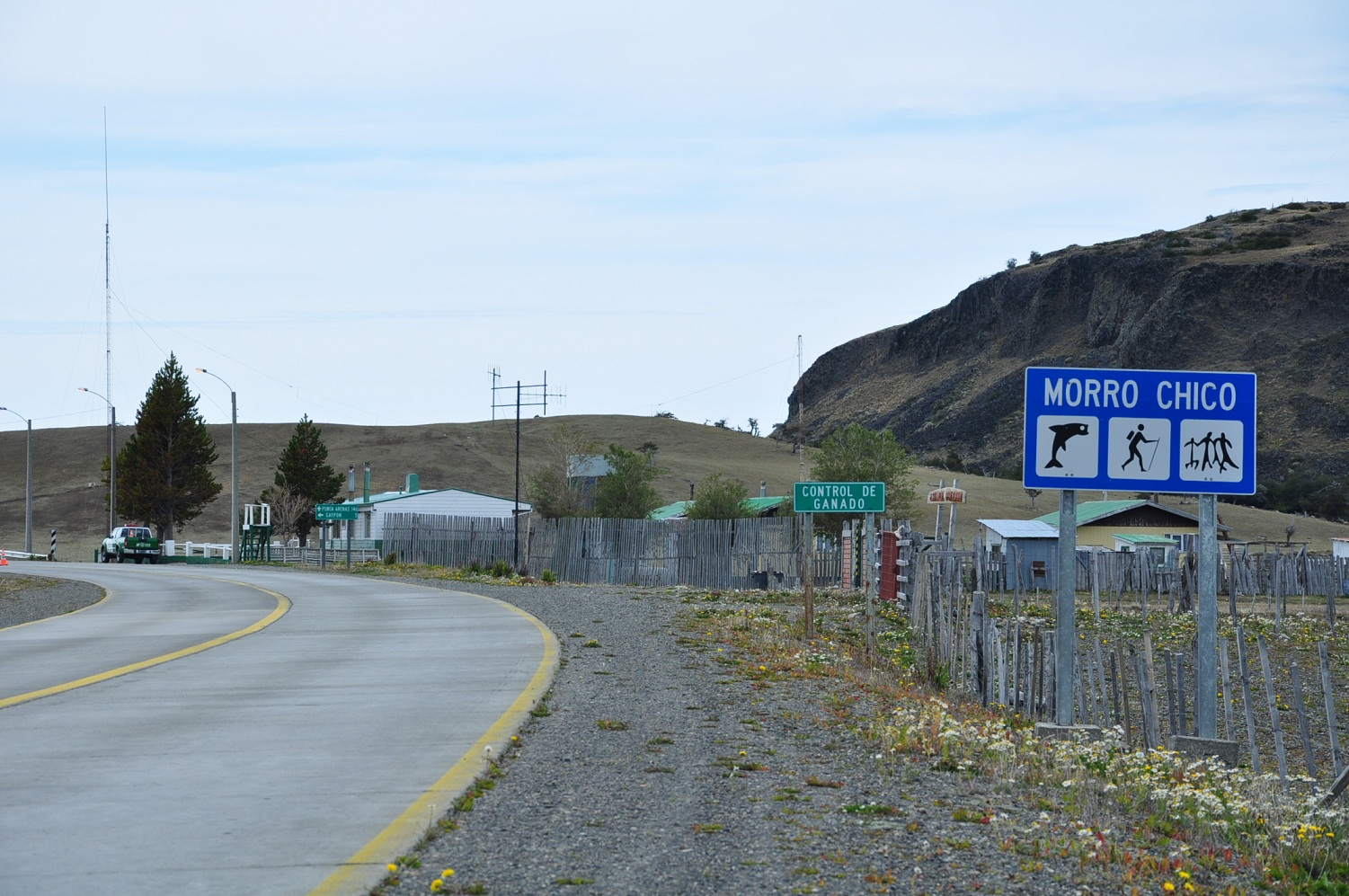
View of the village of Morro Chico halfway between Puerto Natales and Punta Arenas. The road in picture is Route 9-CH

The Chilean highway Route 9 (9-CH) runs from the Brunswick Peninsula south of Punta Arenas north to Paso Baguales Oriental at the border with Argentina in Torres del Paine commune. Route 9-CH is the main highway of Magallanes y la Antártica Chilena Region, and to travel between Route 9-CH and Chilean highways north of Magallanes y la Antártica Chilena Region vehicles have to pass through Argentina.

During the White Earthquake of 1995 a number of cars and two buses with passengers were trapped in the snow along the route.

== Places along the highway ==
- Punta Arenas
- Villa Tehuelches
- Puerto Natales
- Cerro Castillo
