= Chile Route 1 =

Highway in Chile

Route 1
- Ruta 1

Location
- Country: Chile

Highway system
- Highways in Chile

Chile Route 1, known locally as Ruta 1, is a longitudinal national route that is located in the Norte Grande of Chile, in the regions of Tarapacá and Antofagasta. In its length of 598.6 km, it links Iquique with route 5 through a parallel to the coast of Pacific Ocean joining two of the most important cities in northern Chile. It serves as an alternative to the passage through Route 5 in the middle of Atacama Desert.

During its construction several archaeological sites corresponding to tombs were destroyed. Metal objects are known to have been retrieved from the tombs.
