= Chile Route 12 =

Highway in Chile

Route 12
- Ruta 12

Location
- Country: Chile

Highway system
- Highways in Chile

Chile Route 12, known locally as Ruta 12, is a national route that is located in the Norte Grande of Chile, in the region of Arica y Parinacota. In its course of 3.8 km, it is completely paved and connects Route 5 and Arica with the Chacalluta International Airport, the northernmost airport in the country.
