= Torres del Paine (disambiguation) =

Torres del Paine are impressive mountains peaks located in the Magallanes and Antártica Chilena Region. The peaks give the names for:

- Torres del Paine (commune), the Chilean commune of the region
- Cordillera del Paine, the mountain range that contains the peaks
- Torres del Paine National Park, where the range is located
