= Chile Route 68 =

Highway in Chile

Route 68
- Ruta 68

Route information
- Length: 110.21 km (68.48 mi)

Major junctions
- From: Avenida Libertador General Bernardo O'Higgins
- To: Valparaíso

Location
- Country: Chile

Highway system
- Highways in Chile

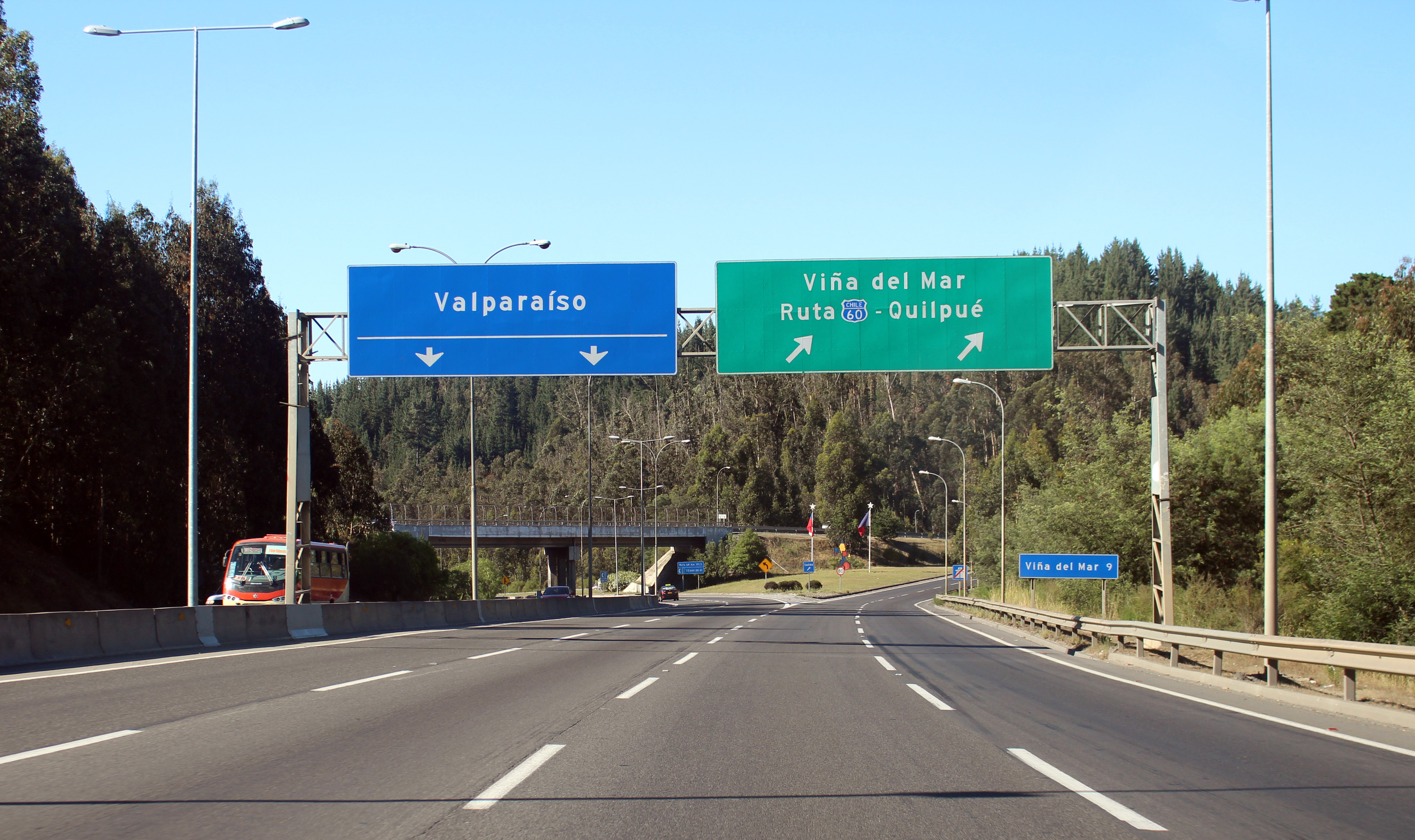
Route 68 at the junction with Route 60

Chile Route 68 (Ruta 68) is a highway in central Chile. It runs 110.21 km (68.48 mi) from Santiago to Valparaíso.

== Route description ==
It begins at the western terminus of Avenida Libertador General Bernardo O'Higgins. In its first kilometers the highway is straight and has three lanes in each direction. Shortly after its junction with Vespucio Norte Express, Route 68 narrows to two lanes in each direction. After this, the highway meets Costanera Norte and crosses the Mapocho River. After some kilometers, Route 68 passes through the tunnels Lo Prado I and Lo Prado II, with lengths of 2,808 m (9,213 ft) and 2,823 m (9,262 ft) respectively, which are built through the Chilean Coastal Range.

Going westward, Route 68 descends into the Curacaví Valley and bypasses the small city of the same name. After this, the highway is carried by another pair of tunnels side by side, which straddle the border between Santiago Metropolitan Region and Valparaíso Region and are called Zapata I and Zapata II. After leaving the tunnels, the highway continues northwest through the Casablanca Valley and borders the city of Casablanca. The highway enters the Lago Peñuelas National Reserve before continuing into Placilla de Peñuelas.

Just north of Placilla, Route 68 intersects with the Acceso Sur a Valparaíso, formerly known as Camino La Pólvora, which is the new access road to the port the Valparaíso. From there the highway curves towards the north and splits into a Y-junction. The eastern road is named Variante Agua Santa and serves as access to the city of Viña del Mar. From this road branches off Route Las Palmas, which is part of Chile Route 60. The final stretch of Route 68, named Santos Ossa, makes a steep descent into Valparaíso.
