= Chiloé Wind Farm =

Planned wind farm in south-central Chile

Coordinates: 41°53′4.61″S 73°59′44.25″W

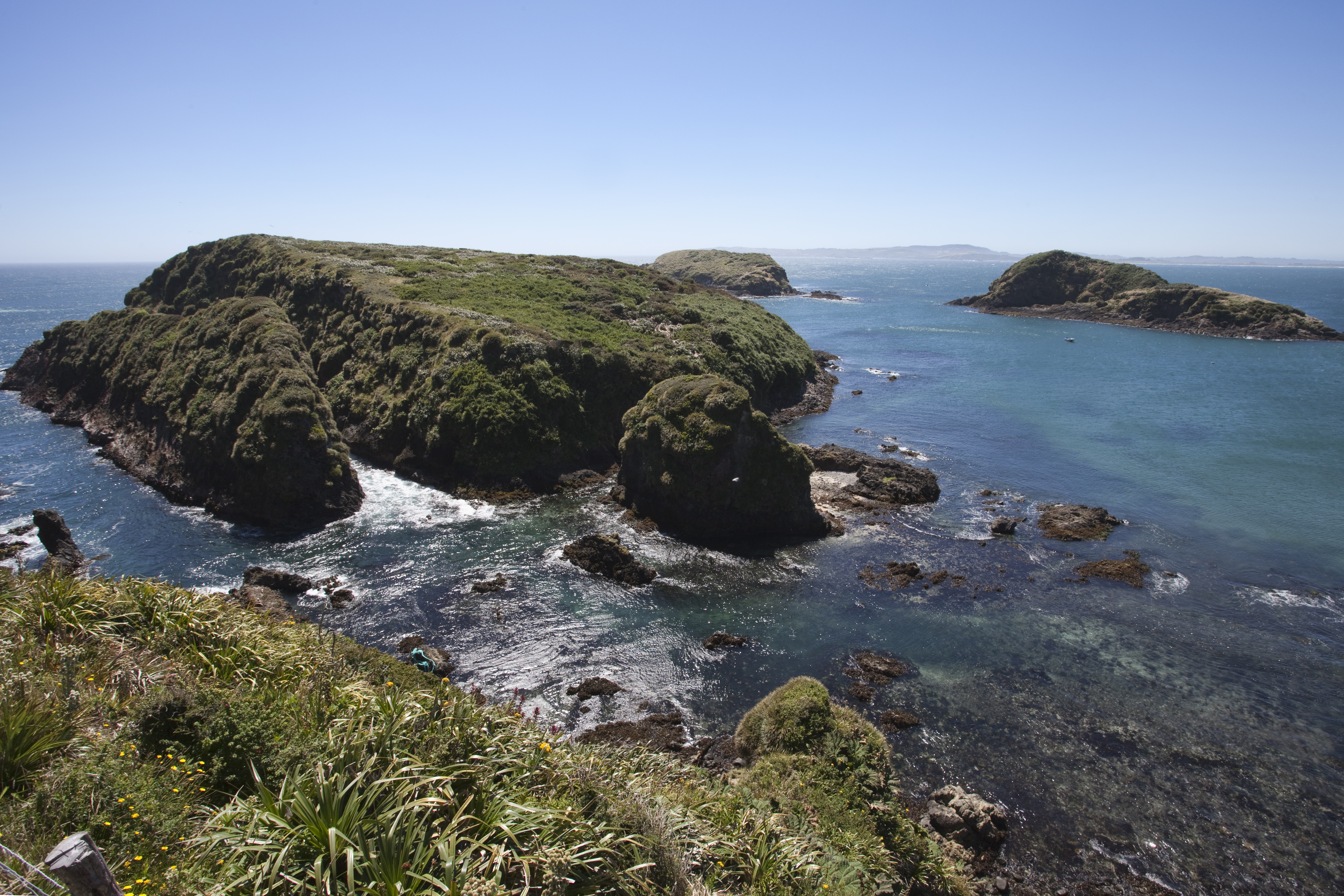
View of the coast of Chiloé Island west of Ancud.

Chiloé Wind Farm (Spanish: Parque Eólico Chiloé) is a wind farm planned to be constructed by chilean renewable energy developer Ecopower in a sector called Mar Brava west of Ancud in Chiloé Island, Chile. Chiloé Wind Farm is one four large wind farm projects approved by Sistema de Evaluación de Impacto Ambiental (SEIA) in the period of 2010–2017, and if constructed it would be the largest wind farm in the whole Chiloé Archipelago. The project included the construction of 42 wind turbines and with a power generation of 100 MW.

The project has been met by significant opposition as it is claimed it would destroy "pristine" landscapes and reduce their potential for tourism. The investment in the project is estimated to be about 250 million US dollars (2018) financed by Chilean and Swedish sources. Supporters of the project claim the project would together with Chacao Channel bridge help end Chiloé Island's isolation. It is also claimed it will give the power outage-prone island more reliable electricity sources and independence. At least initially, some environmentalists supported the project as it was "clean energy".

The project was first heard of in 2007, and was subsequently presented by the mayor of Ancud Pablo Ossio (DC) as being in negotiation. In 2019 the Chilean state sued Ecopower for not paying the rent for the sites of the project.
