= Chile Route 206 =

Highway in Chile

Route 206
- Ruta 206
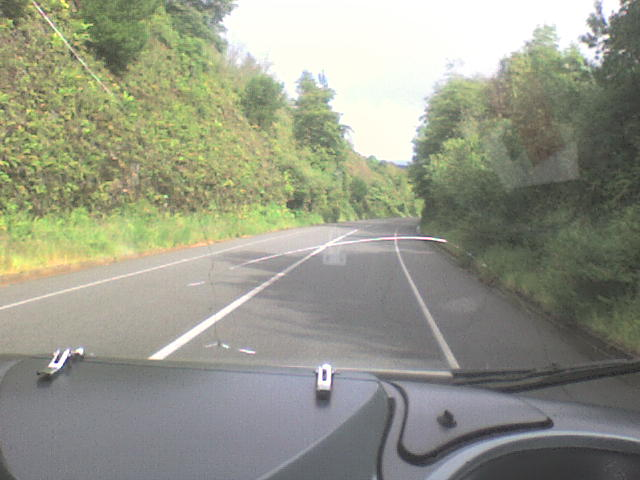

Location
- Country: Chile

Highway system
- Highways in Chile

Route 206-CH is a branch line road going northwest from Chile Highway 5 at Paillaco. The route is paved and connects the city of Valdivia with the town of Paillaco. Near Valdivia the road runs across wetlands formed by subsidence during the 1960 Valdivia earthquake.
