= Church of San Francisco, Castro =

Church of Castro
UNESCO World Heritage Site
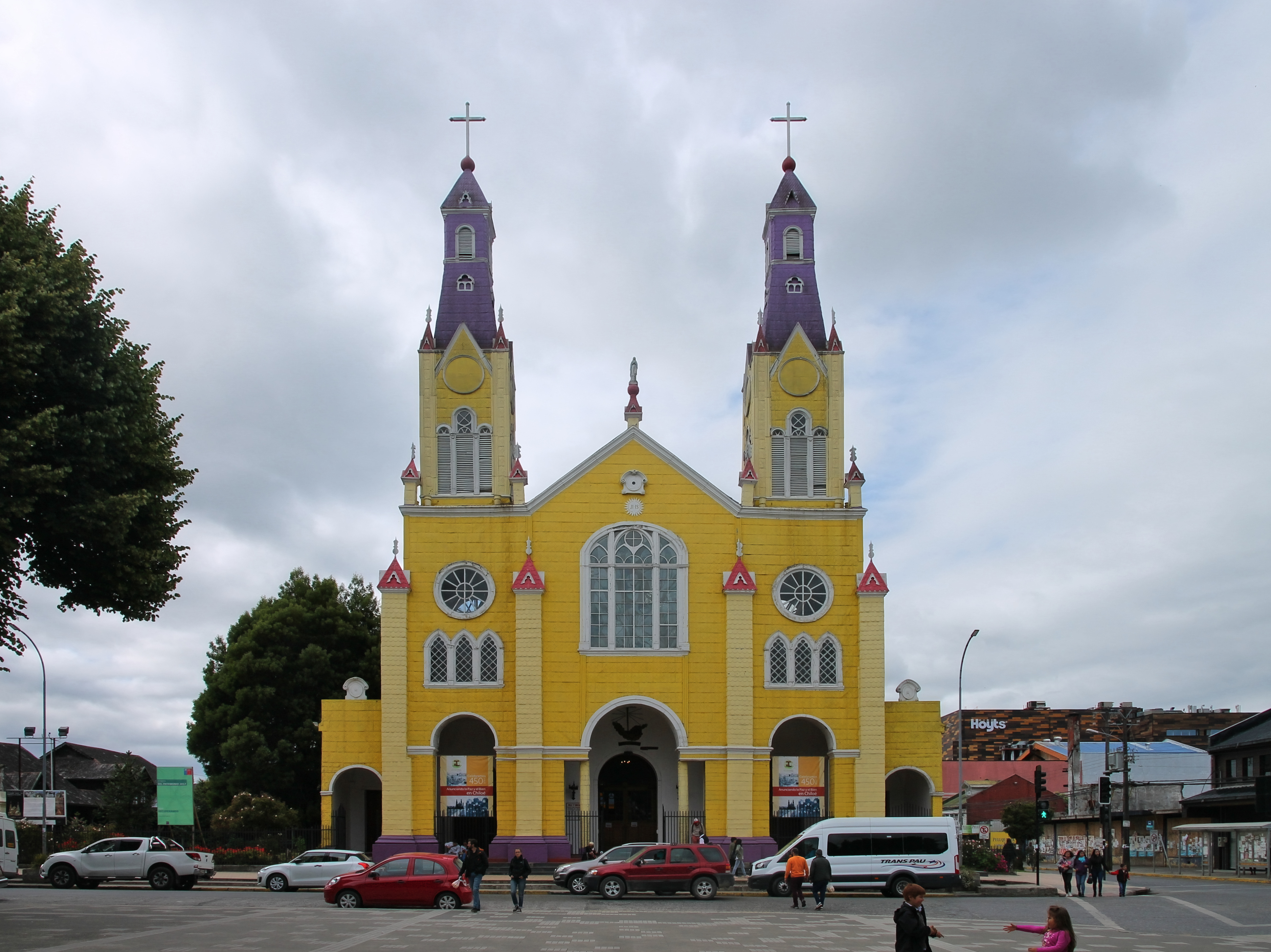
- Church of San Francisco facade

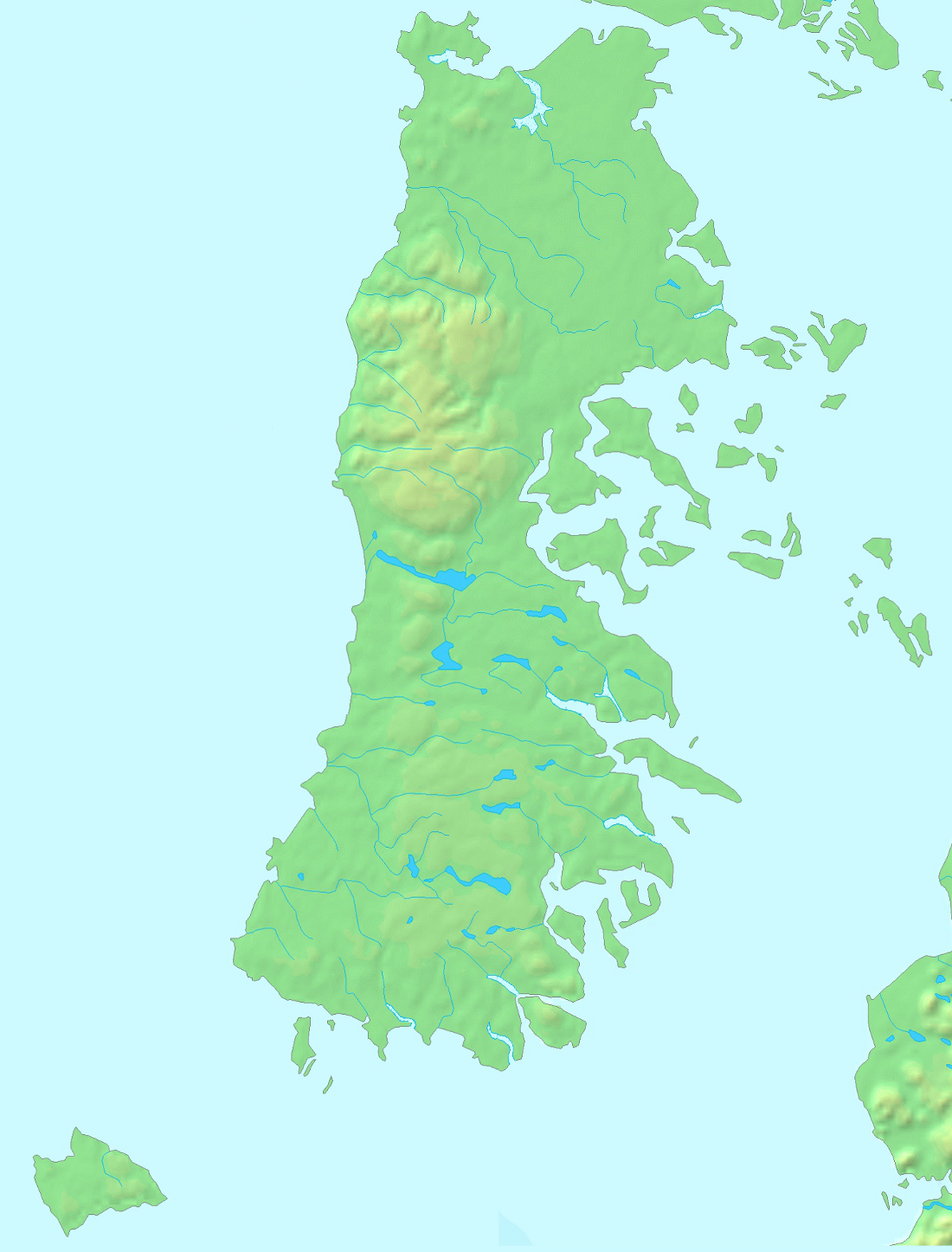
- Location within Chiloé Location within Los Lagos Location within Chile
- Location: Castro, Chiloé Island, Chiloé Province, Los Lagos Region, Chile
- Part of: Churches of Chiloé
- Criteria: Cultural: (ii), (iii)
- Reference: 971-003
- Inscription: 2000 (24th Session)
- Area: 0.6727 ha (1.662 acres)
- Coordinates: 42°28′53″S 73°45′50″W

The Church of San Francisco (Spanish, Iglesia de San Francisco), located on one side of the Plaza de Armas of Castro, Chile, is the main Catholic church of Chiloé's capital. This 1912 building has a surface area of 1,404 m^{2}, a width of 52 m and a height of 27 m. The dome above the church's presbytery is 32 m high and the height of its towers is 42 m. The church is also known as the Iglesia Apóstol Santiago (St James Church) and erroneously as the “cathedral”, which is actually to be found in Ancud, headquarters of the diocese of the same name. The Church of San Francisco does, however, lead one of the 24 parishes that form this diocese.

The church was declared a Chilean National Monument in 1979 and UNESCO World Heritage Site on 30 November 2000.

== History ==
Castro is Chile's third oldest city in continued existence. It was founded in February, 1567 by Martín Ruiz de Gamboa, who was sent by his father-in-law, temporary governor of Chile Rodrigo de Quiroga, to establish a city on the Chiloé Archipelago called Santiago de Castro. That same year, a church was built with the name of the apostle Saint James (Santiago in Spanish), to be used in the evangelization of the indigenous peoples of Chiloé. The church burned down and was rebuilt a number of times until its reconstruction in 1771. It was used thereafter as a parish administered by the Jesuits. It burned down again in 1902, and was rebuilt in the style of a Gothic stone church, but using the island's traditional wood craftsmanship. The church's construction was overseen by the priest Fray Ángel Custodio Subiabre Oyarzún, in charge of the church from 1910 to 1912.

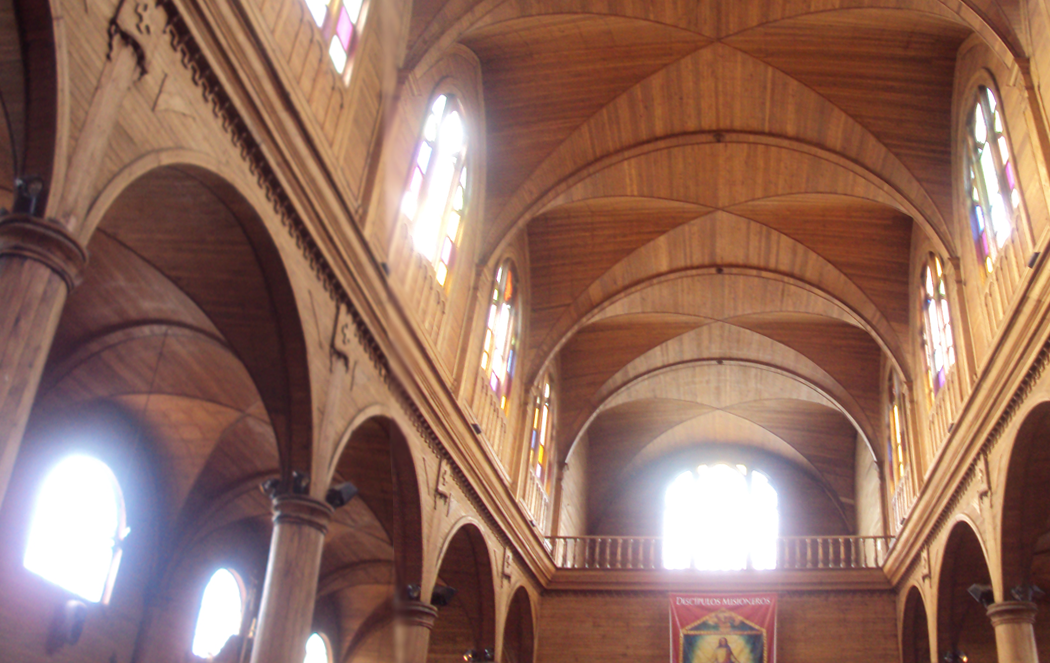
Church ceiling.

== Architecture ==
The church's design is the work of Italian architect Eduardo Provasoli, and rather than the typical style of the other churches of Chiloé, the Church of San Francisco's style is Neo-Gothic. The church was built by carpenters from Chiloé under supervision from Salvador Sierpe.

In the structures, the carpenters used wood from the area such as the alerce, cypress, coigüe and other native wood. The interiors are made of rauli beech and olivillo; however the facade, roof and exterior lining are sheets of galvanized iron.

Inside the church is an image of the Archangel Michael victorious over Satan, an image of Saint Alberto Hurtado and a replica of the image of Jesus found in the Church of Caguach in Quinchao, Chiloé.

Its facade is often painted with bright colours, making it a highlight of Castro's Plaza de Armas.

== Gallery ==
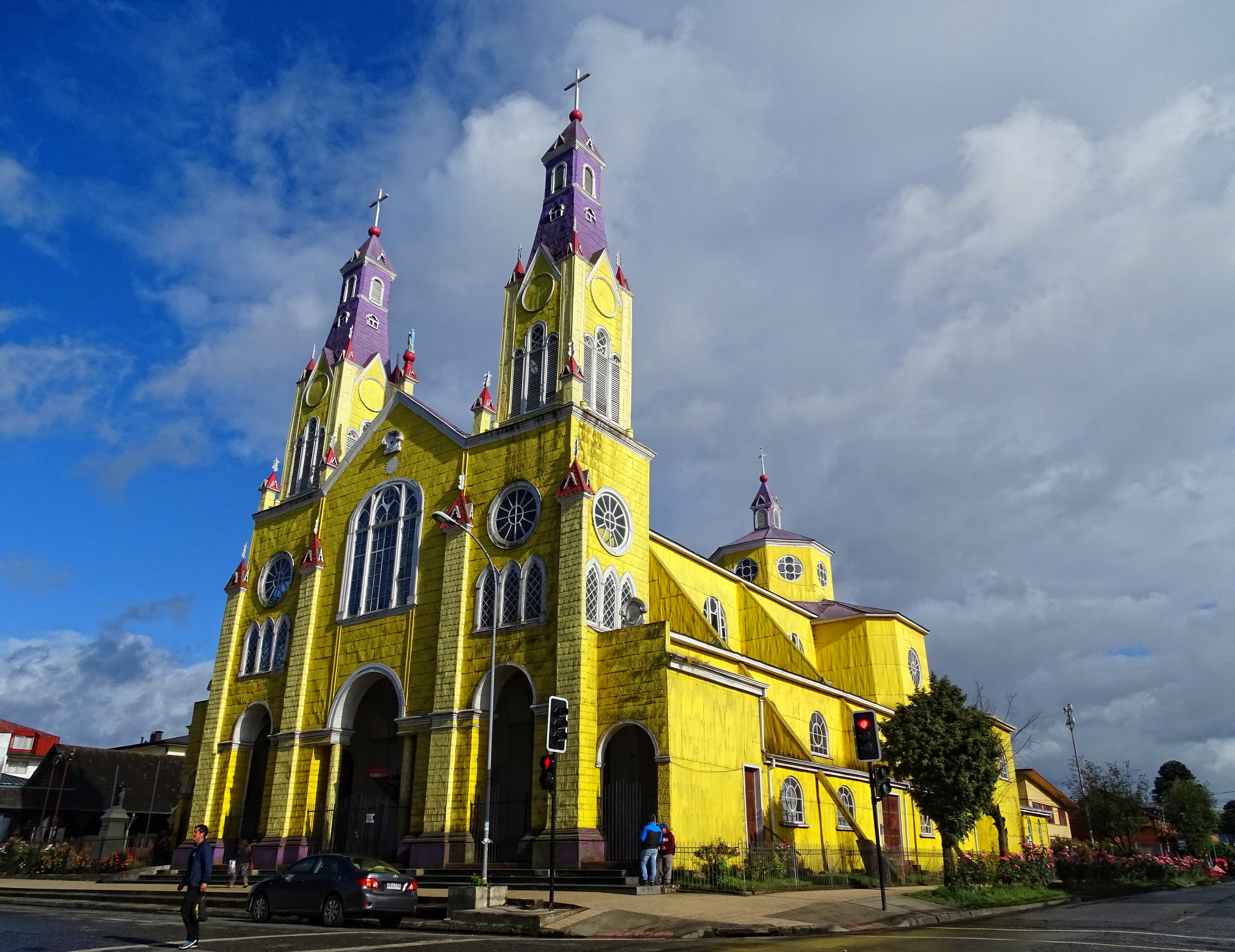

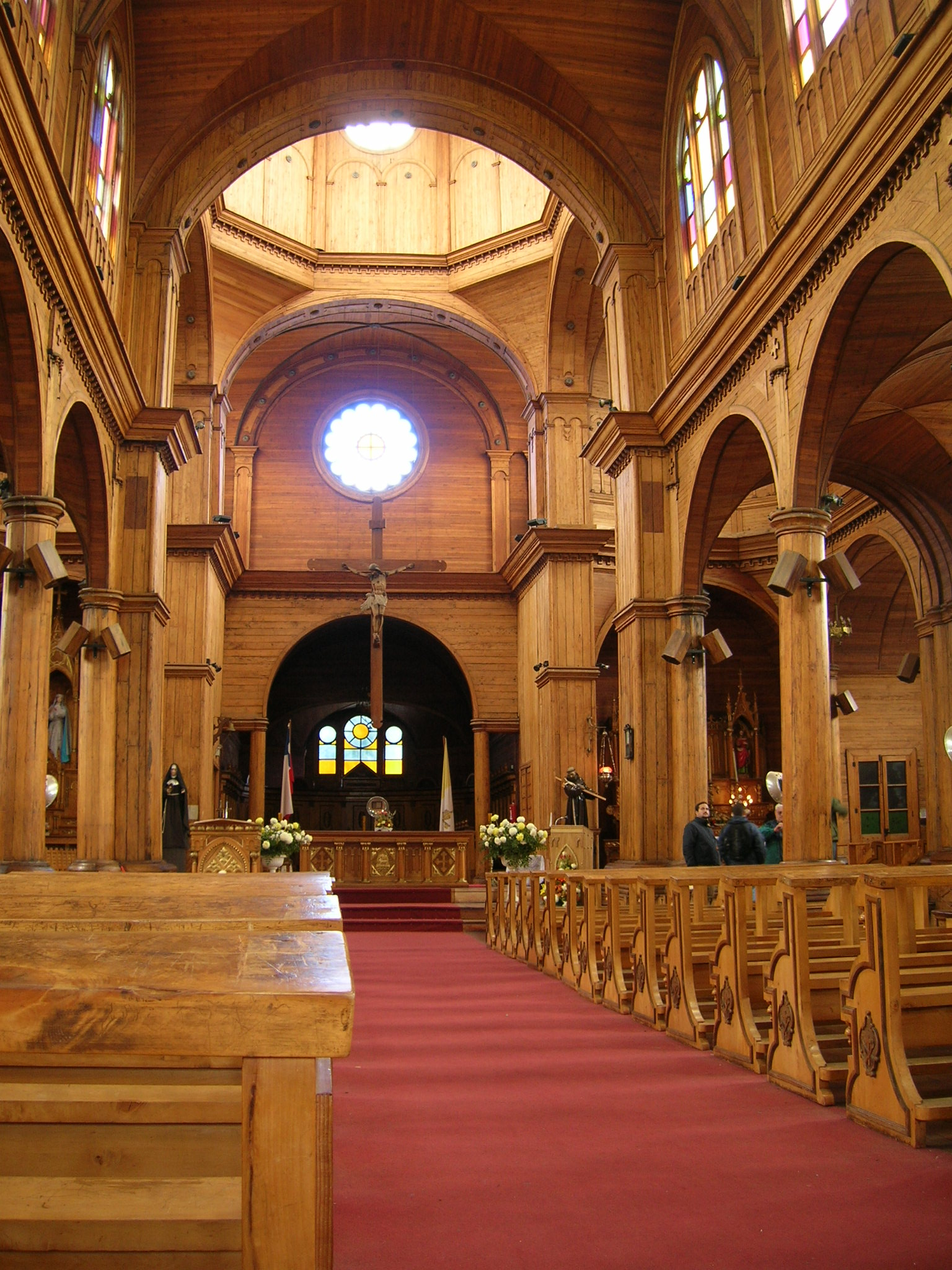
Church interior.

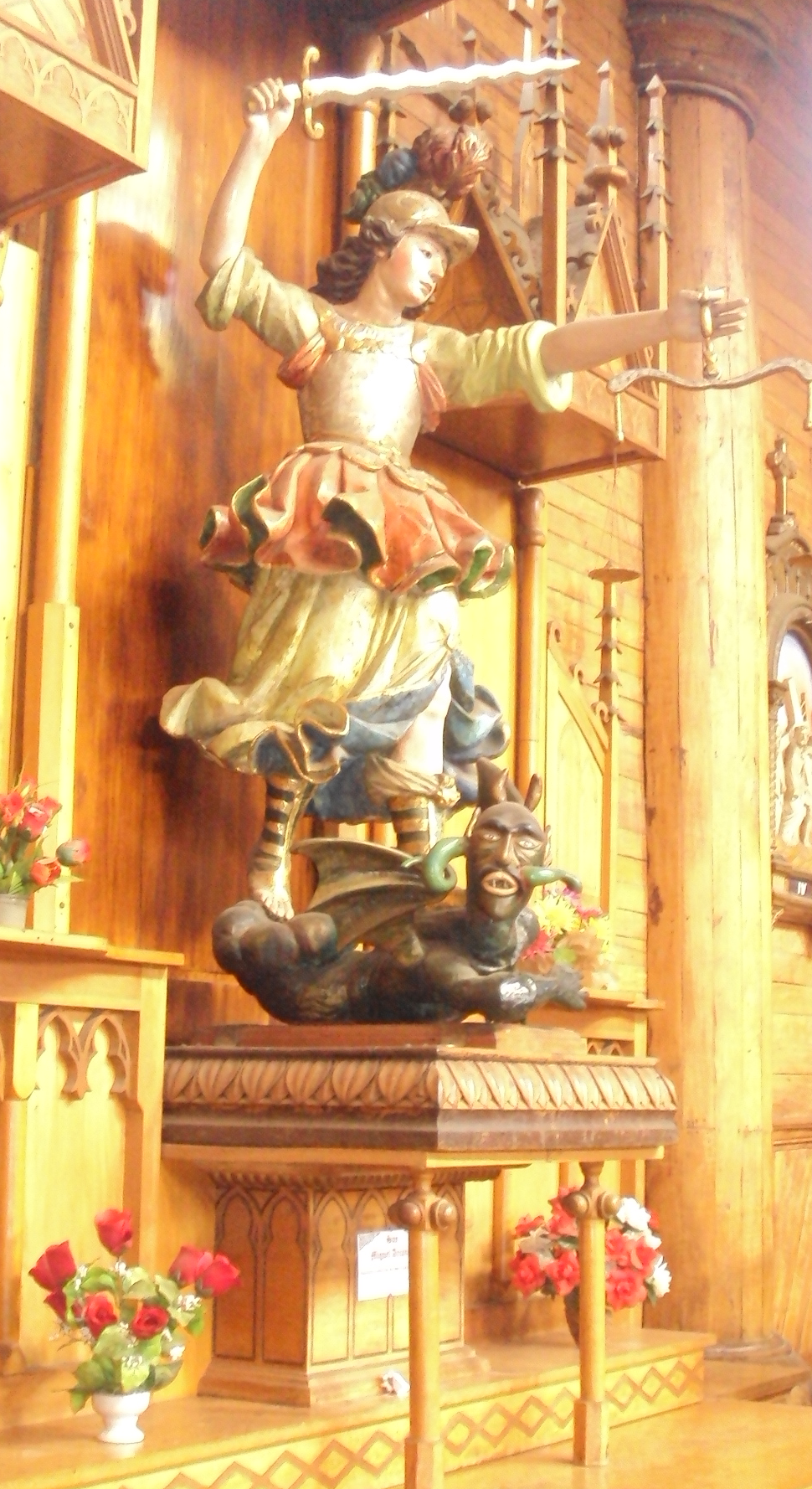
Altar of Archangel Michael.
