= Chile Route 8 =

Proposed highway in Chile

Carretera Austral (Route 8)
- Ruta 8

Route information
- Maintained by Ministry of Public Works and the Chilean Army
- Length: 786 km (488 mi)

Major junctions
- From: Punta Pisagua, Aysén Region
- To: Staines Fjord, Magallanes and Chilean Antarctica Region

Location
- Country: Chile

Highway system
- Highways in Chile

Chile Route 8 (CH-8; Ruta 8 in Spanish) is a proposed Chilean highway and part of the Carretera Austral, located in the southern region of Chile. The projected route spans 786 kilometers and aims to connect the Aysén and Magallanes regions by land and ferry routes. It starts at Punta Pisagua, near the Jorge Montt Glacier in Aysén and ends at Staines Fjord in the Magallanes Region, running west of the Southern Patagonian Ice Field and east of Puerto Edén. The project is expected to take at least 52 years to complete and cost over US$8.2 billion.

Both the Chilean Army and the Ministry of Public Works have undertaken fieldwork to support the planned route.

The route was initially planned in 1980 as part of the original Carretera Austral project and remains the only major segment not yet constructed.

The route includes at least six ferry crossings, at locations such as Ventisquero or Jorge Montt Glacier, Témpanos Fjord, Eyre Fjord, Penguin and Europa Fjords, Peel Fjord, and Última Esperanza Sound.

== Geographic areas ==
=== Aysén Region ===
- Punta Pisagua

=== Magallanes and Chilean Antarctica Region ===
- Southern Patagonian Ice Field
- Puerto Edén
- Puerto Natales
