= Cerro Castillo, Chile =

Place in Última Esperanza, Magallanes, Chile

Coordinates: 51°15′33″S 72°20′42″W

Cerro Castillo
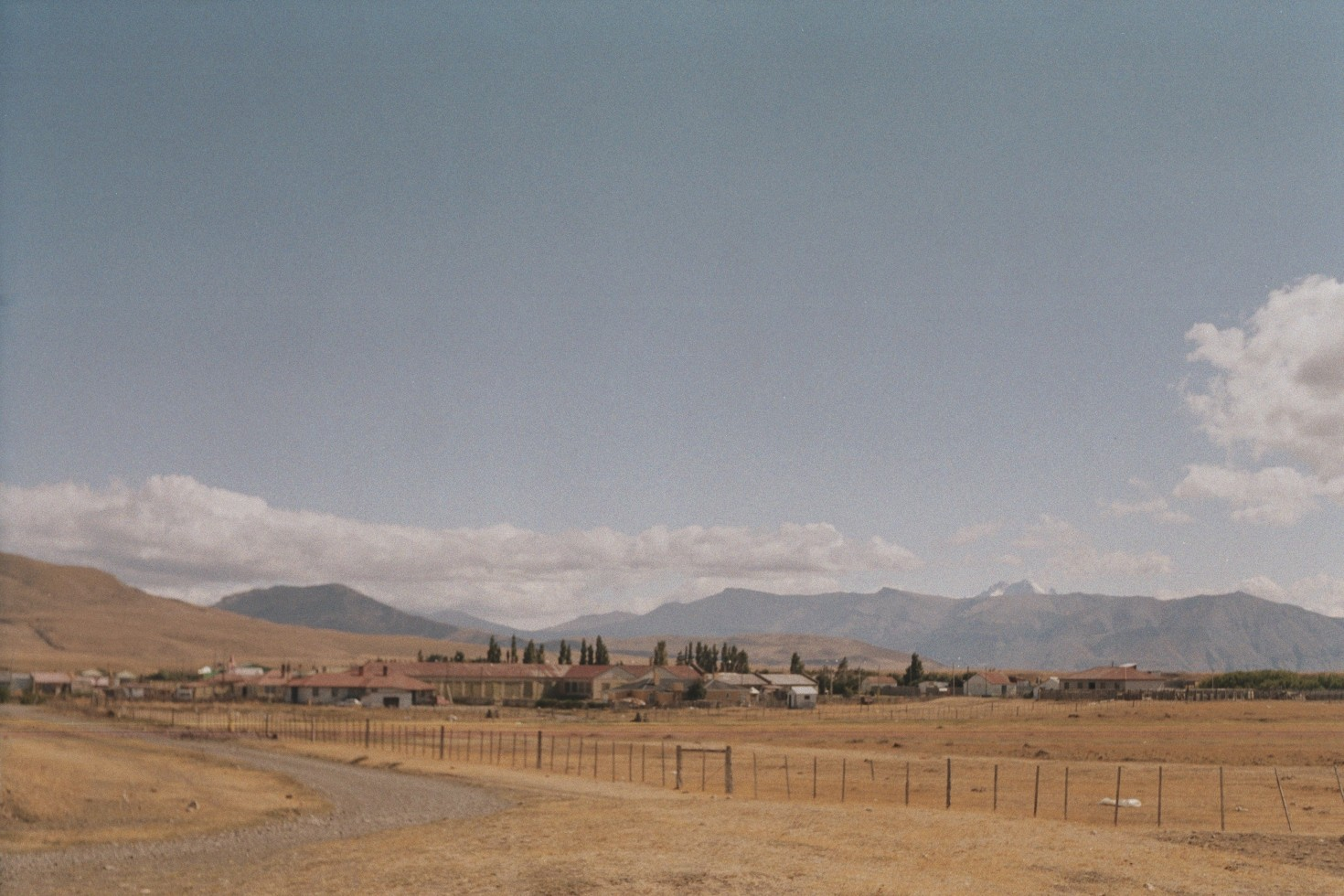
- Interactive map of Cerro Castillo
- Region: Magallanes
- Province: Última Esperanza
- Municipalidad: Torres del Paine
- Comuna: Torres del Paine

Government
  - Type: Municipalidad
  - Alcalde: Anahí Cárdenas Rodríguez

Population (2002 census)
  - Total: 163
- Time zone: UTC−04:00 (Chilean Standard)
  - Summer (DST): UTC−03:00 (Chilean Daylight)
- Area code: Country + town = 56 + 61

Cerro Castillo is a hamlet (Spanish: caserío) southeast of Torres del Paine National Park, and is the head of Torres del Paine commune, in the Magallanes Region.

The village is close to the Argentine border. The Chilean customs and immigration offices serving the border crossing (officially known as Río Don Guillermo) are located in the village.

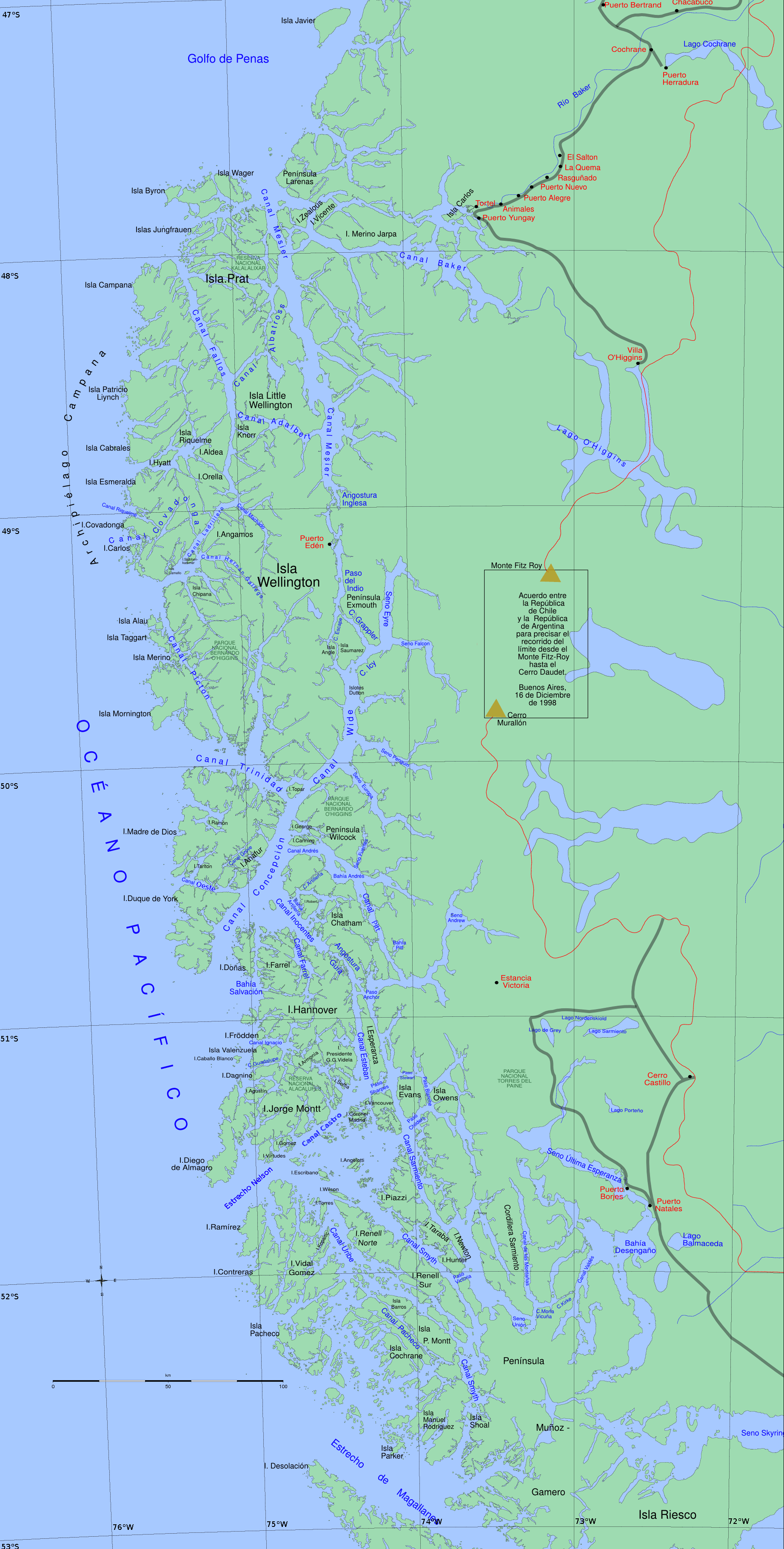
