= Estero de Castro =

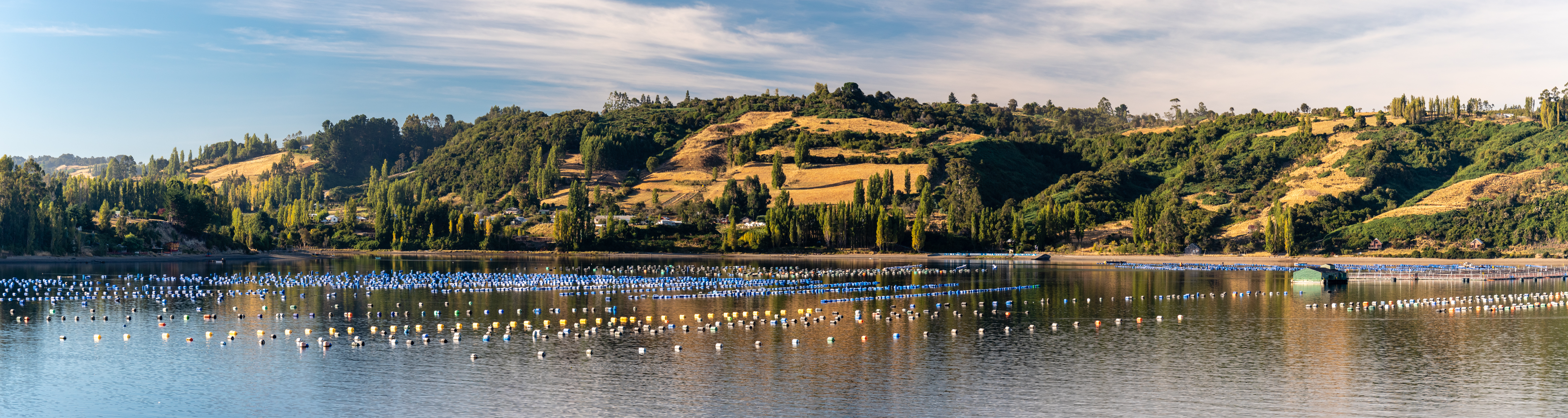
Early autumn picture of a mussel farm in Estero de Castro.

Estero de Castro is a 20 km long inlet of the Sea of Chiloé into Chiloé Island. Castro, the capital of Chiloé Province is located on its western shores.
