= Última Esperanza Province =

Última Esperanza Provincia de Última Esperanza
- Province
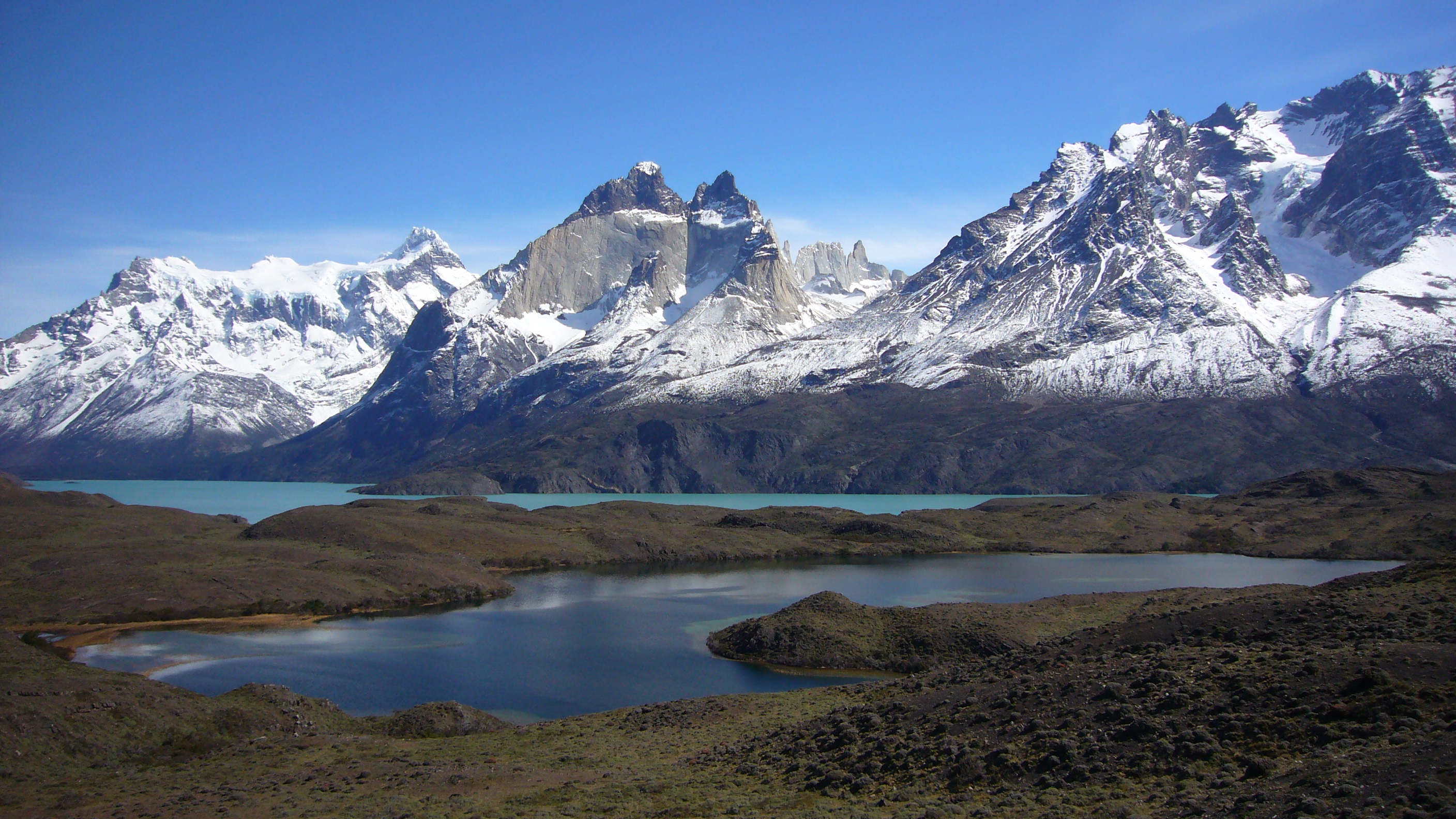
- Torres del Paine National Park

- Seal

- Location in the Magallanes and Antartica Chilena Region

- Location in Chile
- Coordinates: 50°47′S 74°06′W
- Country: Chile
- Region: Magallanes y Antártica Chilena
- Capital: Puerto Natales
- Communes: Puerto Natales; Torres del Paine

Government
  - Type: Provincial
  - Provincial Presidential Delegate: Ericka Farías Guerra

Area
  - Total: 55,443.9 km^{2} (21,407.0 sq mi)

Population (2012 Census)
  - Total: 18,685
  - Rank: 2
  - Density: 0.33701/km^{2} (0.87284/sq mi)
  - Urban: 16,978
  - Rural: 2,877

Sex
  - Men: 10611
  - Women: 9244
- Time zone: UTC-3 (CLST)
  - Summer (DST): UTC-3 (CLST)
- Area code: 61
- Website: Government of Última Esperanza

Última Esperanza (Spanish: Provincia de Última Esperanza, meaning "Province of the Last Hope") is one of four provinces in the southern Chilean region of Magallanes and Antártica Chilena. The capital is Puerto Natales and it is named after Última Esperanza Sound. A section of its border with Argentina in the Southern Patagonian Ice Field is under dispute.

== Administration ==
As a province, Última Esperanza is a second-level administrative division of Chile, which is further divided into two communes (comunas): Puerto Natales and Torres del Paine. The province is administered by a presidentially appointed governor. Ana Ester Mayorga Bahamonde was appointed governor by president Sebastián Piñera.

== Noted features ==
Within this province, the noted Torres del Paine National Park, Cerro Torre and Cerro Chaltén is located, comprising some of the most spectacular mountain peaks of South America. Also part of the biggest non-polar glacier, the Southern Patagonian Ice Field is within Última Esperanza. Cueva del Milodón Natural Monument, where prehistoric human occupation has been documented, is also within this province.
