= Costanera Norte =

Privatized expressway in Chile

Location
- Country: Chile

Highway system
- Highways in Chile

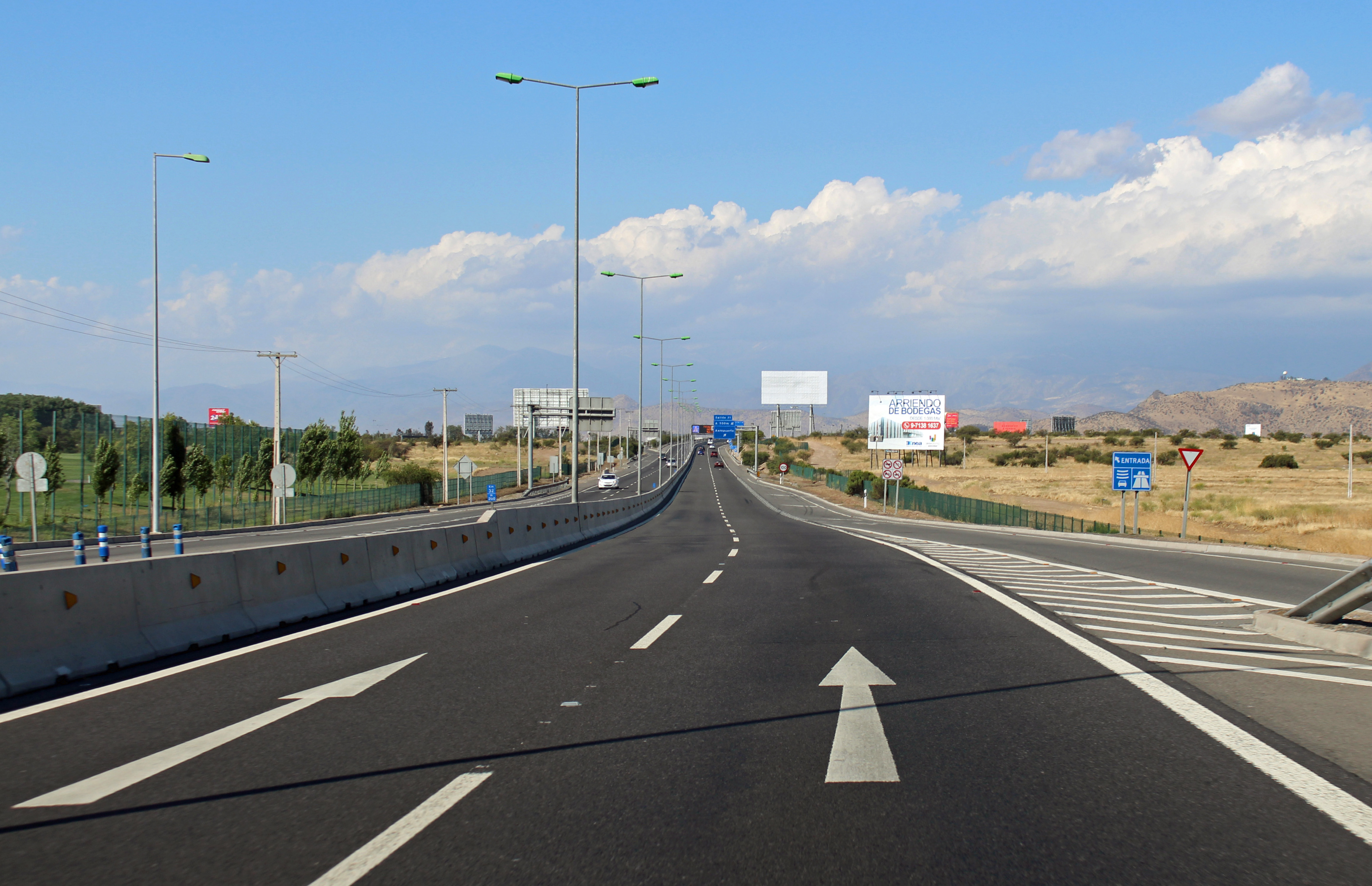
Heading eastbound on the Costanera Norte near exit 33

Costanera Norte (Spanish: Northern bank road) is a 43 km privatized expressway (autopista urbana) in Chile, connecting northern Santiago from east to west, along the northern bank of the Mapocho River, using an electronic toll collection system. It was inaugurated on 12 April 2005.

The expressway connects Santiago's wealthiest districts with the downtown and the airport.
