= Pargua =

- village
- Location in Chile
- Coordinates: 41°47′32″S 73°27′41″W
- Country: Chile
- Region: Los Lagos
- Province: Llanquihue
- Commune: Calbuco
- Elevation: 4 m (13 ft)

Population (2002 Census)
  - Total: 787

Sex
  - Men: 434
  - Women: 353
- Time zone: UTC−4 (CLT)
  - Summer (DST): UTC−3 (CLST)
- Area code: 56 + 65

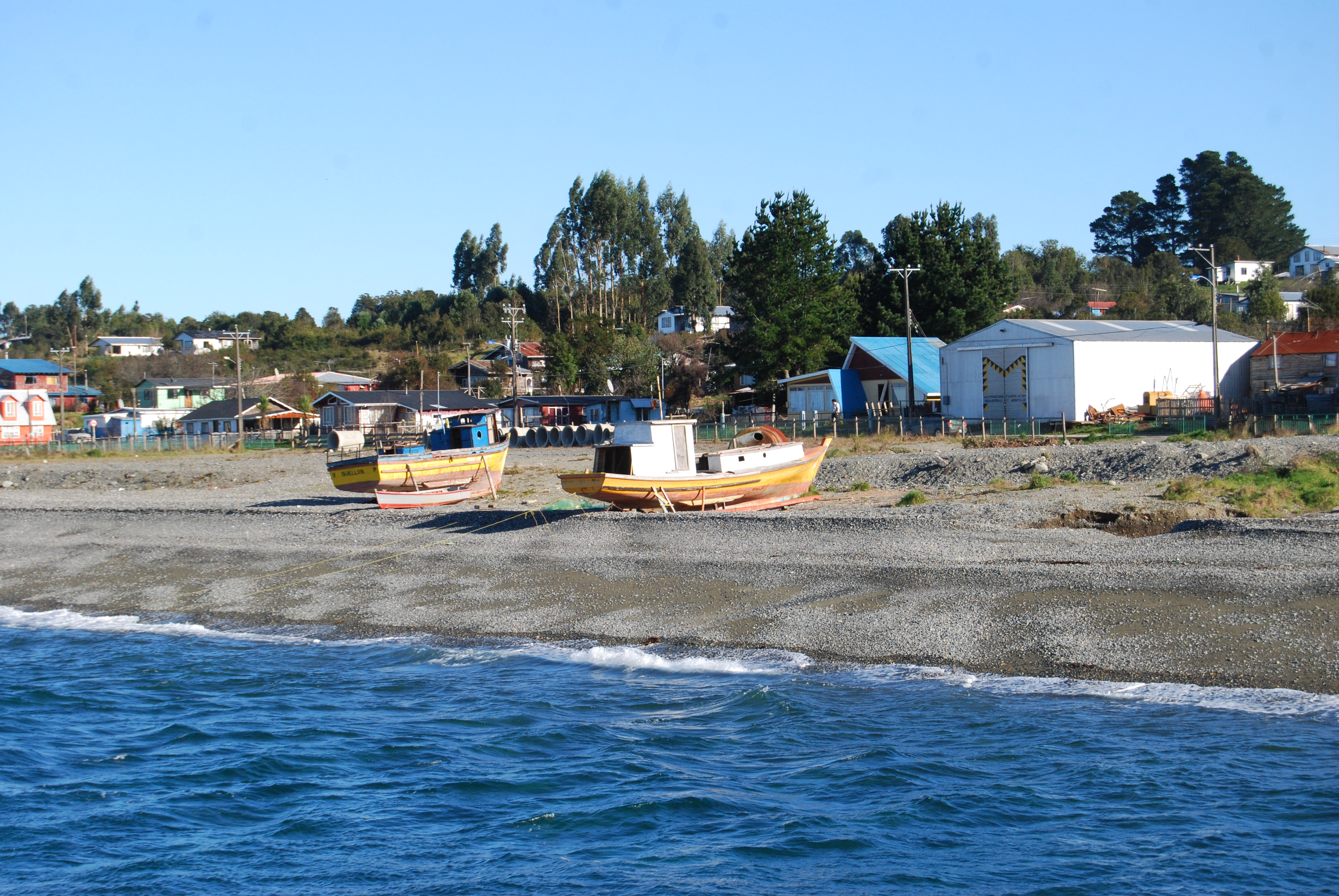
View of Pargua, on the Chacao canal.

Pargua is a village in the commune of Calbuco, in Los Lagos Region of Chile. It is located on the northeast side of the Chacao Channel. Pargua is on Route 5 (Ruta 5 Sur) and a ferry connects the village with the village of Chacao, Ancud Comuna at the northern end of Chiloé Island. There are plans to build the Chacao Channel bridge across the channel to replace the ferry.

== Demographics ==
In the 1992 census Pargua was recorded with a population of 466, 244 men and 222 women, with more than half the population being under the age of fourteen. By 2002 the population had increased to 787, with 434 men and 353 women.
