= List of highways in Chile =

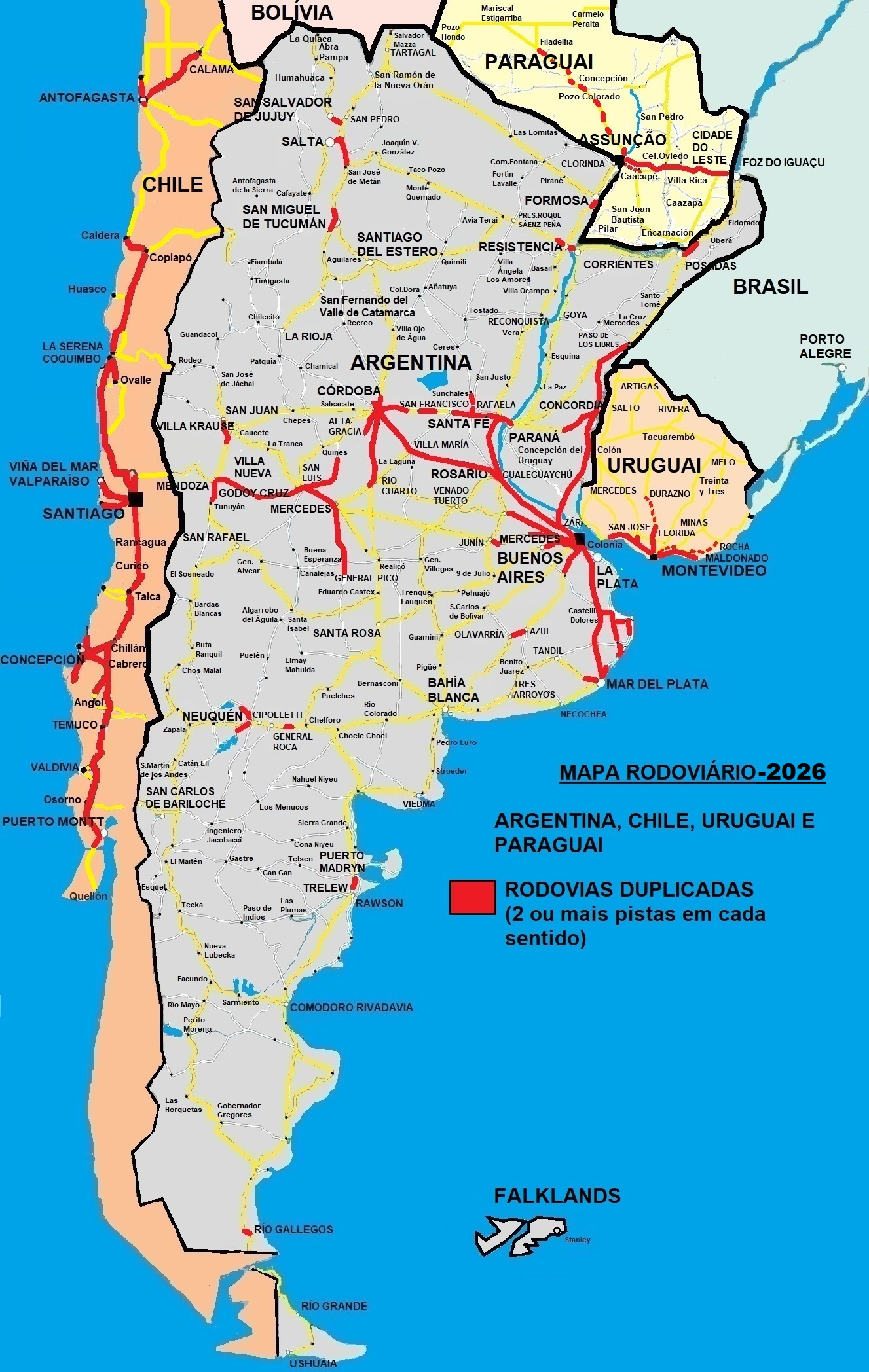
Road system in South America, with divided highways highlighted in red.

The national routes of Chile are formed by the set of roads that connect a regional or provincial capital with a longitudinal or variant road to it, which are named by the President of the Republic, according to the road legislation of Chile. The characteristics that are considered to be catalogued as such are:

- They connect cities with more than 30,000 inhabitants and that are the head of the region.
- They are an important international corridor with neighboring countries for South American integration.
- They connect or access ports where the ships of the State Maritime Company regularly arrive with a longitudinal route or regional heading.
- They connect or access airports that are of regular scale of LAN Chile with the respective city.

A clear example is the Pan American Route 5, which is the main land communication route in Chile, which runs from Arica to the Chiloé archipelago, integrating the Chilean inhabitants from north to south. It also highlights the Austral highway, which extends from Puerto Montt to Villa O'Higgins, for tourism and commercial purposes.

== Coverage ==
Chile has Highway coverage throughout the entire country with the exception of the southern Magallanes Region.

== List ==
This is a list of Chilean Highways:

- Chile Route 1
- Chile Route 5
- Chile Route 6
- Chile Route 7
- Chile Route 8
- Chile Route 9
- Chile Route 11
- Chile Route 12
- Chile Route 15
- Chile Route 16
- Chile Route 23
- Chile Route 24
- Chile Route 25
- Chile Route 27
- Chile Route 30
- Chile Route 31
- Chile Route 41
- Chile Route 43
- Chile Route 45
- Chile Route 57
- Chile Route 60
- Chile Route 64
- Chile Route 66
- Chile Route 68
- Chile Route 70
- Chile Route 78
- Chile Route 90
- Chile Route 115
- Chile Route 126
- Chile Route 128
- Chile Route 146
- Chile Route 148
- Chile Route 150
- Chile Route 152
- Chile Route 158
- Chile Route 156
- Chile Route 160
- Chile Route 164
- Chile Route 180
- Chile Route 181
- Chile Route 182
- Chile Route 199
- Chile Route 202
- Chile Route 203
- Chile Route 206
- Chile Route 215
- Chile Route 225
- Chile Route 226
- Chile Route 235
- Chile Route 240
- Chile Route 243
- Chile Route 245
- Chile Route 255
- Chile Route 257
- Chile Route 265
- Autopista Central
- Costanera Norte
- Autopista del Sol (Chile)
- Autopista del Itata
- Vespucio Norte Express
- Vespucio Sur
- Troncal Sur
