= Chacao Channel bridge =

Bridge under construction in south-central Chile

Chacao Channel Bridge
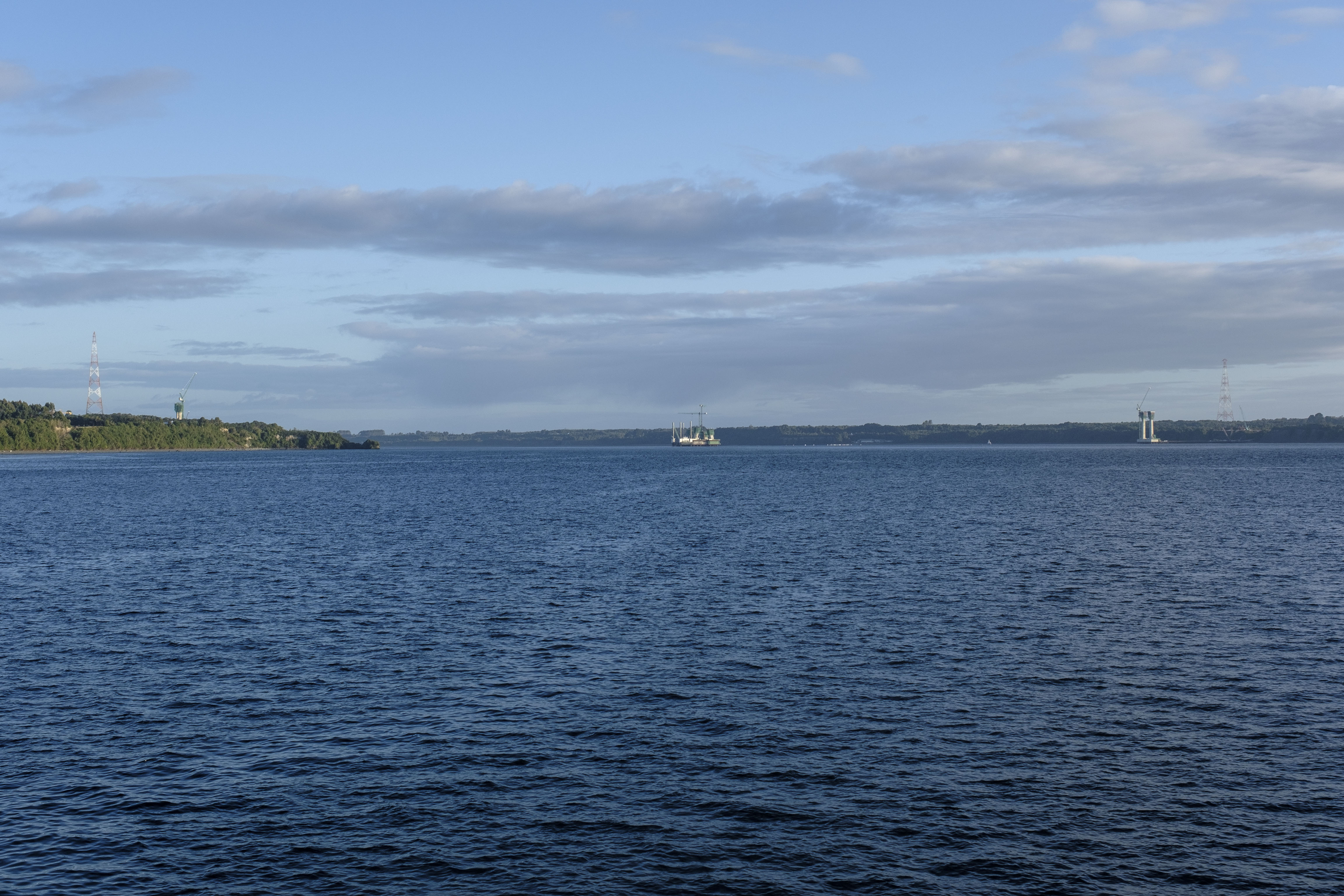
- Coordinates: 41°47′44″S 73°31′22″W
- Crosses: Chacao Channel
- Locale: Pargua–Chacao, Los Lagos Region, Chile

Characteristics
- Design: Suspension bridge
- Total length: 2,634 m (8,642 ft)
- Width: 25 m (82 ft)
- Height: 184 m (604 ft) (north tower); 159.9 m (525 ft) (middle tower); 127.5 m (418 ft) (south tower)
- Longest span: 1,155 m (3,789 ft); 1,055 m (3,461 ft)

History
- Constructed by: Hyundai Engineering & Construction
- Construction start: 2017
- Construction end: 2028

Location
- Interactive map of Chacao Channel Bridge

The Chacao Channel bridge, also known as Chiloé Bicentennial Bridge, is a bridge currently under construction to link the island of Chiloé with mainland Chile crossing the Chacao Channel. It was one of the several projects that were planned to commemorate Chile's bicentennial in 2010. The construction of the bridge began in 2017. When completed as a suspension bridge, it will be the largest such bridge in South America. The opening of the bridge is planned for 2028.

== History ==
Construction of the bridge was scheduled to start in the second half of 2007 and completion was due in late 2012 at an approximate cost of US$410 million. However, on 31 July 2006, the consortium in charge of the project revealed that the total cost of constructing the bridge was US$930 million, which was above the limit of US$607 million imposed by the government. In response, the ministry of Public Works decided not to continue with the project. To compensate the people of Chiloé for not building the bridge, then President Michelle Bachelet promised an upgrade to the island's infrastructure.

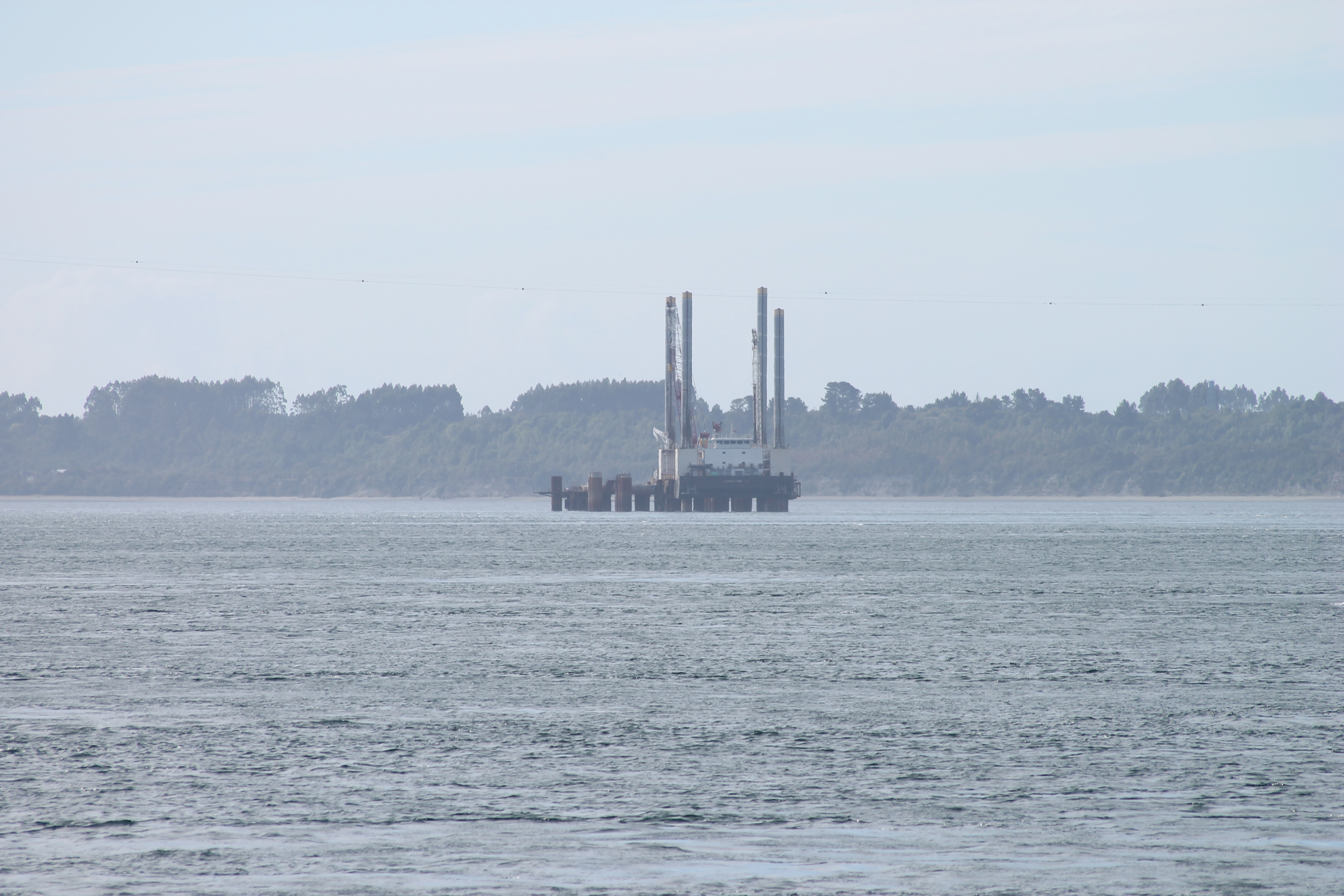
Platform built on top of the Roca Remolinos during the ongoing construction of Chacao Channel bridge.

In June 2009, the Minister of Public Works announced it would revive the project. The bridge would be redesigned (it would no longer be a suspension bridge) and its total cost would be less than in the original design, due to the falling price of steel worldwide. The toll would be also cheaper than a ferry ticket.

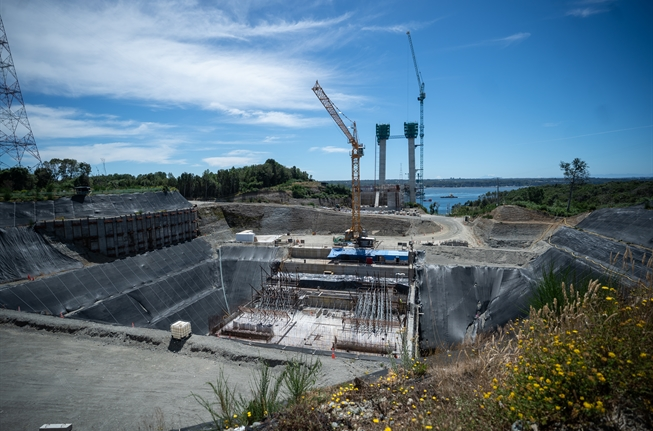
Construction of the bridge

In May 2012, President Sebastián Piñera again revived the project, announcing it would open an international bidding process to present the best solution for the construction of the bridge, with a US$740 million investment limit.

In 2014, Hyundai Engineering & Construction won the contract for the construction of the Chacao Bridge, commissioned by the Ministry of Public Works of Chile.

== Dimensions and features ==
The Chacao Channel bridge would replace the ferry that connects the village of Chacao, Ancud Comuna, on Route 5 (Ruta 5 Sur) at the northern end of Chiloé Island across the Chacao Channel with the village of Pargua, Calbuco Comuna, on the mainland.

The original design for the bridge showed a total length of 2,635 metres (8,645 ft), consisting of three concrete towers (two 179.6 metres [589 ft] high towers and one 160.77 metres [527.5 ft] high south tower), two mainspans of 1,055 metres (3,461 ft) and 1,100 metres (3,600 ft), and a suspended side span of 380 metres (1,250 ft), providing a minimum vertical clearance for navigation of 59 metres (194 ft). It was designed with two one-way lanes on each side. The bridge was designed for a lifespan of 100 years, resistant to winds over 240 kilometres per hour (150 mph), and strong sea currents.

== Design and construction ==
The project includes the construction of a suspension bridge with long spans, which will be the largest in Latin America, a region of the world where cable-stayed bridges dominate, with the longest suspension bridges being the Angostura Bridge over the Orinoco River in Venezuela, with a total length of 1,679 metres (5,509 ft) and a main span of 712 metres (2,336 ft), followed by the Hercílio Luz Bridge, which connects Santa Catarina Island to the mainland of the city of Florianópolis in southeastern Brazil, a structure with a total length of 821 metres (2,694 ft) and a main span of 339 metres (1,112 ft).

Diagram of the bridge's dimensions, according to the Diario Concepción.

The bridge will connect the Big Island with the mainland at the narrowest point of the Chacao Channel—2.5 kilometres (1.6 mi)—between Punta San Gallán (Ancud) and Punta Coronel (Calbuco). It will have a total length of 2,750 metres (9,020 ft) and a width of 21.6 metres (71 ft), with four lanes, a central tower of 179 metres (587 ft) in height installed on the Remolino rock, and two north and south towers of 199 metres (653 ft) and 157 metres (515 ft) in height, respectively. The south tower will be the only one not in the water. Due to the strong winds in the channel, the bridge is designed to withstand gusts of up to 200 kilometres per hour (120 mph); however, in "high wind" situations, vehicle traffic will be temporarily restricted. Crossing the bridge is estimated to take three minutes at a speed of 80 kilometres per hour (50 mph). High-strength concrete and steel will be used, a type of material very common in large-scale projects worldwide, and on which several Chilean researchers have already conducted studies and experimental tests to verify the mechanical properties of these materials.

In addition to the bridge itself, the project includes an operations center located southeast of the structure, for data analysis and monitoring of the bridge's operation. This building will also include a viewing platform for visitors, a café, and a museum about the bridge and the History of Chiloé. On the north side, there will be a smaller building replicating the operations center's functions.

Although not part of the bridge construction itself, the project also includes road access to the structure. The northern access was built as part of the highway Concession Puerto Montt-Pargua, based on the original Bicentennial Bridge project, while the southern access—4.5 kilometres (2.8 mi) in length—was tendered by the MOP in 2013.

In November 2016, Bentley Systems awarded the project the international "Be Inspired" award for the best engineering design in the world.

== Financing ==
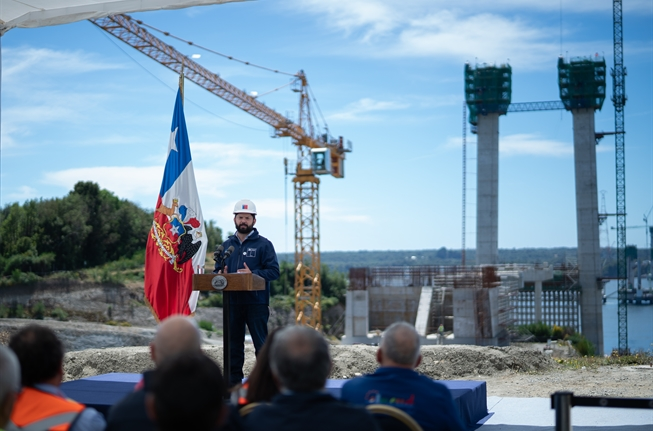
President of the Republic, Gabriel Boric Font, inspects the Chacao Bridge construction site, January 2024.

Financing, design, construction, operation and maintenance was originally awarded for thirty years to the Chiloé Bicentennial Bridge Consortium, consisting of French company Vinci Construction Grand Projets, German company Hochtief, American Bridge Company and Chilean companies Besalco and Tecsa. Hochtief was the overall leader, Vinci provided the technical lead, and American Bridge was to contribute cable spinning and deck erection technology.

In the revived 2012 process the contract was awarded to a consortium of the OAS, Hyundai, SYSTRA, and Aas-Jakobsen with financial backing from Brazilian, French and Norwegian investors.

== Criticism ==
Supporters expected that the bridge would boost tourism, increase investment and business opportunities on the island and provide better access to medical care. However, some inhabitants of Chiloé did not agree and they claimed that the bridge was harmful and even dangerous. This was due to claims that it would increase resource collection such as logging and increase pollution.

== See also ==
- List of bridges in Chile
- List of longest cable-stayed bridge spans
