= Torres del Paine (commune) =

- Commune
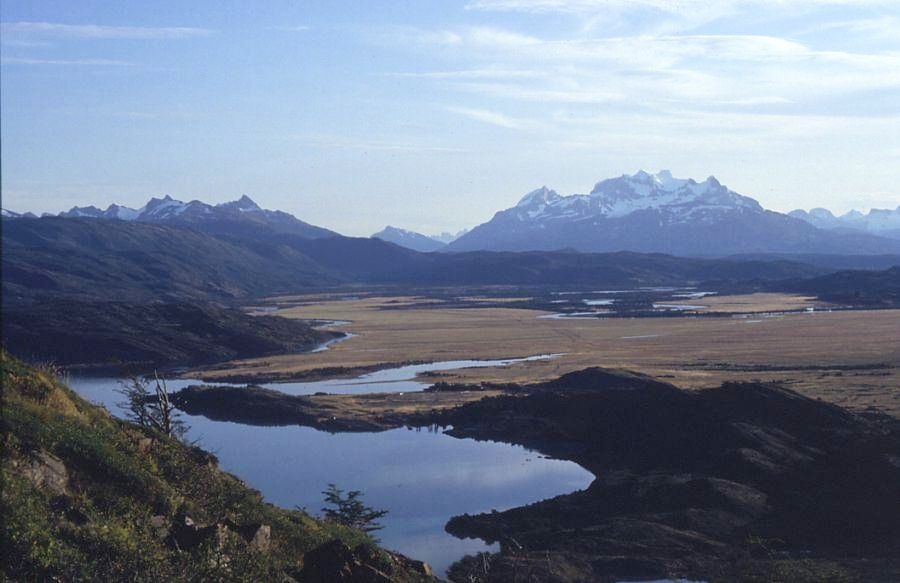

- Location of the Torres del Paine commune in the Magallanes Region Location in Chile
- Coordinates (seat): 51°15′33″S 72°20′42″W
- Country: Chile
- Region: Magallanes y Antártica Chilena
- Province: Última Esperanza
- Seat: Cerro Castillo

Government
  - Type: Municipality
  - Alcalde: Anahi Cardenas Rodríguez (Ind.)

Area
  - Total: 6,469.7 km^{2} (2,498.0 sq mi)
- Elevation: 113 m (371 ft)

Population (2012 Census)
  - Total: 180
  - Density: 0.028/km^{2} (0.072/sq mi)
  - Urban: 0
  - Rural: 739

Sex
  - Men: 543
  - Women: 196
- Time zone: UTC-4 (CLT)
  - Summer (DST): UTC-3 (CLST)
- Area code: 56 + 61
- Website: Municipality of Torres del Paine

Torres del Paine is a Chilean commune located in the inland of Última Esperanza Province and Magallanes Region. The commune is administered by the municipality in Cerro Castillo, the major settlement in the commune. Torres del Paine National Park lies within the commune. Paine means "blue" in the native Tehuelche (Aonikenk) language and is pronounced PIE-nay.

== Demographics ==
Historical population
Year	Pop.	±% p.a.
1930	652	—
1940	669	+0.26%
1952	667	−0.02%
1970	533	−1.24%
1982	451	−1.38%
1992	482	+0.67%
2002	739	+4.37%
2017	1,209	+3.34%
2024	203	−22.50%
Source: "Censo de Población y Vivienda". National Statistics Institute.

According to the 2002 census of the National Statistics Institute, Torres del Paine spans an area of 6,469.7 km^{2} (2,498 sq mi) and has 739 inhabitants (543 men and 196 women), making the commune an entirely rural area. The population grew by 53.3% (257 persons) between the 1992 and 2002 censuses.

== Administration ==
As a commune, Torres del Paine is a third-level administrative division of Chile administered by a municipal council, headed by an alcalde who is directly elected every four years. The 2012-2016 alcalde is Anahi Cardenas Rodríguez (Ind.).

Within the electoral divisions of Chile, Torres del Paine is represented in the Chamber of Deputies by Juan Morano (PDC) and Gabriel Boric (Ind.) as part of the 60th electoral district, which includes the entire Magallanes y la Antártica Chilena Region. The commune is represented in the Senate by Carlos Bianchi Chelech (Ind.) and Carolina Goic (PDC) as part of the 19th senatorial constituency (Magallanes y la Antártica Chilena Region).

== Gallery ==
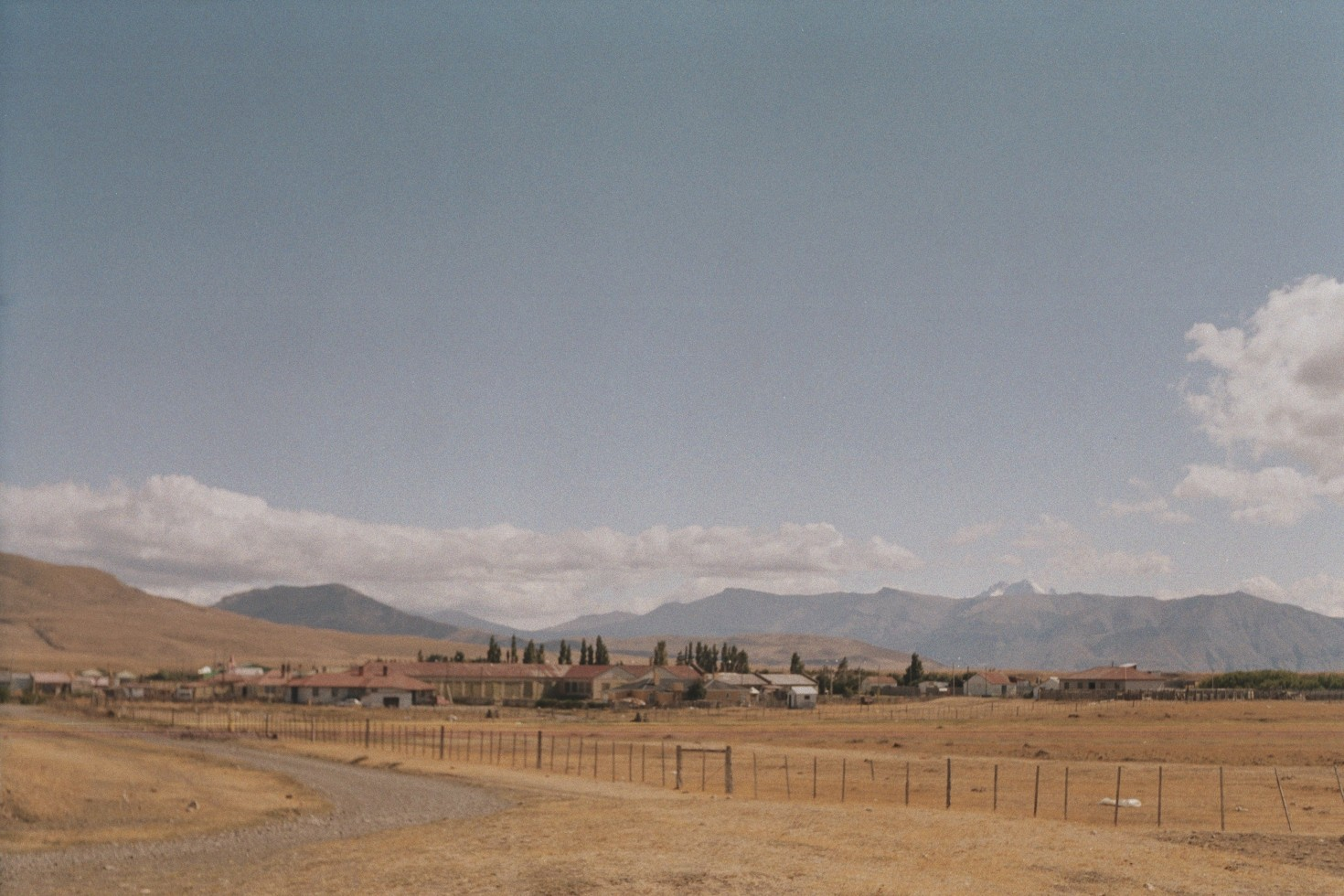
Field

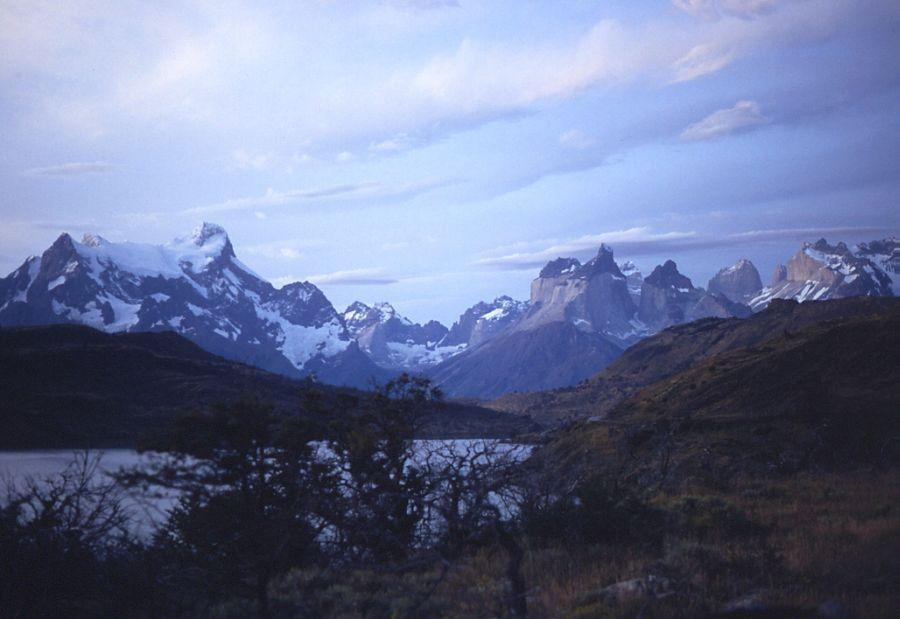
Torres del Paine

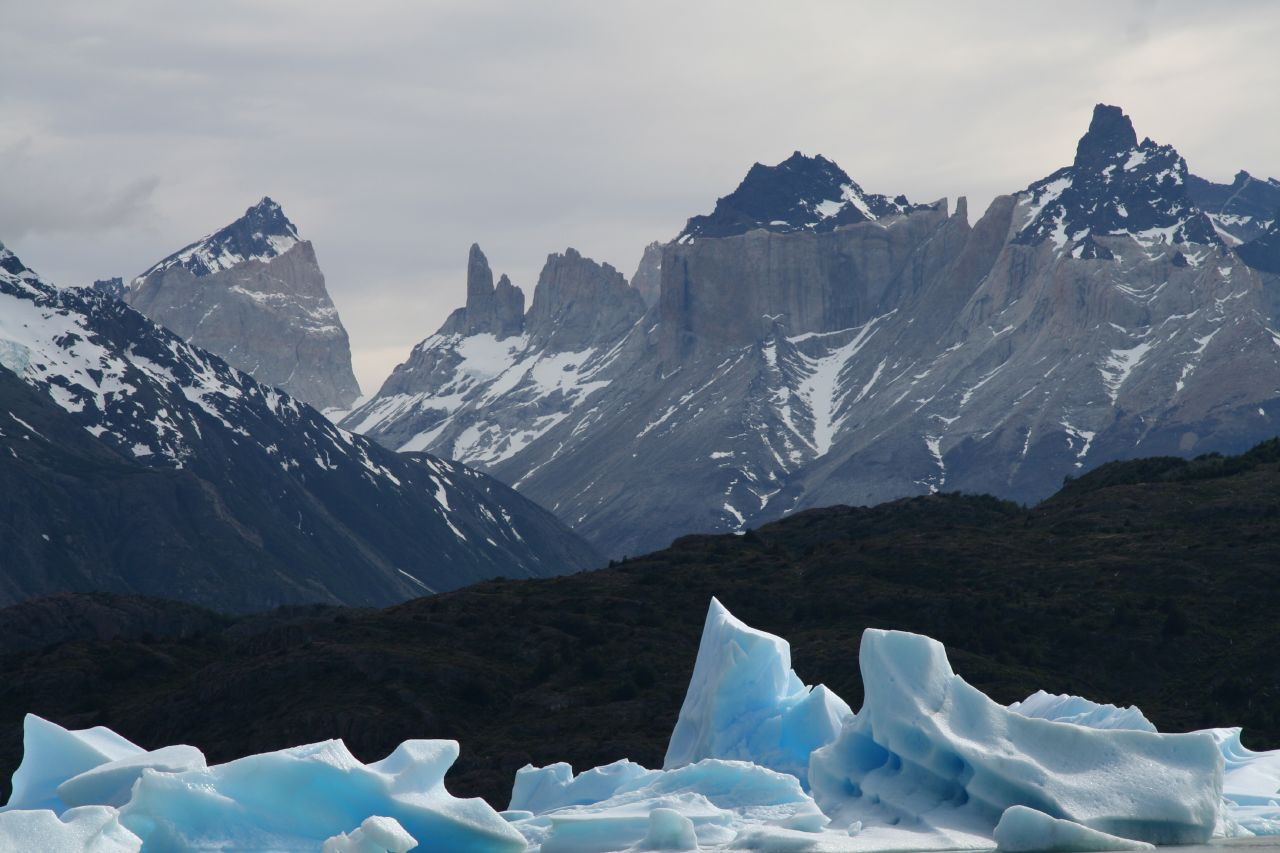
Lake Grey

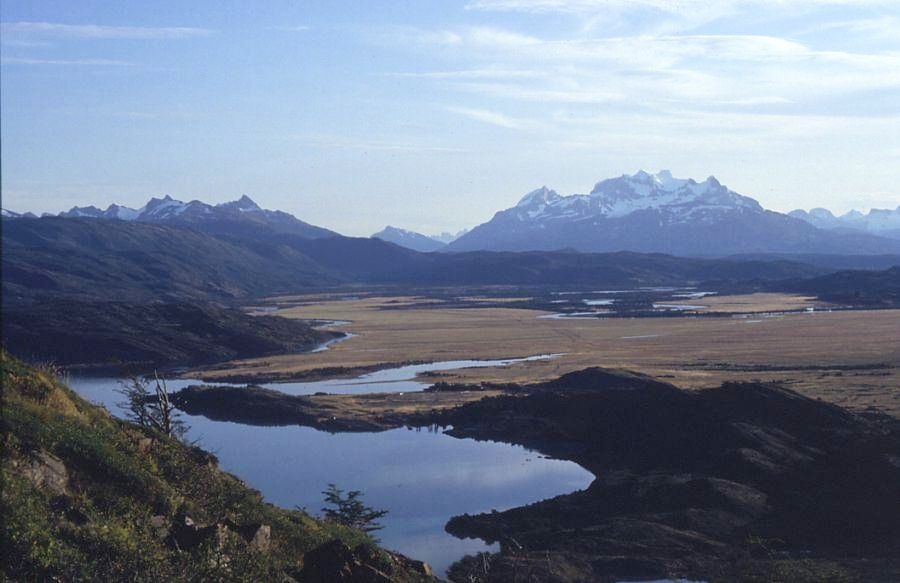
Lake Toro

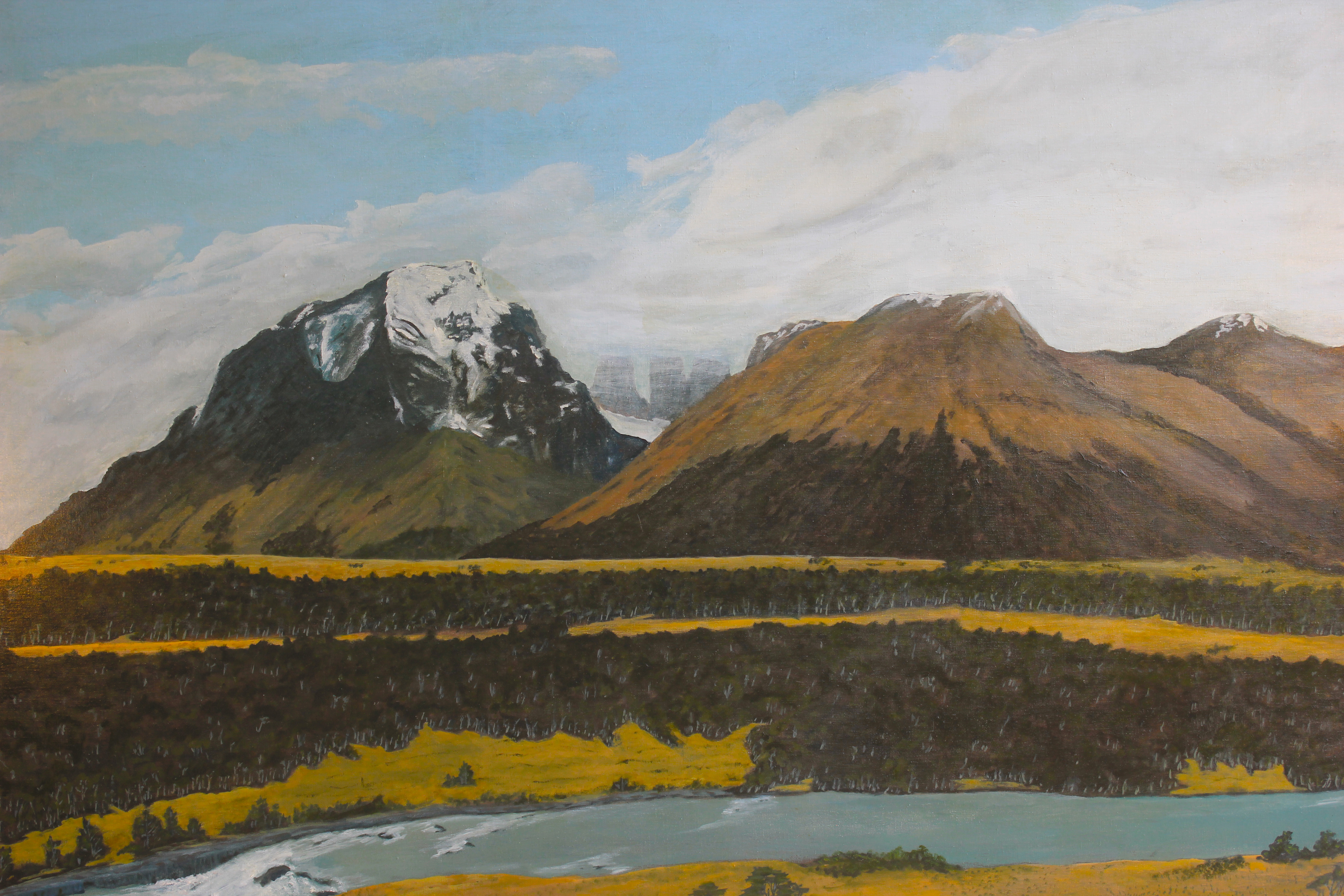
Almirante Nieto Massif
Oil on canvas
Eugenio Cruz Vargas
