= Chile Route 5 =

Highway in Chile

Route 5
- Ruta 5

Location
- Country: Chile

Highway system
- Highways in Chile

Chile Highway 5 or Route 5 known locally as Ruta 5 is Chile's longest route, 3,364 kilometres (2,090 mi). It is part of the Pan-American Highway.

== Stretch ==
It runs from the Peruvian border connecting with Peru Highway 1 19 kilometres (12 mi) north of Arica to Puerto Montt where it connects by ferry to the island of Chiloé. It passes through Santiago, the country's capital, where it is called Autopista Central.

== Highway grade ==
From the north border with Peru to north of Caldera, Ruta 5 is a two lane paved road with a speed limit of 100 kilometres per hour (62 mph). From Caldera to Pargua, the road was upgraded to a 4-lane freeway with 120 kilometres per hour (75 mph) as speed limit, 20% faster than Chile's common 100 kilometres per hour (62 mph) maximum speed limit. The freeway ends in Pargua, but it divides into two routes, one crossing the Chacao Channel that separates Chiloé from the continent, reaching its end in Quellón, and another route named Carretera Austral (Spanish for Southern Highway) that was opened in the 1980s. The southern part of Ruta 5 crosses long extensions of native woods and important cities.

== Freeway grade ==
South of Caldera to Pargua (1,956 kilometres or 1,215 miles) it is a 4-lane divided highway and toll road for the most part. It is Chile's longest freeway. The speed limit on the freeway is 120 kilometres per hour (75 mph) and as of May 2007 drivers must travel with their lights on at all times.

== Tunnels ==
Four tunnels are part of Route 5, namely El Melón I, El Melón II, La Calavera I, La Calavera II and Angostura, which have lengths of 2,543 m (8,343 ft), 298 m (978 ft), 298 m (978 ft), 341 m (1,119 ft) respectively. Each one of them carries two lanes of traffic, with the El Melón Tunnels being recently upgraded as of June 22, 2022.
