= Chacao Channel =

Natural waterway between Chiloé Island and mainland Chile

Coordinates: 41°49′30″S 73°29′30″W

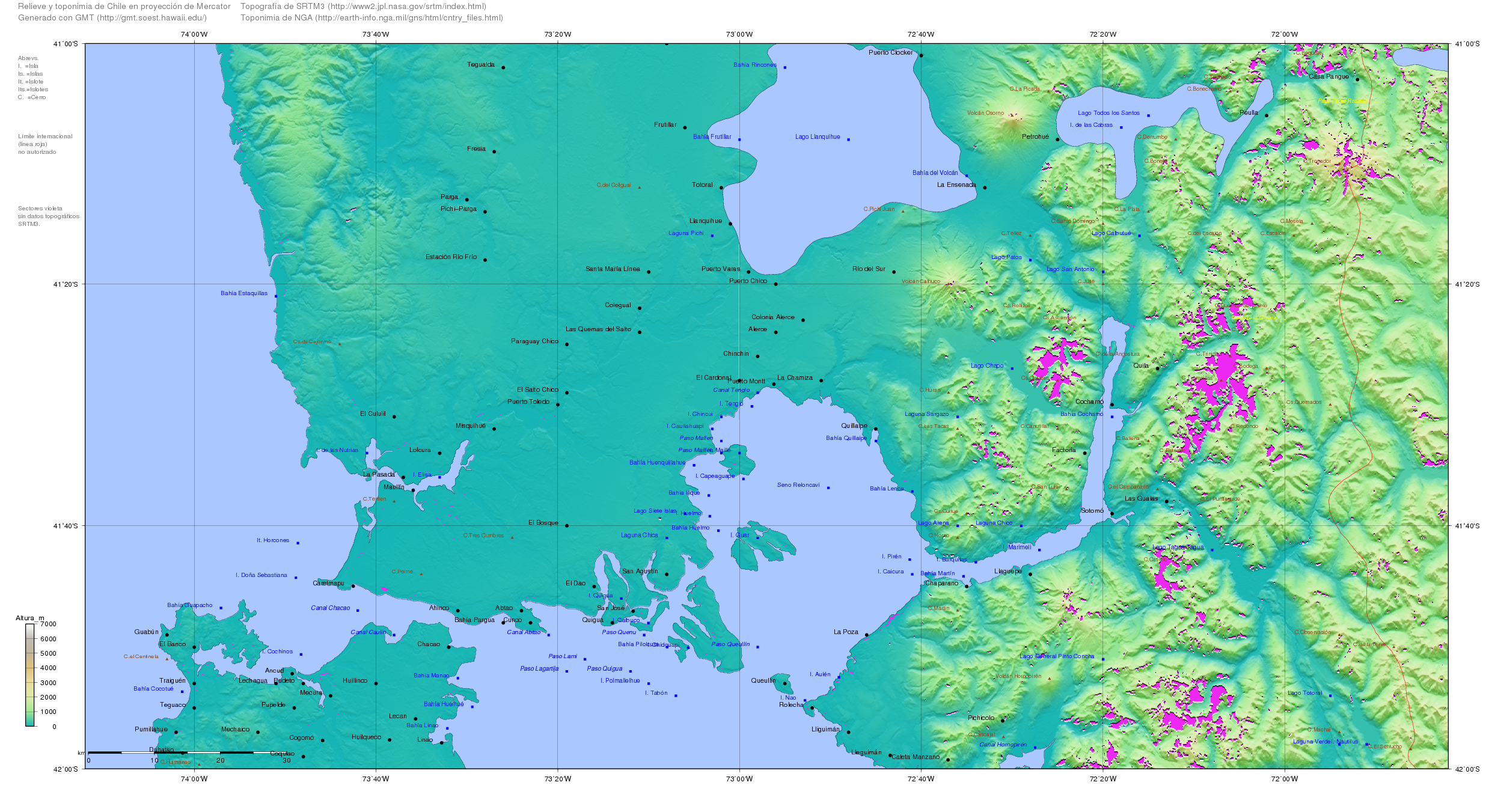
Location of Chacao Channel in Los Lagos Region.

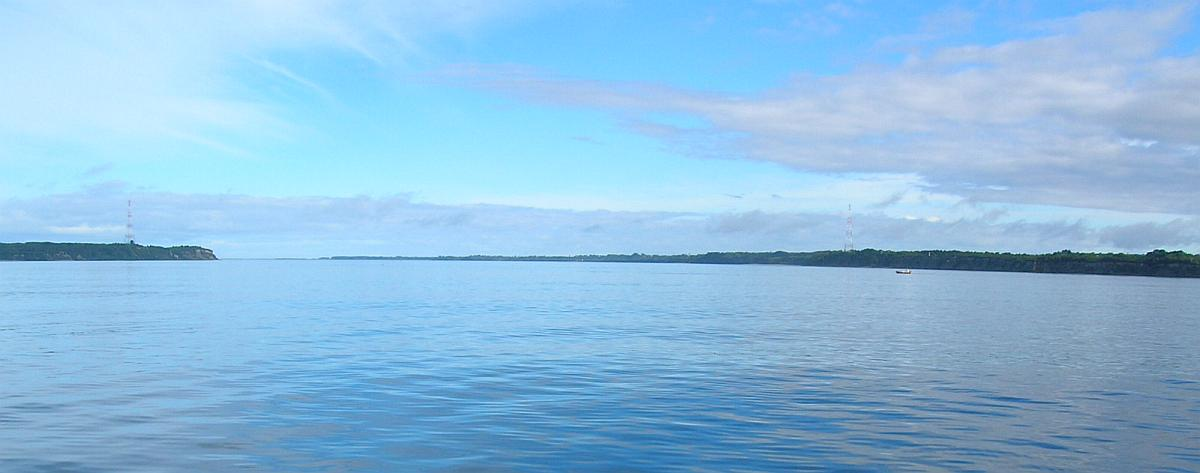
Chacao Channel with Chiloé to the left, and the mainland to the right

The Chacao Channel (Spanish: Canal de Chacao) is located in Los Lagos Region, Chile and separates Chiloé Island from mainland Chile. The channel is about 40 kilometres (25 mi) long and 4 kilometres (2.5 mi) wide and connects the Pacific Ocean and Gulf of Ancud. The channel was created during the Quaternary glaciations by successive glaciers that flowed down from the Andes to the coast. The construction of a bridge connecting the island with the continent was discussed at government level for some time, but during the first government of Michelle Bachelet (2006–2010) it was turned down due to its high cost in comparison with other proposals that could be done to benefit islanders. Later, it was reactivated during Sebastián Piñera government, and finally auctioned. Construction started in 2017 and expected to be completed in 2028.

A single-circuit 220 kV-powerline with a span-length of 2,682 metres (8,799 ft) crosses the Chacao Channel, built in 1995. The towers of each end of this span are 179 metres (587 ft) tall.

The horizontal speed of tides in the channel has been measured to reach a maximum between 4 and 5 metres per second (13 and 16 ft/s) during flood and 3 to 4 metres per second (9.8 to 13.1 ft/s) during ebb. The channel has a high tidal energy potential.

About 700 metres (2,300 ft) from the southern bank of the channel is a rocky promontory known as Roca Remolinos in the channel. Its top can occasionally be seen during very low tides. About 1,500 metres (4,900 ft) southeast of Roca Remolinos is a 20 metres (66 ft) deep bank known as Seluian Bank.

== See also ==
- Fjords and channels of Chile
