= Felipe Westhoff =

Felipe Arnold Westhoff Rodhius was a 19th-century entrepreneur known for his role in the logging of Pilgerodendron uviferum and the founding of Melinka in Guaitecas Archipelago in 1860. Westhoff was an ethnic German who migrated to South America from Lithuania, which was then part of the Russian Empire.

The first part of the Ferrocarril Central Andino that was built in Peru was the railway between Callao and Lima. To build this railway Westhoff was sent to purchase railway sleepers. Westhoff arrived this way to Ancud from where he administered a Pilgerodendron uviferum (Spanish: ciprés de las Guaitecas) logging industry in Guaitecas Archipelago in Patagonia. For the purpose of overseeing the business he founded the settlement of Melinka in 1860, the first permanent settlement in Guaitecas Archipelago. Westhoff had exclusive logging rights in Guaitecas and was granted the position of subdelegado marítimo by Chilean authorities. While he held this position of authority until the early 1870s, in reality it implied few benefits.

While not longer an agent of Ferrocarril Central Andino he continued to export sleepers to Peru. Westhoff was active in the logging industry in the 1860s and early 1870s becoming a wealthy man. When retiring from the wood industry he settled in Valdivia working as a teacher. After the retirement of Westhoff, Ciriaco Álvarez, a native from Chonchi, rose as the most prominent Pilgerodendron uviferum businessman in the area.

Citing alleged analogies with the Urals, New Zealand and Colombia Westhoff believed the Chonos-Guaitecas archipelago to have great mineral wealth to be discovered. Westhoff was critical of the intentional forest fires and allegedly ineffective sea lion hunting techniques used by Chilotes travelling south to the archipelagoes of Guaitecas and Chonos.
