= Nihualac Channel =

Body of water in South America

- Location within Chile

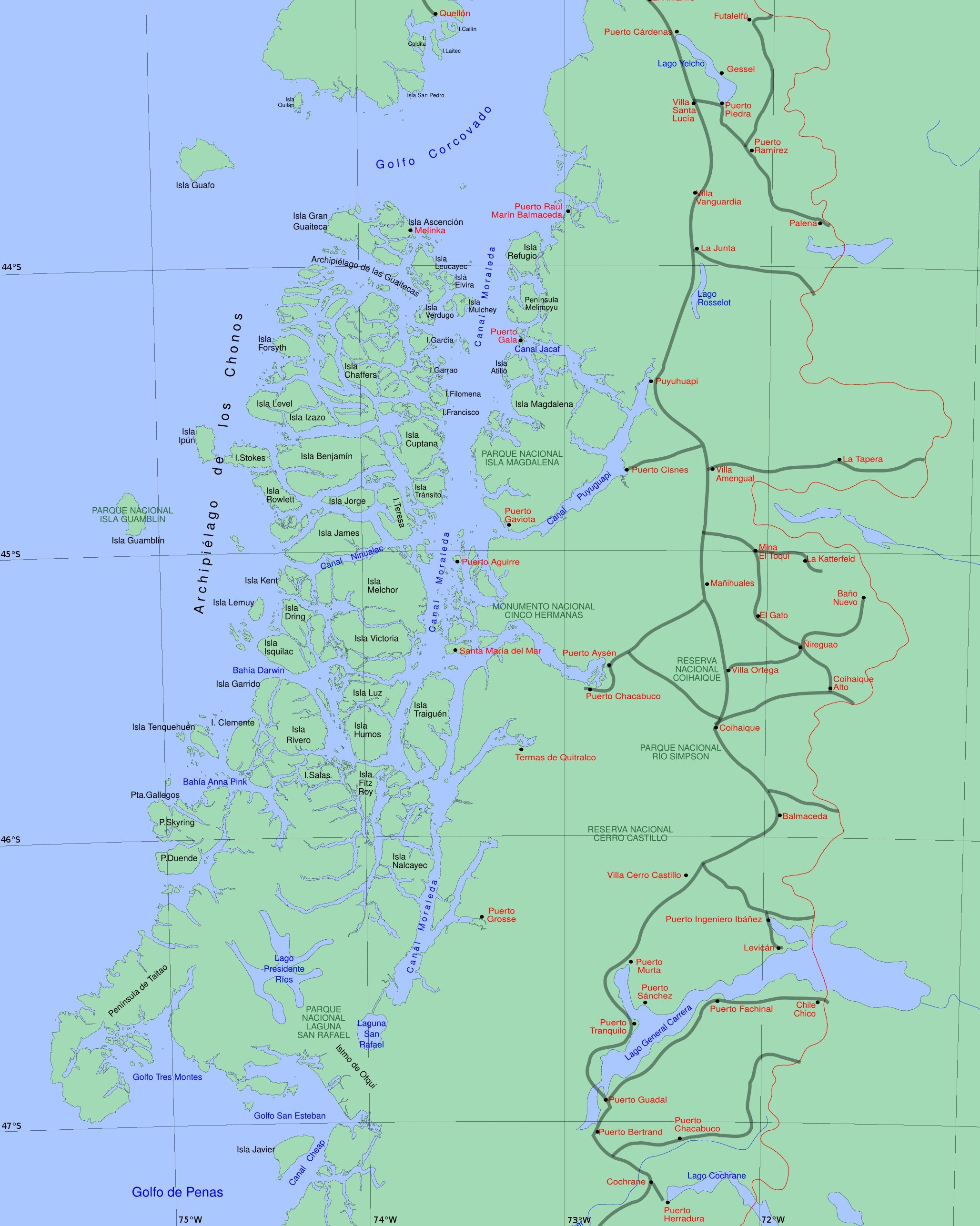
- Location: Southern America
- Coordinates: 45°1′27.36″S 74°3′11.68″W
- Basin countries: Chile

Nihualac Channel (Spanish: Canal Nihualac) is a body of water in the Chonos Archipelago separating James and Teresa islands in the north from Melchor and Kent islands in the south. The channel has a SWW-NEE orientation. On its western end, it reaches the open Pacific Ocean while on its eastern end it connects with the north–south Moraleda Channel.
