= Repollal =

- Location within Chile
- Coordinates: 43.860924°S 73.888644°W
- Region: Aysén
- Province: Aysén
- Municipality: Guaitecas
- Commune: Guaitecas

Government
  - Type: Municipal

Population (2002)
  - Total: 124
- 81 (Repollal Alto), 7 (Repollal Medio) and 36 (Repollal Bajo)
- Time zone: UTC−04:00 (Chilean Standard)
  - Summer (DST): UTC−03:00 (Chilean Daylight)
- Area code: Country + town = 56 + 67

Repollal (lit. place of cabbages) is a group of hamlets in Ascención Island of Guaitecas Archipelago, southern Chile. Repollal consists from north to south of three hamlets; Repollal Alto, Repollal Medio and Repollal Bajo. All the hamlets lie to the west of Melinka which is the only town in the archipelago. In 2002 the population of Repollal Alto was 81, in Repollal Medio it was 7 and in Repollal Bajo 36. Repollal is connected to Melinka by a gravel road. The population of Repollal is made up descendants of settlers from Chiloé Archipelago.
