= Traiguén Island =

Island in the Chonos Archipelago of Chile

Traigén
Native name: Isla Traiguén
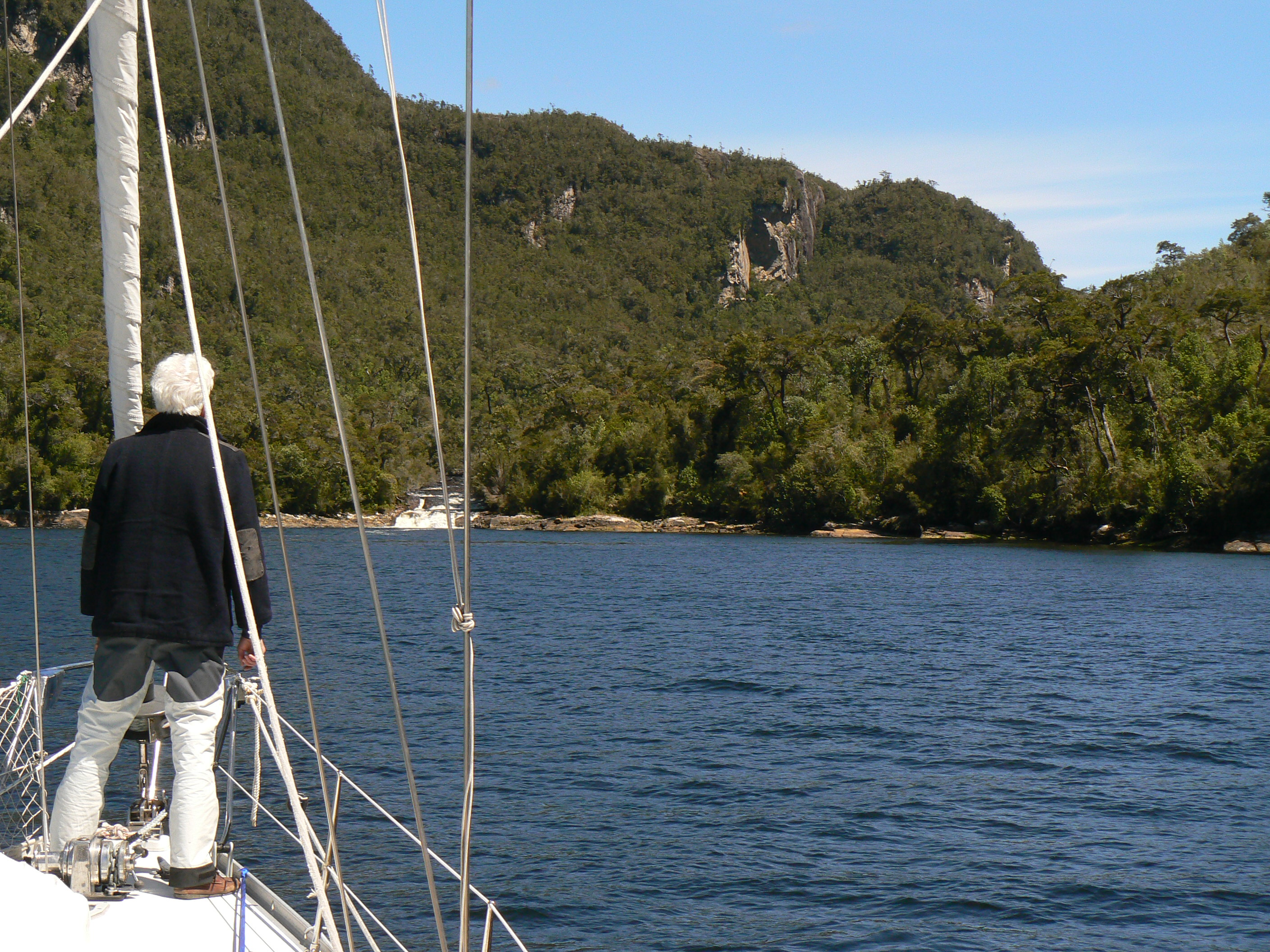
- View of the northeastern shore of Traiguén Island

- Location within Chile

Geography
- Coordinates: 45°34′15″S 73°40′14″W
- Archipelago: Chonos Archipelago
- Adjacent to: Pacific Ocean
- Area: 520.2 km^{2} (200.9 sq mi)
- Coastline: 185.0 km (114.95 mi)
- Highest elevation: 701 m (2300 ft)

Administration
- Chile
- Region: Aisén
- Province: Aysén Province
- Commune: Aysén

Additional information
- NGA UFI=-903232

Traiguén Island is an island in the Chonos Archipelago of Chile. The geological formation of Traiguén is named after the island.

Various archaeological remnants have been found in the island, including fish traps of stone and arrowheads. There are shell middens in the islands whose basal part has been dated to 1,300 years BP.

In August 2023, 264 hectares (650 acres) of the shores and coastal waters of the island were transferred to the indigenous community Nahuelquín Delgado to exercise a stewardship over the area. By that point, the community which consists of eight families, had been claiming rights to the area for about 20 years.

The majority of the island was purchased from the Chilean military in 2008 by entrepreneur Eduardo Ergas. He is the owner of helicopter charter operator EcoCopter. His hope was to save a rare species of frog described by Charles Darwin. In 2023 he announced his intention to sell to private conservationists.

== See also ==
- List of islands of Chile
