= Rivero Island =

Island in Chile

Native name: Isla Rivero
- Location within Chile

Geography
- Coordinates: 45.62°S 74.34°W
- Archipelago: Chonos Archipelago
- Adjacent to: Pacific Ocean
- Area: 451.5 km^{2} (174.3 sq mi)
- Coastline: 123.7 km (76.86 mi)

Administration
- Chile
- Region: Aisén
- Province: Aysén Province
- Commune: Guaitecas

Additional information
- NGA UFI=-899462

Rivero Island (Spanish Isla Rivero) is an island in the Chonos Archipelago of Chile.

== See also ==
- List of islands of Chile
