= Chonchi =

- Town and Commune
- Location of Chonchi commune in Los Lagos Region Location in Chile
- Coordinates: 42°37′19″S 73°46′27″W
- Country: Chile
- Region: Los Lagos
- Province: Chiloé
- Founded: 1767

Government
  - Type: Municipality
  - Alcalde: Fernando Oyarzún Macías (RN)

Area
  - Total: 1,362.1 km^{2} (525.9 sq mi)
- Elevation: 26 m (85 ft)

Population (2012 Census)
  - Total: 12,959
  - Density: 9.5140/km^{2} (24.641/sq mi)
  - Urban: 4,588
  - Rural: 7,984

Sex
  - Men: 6,453
  - Women: 6,119
- Area code: 56 + 65
- Website: Municipality of Chonchi

Chonchi is a Chilean town and commune located in Los Lagos Region. The commune consists of the town of Chonchi and the following villages:

- Rauco
- Quinched
- Vilupulli
- Teupa
- Terao
- Petanes
- Notue
- Quiao
- Huillinco
- Cucao

== Demographics ==
Historical population
Year	Pop.	±% p.a.
1875	8,563	—
1885	9,853	+1.41%
1895	10,051	+0.20%
1907	10,971	+0.73%
1920	13,335	+1.51%
1930	9,505	−3.33%
1940	10,596	+1.09%
1952	9,937	−0.53%
1970	9,524	−0.24%
1982	9,594	+0.06%
1992	10,627	+1.03%
2002	12,572	+1.69%
2017	14,858	+1.12%
2024	16,078	+1.13%
Source: "Censo de Población y Vivienda". National Statistics Institute.

According to the 2002 census of the National Statistics Institute, Chonchi spans an area of 1,362.1 km^{2} (526 sq mi) and has 12,572 inhabitants (6,453 men and 6,119 women). Of these, 4,588 (36.5%) lived in urban areas and 7,984 (63.5%) in rural areas. The population grew by 18.3% (1,945 persons) between the 1992 and 2002 censuses.

== History ==
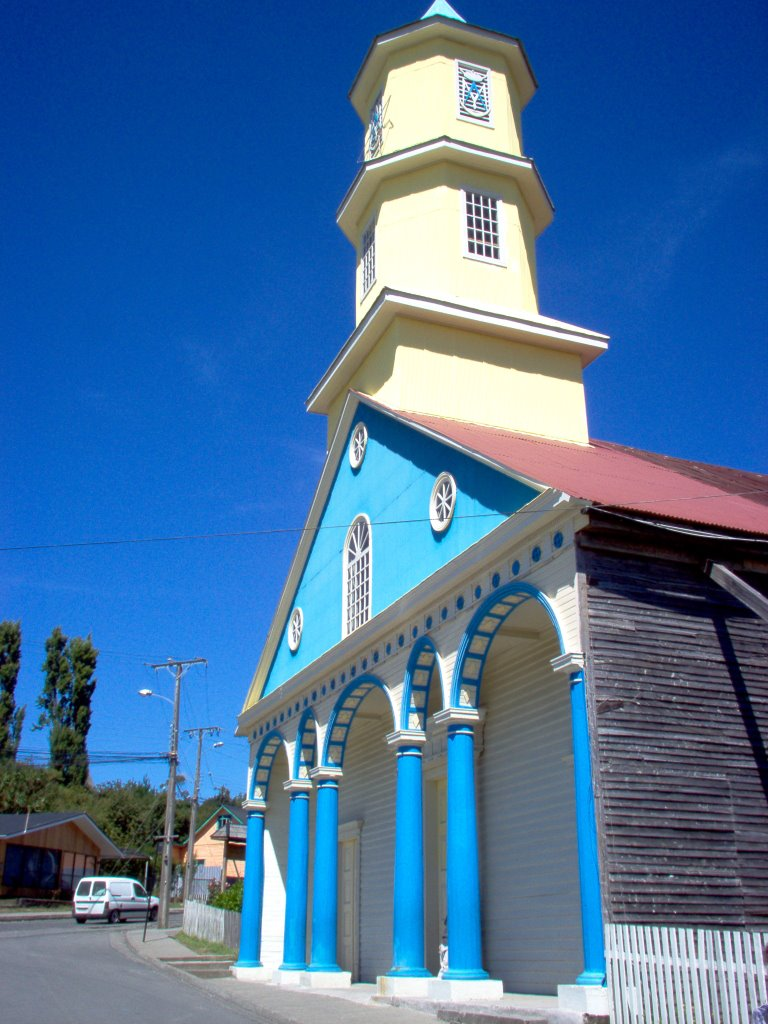
Iglesia San Carlos de Chonchi

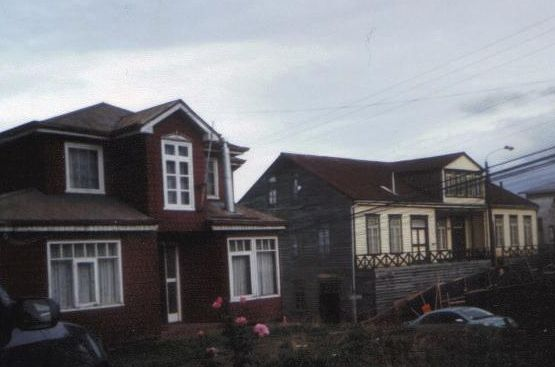
Traditional architecture in Chonchi

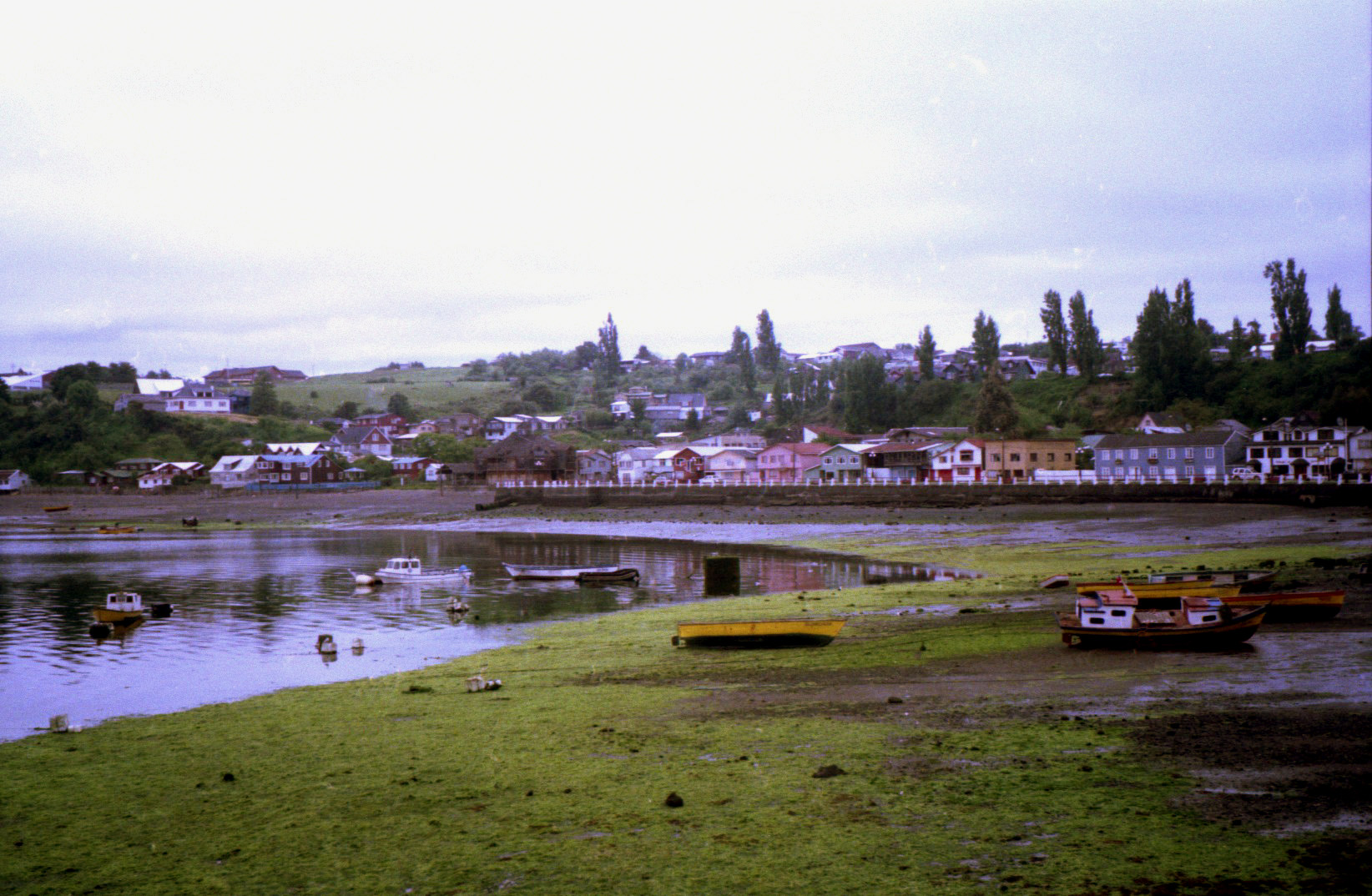
General view of Chonchi

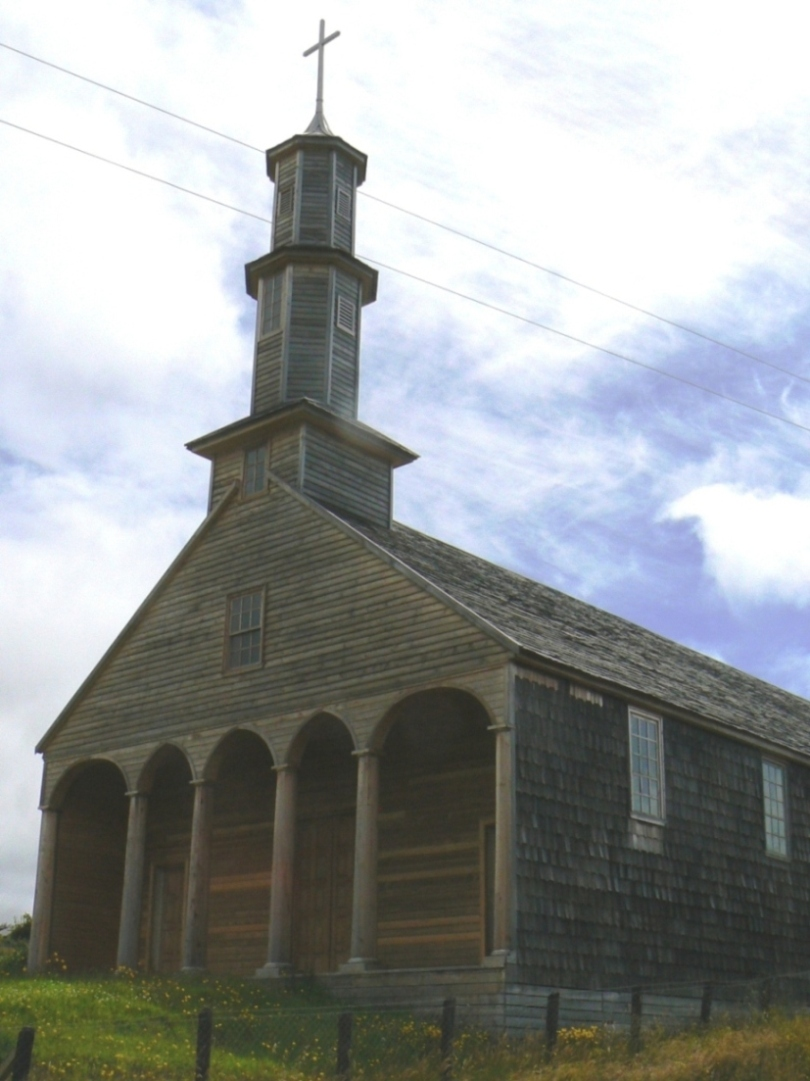
Church in Vilupulli

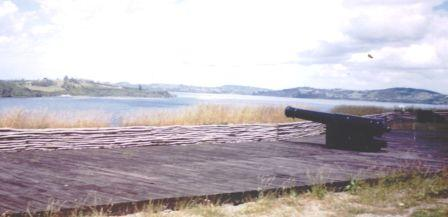
Fuerte Tauco, a fortress dating from 1780

Originally Chonchi was a Jesuit mission station with a school which had 150 pupils in 1755, and the town itself was founded in 1767 by order of Don Guil y Gonzaga, the Governor of Chiloé. In 1787 Chonchi had 315 inhabitants. Unification with Chile increased the economic importance of the region and promoted population growth. The 1833 census in Chonchi demonstrated that it was the most important town in south of the island. It became a parish in 1836, resuming its traditional religious significance within the area. A good anchorage made Chonchi a natural stopping place for traffic in the canals and timber exploitation transformed it into a hub for development of the region. The economic activity centred upon Chonchi reached its zenith at the beginning of the 20th century creating an opulent society with an active social circle. The influence of external ideas (Europeans) is clearly apparent in the town.

The pirate Pedro Ñancúpel was a native of Chonchi, being born in Terao 1837.

== Architecture and Sights ==
The nickname of Chonchi is Ciudad de los Tres Pisos which means "Town of three floors". The ground floor corresponds to the harbour and the marine drive with the picturesque market Feria Artesanal, the second floor consists of the urban architecture around the museum, and the third floor is the main square with the church.

- There are many interesting wooden houses dating from the end of the 19th and the beginning of the 20th century in Chonchi. At that time Chonchi was a booming town as the timber industry was flourishing.
- San Carlos de Borromeo Church is one of 16 wooden churches of Chiloé which were declared World Heritage by the Unesco in November 2000. Construction of the church was started in 1754 and not finished before 1859. The tower collapsed during a storm in 2002 and was rebuilt in 2004-2005.
- The other church in the commune of Chonchi which was declared World Heritage is San Antonio de Padua in the village Vilupulli in the north of Chonchi. The church was consecrated on 16 January 1872 and declared a National Monument in 1971.
- The regional museum Museo de las Tradiciones Chonchinas is in an impressive wooden building in Centenario Street. The ground floor is dedicated to the life of a wealthy family living at the beginning of the 20th century. The second and the third floors show daily life in Chonchi in the 20th century.
- On the cemetery in the west of Chonchi several interesting old tombs representing small churches can be seen.
- Fuerte Tauco is a fortress built in 1780 on the bay Fiordo de Castro. It was meant to protect the access to Castro but it was never used.

== Nearby Attractions ==
Nearby attractions include Chiloé National Park and several lakes: Huillinco, Tarahuín, Natri and Tepuhueico.

Huillinco, on Lago Huillinco, is a village of 943 inhabitants (2002), most of whom are Huilliche with an interesting cemetery.

Cucao is one of the very few settlements on Chiloé on the west coast. It is a village with 424 inhabitants (2000) at the entrance of Chiloé National Park.

== Administration ==
As a commune, Chonchi is a third-level administrative division of Chile administered by a municipal council, headed by an alcalde who is directly elected every four years. The 2008-2012 alcalde is Pedro Andrade Oyarzún (PDC).

Within the electoral divisions of Chile, Chonchi is represented in the Chamber of Deputies by Gabriel Ascencio (PDC) and Alejandro Santana (RN) as part of the 58th electoral district, together with Castro, Ancud, Quemchi, Dalcahue, Curaco de Vélez, Quinchao, Puqueldón, Queilén, Quellón, Chaitén, Hualaihué, Futaleufú and Palena. The commune is represented in the Senate by Camilo Escalona Medina (PS) and Carlos Kuschel Silva (RN) as part of the 17th senatorial constituency (Los Lagos Region).

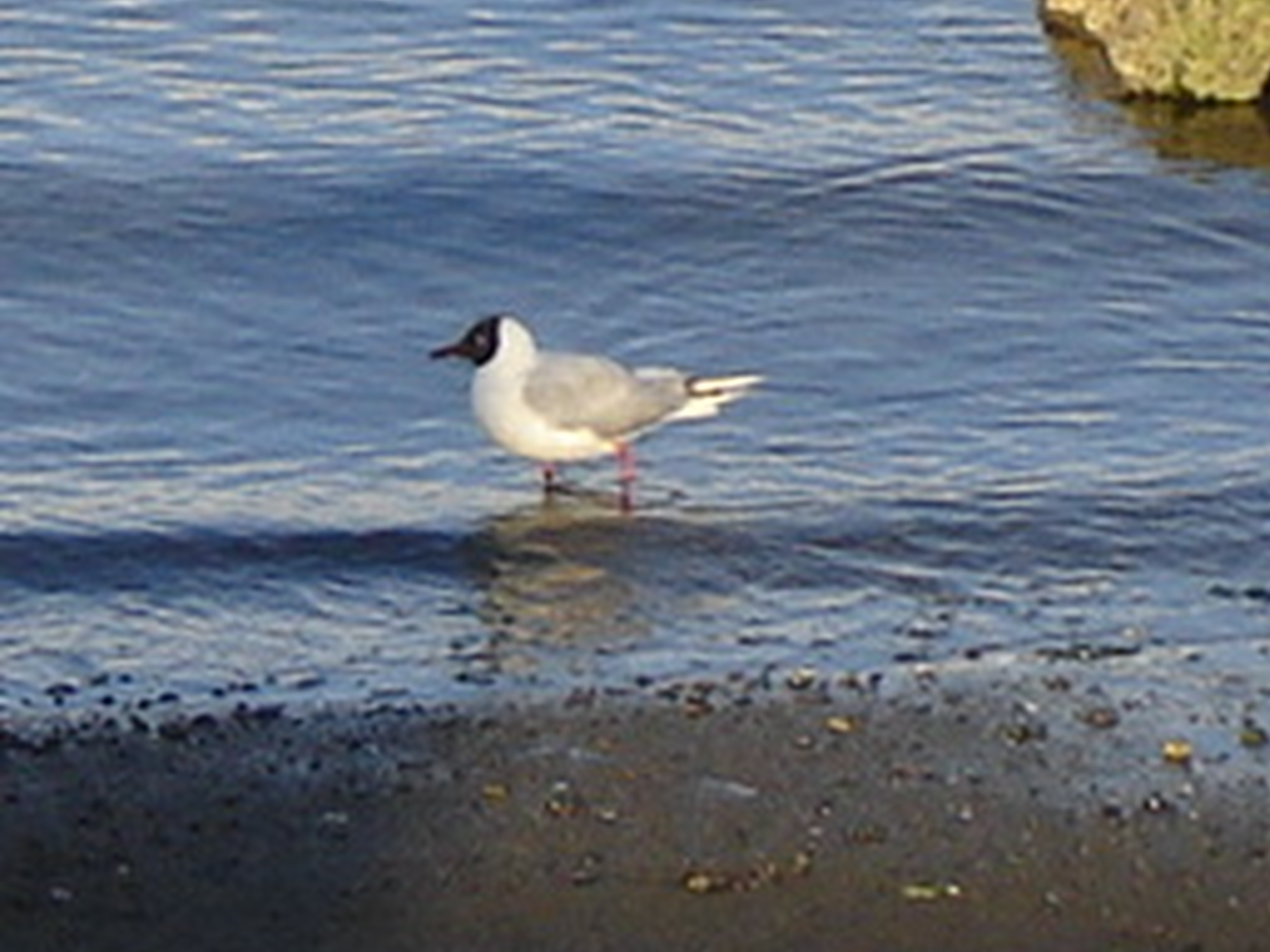
Gaviota de Franklin Chonchi coast

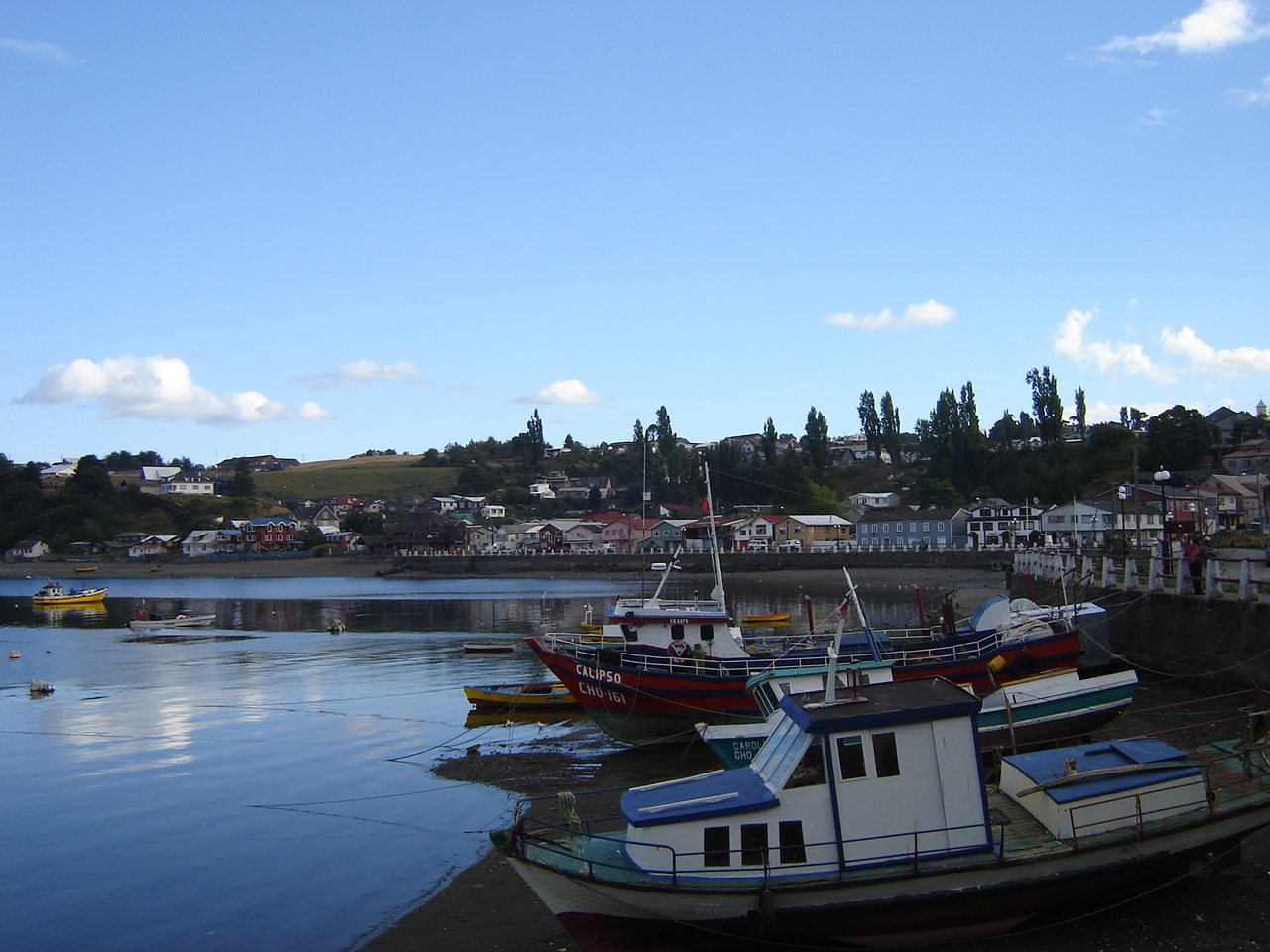
Costanera de Chonchi desde el muelle

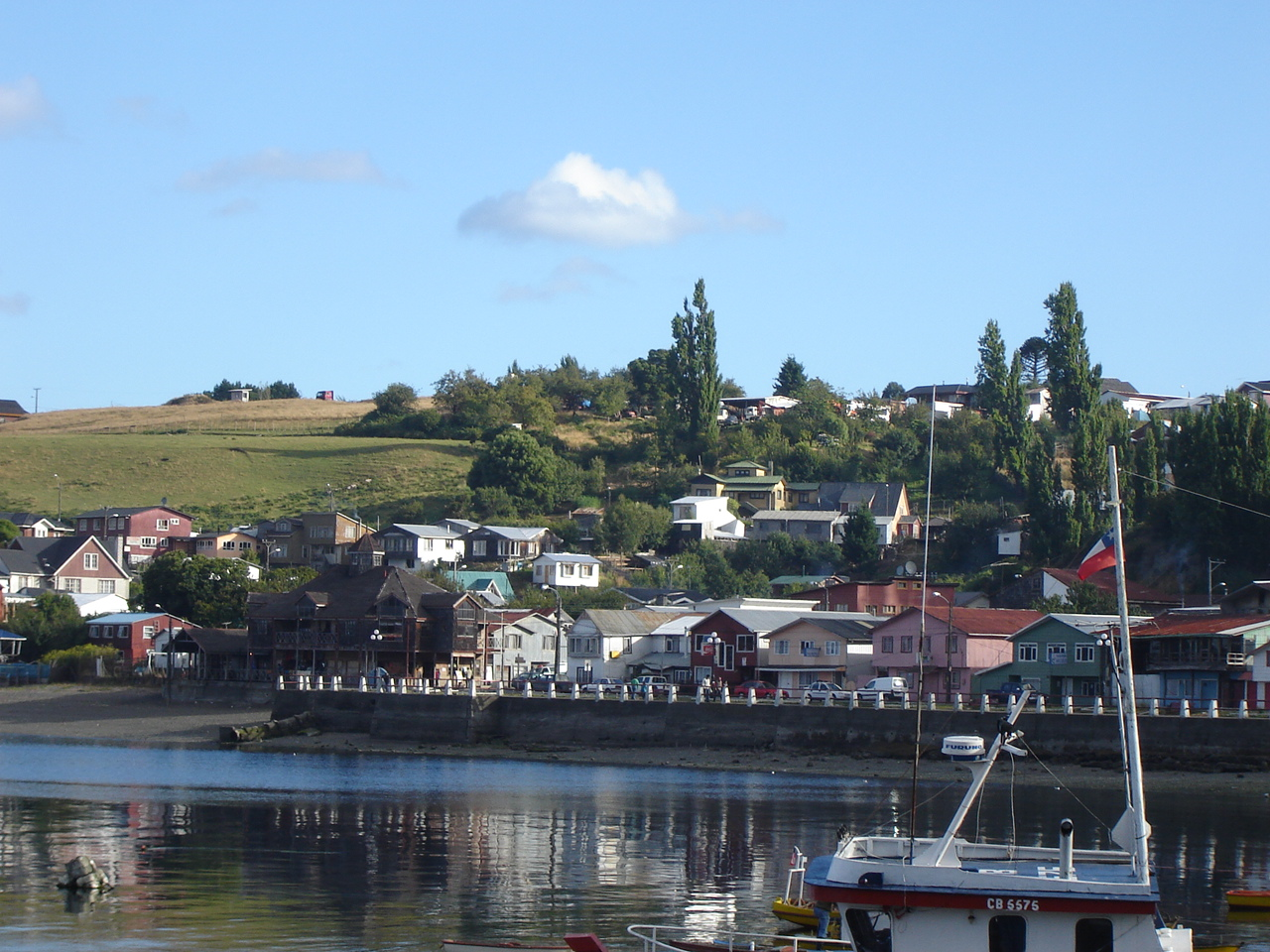
Chonchi

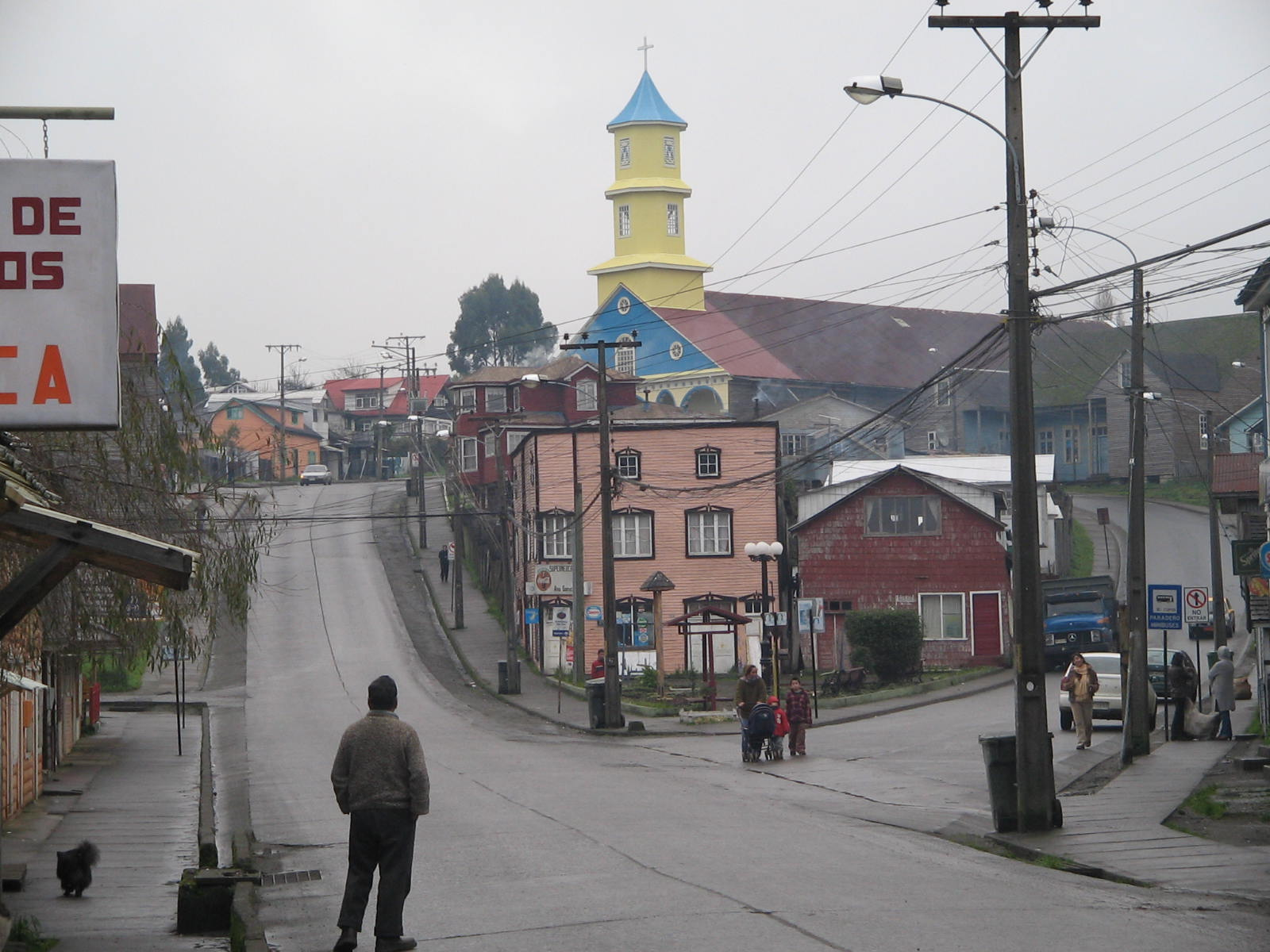
Downtown Chonchi

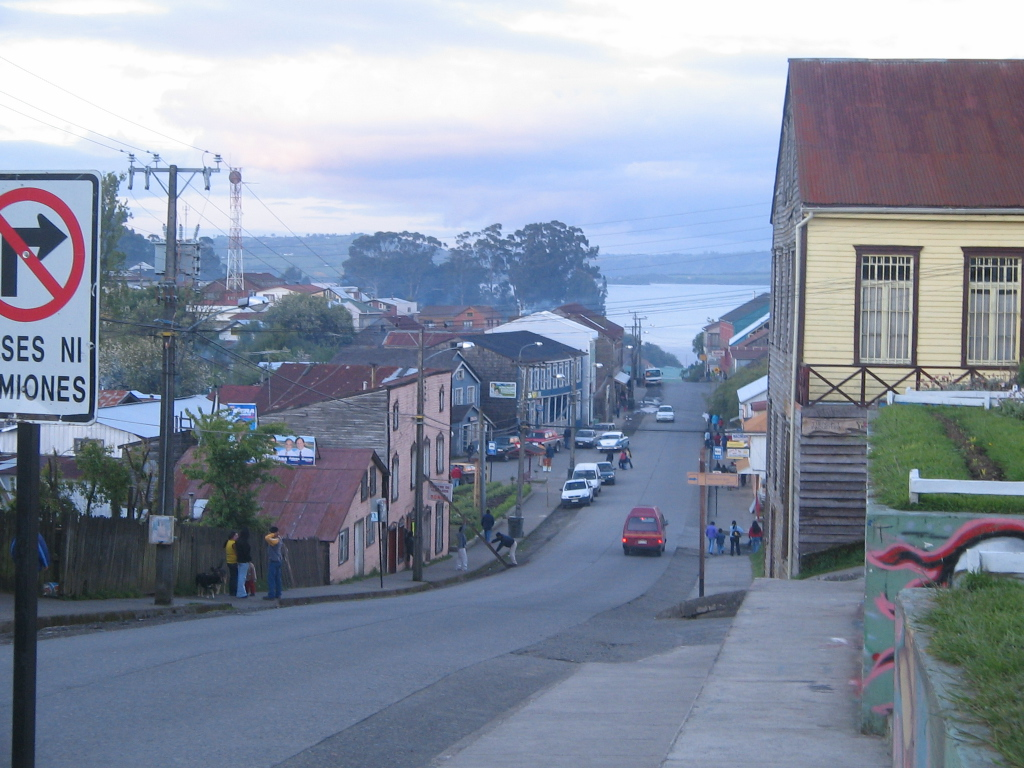
Calle centenario desde la Antigua plaza

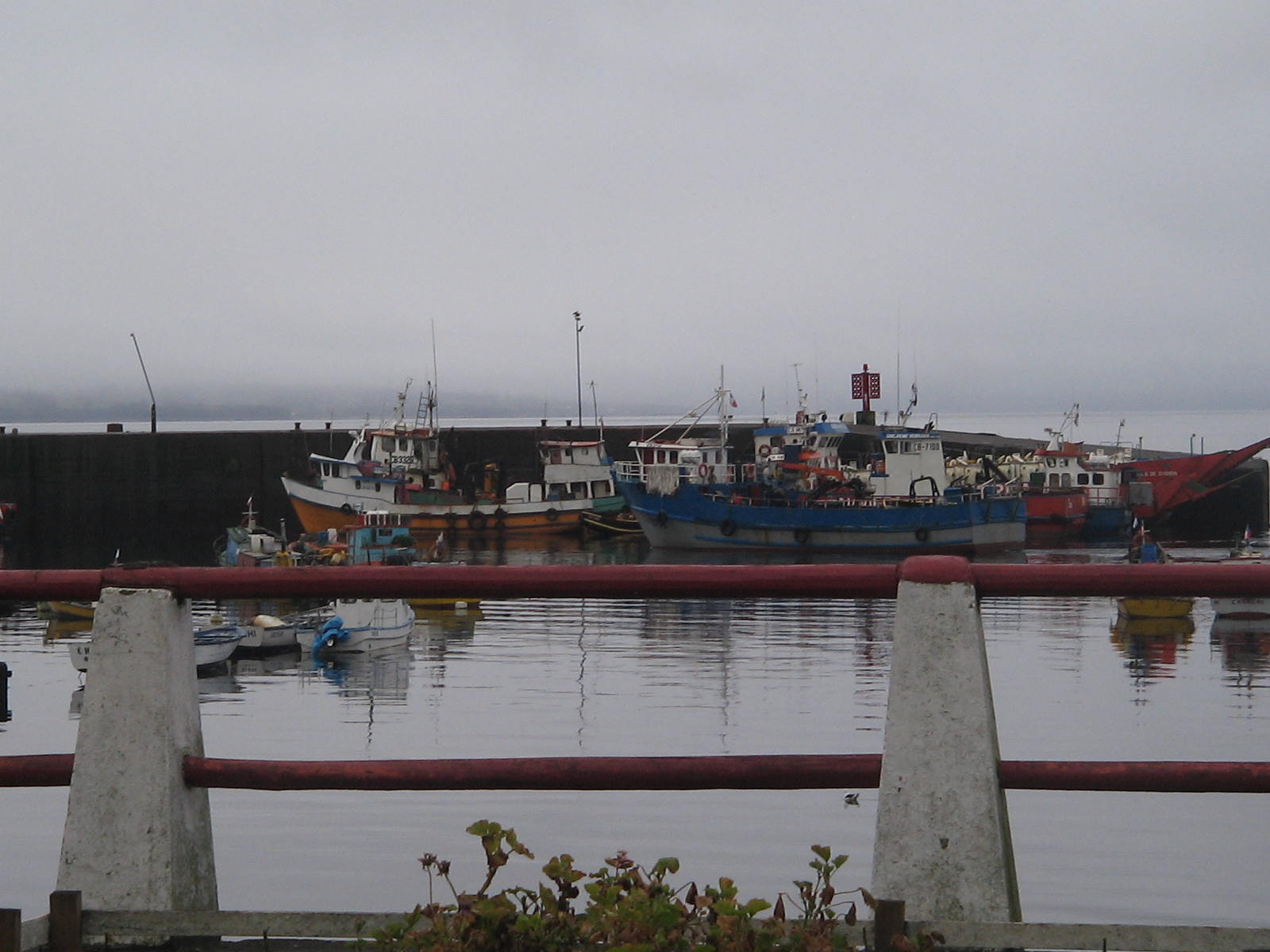
Embarcaciones en el muelle Chonchi city port
