= Circles of latitude between the 40th parallel south and the 45th parallel south =

Circles of latitude

Following are circles of latitude between the 40th parallel south and the 45th parallel south:

== 41st parallel south ==
41st parallel south (interactive map)

The 41st parallel south is a circle of latitude that is 41 degrees south of the Earth's equatorial plane. It crosses the Atlantic Ocean, the Indian Ocean, Australasia, the Pacific Ocean and South America.

At this latitude the sun is visible for 15 hours, 8 minutes during the December solstice and 9 hours, 13 minutes during the June solstice.

=== Around the world ===
Starting at the Prime Meridian and heading eastwards, the parallel 41° south passes through:

Coordinates	Country, territory or ocean	Notes
41°0′S 0°0′E	Atlantic Ocean	
41°0′S 20°0′E	Indian Ocean	
41°0′S 144°37′E	Australia	Tasmania
41°0′S 145°45′E	Indian Ocean	Bass Strait
41°0′S 146°59′E	Australia	Tasmania
41°0′S 148°20′E	Pacific Ocean	Tasman Sea
41°0′S 172°6′E	New Zealand	South Island
41°0′S 173°0′E	Pacific Ocean	Tasman Bay
41°0′S 173°45′E	New Zealand	South Island
41°0′S 174°13′E	Pacific Ocean	Cook Strait
41°0′S 174°56′E	New Zealand	Wellington Region, North Island
41°0′S 176°7′E	Pacific Ocean	
41°0′S 73°56′W	Chile	Los Lagos Region – passing through Llanquihue Lake (at 41°0′S 72°50′W)
41°0′S 71°52′W	Argentina	Neuquén Province – passing through Nahuel Huapi Lake (at 41°0′S 71°32′W); Río Negro Province
41°0′S 65°11′W	Atlantic Ocean	San Matías Gulf
41°0′S 64°14′W	Argentina	Río Negro Province
41°0′S 62°38′W	Atlantic Ocean	

== 42nd parallel south ==
42nd parallel south (interactive map)

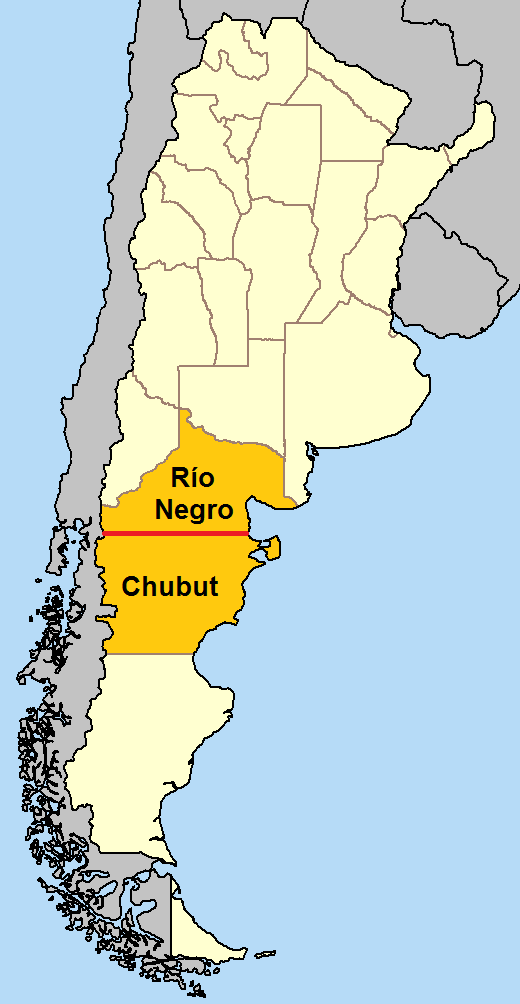
In Argentina, the 42nd parallel south defines the border between Río Negro Province and Chubut Province.

The 42nd parallel south is a circle of latitude that is 42 degrees south of the Earth's equatorial plane. It crosses the Atlantic Ocean, the Indian Ocean, Australasia, the Pacific Ocean and South America.

At this latitude the sun is visible for 15 hours, 15 minutes during the December solstice and 9 hours, 7 minutes during the June solstice.

The alcohol brand 42 Below was named in part because the 42nd parallel South passes through New Zealand.

=== Around the world ===
Starting at the Prime Meridian and heading eastwards, the parallel 42° south passes through:

Coordinates	Country, territory or ocean	Notes
42°0′S 0°0′E	Atlantic Ocean	
42°0′S 20°0′E	Indian Ocean	
42°0′S 145°13′E	Australia	Tasmania
42°0′S 148°17′E	Pacific Ocean	Tasman Sea
42°0′S 171°23′E	New Zealand	South Island
42°0′S 174°0′E	Pacific Ocean	
42°0′S 74°3′W	Chile	Chiloé Island (Los Lagos Region)
42°0′S 73°30′W	Pacific Ocean	Gulf of Ancud
42°0′S 72°44′W	Chile	Los Lagos Region
42°0′S 71°46′W	Argentina	The parallel defines the border between Río Negro Province and Chubut Province
42°0′S 65°4′W	Atlantic Ocean	

== 43rd parallel south ==
43rd parallel south (interactive map)

The 43rd parallel south is a circle of latitude that is 43 degrees south of the Earth's equatorial plane. It crosses the Atlantic Ocean, the Indian Ocean, Australasia, the Pacific Ocean and South America.

On December solstice the sun is at 70.83 degrees in the sky and on June solstice it is at 23.17 degrees.

At this latitude the sun is visible for 15 hours, 22 minutes during the Summer Solstice and 9 hours, 0 minutes during the Winter Solstice.

=== Around the world ===
Starting at the Prime Meridian and heading eastwards, the parallel 43° south passes through:

Coordinates	Country, territory or ocean	Notes
43°0′S 0°0′E	Atlantic Ocean	
43°0′S 20°0′E	Indian Ocean	
43°0′S 145°36′E	Australia	Tasmania
43°0′S 147°57′E	Pacific Ocean	Tasman Sea
43°0′S 170°34′E	New Zealand	West Coast region, Canterbury region
43°0′S 173°7′E	Pacific Ocean	
43°0′S 74°15′W	Chile	Chiloé Island, Los Lagos Region
43°0′S 73°21′W	Pacific Ocean	Gulf of Corcovado
43°0′S 72°45′W	Chile	Los Lagos Region
43°0′S 72°3′W	Argentina	Chubut Province
43°0′S 64°20′W	Atlantic Ocean	

== 44th parallel south ==
44th parallel south (interactive map)

The 44th parallel south is a circle of latitude that is 44 degrees south of the Earth's equatorial plane. It crosses the Atlantic Ocean, the Indian Ocean, Australasia, the Pacific Ocean and South America.

At this latitude the sun is visible for 15 hours, 29 minutes during the December solstice and 8 hours, 53 minutes during the June solstice.

=== Around the world ===
Starting at the Prime Meridian and heading eastwards, the parallel 44° south passes through:

Coordinates	Country, territory or ocean	Notes
44°0′S 0°0′E	Atlantic Ocean	
44°0′S 20°0′E	Indian Ocean	
44°0′S 147°0′E	Pacific Ocean	Tasman Sea
44°0′S 168°30′E	New Zealand	West Coast region Otago region (briefly) Canterbury region – passing through Lake Tekapo and Hinds
44°0′S 171°56′E	Pacific Ocean	
44°0′S 176°39′W	New Zealand	Chatham Island
44°0′S 176°24′W	Pacific Ocean	
44°0′S 74°15′W	Chile	Leucayec Island, Guaitecas Archipelago, Aysén Region.
44°0′S 73°36′W	Pacific Ocean	Gulf of Corcovado
44°0′S 73°16′W	Chile	Northern slopes of Melimoyu volcano, Aysén Region.
44°0′S 71°44′W	Argentina	Chubut Province
44°0′S 65°15′W	Atlantic Ocean	

== 45th parallel south ==
45th parallel south (interactive map)

The 45th parallel south is a circle of latitude that is 45° south of the Earth's equator.

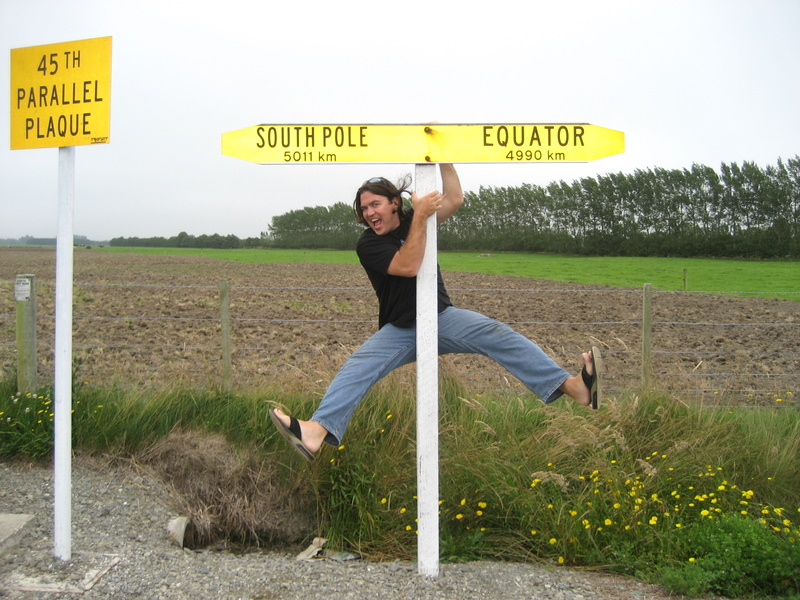
Highway sign marking the 45th parallel in New Zealand

It is the line that marks the theoretical halfway point between the equator and the South Pole. The true halfway point is 16.2 km (10.1 mi) south of this parallel because Earth is not a perfect sphere, but bulges at the equator and is flattened at the poles.

Unlike its northern counterpart, almost all (97%) of it passes through open ocean. It crosses the South Atlantic Ocean, the Indian Ocean, Australasia (New Zealand and just south of Tasmania), the Southern Ocean, and Patagonia.

At this latitude, daytime lasts for 15 hours, 37 minutes during the December solstice and 8 hours, 46 minutes during the June solstice for the dates in 2024. This holds true regardless of longitude. The midday Sun stands 21.17° above the northern horizon at the June solstice, 68.83° at the December solstice, and exactly 45.0° at either equinox.

=== Around the world ===
Starting at the Prime Meridian and heading eastwards, the parallel 45° south passes through:

Coordinates	Country, territory or ocean	Notes
45°0′S 0°0′E	Atlantic Ocean	
45°0′S 20°0′E	Indian Ocean	
45°0′S 147°0′E	Pacific Ocean	Tasman Sea
45°0′S 167°8′E	New Zealand	South Island, passing just north of the towns of Oamaru, Naseby, Cromwell and Queenstown, and through the small settlement of Becks
45°0′S 171°6′E	Pacific Ocean	Passing just south of Guamblin Island, Chile
45°0′S 74°23′W	Chile	Islands in the Chonos Archipelago including James Island and Melchor Island, and Moraleda Channel before reaching the mainland near Macá Volcano.
45°0′S 71°33′W	Argentina	Chubut Province
45°0′S 65°35′W	Atlantic Ocean	

== See also ==
- 45×90 points
- Circles of latitude between the 35th parallel south and the 40th parallel south
- Circles of latitude between the 45th parallel south and the 50th parallel south
