= Melinka Airport =

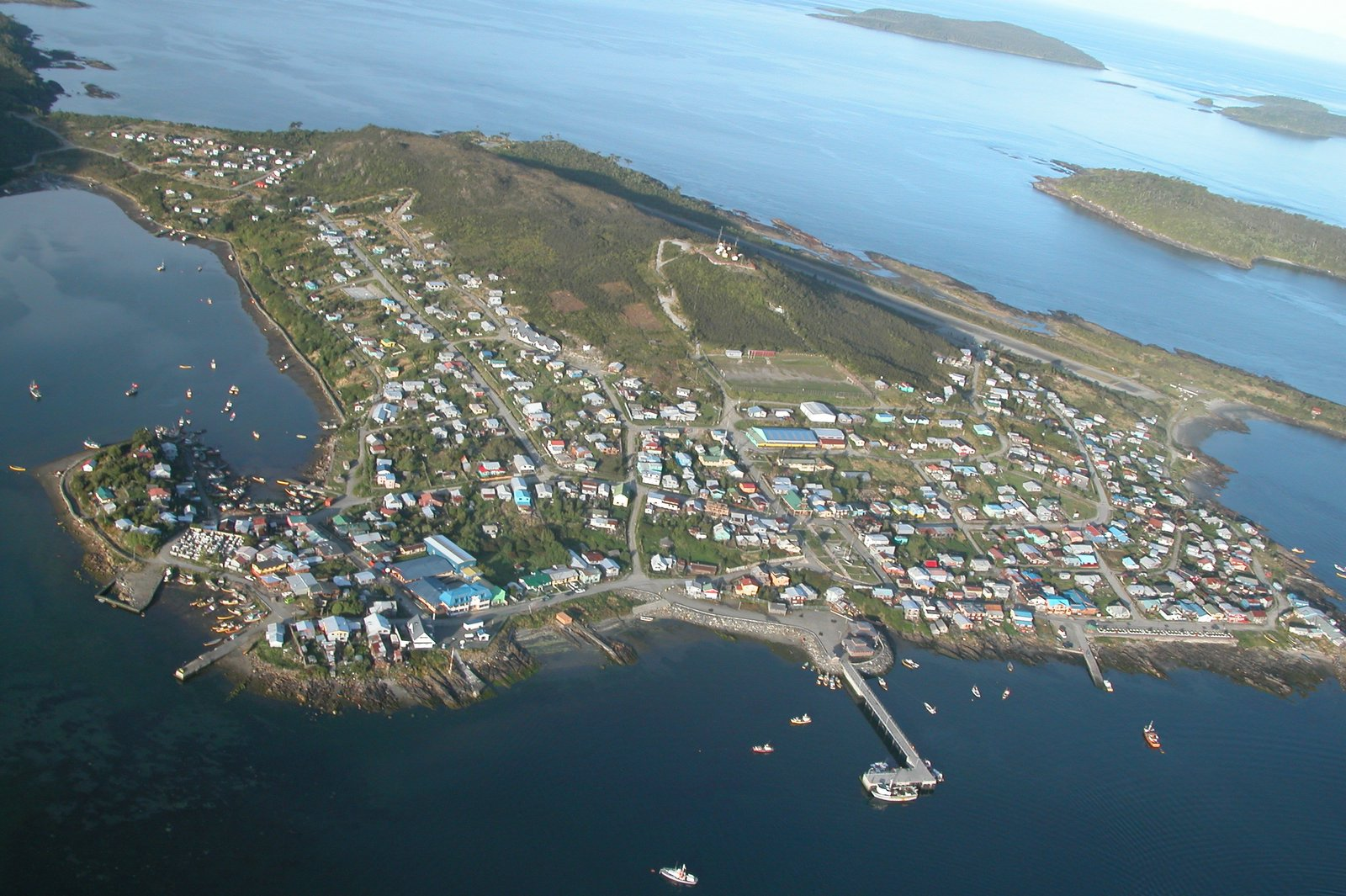
- Melinka, with Melinka Airport in the background.
- IATA: none; ICAO: SCMK

Summary
- Airport type: Public
- Serves: Melinka, Chile
- Elevation AMSL: 35 ft / 11 m
- Coordinates: 43°53′40″S 73°44′20″W

Map
- Location of Melinka Airport in Chile

Runways
Direction	Length		Surface
Direction	m	ft	Surface
18/36	800	2,625	Asphalt
- Source: Landings.com Google Maps GCM

Melinka Airport (ICAO: SCMK) is an airport serving Melinka, a port town in the Guaitecas Archipelago of the Aysén Region of Chile.

The airport and town are on a small peninsula off Isla Ascensión. North and south approach and departure are over the water.

== See also ==
- Transport in Chile
- List of airports in Chile
