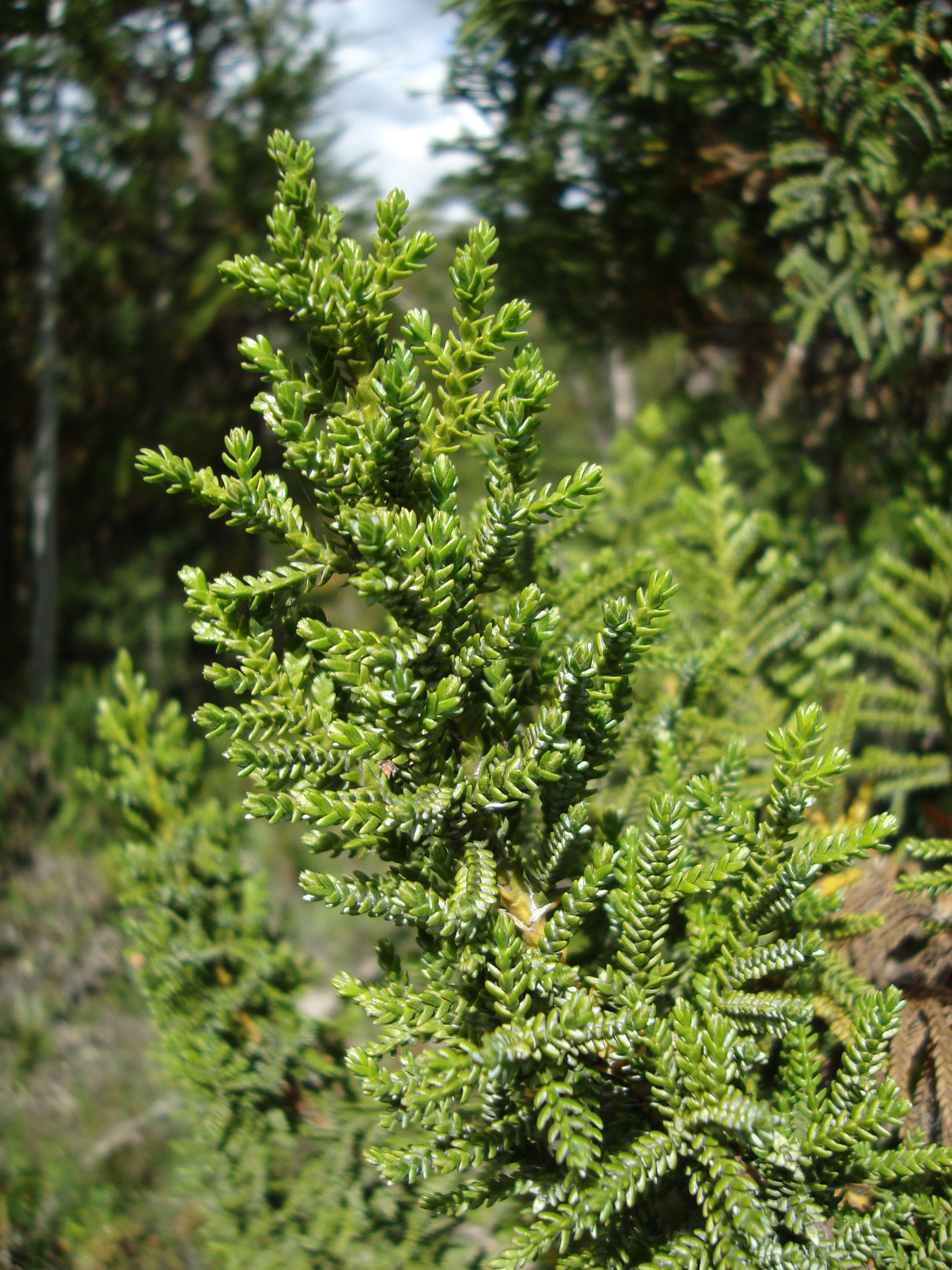

Conservation status
- Vulnerable (IUCN 3.1)
- CITES Appendix I

Scientific classification
- Kingdom: Plantae
- Clade: Tracheophytes
- Clade: Gymnosperms
- Division: Pinophyta
- Class: Pinopsida
- Order: Cupressales
- Family: Cupressaceae
- Subfamily: Callitroideae
- Genus: Pilgerodendron; Florin
- Species: P. uviferum

Binomial name
- Pilgerodendron uviferum (D.Don) Florin

Synonyms
- Juniperus uvifera D.Don; Libocedrus uvifera (D.Don) Pilg.; Thuja tetragona Hook.; Libocedrus tetragona (Hook.) Endl.

= Pilgerodendron =

Species of plant

Pilgerodendron is a monotypic genus of conifer in the cypress family, Cupressaceae, containing the sole species, Pilgerodendron uviferum, which is endemic to the Valdivian temperate rain forests and Magellanic subpolar forests of southern Chile and southwestern Argentina. It grows from 40 to 54°20' S in Tierra del Fuego, where it is the southernmost conifer species in the world. It is a member of subfamily Callitroideae, a group of distinct Southern Hemisphere genera associated with the Antarctic flora.

Pilgerodendron is very closely related to the New Zealand and New Caledonian genus Libocedrus, and many botanists treat P. uviferum within this genus, as Libocedrus uvifera (D.Don) Pilg. It is also a taxonomical synonym for Libocedrus tetragona (Hooker). The species is known locally as ciprés de las Guaitecas (after the Guaitecas Archipelago), and elsewhere by its scientific name, as pilgerodendron. The genus is named after Robert Knud Friedrich Pilger.

P. uviferum is a dioecious, slow-growing, narrowly conical coniferous tree that grows from 2–20 m in height, with a trunk up to 1.5 m in diameter. Taller specimens and wider trunks (reportedly up to 3 m in diameter) are known to have existed before it was overexploited. The leaves are scale-like and arranged in decussate pairs, with each leaf equal in size, giving the shoots a square cross-section (unlike the Libocedrus species, where pairs of larger leaves alternate with pairs of smaller leaves, giving a somewhat flattened shoot). The seed cones are 5–12 mm long and 4–6 mm broad, with four scales, two sterile basal scales and two fertile scales; each scale has a slender spine-like bract, and each fertile scale has two winged seeds 3–4 mm long. The pollen cones are 5–10 mm long and 2 mm broad, with 12–20 scales.

It is found in the evergreen coastal lowland forests along the Pacific coast of southern Patagonia, in association with the flowering evergreens Nothofagus betuloides and Drimys winteri. It is also found in open stands in sheltered bogs farther inland, where it is often locally dominant, and ranges as far as the eastern slopes of the Andes in southwestern Argentina. Forest dominated by Pilgerodendron are known as cipresales. The forests are common in the southern half of Chiloé Island where occupy many of flattish areas. At the northern end of its range it is found in association with Fitzroya cupressoides. The northernmost natural stands are found in 39°50' in the vicinity of the city of Valdivia. The conservation status of P. uviferu, in the far north of its natural distribution is poor, being fragmented by exotic plantations, threatened by livestock and having been decimated by lumberjacks and wildfires in the past. It has also been planted along the northern part of the Pacific Coast of the United States.

At present much Pilgerodendron uviferum grow in the Andes and in the Chilean Coast Range. However, during the interstadials of the region's last glacial period, P. uviferum grew in lowland areas such as the Central Valley, where it is now absent. Remaining lowland populations are thought to be relicts that have survived the warmer climate of the Holocene.

The wood of P. uviferum is yellow-reddish and has a distinct spicy-resinous smell, and is highly resistant to decay, which has made it very valuable as a source of timber for building construction in its native range. Much of its original lowland habitat has been cleared for this and other reasons. Due to over-exploitation, the species is now much scarcer than formerly, and is accordingly listed under CITES Appendix I, meaning commercial international trade is prohibited. P. uviferum is considered threatened by the World Conservation Monitoring Centre and vulnerable by the International Union for Conservation of Nature.

== History ==
Indigenous sea-faring nomads of the Chono and Kawésqars groups used Pilgerodendron uviferum as firewood as well as wood for oars, boats and houses. During the Antonio de Vea expedition (1675–1676) Spanish explorers visited the Guaitecas and Chonos archipelagoes where the tree grew noticing the similarity to the "cypresses of Spain".

Historically the wood was used to make railway sleepers, but eventually became popular for use as timber in all types of construction. In the 1860s, Felipe Westhoff was one of various businessmen who exported Pilgerodendron uviferum north to Chilean and Peruvian ports. Westhoff, who was based in Ancud, came initially as an agent of Ferrocarril Central Andino in Peru to purchase sleepers but soon became an independent businessman.

The town of Melinka was established in 1860 during the Pilgerodendron boom. This was the first permanent settlement in the Guaitecas Archipelago. After Westhoff's retirement in the 1870s, Ciriaco Álvarez, a native of Chonchi, rose as the most prominent P. uviferum businessman in the area, and was dubbed "The King of Pilgerodendron" (Spanish: El Rey del Ciprés). Many of the wooden structures in settlements of the southern Chilean archipelagos are built largely from P. uviferum wood.

Foraging by southern pudu is thought to be detrimental for the regeneration of burned forests of Pilgerodendron uviferum.
