= 43rd parallel =

43rd parallel may refer to:

- 43rd parallel north, a circle of latitude in the Northern Hemisphere
- 43rd parallel south, a circle of latitude in the Southern Hemisphere
