= Ciriaco Álvarez =

Ciriaco Álvarez was a businessman from Chonchi, Chiloé who rose to prominence in the exploitation of Pilgerodendron uviferum (Spanish: ciprés de las Guaitecas) in the southern Chilean archipelagoes. His dominance of the industry led him being dubbed "The King of Pilgerodendron" (Spanish: El Rey del Ciprés). The chief export products of Álvarez were poles and vine training stacks that went to northern Chile and Peru. To make vine stacks smaller Pilgerodendron than usual were harvested. In 1880 Álvarez established a small shop at río Álvarez in the Patagonian mainland, between present-day Puerto Chacabuco and Puerto Aysén. Álvarez remained active in the industry until the 1920s.

Álvarez industry had great effects on the incipient economic development that came to link the archipelagoes of Chiloé, Guaitecas and Chonos.
