= 41st parallel =

41st parallel may refer to:

- 41st parallel north, a circle of latitude in the Northern Hemisphere
- 41st parallel south, a circle of latitude in the Southern Hemisphere
