= 44th parallel =

44th parallel may refer to:

- 44th parallel north, a circle of latitude in the Northern Hemisphere
- 44th parallel south, a circle of latitude in the Southern Hemisphere
