= Traiguén Formation =

Geologic formation in Chile

- Stratigraphic range: Early Miocene
- Type: Geological formation

Lithology
- Primary: Tuff, basaltic pillow lava, breccia, sandstone, shale

Location
- Coordinates: 45.2°S 74.5°W
- Region: Aysén Region
- Country: Chile

Type section
- Named for: Traiguén Island
- Named by: Espinoza & Fuenzalida
- Year defined: 1971
- Traiguén Formation (Chile)

Traiguén Formation (Spanish: Formación Traiguén) is a volcano-sedimentary formation of Miocene age, located in the archipelagoes of Aysén Region of western Patagonia.

== Geology ==
The volcanic and sedimentary rocks were deposited in a marine environment. Neither the base nor the top of the formation is known. Copious dykes of basic composition and aphanitic texture intrude the formation.

At some locations Miocene plutons of the North Patagonian Batholith intrude the Traiguén Formation. The intruded plutons are of varied composition including gabbro and granodiorite.

== See also ==
- Geology of Aysén Region
- Stratigraphy of Chile
