= Victoria Island (Chile) =

Island in Chile

Native name: Isla Victoria
- Location within Chile

Geography
- Coordinates: Country file Chile 45.2902°S 73.9486°W
- Archipelago: Chonos
- Adjacent to: Pacific Ocean
- Area: 354 km^{2} (137 sq mi)

Administration
- Chile
- Region: Aisén

Additional information
- NGA UFI=-904337

Victoria Island (Chile) (Spanish Isla Victoria) is an island in the Chonos Archipelago of Chile.

== See also ==
- List of islands of Chile
