= Benjamin Island =

Native name: Isla Benjamín
- Location within Chile

Geography
- Coordinates: 44.67792°S 74.104977°W
- Adjacent to: Pacific Ocean
- Area: 618.2 km^{2} (238.7 sq mi)
- Coastline: 215.9 km (134.15 mi)(scale 1:1000000)

Administration
- Chile
- Region: Aisén

Additional information
- NGA UFI=-873523

Benjamin Island (Spanish Isla Benjamin) is an island in the Chonos Archipelago of Chile.

== See also ==
- List of islands of Chile
