= Pedro Ñancúpel =

- Born: c. 1837; Terao, Chiloé, Chile
- Died: 6 November 1888 (aged 51); Castro, Chiloé, Chile
- Cause of death: Shot by firing squad
- Resting place: Parochial Cemetery of Castro
- Occupations: Fisherman, hunter, lumberjack, pirate
- Spouse: Paula Ñancalahuén
- Criminal charges: Piracy
- Penalty: Execution

Details
- Victims: 20+ (persecuted); 99 (claimed)
- Country: Chile
- Locations: Chiloé, Guaitecas
- Date apprehended: 6 August 1886

Pedro María Ñancúpel Alarcón (c. 1837 – 6 November 1888) was a pirate and outlaw of Huilliche descent active in the archipelagoes of Chiloé, Guaitecas and other places in the fjords and channels of Patagonia in the 1880s, forming part of the pirate crew led by José Domingo Nahuelhuén. Ñancúpel was captured in Melinka in 1886 and bought into justice in Ancud the same year, being accused of several murders that the pirate crew had taken part in. He was later acquitted, successfully proving that he was not with the crew at the time of the murders. After being freed detainment in Ancud, he was captured once again a few years later and again accused of piracy and multiple murders and was subsequently executed by firing squad on 6 November 1888. He was said at the time to have killed 99 persons, but he was only ever tried for the deaths of just over 20 people.
