= Tarahuín Lake =

Lake in Chile

- Location within Chile
- Coordinates: 42°42′52.30″S 73°44′11.76″W
- Catchment area: 38.1 km^{2} (14.7 sq mi)
- Basin countries: Chile
- Max. length: 6.4 km (4.0 mi)
- Max. width: 1.5 km (0.93 mi)
- Min. width: 0.5 km (0.31 mi)
- Surface area: 7.7 km^{2} (3.0 sq mi)
- Average depth: 22.2 m (73 ft)
- Max. depth: 33 m (108 ft)
- Water volume: 0.170 km^{3} (0.041 cu mi)
- Shore length^{1}: 20.0 km (12.4 mi)
- Surface elevation: 66 m (217 ft)
- ^{1} Shore length is not a well-defined measure.

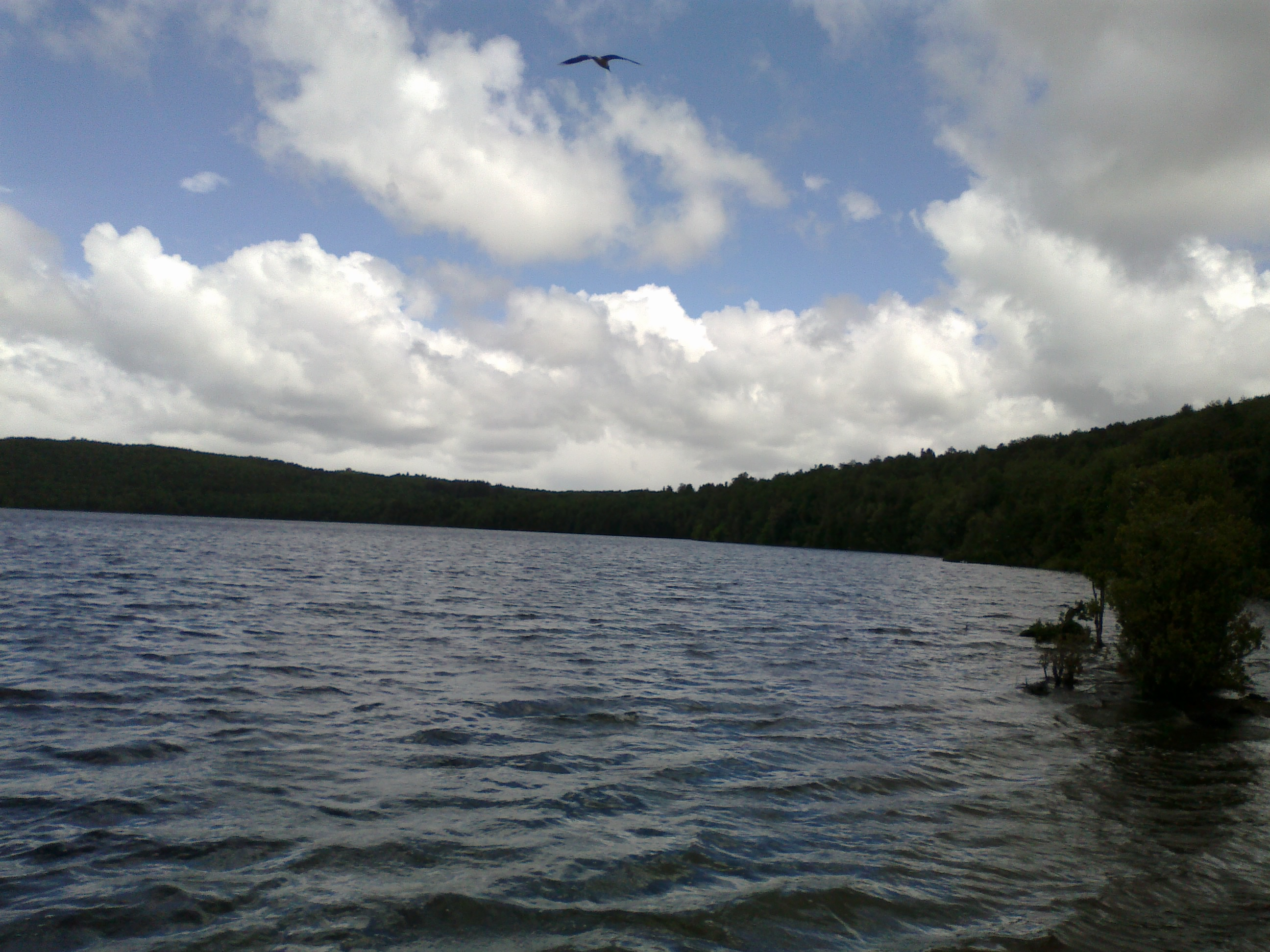
View of Tarahuín Lake

Tarahuín Lake (Spanish: Lago Tarahuín) is a lake in south-central Chiloé Island, Chile. It has an area of 7.7 square kilometres (3.0 sq mi). The lake's catchment basin is mostly made up of hilly terrain that is covered by native forest, and to a lesser extent natural prairies.

Chile Route 5 passes next to the lake's western end.
