= Aysén, Chile =

Aysén Aisén
- Commune
- Location of the Commune of Aysén in Aysén del General Carlos Ibáñez del Campo Region Location in Chile
- Coordinates: 45°24′S 72°42′W
- Country: Chile
- Region: Aysén
- Province: Aysén
- Founded: 1957

Government
  - Type: Municipality
  - Alcalde: Julio Uribe Alvarado (Ind)

Area
  - Total: 29,970.4 km^{2} (11,571.6 sq mi)
- Elevation: 8 m (26 ft)

Population (2012 Census)
  - Total: 22,421
  - Density: 0.74810/km^{2} (1.9376/sq mi)
  - Urban: 19,580
  - Rural: 2,773

Sex
  - Men: 11853
  - Women: 10500
- Time zone: UTC-4 (CLT)
  - Summer (DST): UTC-3 (CLST)
- Area code: 56 + 67
- Website: Official website (in Spanish)

Aysén or Aisén (pronounced: /aɪˈsɛn/ eye-SEN) is a Chilean commune located in Aysén Province, Aysén del General Carlos Ibáñez del Campo Region. It is home to the city of Puerto Aysén and to the towns of Villa Mañiguales and Puerto Chacabuco. It is the largest commune in Chile in total area, and it is slightly larger than Armenia.

== A note on orthography ==
Chile’s Instituto Geográfico Militar (IGM) prefers the spelling Aisén, as did formerly the Instituto Nacional de Estadísticas (INE). However, since 2010 the INE has conformed to the locally preferred, and overwhelmingly more frequently used, form Aysén.

== Demographics ==
Historical population
Year	Pop.	±% p.a.
1930	6,835	—
1940	13,751	+7.24%
1952	8,754	−3.69%
1970	13,525	+2.45%
1982	13,538	+0.01%
1992	19,090	+3.50%
2002	22,353	+1.59%
2017	23,959	+0.46%
2024	23,170	−0.48%
Source: "Censo de Población y Vivienda". National Statistics Institute.

According to the 2002 INE census, Aysén had 22,353 inhabitants (11,853 males and 10,500 females), of whom 19,580 (87.6%) lived in urban areas and 2,773 (12.4%) in rural areas at that time. Between the censuses of 1992 and 2002 the population had grown by 17.1% (3,263 persons).

== Administration ==
As a commune, Aysén is a third-level administrative division of Chile administered by a municipal council, headed by an alcalde who is directly elected every four years. As of October 2024, the current alcalde was Julio Uribe Alvarado.

Within the electoral divisions of Chile, Aysén is represented in the Chamber of Deputies by René Alinco (PDC) and David Sandoval (UDI) as part of the 59th electoral district, which includes the entire Aysén del General Carlos Ibáñez del Campo Region. The commune is represented in the Senate by Antonio Horvath Kiss (RN) and Patricio Walker Prieto (PDC) as part of the 18th senatorial constituency (Aysén del General Carlos Ibáñez del Campo Region).
