= Melinka =

Melinka Isla Melinca
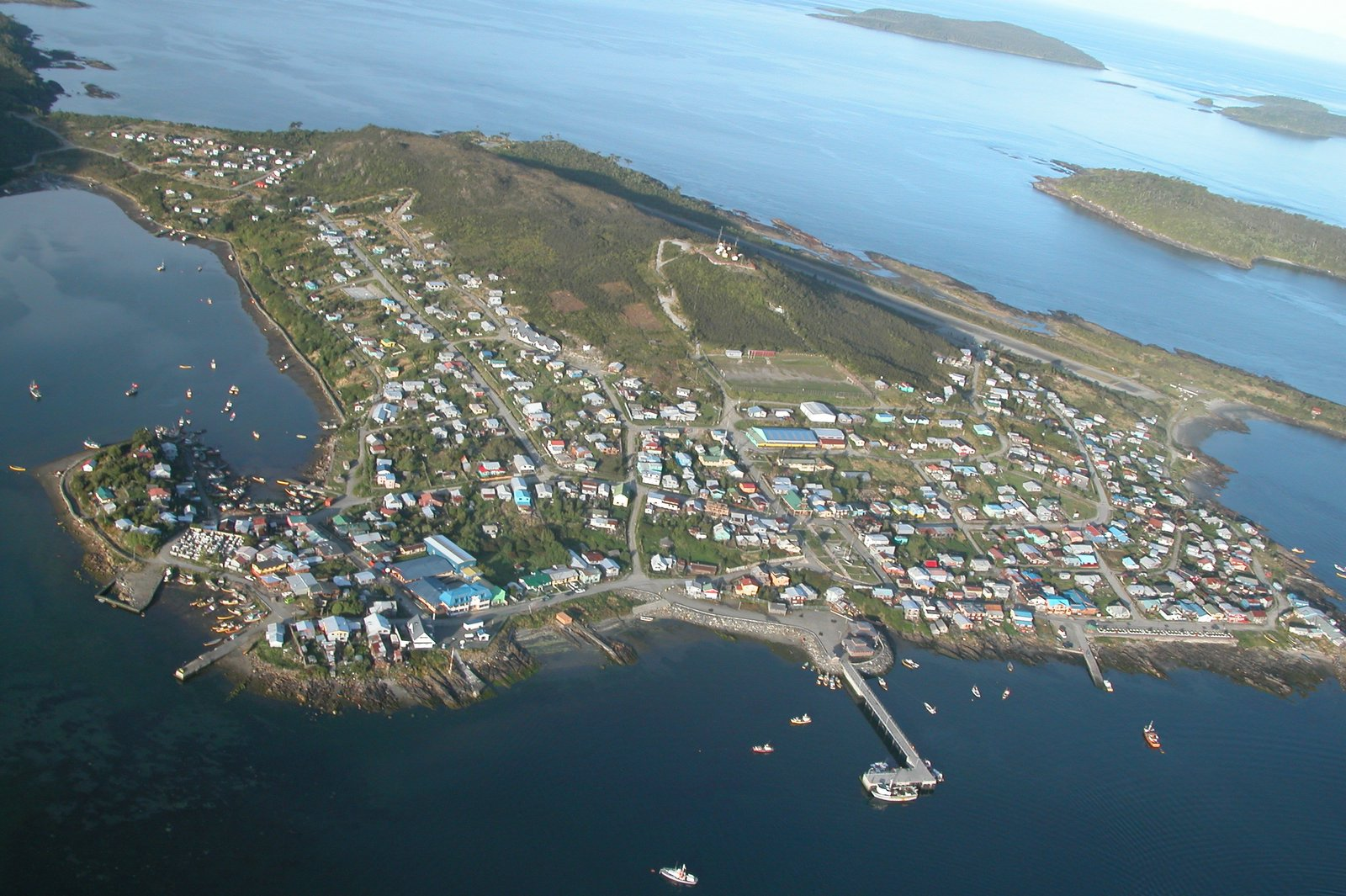
- Aerial view of Melinka

- Location in Chile
- Coordinates: 43°53′52″S 73°44′38″W
- Region: Aisén
- Province: Aisén
- Commune: Guaitecas

Government
  - Alcalde: Luis Antonio Miranda Chiguay

Population (2017)
  - Total: 1,329

Sex
  - Men: 717
  - Women: 612
- Time zone: UTC−04:00 (Chilean Standard)
  - Summer (DST): UTC−03:00 (Chilean Daylight)
- Climate: Cfb

Melinka is a Chilean town in Aysén Province, Aysén Region. It is located on Ascención Island and is the administrative center of the commune of Guaitecas since 1979.

The town is on a small peninsula off the main island, and shelters a small harbor. The island is in the Guaitecas Archipelago, at the southern end of the Gulf of Corcovado. Melinka is served by Melinka Airport and is connected by gravel road to the hamlets of Repollal.

Melinka is culturally similar to Chiloé Archipelago but its inhabitants custom to bring dogs on board in their travels is likely rooted in native Chono traditions.

In 2017 Melinka had a population of 1329 inhabitants down from 1411 in 2002.

== History ==
Prior to its founding in 1860 the location of Melinka was known as Puerto Arenas (literally "Port Sand") by whalers who visited the area regularly. Melinka was founded in 1860 by the German immigrant, Felipe Arnold Westhoff. Westhoff had been commissioned to supply railway sleepers to Ferrocarril Central Andino in Peru. At the time the Guaitecas Archipelago was still part of Chiloé Province. In the first years of Melinka a series of indigenous tombs were discovered while building houses. From Melinka Westhoff exported Pilgerodendron uviferum (Spanish: ciprés de las Guaitecas) that made excellent wood for sleepers. In 1870 the port was charted by Enrique Simpson on board Chacabuco.

The famous pirate Pedro Ñancúpel was captured in Melinka in 1886 and bought into justice in Ancud the same year.

According to a local tradition the word melinka comes from Russian and means lovely. In fact, there is the Russian archaic colloquialism милёнка (transl. milyonka) which means "lovely." Westhoff who came from Lithuania in the Russian Empire named Melinka after his sister.

== Climate ==
Melinka has a wet oceanic climate (Köppen climate classification: Cfb).

Climate data for Melinka
Month	Jan	Feb	Mar	Apr	May	Jun	Jul	Aug	Sep	Oct	Nov	Dec	Year
Mean daily maximum °C (°F)	17.4 (63.3)	17.2 (63.0)	15.9 (60.6)	13.6 (56.5)	11.3 (52.3)	10.1 (50.2)	10.0 (50.0)	10.0 (50.0)	10.9 (51.6)	13.2 (55.8)	13.8 (56.8)	15.7 (60.3)	13.3 (55.9)
Daily mean °C (°F)	13.3 (55.9)	13.2 (55.8)	12.0 (53.6)	10.4 (50.7)	8.8 (47.8)	7.7 (45.9)	7.6 (45.7)	7.3 (45.1)	7.8 (46.0)	9.5 (49.1)	10.3 (50.5)	12.0 (53.6)	10.0 (50.0)
Mean daily minimum °C (°F)	9.6 (49.3)	9.5 (49.1)	8.7 (47.7)	7.4 (45.3)	6.0 (42.8)	5.0 (41.0)	5.0 (41.0)	4.6 (40.3)	4.8 (40.6)	6.1 (43.0)	7.0 (44.6)	8.5 (47.3)	6.9 (44.4)
Average precipitation mm (inches)	152.2 (5.99)	168.2 (6.62)	216.8 (8.54)	270.1 (10.63)	349.4 (13.76)	367.8 (14.48)	382.5 (15.06)	325.2 (12.80)	256.9 (10.11)	191.6 (7.54)	247.0 (9.72)	246.0 (9.69)	3,137.7 (123.53)
Source: Bioclimatografia de Chile

== See also ==
- List of towns in Chile
