= Tepuhueico Lake =

Lake in Chile

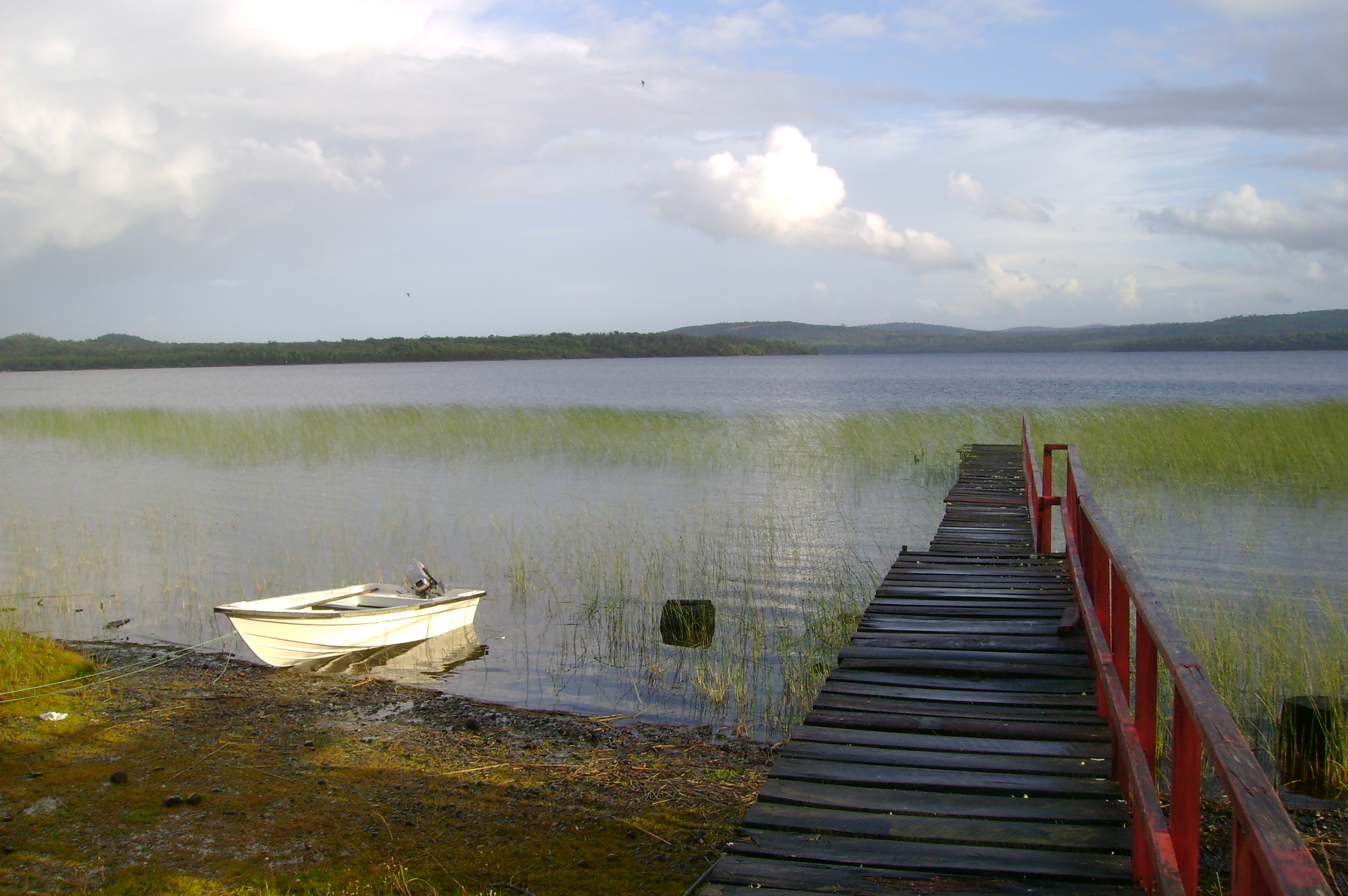
- Lago Tepuhueico, Chiloé

- Location within Chile
- Coordinates: 42°47′20.60″S 73°57′51.09″W
- Catchment area: 182.1 km^{2} (70.3 sq mi)
- Basin countries: Chile
- Max. length: 5.2 km (3.2 mi)
- Max. width: 3.1 km (1.9 mi)
- Min. width: 1.9 km (1.2 mi)
- Surface area: 14.3 km^{2} (5.5 sq mi)
- Average depth: 9 m (30 ft)
- Max. depth: 25 m (82 ft)
- Water volume: 0.128 km^{3} (0.031 cu mi)
- Shore length^{1}: 24.7 km (15.3 mi)
- Surface elevation: 25 m (82 ft)
- ^{1} Shore length is not a well-defined measure.

Tepuheuico Lake (Spanish: Lago Tepuhueico) lies in south-central Chiloé Island, Chile. It has an area of 14.3 square kilometres (5.5 sq mi). The lake's catchment basin is mostly made up of gentle slopes and hilly terrain that is covered by native forest.
