= Guaitecas Archipelago =

Islands on the southwestern coast of Chile

Native name: Archipiélago de las Guaitecas
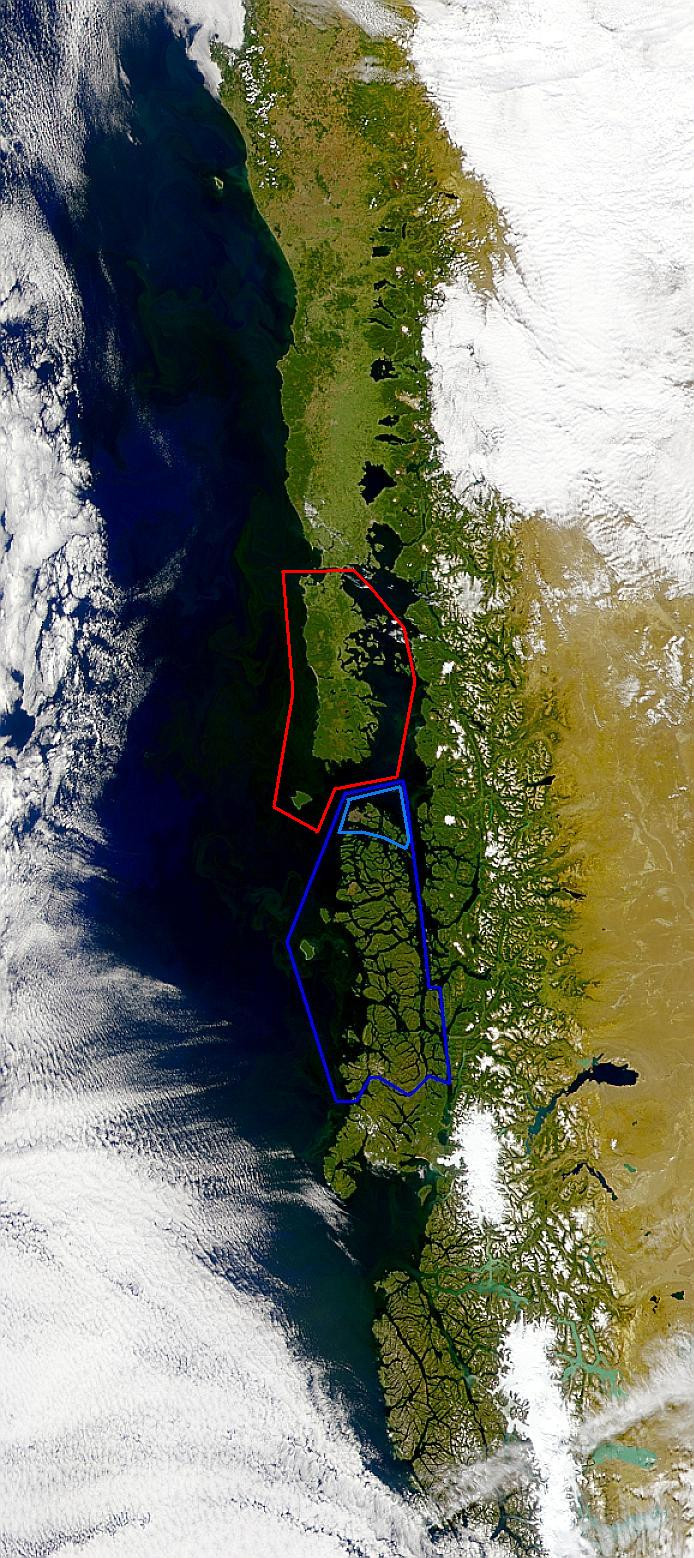
- Guaitecas Archipelago is marked with light blue, Chonos Archipelago with dark blue and Chiloé Archipelago is marked with red.

Geography
- Coordinates: 43.921322°S 73.825841°W
- Adjacent to: Open Pacific Ocean, Gulf of Corcovado, Moraleda Channel, Tuamapu Channel, Paso del Chacao
- Major islands: Gran Guaiteca, Ascención, Betecoy, Clotilde, Leucayec, Elvira, Sánchez, Mulchey
- Highest elevation: 369 m (1211 ft)

Administration
- Chile
- Region: Aisén
- Province: Aisén
- Commune: Guaitecas

Demographics
- Population: 1,843 (2017)
- Ethnic groups: Chileans, including Chilote-Huilliches. Formerly: Chonos

Additional information
- NGA UFI=-877176

The Guaitecas Archipelago is a sparsely populated archipelago in the Aisén region of Chile. The archipelago is made up of eight main islands and numerous smaller ones. The eight largest islands are from northwest to southeast: Gran Guaiteca, Ascención, Betecoy, Clotilde, Leucayec, Elvira, Sánchez and Mulchey. The islands have subdued topography compared to the Andes, with Gran Guaiteca containing the archipelago's high point at 369 m (1,211 ft).

The main settlement in the archipelago is Melinka, a port town with an economy revolving around fishing and salmon aquaculture. Most islands are forested, rocky with recurrent peat bogs. The archipelago waters are renowned for their rich whale and dolphin fauna. The climate is cool, rainy and oceanic. Historically the islands were inhabited by semi-nomad and seafaring Chonos and lay beyond the southernmost outposts of the Spanish Empire. In the second half of the 19th century, the islands became permanently settled as consequence of a wood logging boom centered on Ciprés de las Guaitecas (Pilgerodendron uviferum), a tree named after the archipelago. Culturally the northwestern part of the archipelago is similar to the Chiloé Archipelago.

== Climate and vegetation ==
Islas Guaitecas

Climate chart (precipitation, max. and min. temperature)
J	F	M	A	M	J	J	A	S	O	N	D
119 12 7	117 12 8	91 11 7	153 8 5	229 7 3	280 6 2	207 4 1	272 6 4	162 6 3	132 9 4	108 11 4	131 11 7
- █ Average max. and min. temperatures in °C
- █ Precipitation totals in mm
Imperial conversion
J	F	M	A	M	J	J	A	S	O	N	D
4.7 54 45	4.6 54 46	3.6 52 45	6 46 41	9 45 37	11 43 36	8.1 39 34	11 43 39	6.4 43 37	5.2 48 39	4.3 52 39	5.2 52 45
- █ Average max. and min. temperatures in °F
- █ Precipitation totals in inches

The archipelago has a rainy and cool maritime temperate climate. Mean annual precipitation at Melinka is of 3,173 mm (124.9 in). Mean annual temperature is about 7–9 °C (44.6–48.2 °F). From September to December high tides in combination with storms produce large waves that wash over land depositing sand and gravel onshore.

The main vegetation assemblage of the islands is the Bosque Siempreverde con Turberas de los Chonos (lit. "Chonos Evergreen Forest with Bogs") with the characteristic tree Pilgerodendron uviferum. Other trees in these forests are Nothofagus nitida (coigüe de Chiloé), Metrosideros stipularis (tepú) and Weinmannia trichosperma (tineo). In the ground of the more-less open Pilgerodendron forest cushion plants such as Astelia pumila, Donatia fascicularis and Oreobolus obtusangulus grow. In the western fringes of the archipelago the vegetation is made up of a c. 2-meter (6.6 ft) high shrubland of Pilgerondendron and Nothofagus nitida. Amidst this shrubland, occasional peatlands and forest exists.

Vegetation type changes from the shore towards the island's interior parts. Next to the sea, herbs and occasional wild potatoes grow. This is a zone of regular disturbance that is affected by winter storms. The wild potatoes that grow in the archipelago are mostly found in its western part. Apparently these potatoes do not reproduce by seeds and rarely produce flowers and fruits. Slightly inland from the herbaceous zone follows a belt of brushy thickets. This belt is followed by coastline forest that further away from the coasts gives way to a proper inland forest, which may contain peat bogs.

The archipelago contains 431 —or 2.8%— of Aysén Region's 15,240 ha of Sphagnum bogs.

=== Wildlife ===
A variety of whales and dolphins have been spotted in the archipelago waters including: Peale's dolphins, black dolphins, bottlenose dolphins, humpback whales, minke whales and killer whales. The Gulf of Corcovado to the north of the archipelago is "arguably the largest feeding and nursing ground for blue whales [...] in the entire Southern Hemisphere". All of this makes Guaitecas Archipelago a privileged place for whale watching.

== Geology ==
The bedrock of the archipelago is varied. In the northwest it is made of metamorphic rock, with rocks such as phyllite, metacherts and greenschist. In the southeast granitoids, lavas and brecciated lavas make most of the bedrock.

The archipelago bears various marks of erosion from the glaciers that repeatedly covered the area during the last 2 million years. Among these marks are the numerous skerries of rôche moutonnées that surround the main islands. Various channels between the islands are fjords shaped by glaciers and moraines in the archipelago are mostly to be found underwater.

A study based on archaeological sites shows an overall trend of uplift in the archipelago during the Holocene Epoch. The archipelago has been uplifted at rates of 0.57 m/ka to 5.42 m/ka during the Holocene.

The archipelago was affected by earthquakes in 1575, 1737, 1837, 1960 and 2016. The 1960 earthquake caused some subsidence in the archipelago.

== History ==
=== Prehistory ===
Radiocarbon dating of a shell midden in Gran Guaiteca has yielded an age of about 5,100 years B.P. making this a minimum age for human presence in the archipelago. Lithic artifacts found in the archipelago are usually made of basalt or andesite rock. In Pre-Hispanic and colonial times the archipelago was inhabited by Chonos, who lived as hunter-gatherers traveling by canoe. (Note: A speculative theory proposed by Ricardo E. Latcham holds that Chono arrived to the Guaitecas Archipelago from Chiloé Archipelago after these were invaded by Huilliche from the mainland in the 13th century.) The Chono used the many caves found in the archipelago as cemeteries, where remains were preserved as mummies.

The islands made up the southern limit of Pre-Hispanic agriculture as noted by the mention of the cultivation of potatoes by a Spanish expedition in 1557. (Note: Later in 1834, during the second voyage of HMS Beagle, Charles Darwin collected potatoes from Guaitecas.) (Note: The presence of maize in Guaitecas Archipelago is also mentioned by early Spanish explorers, albeit they may have misidentified the plant.)

=== Colonial Era ===
The Spanish, who had settled in Chiloé Archipelago since 1567 launched from there numerous southward expeditions over the next two and half centuries. (Note: Spanish authorities organized expeditions in 1578 and 1620, this last expedition reached San Rafael Lake. New southward expeditions followed in 1639, 1641, 1656–60, 1674 and 1675–6. Jesuits based in Chiloé Archipelago visited the islands south of Chiloé in 1609 and in 1613 for the first time they reached Guayaneco Archipelago. More jesuit expeditions followed in 1617, 1622, 1656, 1660, 1662 (Nicolás Mascardi), 1670, 1763, 1766–7 and 1767. As the Jesuits were suppressed Franciscans continued the expeditions in 1778, 1778–79, 1779-80.) These explorations were driven by religious motives in the case of Jesuits and by rumours about settlements made by rival colonial powers as well the search for the mythical City of the Caesars. In 1662 Jesuit missionary Nicolás Mascardi visited Guaitecas Archipelago constructing a rudimentary church on the islands. In the 1670s the islands were briefly visited by the expeditions of Bartolomé Gallardo and Antonio de Vea. However, efter this last expedition interest in the area by Spanish religious and military authorities waned until the 1740s.

Jesuit Mateo Esteban who visited the islands in the 17th century estimated its population at 170 individuals, 120 of which he managed to gather in a meeting. Following the crushing of the Huilliche rebellion of 1712 in Chiloé a small group of Huilliches went into hiding in Guaitecas Archipelago to avoid harsh Spanish reprimands.

As result of a corsair and pirate menace, Spanish authorities ordered the depopulation of the archipelago to deprive enemies of eventual support from native populations. (Note: In the aftermath of the wreck of HMS Wager in 1739 Marquis of the Ensenada briefly considered the establishment of a Spanish fort in Guaitecas Archieplago to guard against British incursions.) This led to the transfer of Chono population to Chiloé Archipelago in the north while other Chonos moved south of Taitao Peninsula effectively depopulating the territory. After this relations between remaining Chonos south of Guaitecas Archipelago and Spaniards and the inhabitants of Chiloé remained hostile up to the 19th century as attested by Enrique Simpson.

=== 18th and early 19th centuries: "Emptyness" ===
Following the decline of the Chono populations in the archipelago in the 18th century, the area gained a reputation of "emptyness" among Chileans akin to the description of eastern Patagonia as a "desert." However, the islands were often visited and traversed in the 19th century by fishermen, lumberjacks, and hunters from Chiloé. In 1834 during the second voyage of HMS Beagle Robert FitzRoy mapped the archipelago. FitzRoy noted that Puerto Low in the archieplago was permanently inhabited by people from Chiloé, which he did not identify as indigenous. Explorations sanctioned by the Chilean state begun with navy officer Francisco Hudson in 1857, Hudson and German settler Franz Fonck made explorations in Guaitecas Archipelago those years. With Hudson's death in 1859 Francisco Vidal Gormaz continued the explorations, a duty that Enrique Simpson assumed in the 1870s.

Simpson mapped Guaitecas Archipelago onboard of the corvette Chacabuco in the 1870s. He found FitzRoy's mapping of the northern part of the archipelago fine writing in 1870 that "Fitzroy's chart, that is quite exact until that point [Melinka 43°53' S], is worthless further ahead...". Thus, south of Melinka Simpson relied more in the late 18th century sketches of José de Moraleda y Montero.

Navy hydrographer Francisco Vidal Gormaz explored and charted the islands in the second half of the 19th century becoming critical of the work of Robert FitzRoy and Charles Darwin whom according to him had failed acknowledge the importance of the Patagonian islands. It is however clear that many of the explored areas were already known to the inhabitants of southern Chiloé who visited these areas for wood, fish or hunting.

=== Pilgerodendron Era ===
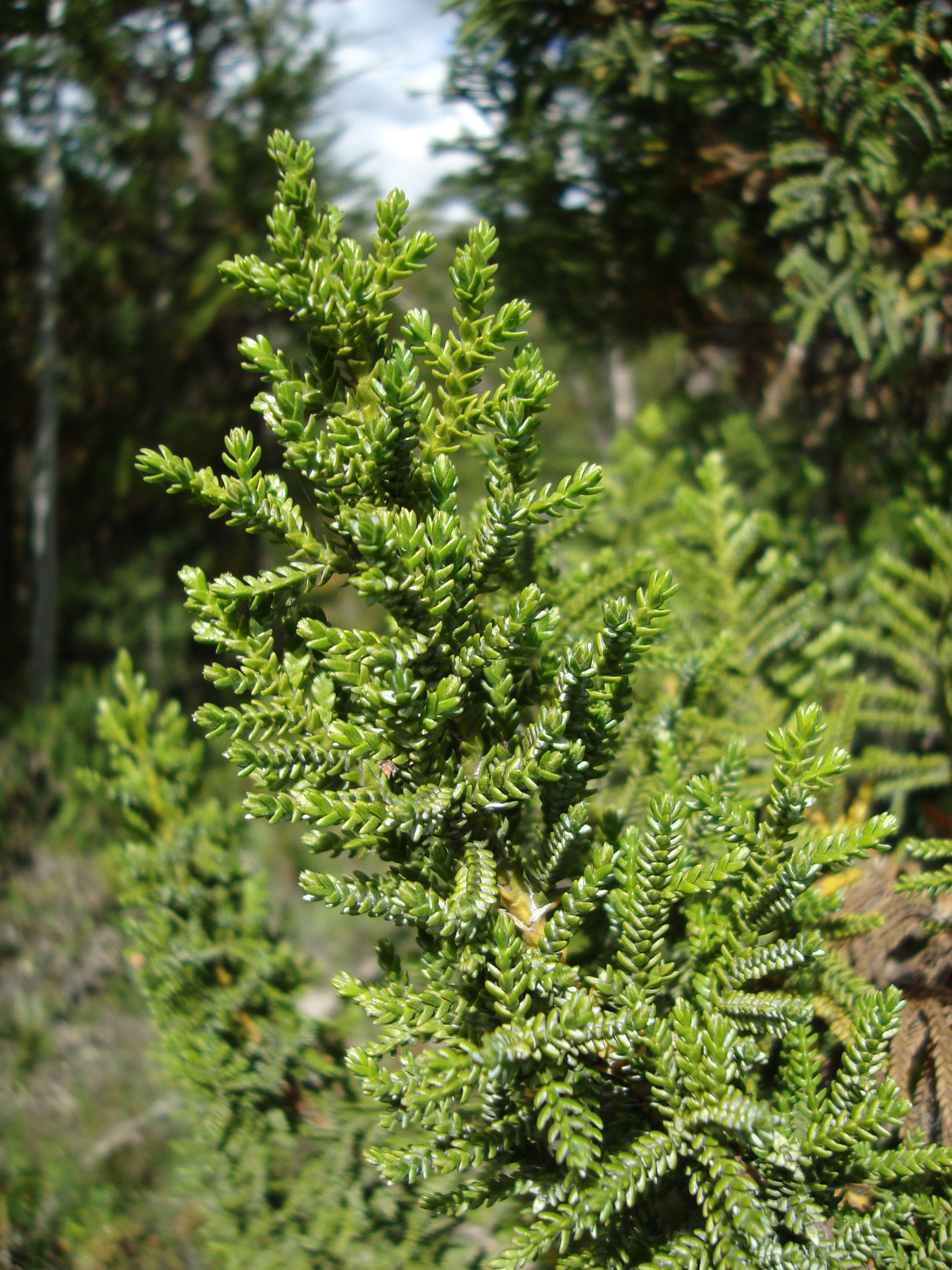
Pilgerodendron uviferum was exploited in the 19th and 20th centuries for its highly valued wood.

Felipe Westhoff, a German-Lithuanian immigrant who operated a Pilgerodendron uviferum logging business from Ancud, founded Melinka in 1860. This was the first permanent settlement in the archipelago. Chilean authorities granted Westhoff exclusive rights on Pilgerodendron extraction in the archipelago and bestowed him the title of subdelegado marítimo which gave him some duties and authority over the archipelago, in reality it meant little since he did not have the means to enforce the law or his rights. When Westhoff's time spent in the archipelago diminished in the early 1870s the title of subdelegado marítimo passed to his associate Enrique Lagrèze. After Westhoff's retirement in the 1870s Ciriaco Álvarez rose to prominence as the foremost Pilgerodendron businessman. The chief export products of Álvarez were poles and vine training stacks that went to northern Chile and Peru. Álvarez business owned him the nickname of "The King of Pilgerodendron" (Spanish: El Rey del Ciprés) and had great effects on the incipient economic development that came to link the archipelagoes of Chiloé, Guaitecas and Chonos.

Ever since the Pilgerodendron Era the archipelago and the other islands of Patagonia have had a reputation of lawlessness. Felipe Westhoff wrote:

...Such amount of people have led to violence, abuses, murder and other crimes, which local authorities have not been able to avert due to lack of armed forces at their disposal (...) That amount of peons, not bound, it can be said, godless and lawless, and without anything that hinder them to carry out their caprices or misdeeds

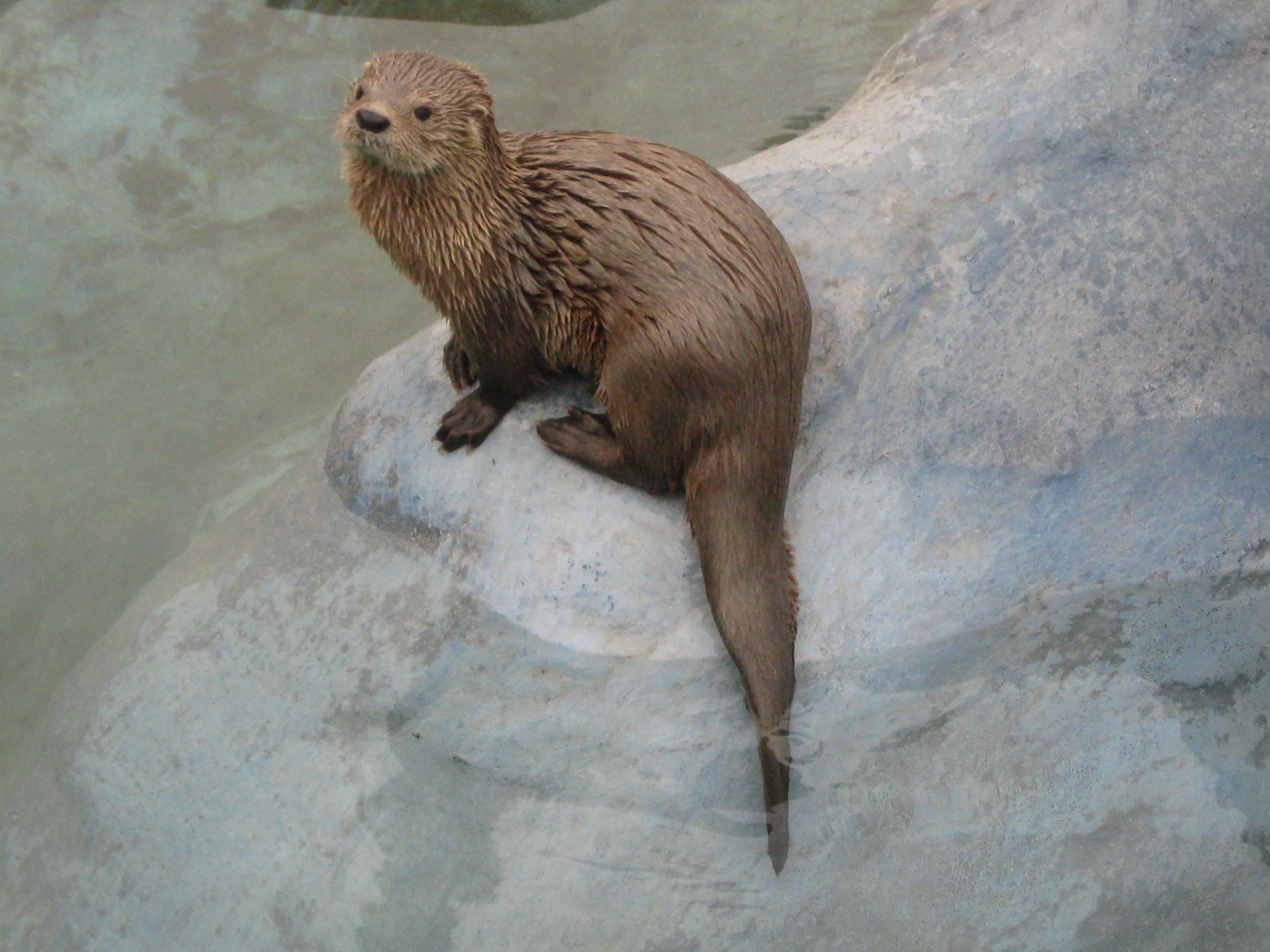
Marine otter was once hunted for its fur by people based in Melinka.

One of the most famous of the early outlaws was Pedro Ñancúpel a pirate who was captured in Melinka in 1886 and bought into justice in Ancud the same year.

19th century inhabitants of Melinka were engaged in fur trade. Fur was obtained from southern river otter and marine otter. Hunting was made with the aid of dogs. These hunters travelled often south beyond Taitao Peninsula to obtain furs.

== Demography and economy ==
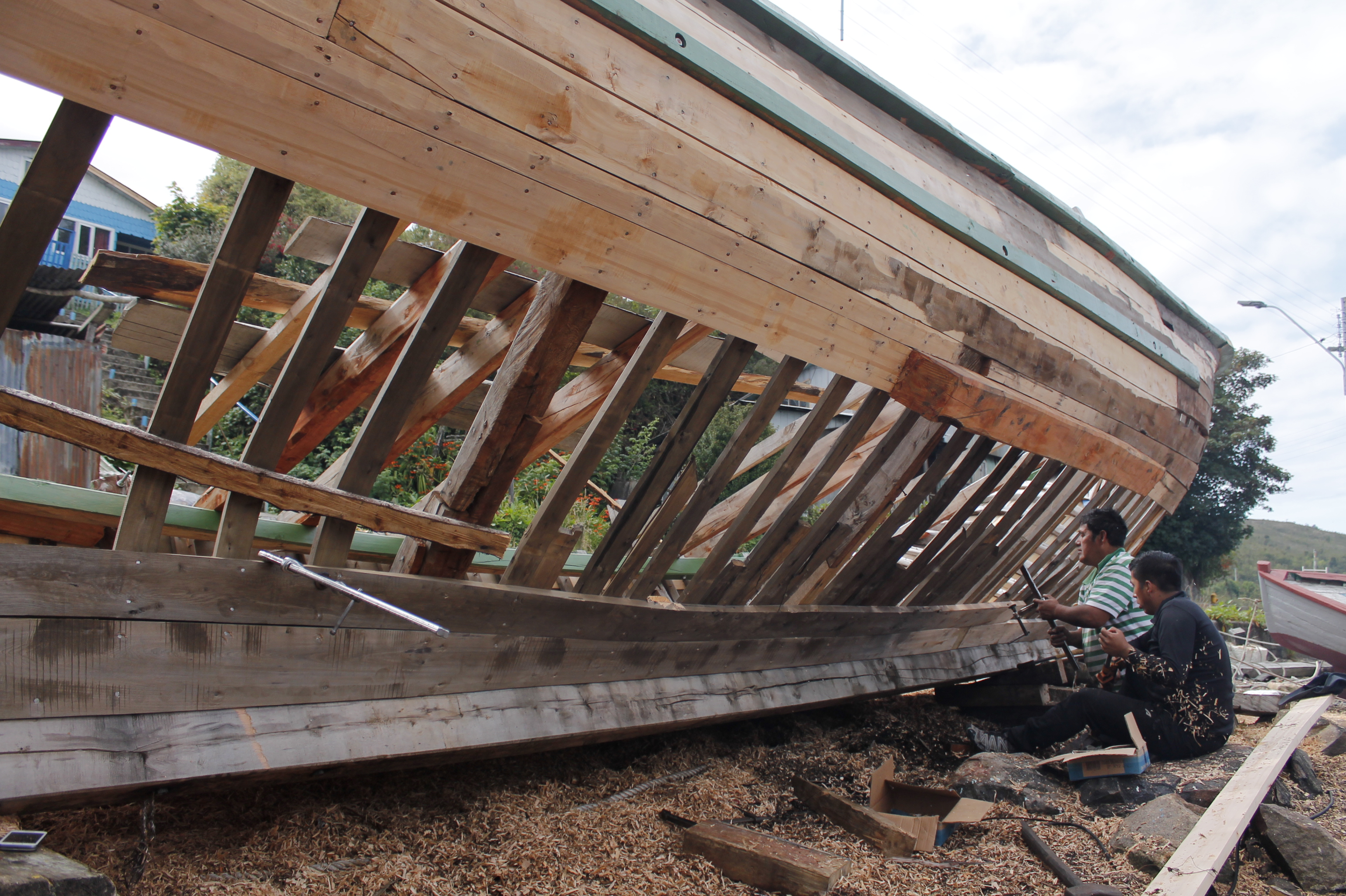
Local carpenter Octavio Chiguay building a boat in Melinka.

The main settlement in the archipelago is Melinka on Ascención Island, with 1,411 inhabitants as of 2002. As of 2017 the archipelago had a population of 1,843 inhabitants, a rise of almost 20 percent since the 2002 census. Since 2016, the settlements of Melinka and Repollal have electricity 24 hours per day. Much of the population of Guaitecas Archipelago is of Chilote-Huilliche background.

Since the 1980s, the extraction of sea urchins and locos have featured prominently in the economy. In 1985 the discovery of merluza fishing grounds in Moraleda Channel sparkled a fishing boom. This boom had greater impact on more eastwards locations and in Guaitecas Archipelago the inhabitants continued to focus on benthic resources, a tradition shared with Chiloé Archipelago. In the 1990s, salmon aquaculture became an important economic activity leading to leading salmon aquaculture companies to establish facilities in Melinka using the town as operative base.

=== Tourism ===
On February 3 and 4, a "feria costumbrista" is held at Repollal Alto in Ascención Island.

Fishermen in Melinka offer combined tours of bird watching and whale watching through the archipelago.
