= Natri Lake =

Lake in Chile

- Location within Chile
- Coordinates: 42°47′39.65″S 73°48′52.10″W
- Catchment area: 46.5 km^{2} (18.0 sq mi)
- Basin countries: Chile
- Max. length: 6.3 km (3.9 mi)
- Max. width: 1.3 km (0.81 mi)
- Min. width: 0.6 km (0.37 mi)
- Surface area: 7.8 km^{2} (3.0 sq mi)
- Average depth: 35 m (115 ft)
- Max. depth: 58 m (190 ft)
- Water volume: 0.273 km^{3} (0.065 cu mi)
- Shore length^{1}: 16.4 km (10.2 mi)
- Surface elevation: 39 m (128 ft)
- ^{1} Shore length is not a well-defined measure.

Natri Lake (Spanish: Lago Natri) is a lake in south-central Chiloé Island, Chile. It has an area of 7.8 square kilometres (3.0 sq mi). The lake's catchment basin is mostly made up of hilly terrain that is covered by native forest, and to a lesser extent natural prairies.

Chile Route 5 passes next to the lake's eastern end.
