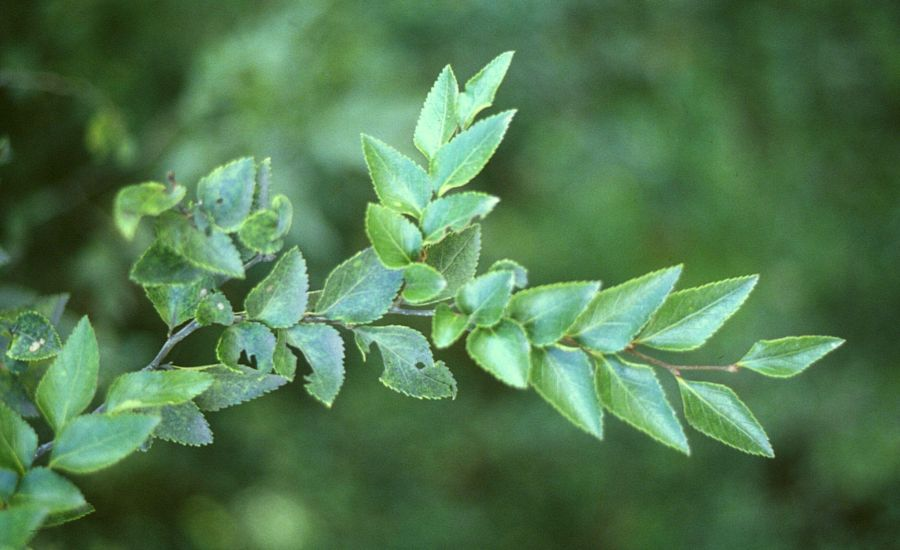
- Leaves, near Pargua, Chile

Conservation status
- Least Concern (IUCN 3.1)

Scientific classification
- Kingdom: Plantae
- Clade: Embryophytes
- Clade: Tracheophytes
- Clade: Spermatophytes
- Clade: Angiosperms
- Clade: Eudicots
- Clade: Rosids
- Order: Fagales
- Family: Nothofagaceae
- Genus: Nothofagus
- Subgenus: Nothofagus subg. Nothofagus
- Species: N. nitida

Binomial name
- Nothofagus nitida (Phil.) Krasser

Synonyms
- Fagus nitida

= Nothofagus nitida =

Species of tree

Nothofagus nitida (Chiloé's coigue) is an evergreen tree, native to southern Chile and Argentina. It is found from latitude 40° S to Última Esperanza (53° S).

== Description ==
Up to 35 m (115 ft) height and 2 m (6.5 ft) diameter. The bark is gray. It prefers very wet soils.

Leaves are alternate between 1.5 and 3 cm, they are hard, glossy green, with a small petiole and lanceolate shape. The new borne twigs have little hairs.

Male flowers have a unique verticil with 6–10 stamens and are surrounded by tepals (sepals and petals just the same). Female flowers are grouped five by five, and pollination is mainly anemophilous. The flowers are homochlamyd, small (3 to 5 mm), unisexual, arranged in inflorescences.

Its fruits are small, flattened or triangular, yellowish in cupules made up by 2 to 7 units.

== Uses ==
The wood is white-yellowish colored. It has beautiful engraving and it is used in furniture and construction.
