= Guaitecas =

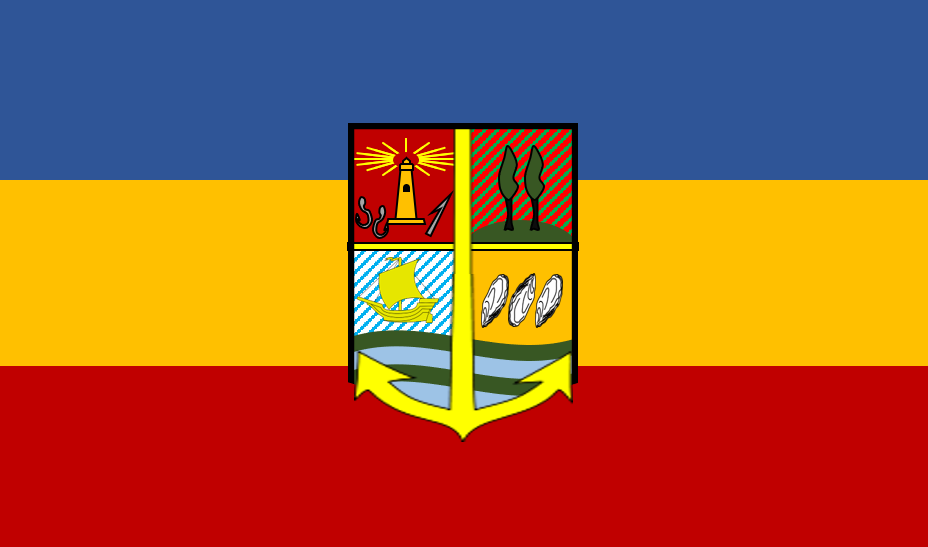
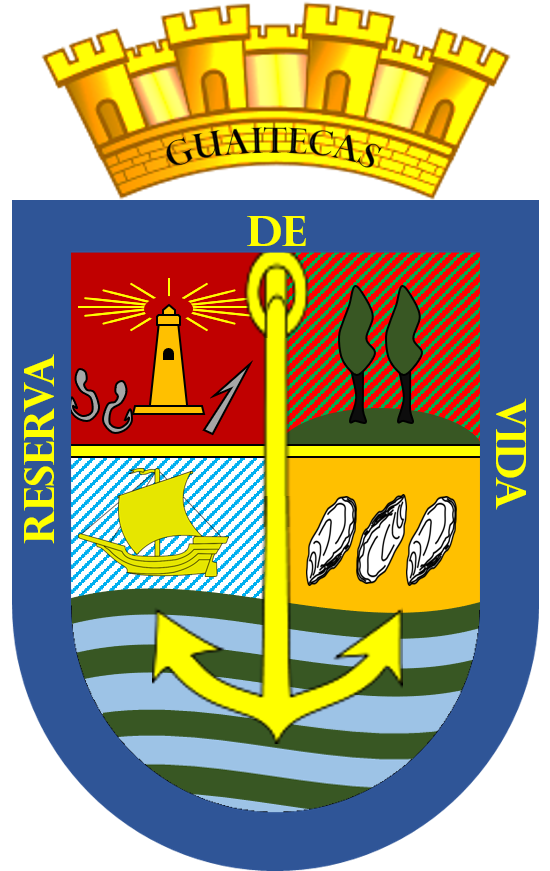
- Flag Coat of arms Location of the Commune of Guaitecas in Aysén del General Carlos Ibáñez del Campo Region Location in Chile
- Coordinates (commune): 43°53′S 73°45′W
- Country: Chile
- Region: Aysén
- Province: Aysén

Government
  - Type: Municipality
  - Alcalde: Marcos Silva Miranda (PPD)

Area
  - Total: 787.0 km^{2} (303.9 sq mi)
- Elevation: 72 m (236 ft)

Population (2012 Census)
  - Total: 1,473
  - Density: 1.872/km^{2} (4.848/sq mi)
  - Urban: 1,411
  - Rural: 128

Sex
  - Men: 913
  - Women: 626
- Area code: 56 + 67
- Website: Municipality of Guaitecas

Guaitecas is Chilean commune located in Guaitecas Archipelago which are part of Aysén Province and Region. The administrative centre is Melinka, the only port and town in the wider Chonos Archipelago.

== Demographics ==
Historical population
Year	Pop.	±% p.a.
1970	1,103	—
1982	1,107	+0.03%
1992	1,283	+1.49%
2002	1,539	+1.84%
2017	1,843	+1.21%
2024	1,598	−2.02%
Source: "Censo de Población y Vivienda". National Statistics Institute.

According to the 2002 census of the National Statistics Institute, Guaitecas spans an area of 787 km^{2} (304 sq mi) and has 1,539 inhabitants (913 men and 626 women). Of these, 1,411 (91.7%) lived in urban areas and 128 (8.3%) in rural areas. The population grew by 20% (256 persons) between the 1992 and 2002 censuses. Much of the population of Guaitecas is of Chilote-Huilliche background.

== Administration ==
As a commune, Guaitecas is a third-level administrative division of Chile administered by a municipal council, headed by an alcalde (Mayor) who is directly elected every four years. In December 2018 Cristián Alvarado Oyarzo (RN) who was then the mayor was preventively detained as part of an investigation where he was accused of a fraud against the state (Spanish: fraude al fisco) for at least 340 million pesos. This led to his deposition as mayor and his replacement by municipal councillor Marcos Silva Miranda (PPD), who afterwards won the 2021 municipal elections, being ratified as mayor. In December 2021 Cristián Alvarado was condemned to 10 years of prison and two of his collaborators to seven years of prison each.

Within the electoral divisions of Chile, Guaitecas is represented in the Chamber of Deputies by René Alinco Bustos (Ind-PPD), Miguel Ángel Calisto Águila (PDC) and Aracely Leuquén Uribe (RN), as part of the 27th electoral district, which includes the entire Aysén del General Carlos Ibáñez del Campo Region. The commune is represented in the Senate by Ximena Órdenes (PPD) and David Sandoval (UDI), as part of the 14th senatorial constituency, identical to the 27th district.
