= James Island (Chile) =

Island in the Chonos Archipelago, Chile

Native name: Isla Jaime
- Location within Chile

Geography
- Coordinates: 44.95°S 74.07°W
- Adjacent to: Pacific Ocean

Administration
- Chile
- Region: Aisén

Additional information
- NGA UFI=-885226

James Island (Chile) (Spanish Isla James) is an island in the Chonos Archipelago of Chile. It has an area of 388 square kilometres (150 sq mi).

== See also ==
- List of islands of Chile
