= Melchor Island =

Island in Chile

Native name: Isla Melchor
- Location within Chile

Geography
- Coordinates: 45°08′S 73°57′W
- Adjacent to: Pacific Ocean
- Area: 863.5 km^{2} (333.4 sq mi)
- Coastline: 241.9 km (150.31 mi)

Administration
- Chile
- Region: Aisén

Additional information
- NGA UFI=-892188

Melchor Island (Spanish Isla Melchor also known as Meleguen in the NGA) is an island in the Chonos Archipelago of Chile.

== See also ==
- List of islands of Chile
