= Chonos Archipelago =

Islands on the southwestern coast of Chile

Native name: Archipiélago de Chonos
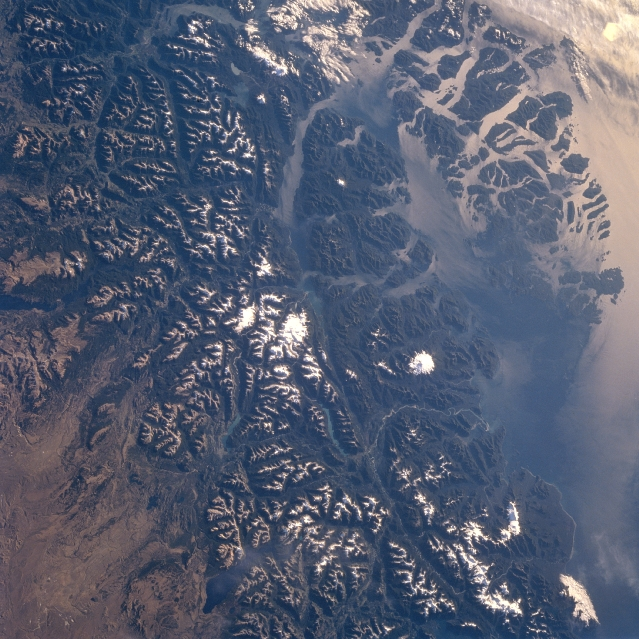
- Chonos Archipelago can be seen in the upper right portion of the image.

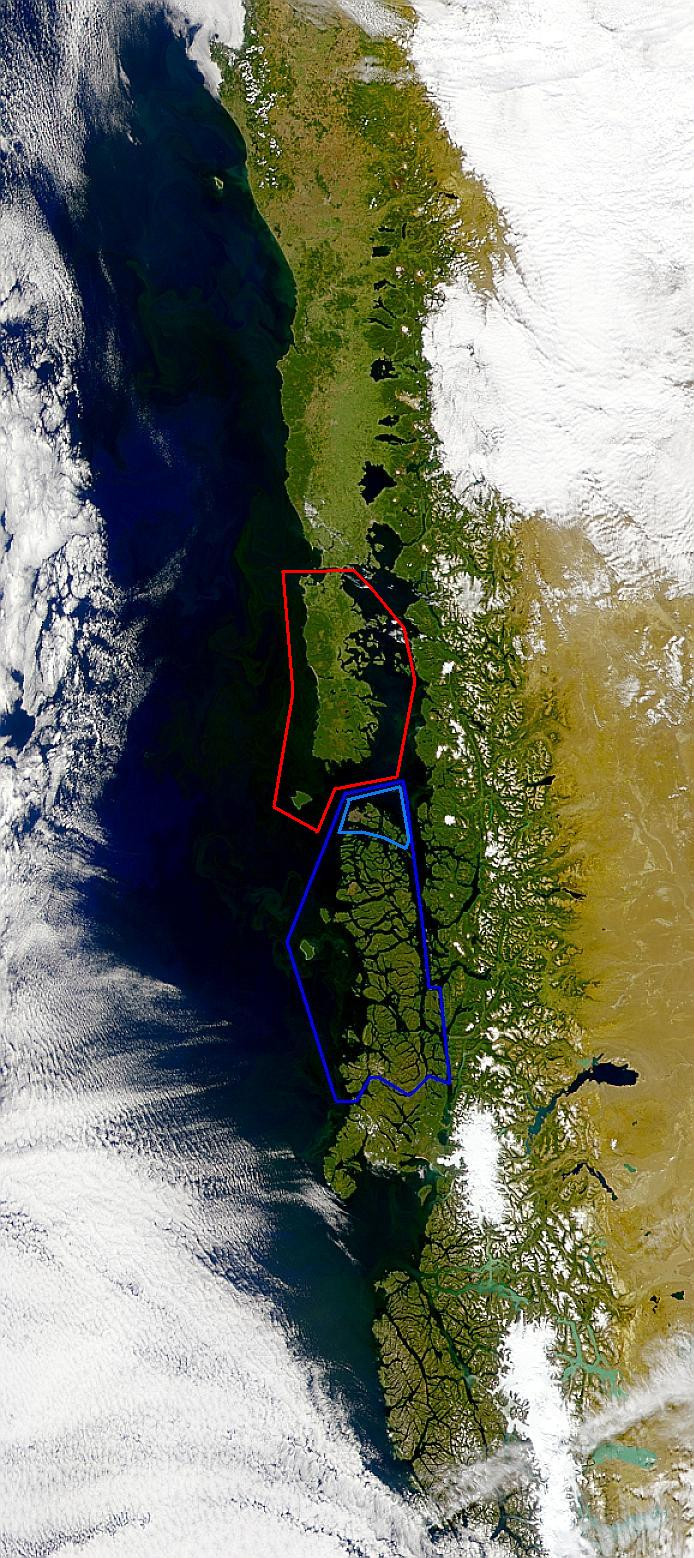
- Chonos Archipelago is marked with dark blue, Guaitecas Archipelago with light blue and Chiloé Archipelago is marked with red

Geography
- Coordinates: 45.1333°S 73.95°W
- Adjacent to: Pacific Ocean

Administration
- Chile
- Region: Aisén

Additional information
- NGA UFI=-877176

The Chonos Archipelago is a series of low, mountainous, elongated islands with deep bays, traces of a submerged Chilean Coast Range. Most of the islands are forested with little or no human settlement. The deep Moraleda Channel separates the islands of the Chonos Archipelago from the mainland of Chile and from Magdalena Island.

== Geography ==
The largest islands are Melchor Island, Benjamin Island, Traiguén Island, Riveros Island, Cuptana Island, James Island, Victoria Island, Simpson Island, Level Island, Luz Island.

Far out in the Pacific is Guamblin Island with the Isla Guamblin National Park. The National park comprises about 106 square kilometres (41 sq mi). Blue whales can often be seen here.

Some groups of islands are grouped into minor archipelagoes such as the Guaitecas Archipelago. The Guaitecas Archipelago has its own municipality and possesses the only settlement in the archipelago, Melinka. All islands are part of the Aisén Region.

== History ==
Chonos Archipelago was mapped in the 18th and 19th centuries by José de Moraleda y Montero (1793), Robert FitzRoy (1834) and Enrique Simpson (1870–71).

== Flora ==
Most of the archipelago is covered by a more-less open Pilgerodendron forest with cushion plants such as Astelia pumila, Donatia fascicularis and Oreobolus obtusangulus. In the western fringes of the archipelago a shrubland of c. 2 meter high Pilgerondendron and Nothofagus nitida grows. Amidst this shrubland, occasional peatlands and forests exist.

== See also ==
- List of islands of Chile
