= Aysén Province =

Aysén Province Provincia de Aysén
- Province
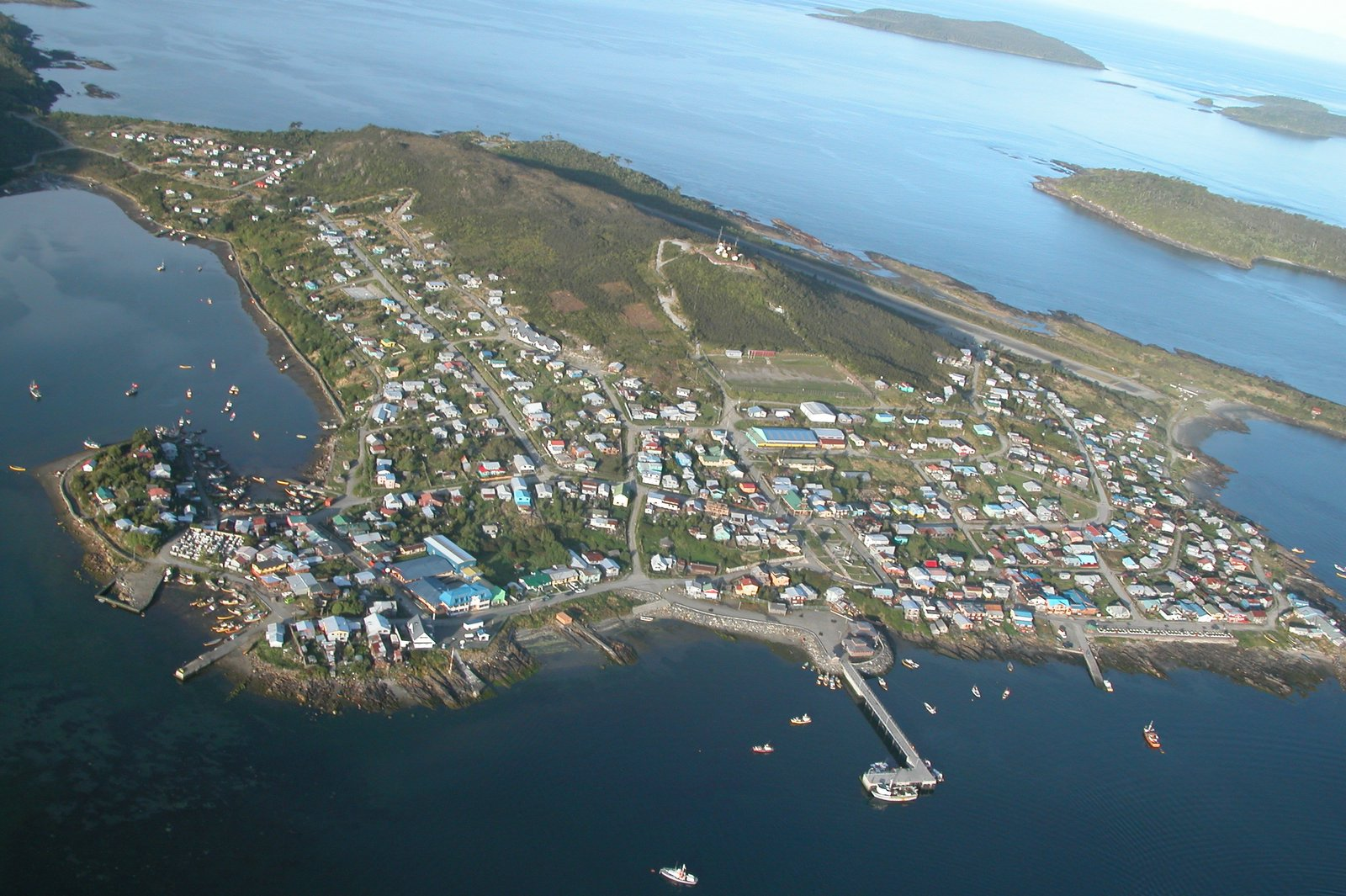
- Melinka, a town in the province

- Seal

- Location in the Aysén del General Carlos Ibáñez del Campo Region

- Location in Chile
- Coordinates: 44°55′S 73°35′W
- Country: Chile
- Region: Aysén
- Capital: Puerto Aysén
- Communes: Aisén; Cisnes; Guaitecas

Government
  - Type: Provincial

Area
  - Total: 46,588.8 km^{2} (17,988.0 sq mi)

Population (2024)
  - Total: 29,905
  - Density: 0.64189/km^{2} (1.6625/sq mi)
- Time zone: UTC−4 (CLT)
  - Summer (DST): UTC-3 (CLST)
- Area code: country 56 + area 67
- ISO 3166 code: CL-AI
- Website: Government of Aysén

Aysén Province (Spanish: Provincia de Aysén) is a province in the Aysén Region of Chile. Its capital is Puerto Aysén. Spread over an area of 46,588.8 km^{2} (17,988.0 sq mi), it had a population of 29,905 inhabitants as per the 2024 Chilean census.

== History ==
In 1520, the region was discovered by Spanish explorer Ferdinand Magellan, who named it as "Tierras de Diciembre" (Land of December). In the 19th century, migrants from Argentina and Germany, settled in the region, and engaged in agriculture, fishing and logging. In the 20th century, the Government of Chile gave land grants to encourage settlement in the region, and the city of Puerto Aysen was established in 1913.

The Aysén Region was established on 10 July 1974, as per Law No. 575, which reorganised Chile into thirteen regions. It was named is divided into four provinces–Aysén, Coyhaique, General Carrera and Capitán Prat, which are further divided into ten communes.

== Geography ==
Aysén Province is one of the four provinces of the Aysén Region in Chile. It spans an area of 46,588.8 km^{2} (17,988.0 sq mi). The province is situated in the Chilean Patagonia. Puerto Aysén, located on the banks of the Aysén River, serves as the capital of the province. Majority of the land area is occupies by coastal plains along the Aysen and Baker rivers. About 20% of the land area forms part of the Guaitecas Archipelago. The province consists of various fjords, mountains, and eroded river valleys.

=== Climate ===
The province has a maritime climate with average annual temperature of 9.36 °C (48.85 °F). The region receives only about 3.4 cm (1.3 in) rainfall on average annually.

== Administration ==
Coyhaique is a second-level administrative division of Chile, governed by a governor. It is further sub-divided into the communes (comunas) of Aisén, Cisnes, and Guaitecas.

Commune	Area (km^{2})	2002 Population	Density (km^{2})	Website
Guaitecas	787.0	1,539	2.0	link
Cisnes	15,831.4	5,739	0.4	link
Aisén	29,970.4	22,353	0.7	link

== Demographics ==
According to the 2024 Chilean census, the province had a population of 29,905 inhabitants. The population consisted of 14,977 males (50.1%) and 14,928 females (49.9%). About 19.0% of the population was below the age of 15 years, 69.2% belonged to the age group of 15–64 years, and 11.7% was aged 65 years or older. The province had an urban population of 24,926 inhabitants (83.4%) and a rural population of 4,979 inhabitants (16.6%). Most of the residents were born in Chile, accounting for 28,984 inhabitants (96.9%). Non-indigenous people formed the majority of the population with 19,132 inhabitants (64%), while 10,767 inhabitants (36%) identified themselves as belonging to indigenous groups. Roman Catholics formed the largest religious group with 13,160 adherents (54.6%), followed by 6,540 inhabitants (27.1%) indicating no religious affiliation, and Evangelicals or Protestants with 3,769 adherents (15.6%).
