= Chilean colonization of the Strait of Magellan =

Location of Chilean settlements established in the 1840s

The Chilean colonization of the Strait of Magellan began in 1843 when an expedition founded Fuerte Bulnes. In 1848 the settlement of Punta Arenas was established further north in the strait and grew eventually to become the main settlement in the strait, a position it holds to this day. The Chilean settlement of the strait was crucial to establish its sovereignty claims in the area. Argentina complained diplomatically this act in 1847, as part of the East Patagonia, Tierra del Fuego and Strait of Magellan Dispute, and once the dispute was settled, formally recognised Chilean sovereignty of the strait in 1881. The Magallanes territory was made a regular Chilean province in 1928.

== Background ==
In the 1540s and 1550s several maritime and land expeditions into the strait were launched from the Spanish bases in Chile. Southward expansion by Spanish conquistadores in Chile halted after the conquest of the Chiloé Archipelago in 1567. The Spanish are thought to have lacked incentives for further conquests south; the indigenous populations were sparse and did not engage in the sedentary agricultural life of the Spanish. In the 1580s there was a major attempt to settle and fortify the strait organized in metropolitan Spain. The venture ended in failure with settlers dying or fleeing the strait. The last known survivor was rescued by a passing ship in 1590. Proposals to settle the strait were raised again in Spanish courts in 1671 in connection to John Narborough's expedition to Chile. In 1676 a rumour reached the Spanish court claiming that England was preparing an expedition to settle the Strait of Magellan. This was not the first rumour of a foreign settlement in Patagonia to reach the Spanish. A proposal to settle the strait was raised yet again in 1702 by the Governor of Chile Francisco Ibáñez de Peralta. In this last proposal, the Captaincy General of Chile would itself finance the settlement with the Real Situado with the sole condition that these payments begin to arrive on time. However the Spanish failure to settle the Strait of Magellan in the 1580s was so notorious that its precedent ruled out any attempt to settle the strait for centuries to come. At the start of the 19th century knowledge of the conditions of the strait in Chile was almost nonexistent and if anything, it was thought of as an "uninhabitable wilderness".

=== French and British interest in the strait ===
In Chile, there were suspicions that the British or French would attempt to settle the strait. The 1837 French expedition of Dumont D'Urville surveyed the area of Puerto del Hambre and the navigational conditions in the Strait of Magellan. In a report the expedition recommended that a French colony be established at the strait to support future traffic along the route. Chilean authorities were aware of the French interest in the strait but had no detailed information about French designs for the area. Chile never made any public complaint to France.

Chilean officials also suspected the British of being interested in establishing a base in the strait. This suspicion was based in on the first (1826–1830) and second (1831–1836) voyage of HMS Beagle and the reports originating from them. In the opinion of Robert FitzRoy a British base in strait would be beneficial for the contact of the British Isles with Australia.

== Ancud expedition ==
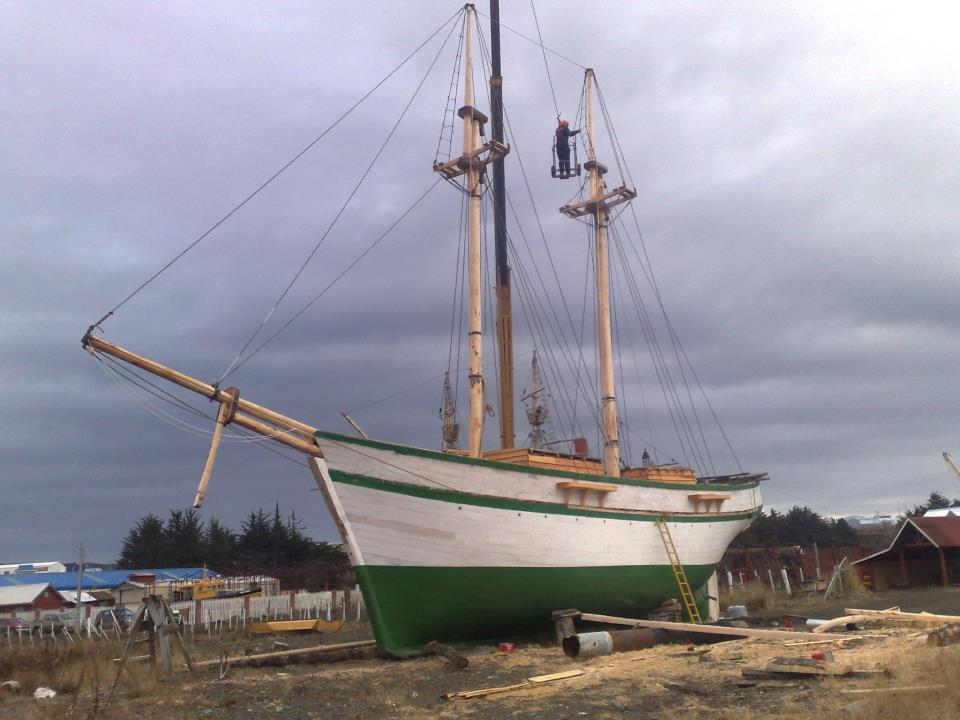
Replica of the schooner Ancud used to established a permanent Chilean presence in the strait in 1843

While in exile in Peru Bernardo O'Higgins, independent Chile's head of state from 1817 to 1823, promoted the colonization of the strait in his correspondence with authorities. Chile's decision to send an expedition to the strait appears to be unrelated to O'Higgin's suggestions and was more of a direct response to an American citizen's request to be allowed to establish a tug boat service for steamships in the strait. Chilean authorities were supportive of the idea but sought first to establish a permanent Chilean outpost in the strait. As no ship of the Chilean Navy was available for the expedition the schooner Ancud was built in Chiloé for the purpose. In Chiloé Prussian naturalist Bernhard Eunom Philippi learned about the expedition and was granted permission by the Chilean government to join it.

=== Repairs and incident at Puerto Americano ===
On its first attempt to reach the strait in the winter of 1843 Ancud was badly battered by storms reaching Puerto Americano in the fjords and channels of Patagonia on June 6. Puerto Americano was a sheltered cove where the Yates cousins (Note: John and Henry Yates, the Yates cousins, were two English sea-farers who had been stranded at a young age in the fjords and channels of Patagonia when the ship they travelled caught fire. Subsequently, they decided to settle mingling with indigenous Chonos and Huilliches. John Yates was a relative of the wife of John Williams Wilson.) had established a trading post. Being a friend of the cousins Chilean-British commander John Williams Wilson had directed Ancud there as a first stopover. The expeditionaries spent one month repairing Ancud and exploring the nearby area in a small boat they built on place. The Yates cousins provided the men with lodge, dry sea lion meat and dry firewood. On August 4, two weeks after the repaired Ancud had departed for the strait, she was back in port, yet again needing repairs. When entering Puerto Americano a second time the expeditionaries found that Enterprise had arrived to trade with the Yates cousins. Deeming Enterprise to be engaging in tobacco contraband with the Yates cousins Williams demanded it to leave by September 5. By one account his mean went as far as boarding Enterprise to force her to leave. Enterprise, being a larger ship was well defended against any eviction attempt and refused to follow William's demands. Williams did threaten to report it to Chilean authorities in Chiloé if he found it again. Later Chilean authorities sanctioned the Yates cousins forcing them to provide sea lion meat and dry shellfish free of charge to Chilean supply ships sailing to or from the strait of Magellan.

William's men borrowed and repaired the cousin's chalupa and used it to send men back to Chiloé to obtain repair material for Ancud. Once the Ancud was repaired a second time it sat sail for the strait again.

=== Ancud in the Strait of Magellan ===
The whole crew of Ancud went ashore in the strait on September 21, 1843, and took formal possession of the strait raising the flag of Chile in a ceremony. A few days later the crew of a French ship went ashore near the Chileans promoting William's to complain about the use of the French flag on land. The French complied with the demand and stopped using the flag. After declaring possession the Ancud and its crew went on to explore the northern shore of the strait in search of a suitable site for establishing a permanent outpost. Reaching as far as Primera Angostura before having to return in face of bad weather, the expeditionaries had a friendly encounter with indigenous Tehuelche at Pecket Bay and discovered fragments of mineral coal on the beaches of Catalina Bay. A decision was made to establish the outpost at the port of San Felipe given its good harbour and abundance of wood, a resource that was scarce in sites further northeast. From October 12 to November 11 the expeditionaries built the fortress-settlement Fuerte Bulnes.

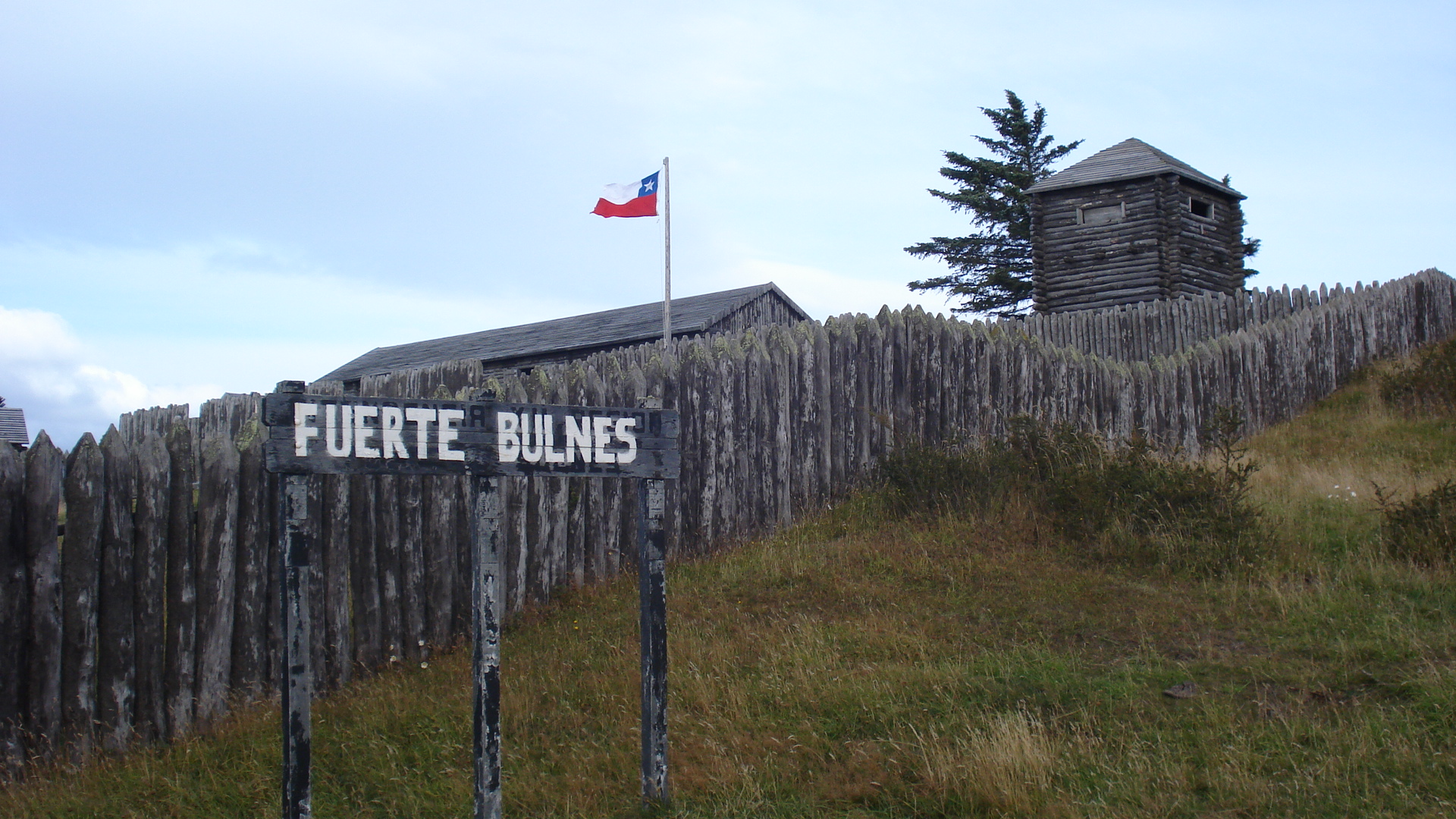
Modern view Fuerte Bulnes as reconstructed in the 1940s

The first garrison and settlers of Fuerte Bulnes was a contingent of eleven persons, eight of them soldiers, two women and a maritime pilot. Having named army officer Manuel González Hidalgo as the first governor Ancud left the nascent colony on November 13 to search for the source of the coal found on the beaches further north. The crew of Ancud failed to locate coal outcrops and sailed back to Fuerte Bulnes from where they sat sail to Chiloé on December 5. When leaving the sheltered waters of the channels and entering the Gulf of Penas Ancud discovered the survivors of the wrecked French ship Fleuris whom they took on board. Unfavourable winds and the load the rescues added made progress north slower than usual. By arriving back to its point of origin in Ancud's namesake port on December 5 the expedition had come to an end.

== Penal colony (1843–1852) ==
Location of Fuerte Bulnes, 70 km south of Punta Arenas

The first resupply expedition, this time with Voladora, to Fuerte Bulnes departed in January 1844 from the port of Ancud. On board Voladora came Sergeant major Pedro Silva who had been appointed governor taking command of the colony from Manuel González Hidalgo. Soon, however, Silva became unpopular in the garrison for his harsh discipline. Governor Silva signed a treaty with local Tehuelche chief Santos Centurión where the latter recognised Chilean sovereignty. The treaty also declared that the Tehuelche would not be hindered to trade with the colony.

From 1845 onwards Ancud was stationed in Fuerte Bulnes contributing to the charting and exploration of the strait. The garrison of Fuerte Bulnes was relieved in late 1845 when new soldiers arrived. Sergeant major José de los Santos Mardones took command of Fuerte Bulnes as governor in 1847. The winter of 1847 was harsh and the settlement's livestock was moved north to the valley of río del Carbón (lit. "River of the Coal") which provided a sheltered area with good grazing grounds. The soils of the place were more appropriate for sowing crops than those around Fuerte Bulnes and the climate less constant winds. A small outpost was established there to take care of the livestock and protect the colony from eventual Tehuelche incursions. In March 1848 half of Fuerte Bulnes was destroyed in a fire. Mardones took the occasion to move much of the settlement to the site of the small outpost further north. This move led in effect to the establishment of the modern city of Punta Arenas. Convicts of the penal colony were left behind to care of Fuerte Bulnes. Punta Arenas developed rapidly, by mid-1849 it had reached or surpassed Fuerte Bulnes in population. Barter with ships allowed the settlers to be supplied with nails and tools necessary for the growing settlement. By October 1851 the population of Punta Arenas had grown to 436. In November of the same year the Mutiny of Cambiazo, an internal conflict involving Chilean soldiers and convicts, led to the ravaging and abandonment of the settlement. The abandoned settlement was further destroyed in January 1852 when Tehuelches sacked whatever of value that was left. To rebuild the settlement the Chilean government sent Bernhard Eunom Philippi as new governor. Philippi arrived in Punta Arenas on board of Infatigable on August 18, 1852.

== Territory of colonization ==
While the settlement's relations with Tehuelches had been amicable in early October 1852 Philippi was assassinated by Tehuelches during an inland trip with his assistant and his interpreter. After this Chile appointed a new governor and changed the status of the strait from penal colony to a "territory of colonization".

To stimulate settlement President José Joaquín Pérez issued a decree establishing that prospective settlers to the strait would have free tickets, a free plot of land and free education and healthcare for them and their sons and daughters. Responding to this 234 people embarked in Valparaíso and Ancud arriving to the strait in February 1868. Swiss settlers were granted small land plots south of Punta Arenas in 1868, but these immigrants resettled soon in río del Carbón where conditions were better for agriculture. The first foreign immigrants to settle in Punta Arenas proper did so in 1874. The most common nationalities of these early immigrants were Swiss, French, Spanish, German and Lithuanian. Early settlers made their living either by working in horticulture, engaging in small-scale gold mining in Brunswick Peninsula or going on expeditions to trade with Tehuelches in the north. A few others also engaged in the hunting of rheas and feral cattle. As measured in the export of rhea feathers and guanaco hides from Punta Arenas hunting and trade with Tehuelches appear to have peaked in the mid-1870s.

=== Economic boom (1876–1906) ===
Two major events that reshaped the economy and outlook of the colony occurred in the 1876–1884 period; these were a sheep farming boom and gold rush. In an attempt to promote the economic activity of the settlement governor Diego Dublé Almeyda travelled to the Falkland Islands aboard Chacabuco in 1876 bringing back sheep that were transferred to pioneer farmers. With these sheep Englishman Henry Reynard (Spanish: Enrique Reynard) made the first successful attempt at mass sheep farming in the Straits of Magellan in 1877 on Isabel Island. With this experience in being known all the best sheep-herding areas along the Strait had been leased or reserved by 1884. The leases were given on a 20-year basis. When the 20-years leases expired new auctions were held in 1903−1906 leading to further concentration of land ownership by a few large companies. The concentration of land ownership around the strait was denounced in various works in the late 19th and early 20th-century. Among the criticisms was that such distribution hindered the establishment of independent farmers in the area.

In 1879 navy officer Ramón Serrano Montaner discovered gold in Sierra Boqueron across the strait in Tierra del Fuego. In the following years gold mining campments were set up in the area by pioneers. A proper gold rush around the strait started in 1884 and ended in the 1900s contributing to the economic growth of Punta Arenas.

In November 1877 a mutiny broke out in Punta Arenas, ending in the murder of numerous civilians.

=== Post-boom era (1906–1928) ===
In the 1910s the economy of Magallanes faced several challenges such as the decline in sea traffic as a result of the opening of Panama Canal in 1914 and the establishing of customs in Punta Arenas.

The territory of Magallanes was made a regular Chilean province in 1928.

== Argentine claim ==
The strait was also claimed by Argentina. Asperities were for a while subdued by the 1856 Argentina–Chile treaty. However, in the 1860s Argentina recruited local Tehuelche chief Casimiro Biguá in a bid to counter Chilean influence and establish an Argentine settlement in the strait. Biguá was declared lieutenant colonel of the Argentine Army and granted a salary accordingly. He was promised modern weaponry for him and his men. In July 1866 Biguá signed a treaty with Argentine authorities declaring Tehuelches Argentine nationals and "recognizing Argentine sovereignty up to the strait". The wider scheme considered the establishment of an Argentine outpost in San Gregorio Bay in the eastern part of strait. Argentines did eventually arrive by sea to San Gregorio Bay in the mid-1860s, but did so without the supplies needed to establish a settlement. In a renewed attempt in 1869 Argentines built a hut thought to serve as an Argentine–Tehuelche trading post in the San Gregorio Bay. This attempt was thwarted by Chilean governor Óscar Viel y Toro who oversaw the dismantling of the structure.

With the Boundary Treaty of 1881 Argentina accepted Chilean sovereignty over the strait, not before having Chile accept Argentine rule over eastern Tierra del Fuego Island. During the negotiations Argentina also attempted to establish a prohibition against fortifications in the strait. The final text established however only a prohibition against fortifications that may hinder free navigation in the strait. During negotiations there was also a Chilean proposal to give Argentina part of easternmost northern shore of the strait to Argentina in exchange for Chile keeping all of Tierra del Fuego.

== Sources ==
- Braun Menéndez, Armando (1972) [1934]. El Motin de los Artilleros (in Spanish) (2nd ed.). Buenos Aires: Editorial Francisco de Aguirre.
- Harambour Ross, Alberto (2019). Soberanías Fronterizas. Estados y capital en la colonización de Patagonia (Argentina y Chile, 1830-1922). Valdivia: Ediciones de la Universidad Austral de Chile.
- Martinic, Mateo (1977). Historia del Estrecho de Magallanes (in Spanish). Santiago: Andrés Bello.
- Spate, Oskar Hermann Khristian (2004). The Spanish Lake. Volume 1 of Pacific since Magellan. ANU E Press. ISBN 9781920942168.
- Talbott, Robert D. (1974). A history of the Chilean boundaries (A Replica ed.). The Iowa State University Press. ISBN 0-8138-0305-5.
- Williams, Glyn (1975). The desert and the dream: A study of Welsh colonization in Chubut 1865 – 1915. Cardiff: University of Wales Press. ISBN 978-0-7083-0579-9.
