= Museo Nao Victoria =

Coordinates: 53.10768°S 70.879832°W

Museo Nao Victoria (Chile)
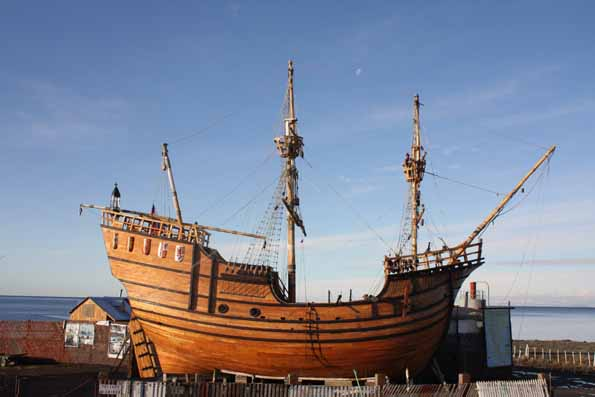
- Nao Victoria Replica in the museum
- Established: 2011
- Location: Punta Arenas, Chile
- Type: Maritime museum
- Website: https://www.registromuseoschile.cl/663/w3-article-83699.html

The Nao Victoria Museum is a private maritime museum located in Punta Arenas, Chile. It has been open to the public since 1 October 2011. The museum offers interactive displays featuring replicas of the ships that contributed to the discovery of the area, helped colonize the territory, or had a special and historic heritage significance for the Magallanes Region of Chile. The replicas were built using traditional shipbuilding techniques.

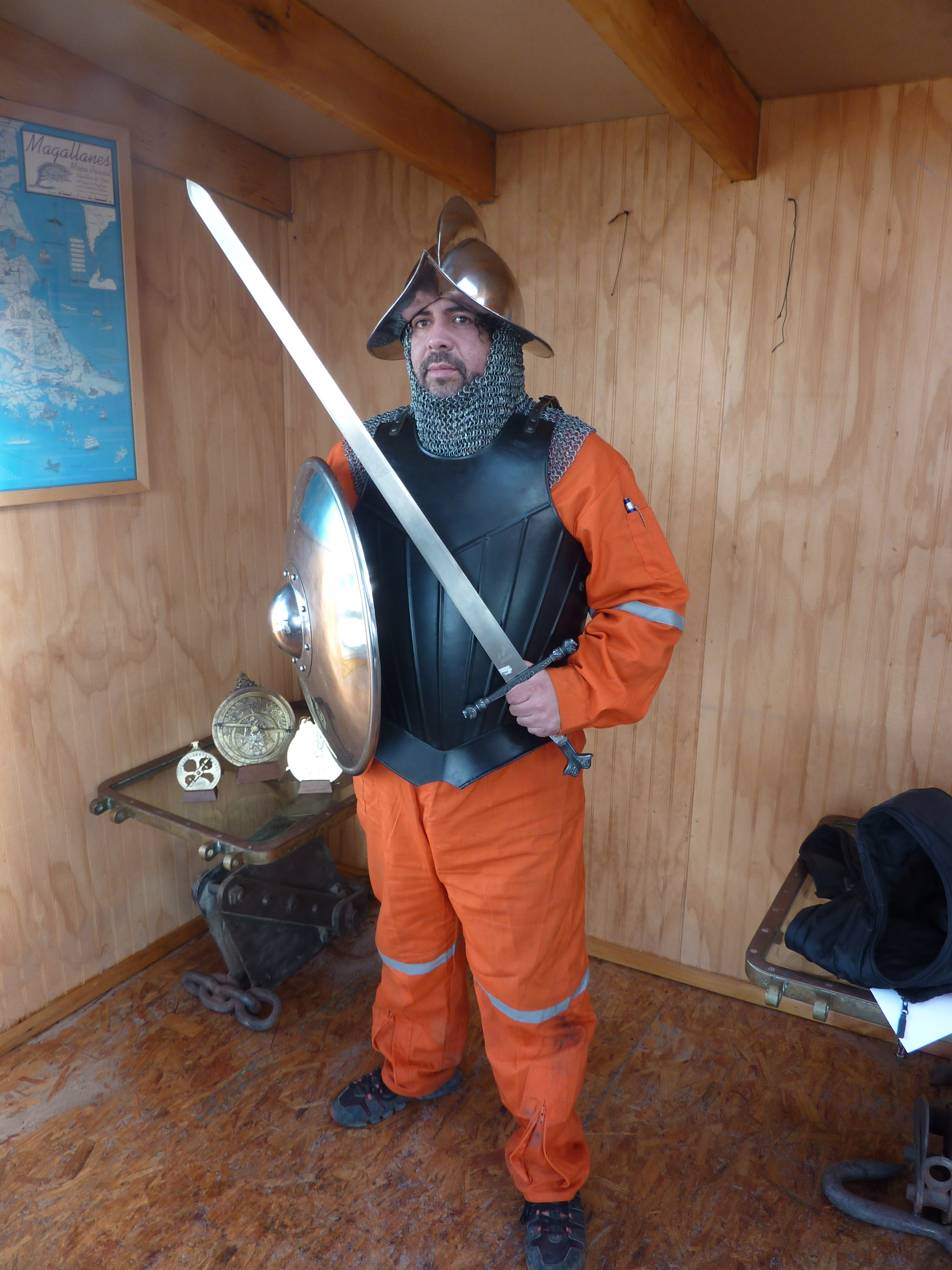
A visitor dressed as a Spanish conquistador, part of the interactive programs in the museum

== Collections ==
The main collection of the museum is the full-size replicas of historic ships on display along the Straits of Magellan. Replicas of weapons and ancient navigation tools are also exhibited, as well as copies of documents and books relating to the historic ships and an outdoor shipbuilding workshop.

=== Replicas ===
Today the museum has three ship replicas:

==== Nao Victoria ====
The Victoria was a nao (carrack) 27 metres (89 ft) long and 7 metres (23 ft) wide, part of the fleet commanded by Ferdinand Magellan that carried first Europeans to discover the waterway around southern tip of South America. Later, commanded by Juan Sebastian Elcano, she was the only ship of the five to complete the first-time circumnavigation of the globe. Commanded by Duarte Barbosa, the Victoria participated in the discovery by Europeans of Chile, being the first to explore the region, in 1520, and discovering or naming Patagonia, Cape Virgenes, the Straits of Magellan, Tierra del Fuego, the Pacific Ocean and other landmarks.

Nao Victoria
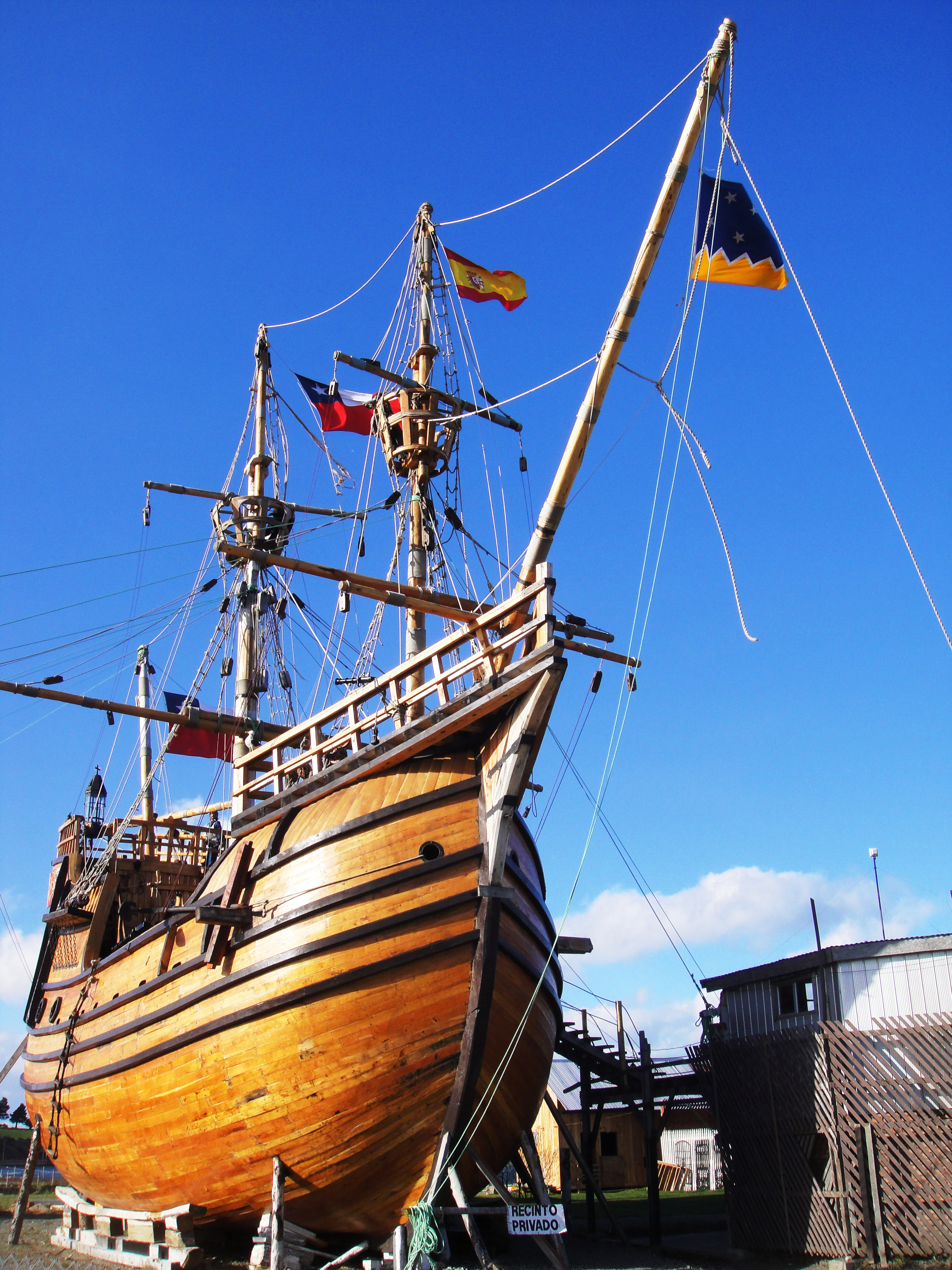
Replica of nao Victoria.

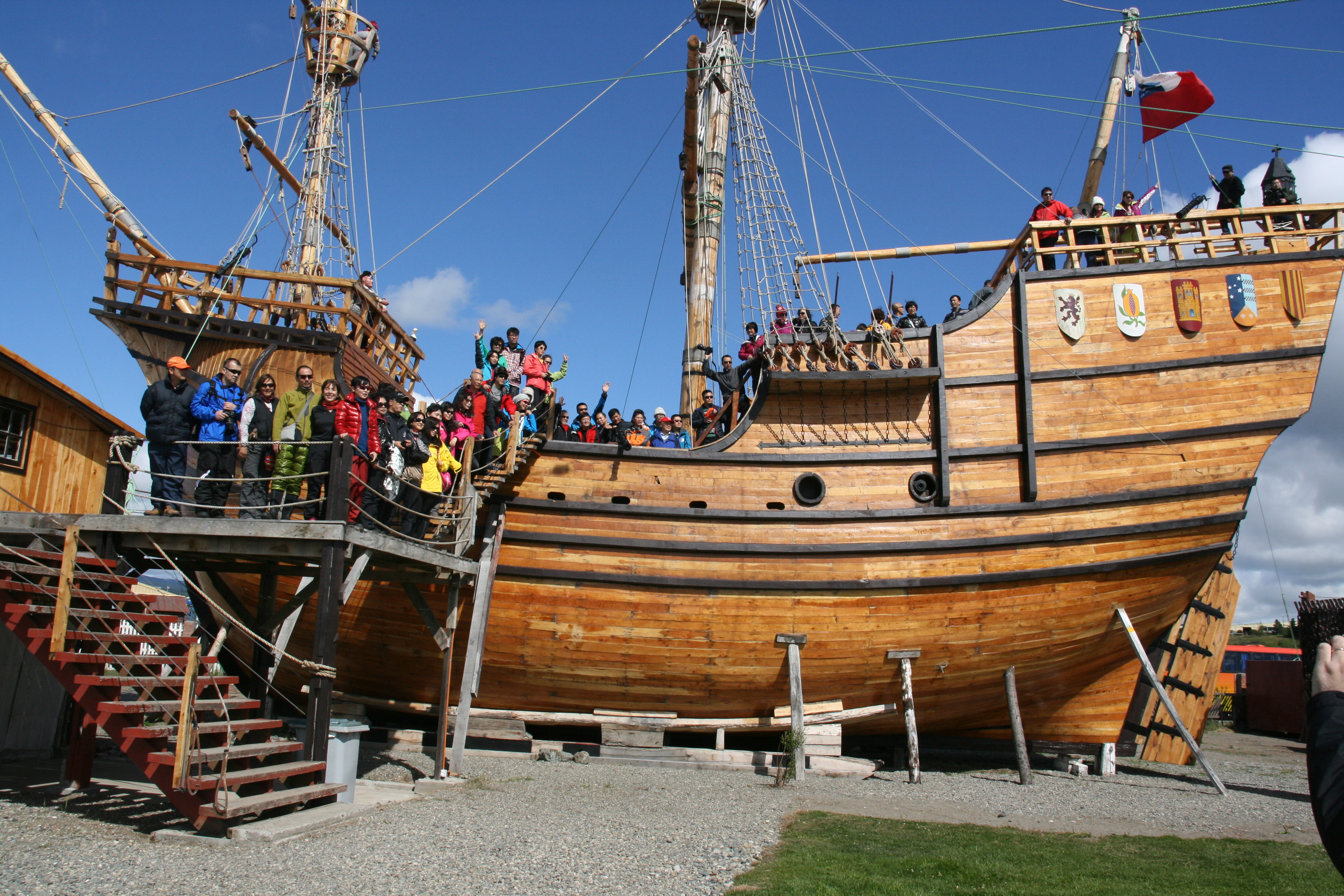
Replica of nao Victoria, tourists on board.

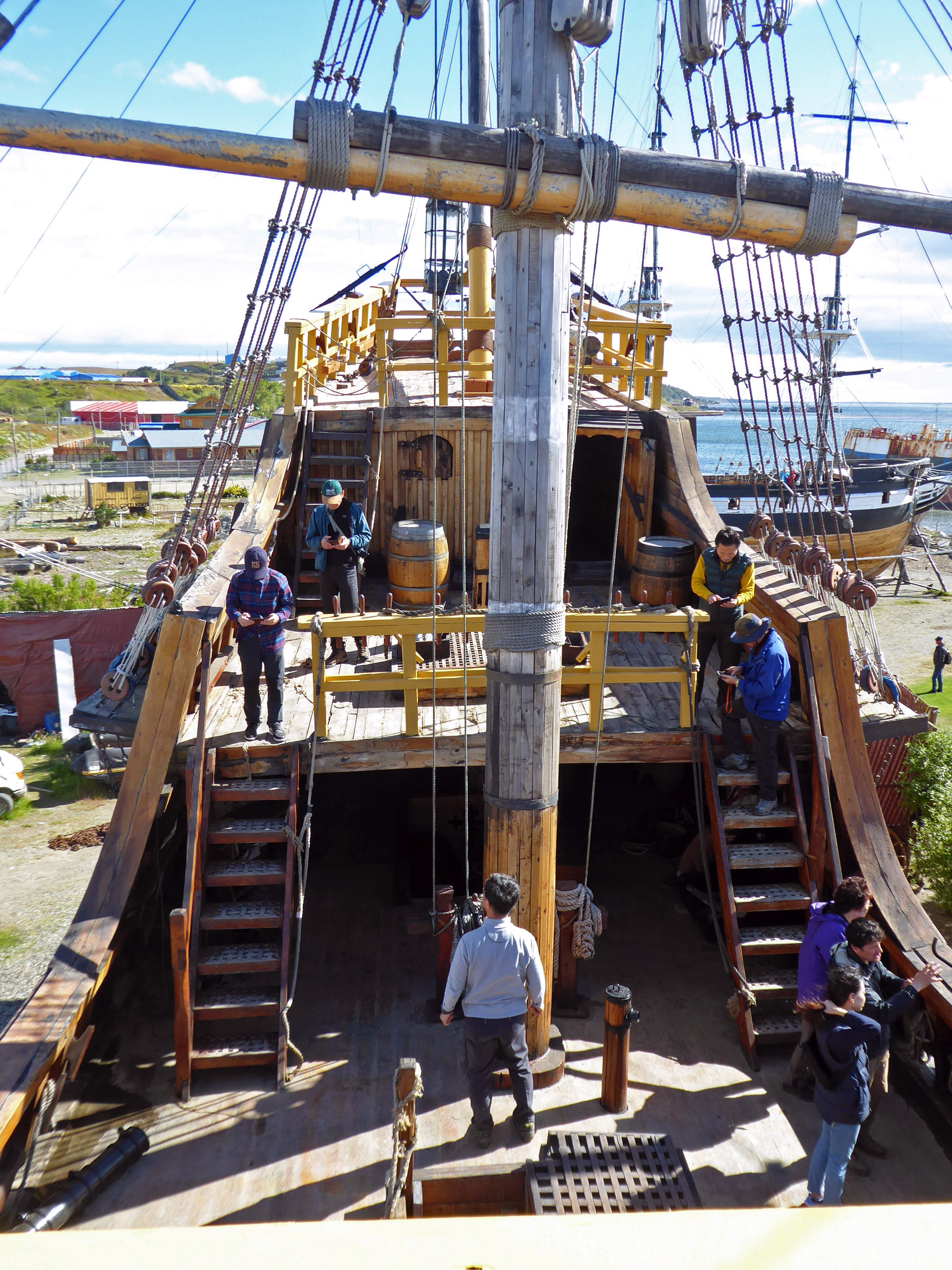
Aft decks of replica of nao Victoria.

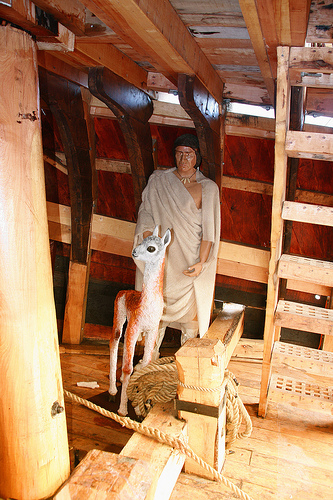
Replica of nao Victoria, Pablo, the first native American to be baptised in Chile.

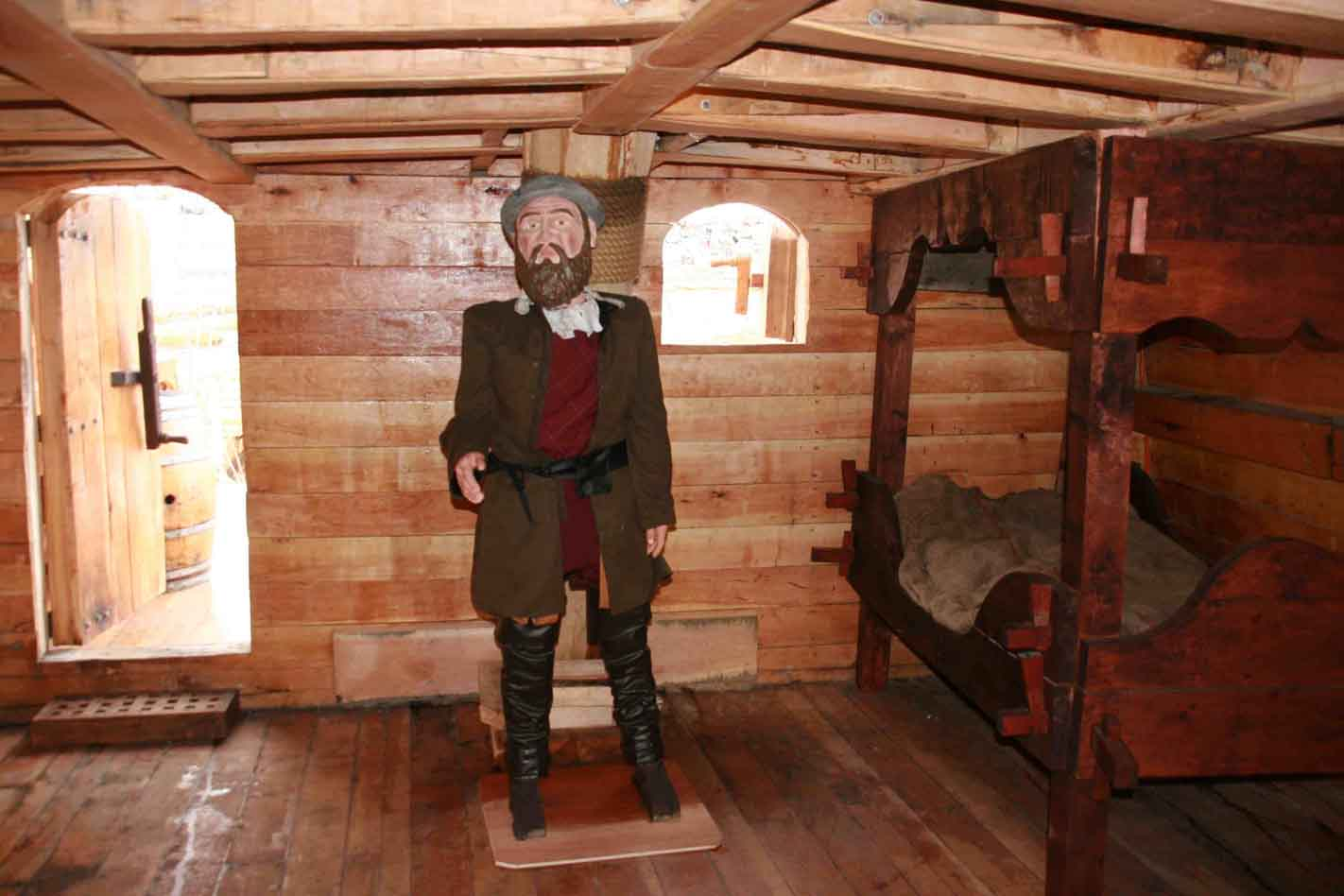
Replica of nao Victoria, Magellan in its cabin.

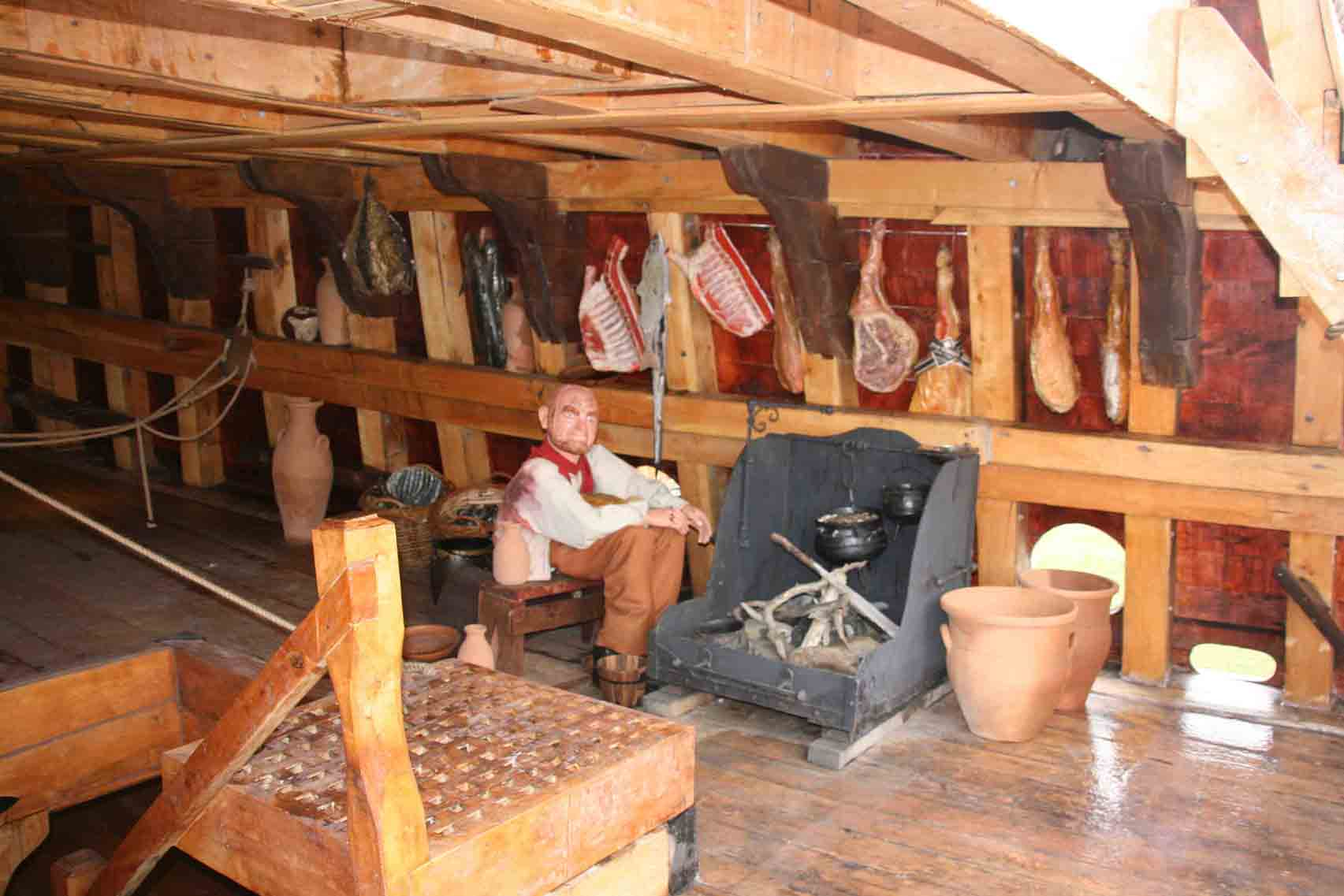
Replica of nao Victoria, cook at the stove.

==== James Caird ====
James Caird was a lifeboat of the Endurance, adapted by carpenter Harry McNish to sail from Elephant Island to South Georgia Island during Sir Ernest Shackleton's 1916 Imperial Trans-Antarctic Expedition. A party of six, including Shackleton and Frank Worsley, made their way for 17 days and 1,300 km (800 miles) across the notorious Drake Passage, battling gales and icing, with Worsley navigating based sextant readings of the seldom visible sun taken from the pitching boat. They succeeded in hitting South Georgia and obtained rescue for the stranded expedition.

James Caird
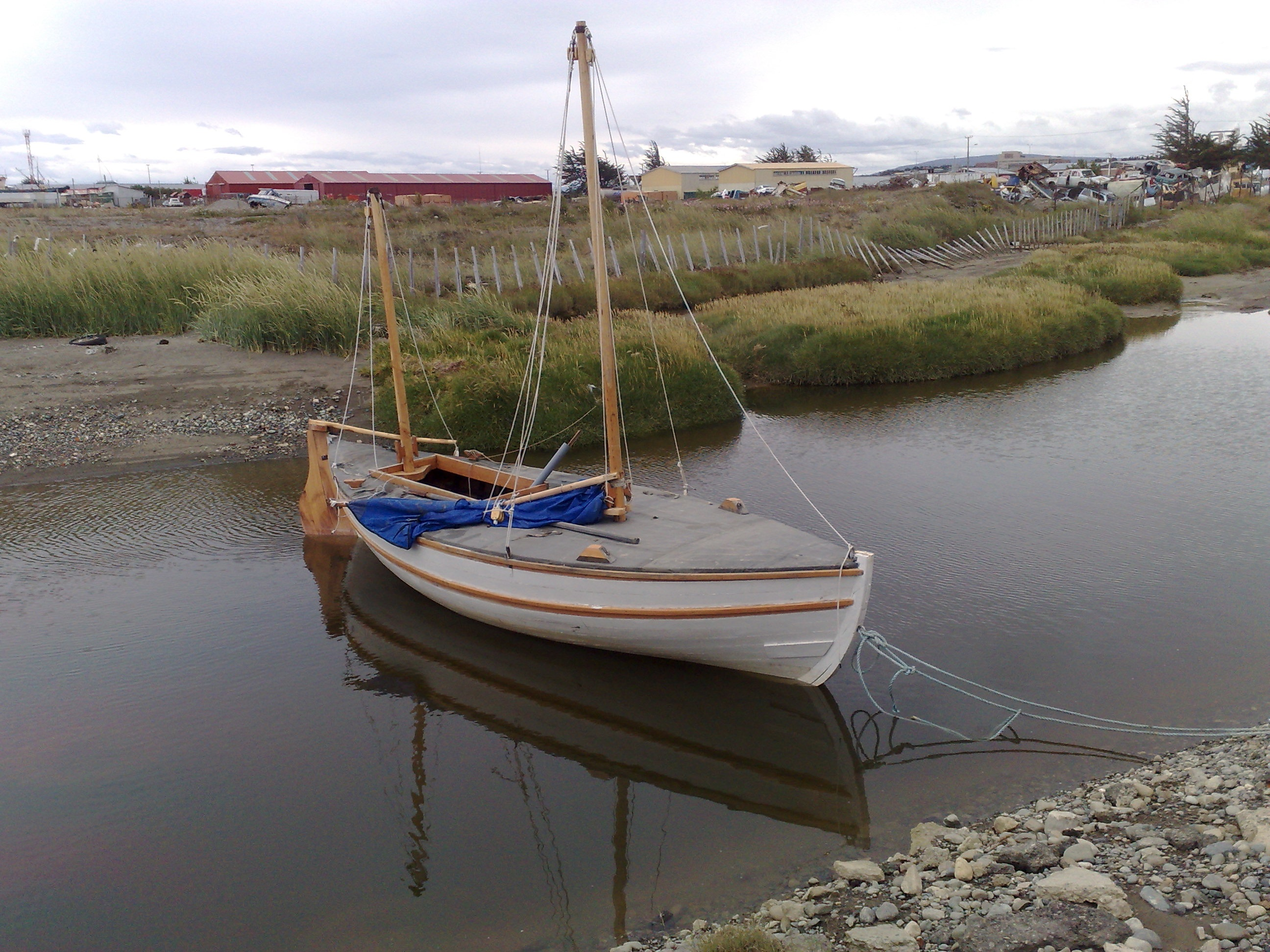
The replica of James Caird afloat in the river next to the museum.

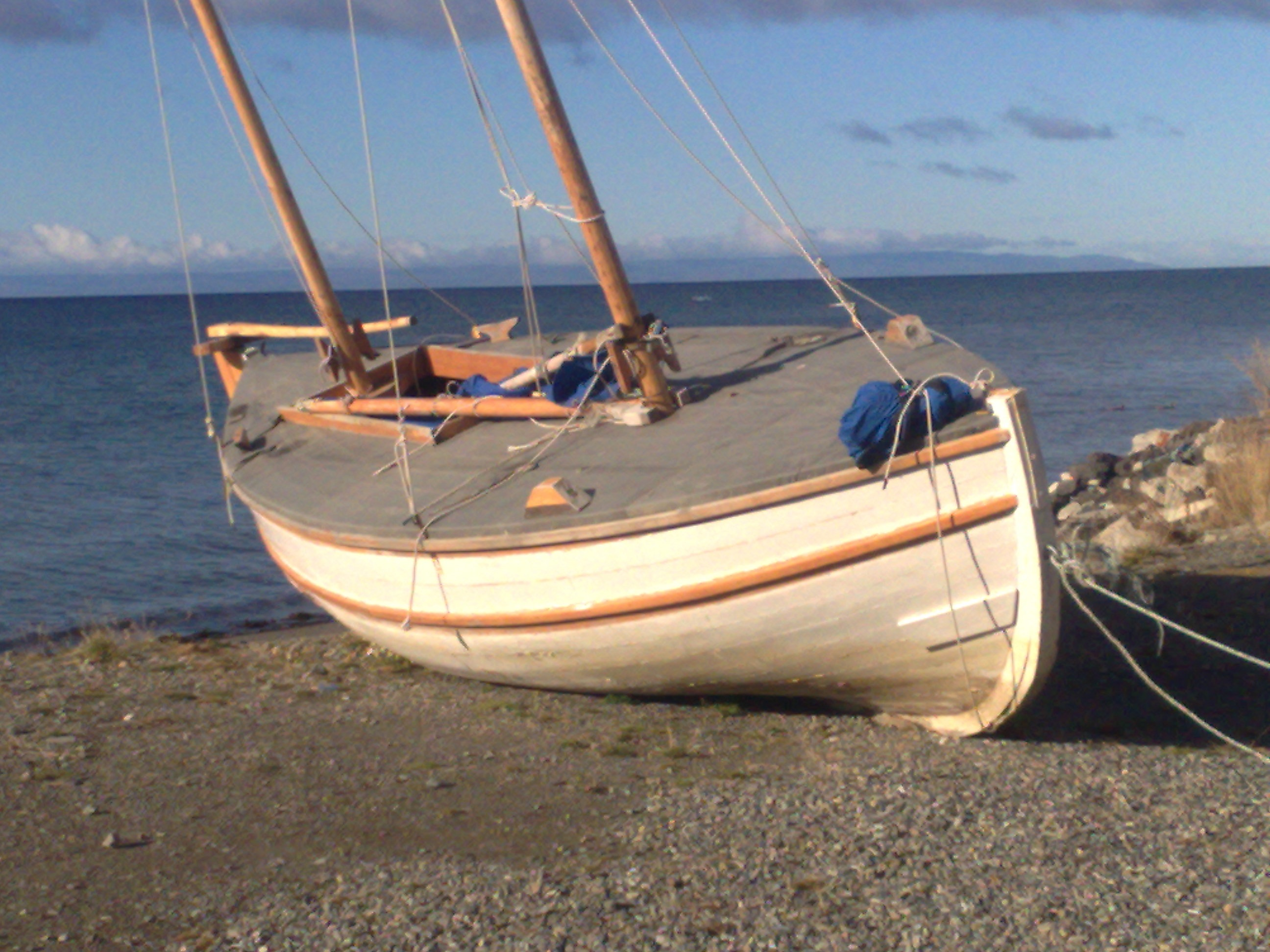
The replica of James Caird to the Strait of Magellan, with in the background the Tierra del Fuego.

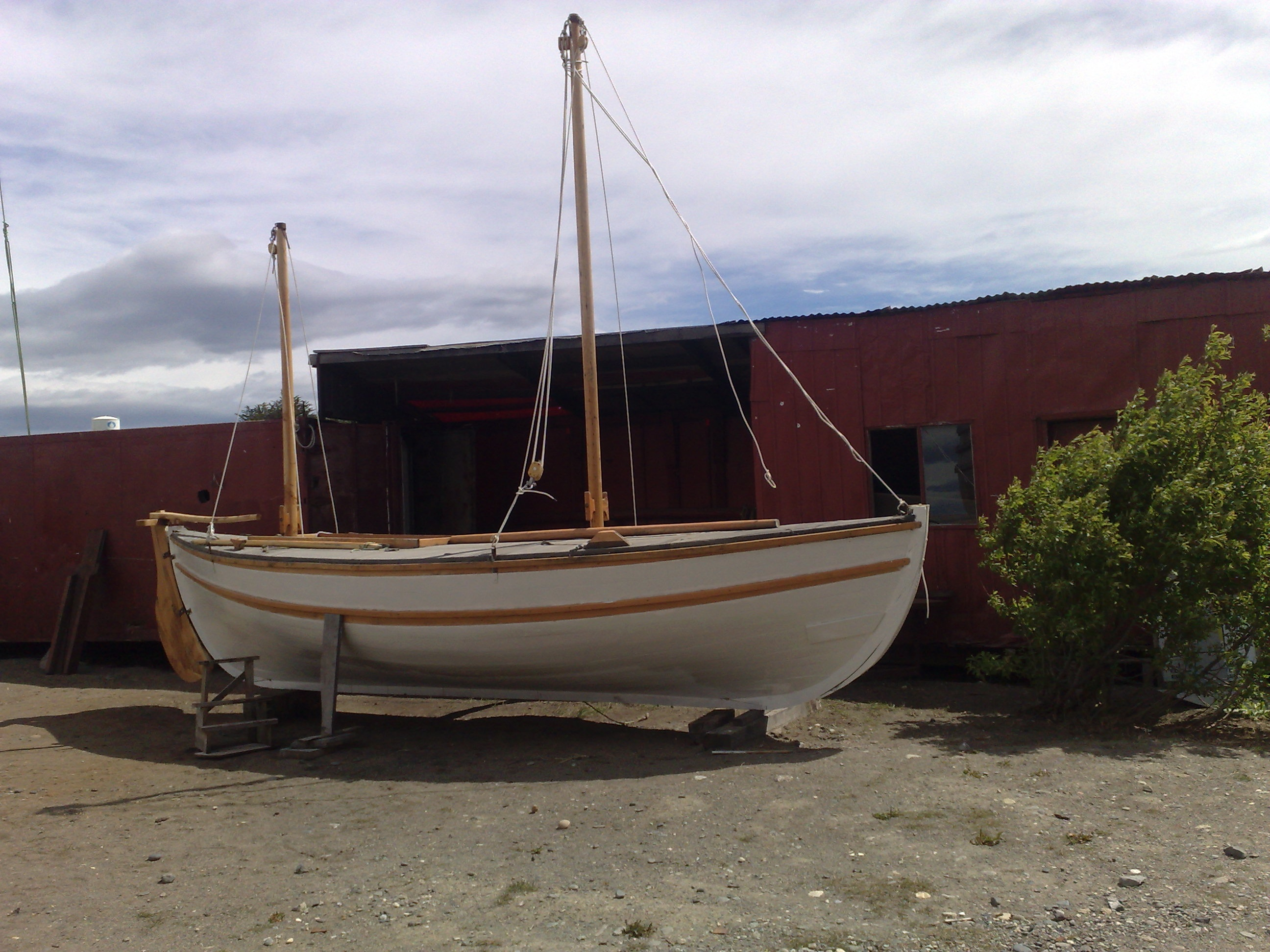
The replica of James Caird in the workshop before being released in the museum.

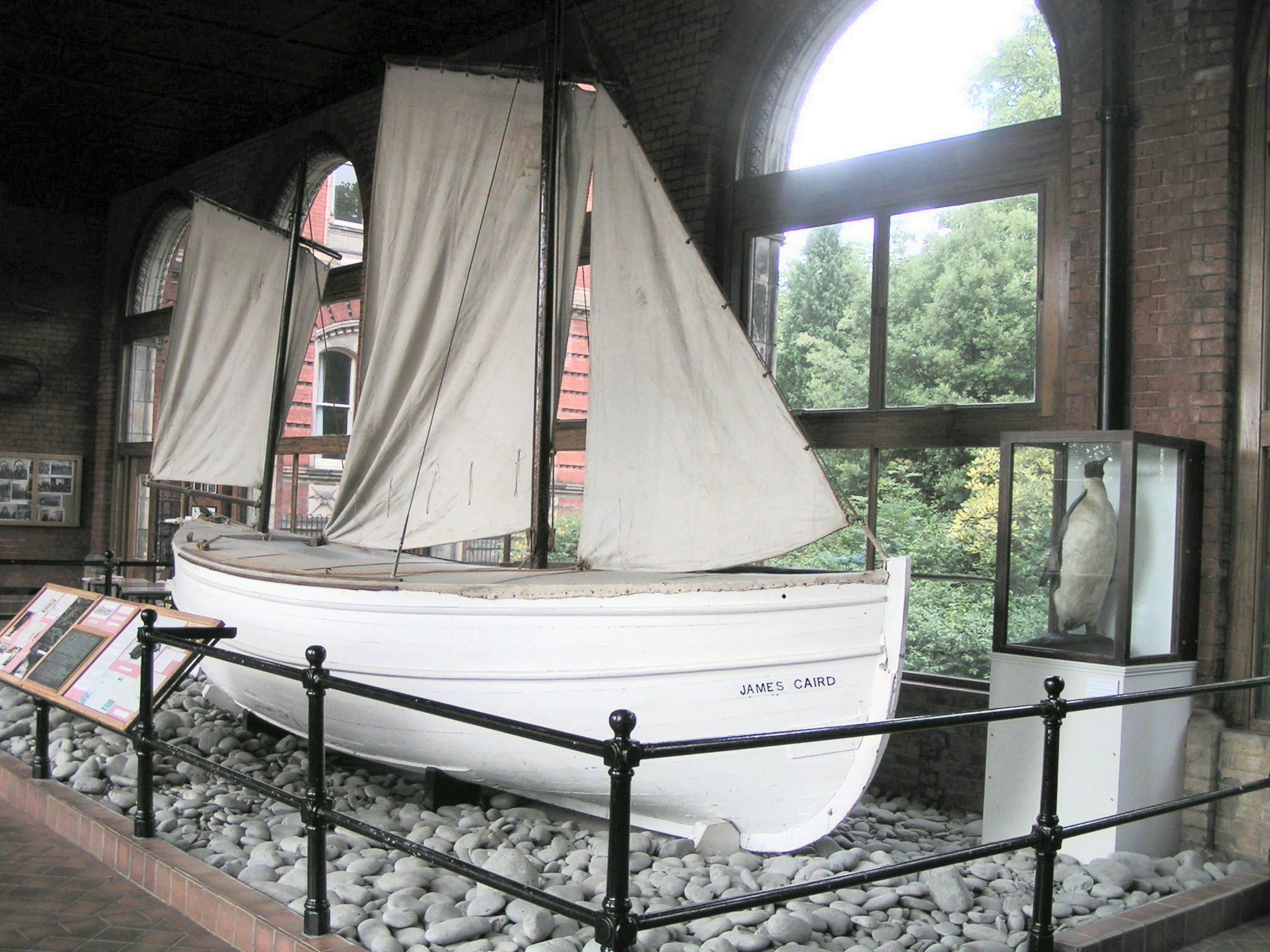
The original James Caird displayed at Dulwich College, London.

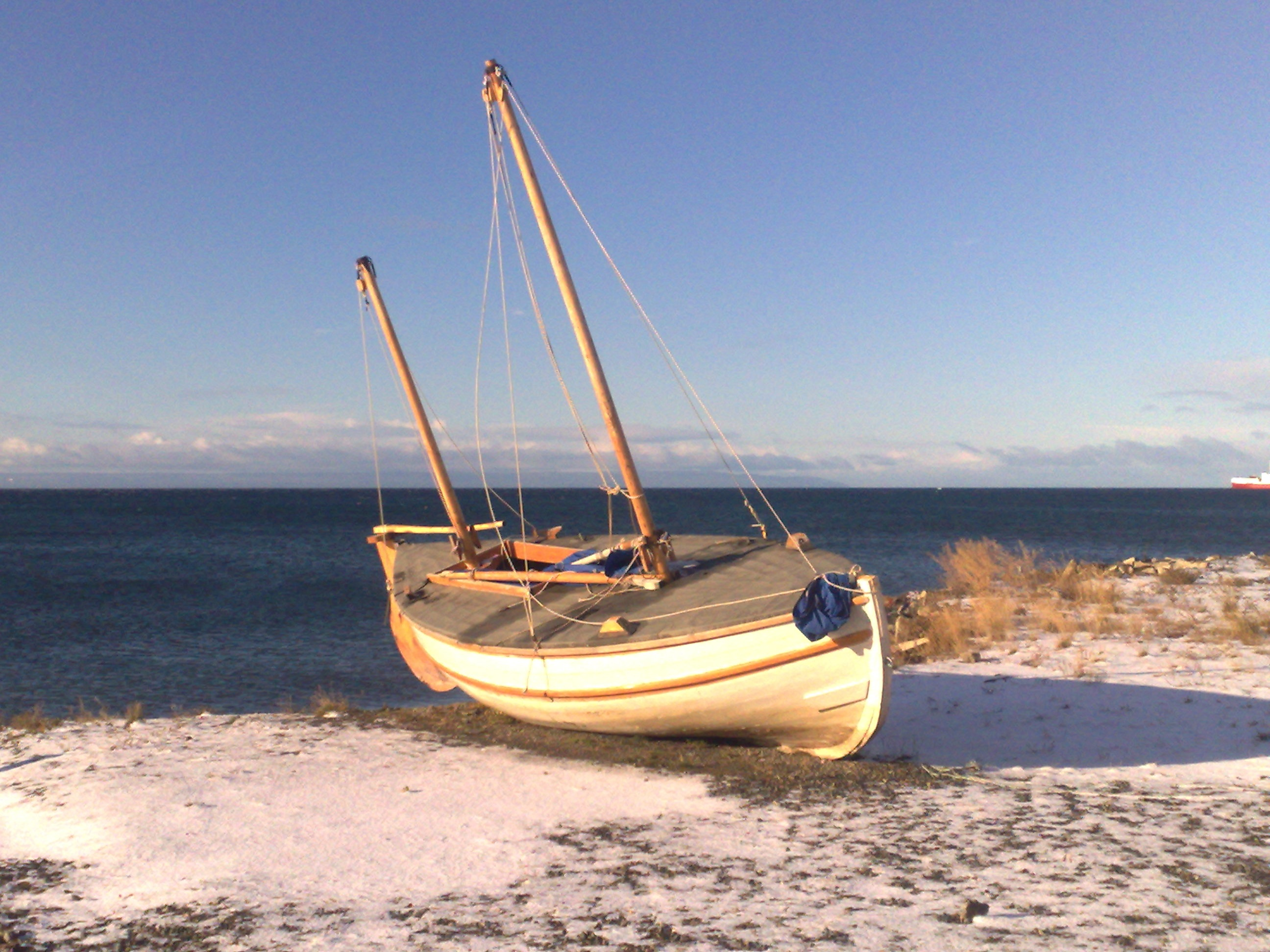
The replica of James Caird at the Museo Nao Victoria in winter with snow.

==== Schooner Ancud ====
Ancud was the ship that, under an 1843 mandate of the President of Chile, Manuel Bulnes, claimed the Strait of Magellan on behalf of Chile's newly independent government, building Fort Bulnes. The commander of the schooner was Captain John Williams Wilson. On 31 December 2011, the museum announced the construction of a replica of the schooner in its shipbuilding workshop; the replica Ancud was opened to public on 5 September 2012.

Ancud
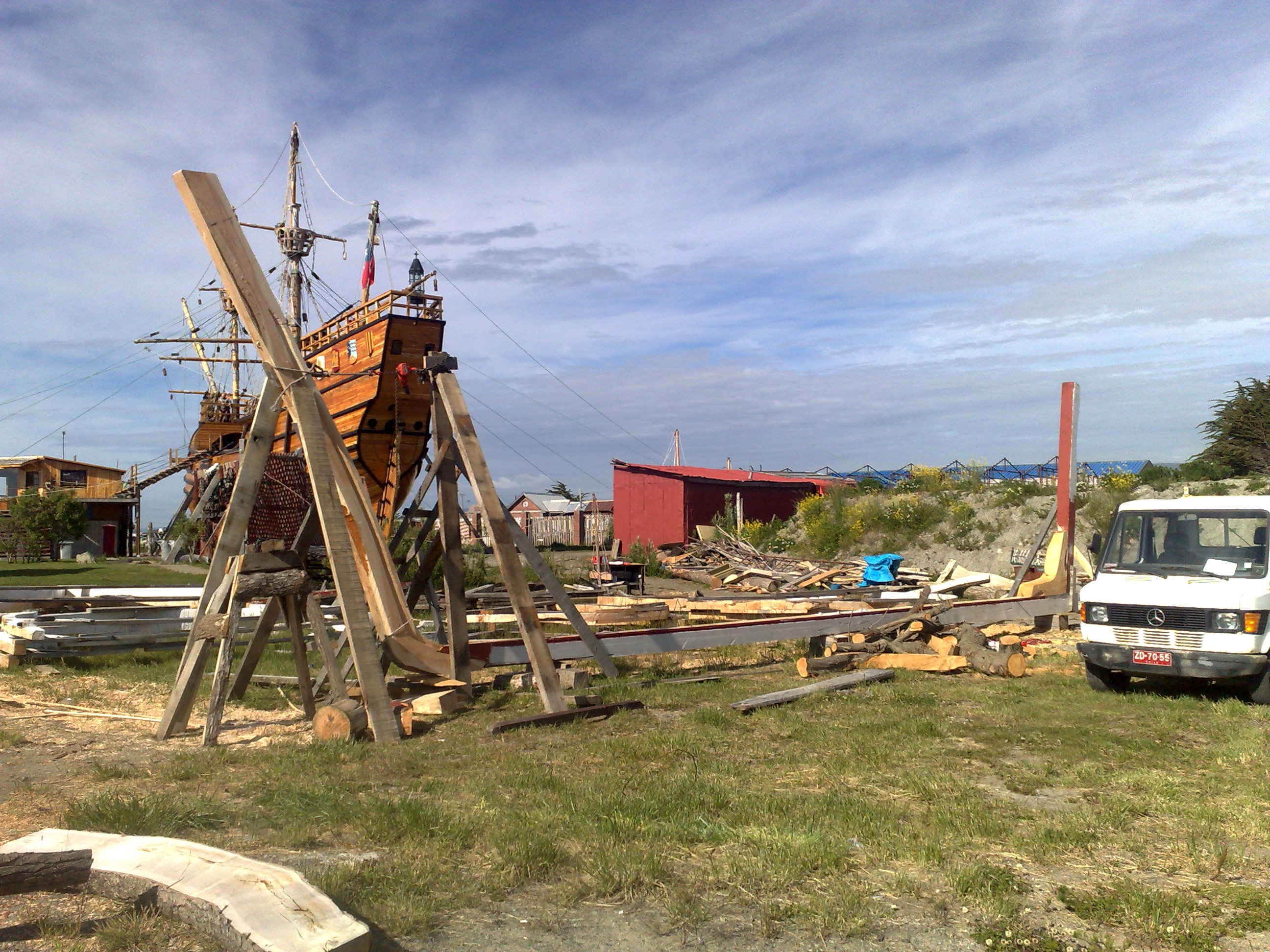
The replica of Ancud, bow, keel and stern, with in the background the Nao Victoria.

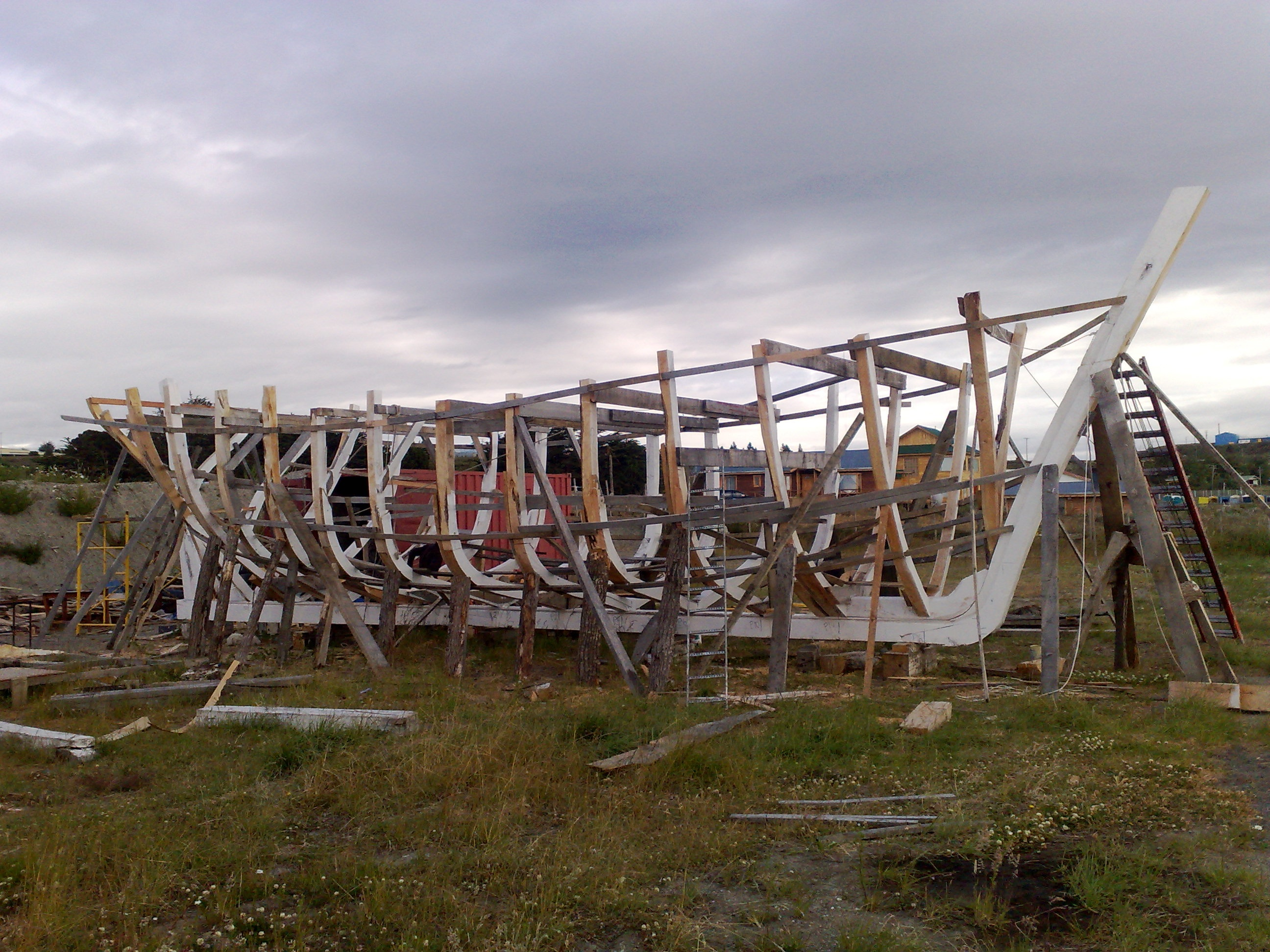
The replica of Ancud, complete hull structure.

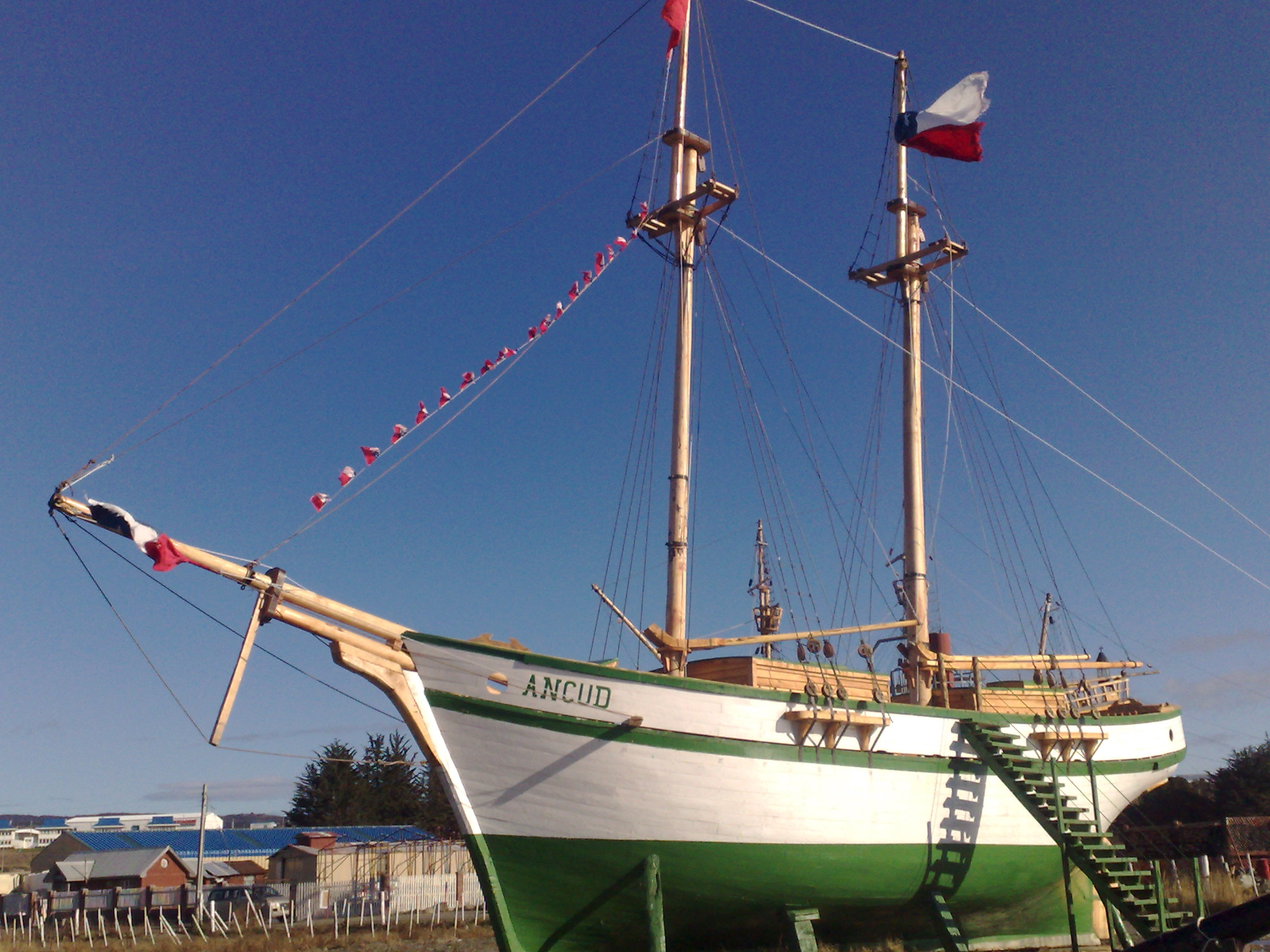
Ancud replica.

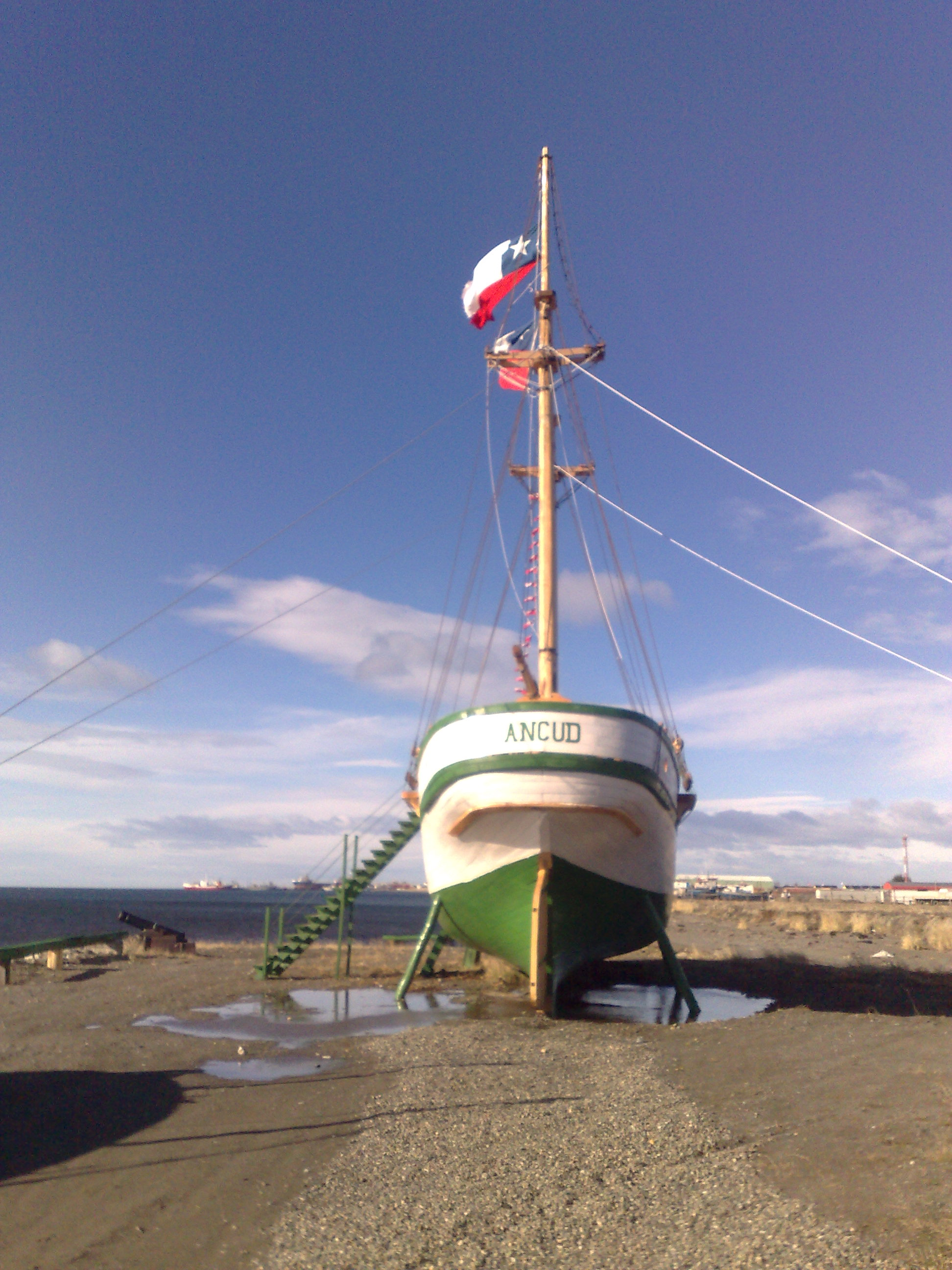
Stern view of Ancud replica.

==== HMS Beagle ====
HMS Beagle, a British Navy brig-sloop, was converted into an exploration vessel. The most famous of her three trips was the second one under the command of Captain FitzRoy. On board was the young Charles Darwin. HMS Beagle remained in the Magellan Region for almost three years, and the observations made by Darwin were influential in the development of his theory of evolution. The construction of the full-size HMS Beagle replica started in November 2012. Four years later, in November 2016, the museum announced that the vessel was completed.

HMS Beagle
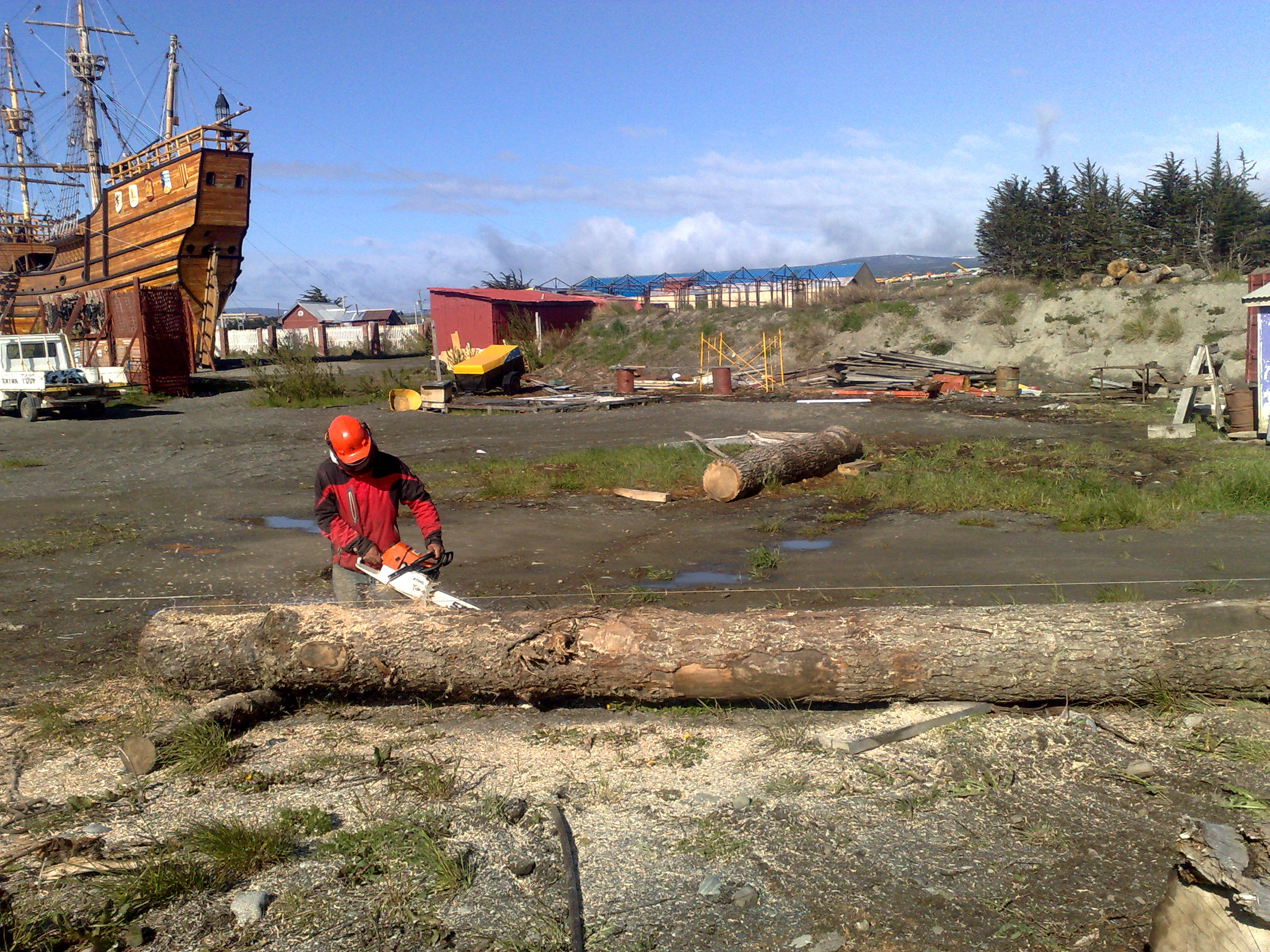
First cut for HMS Beagle's keel.

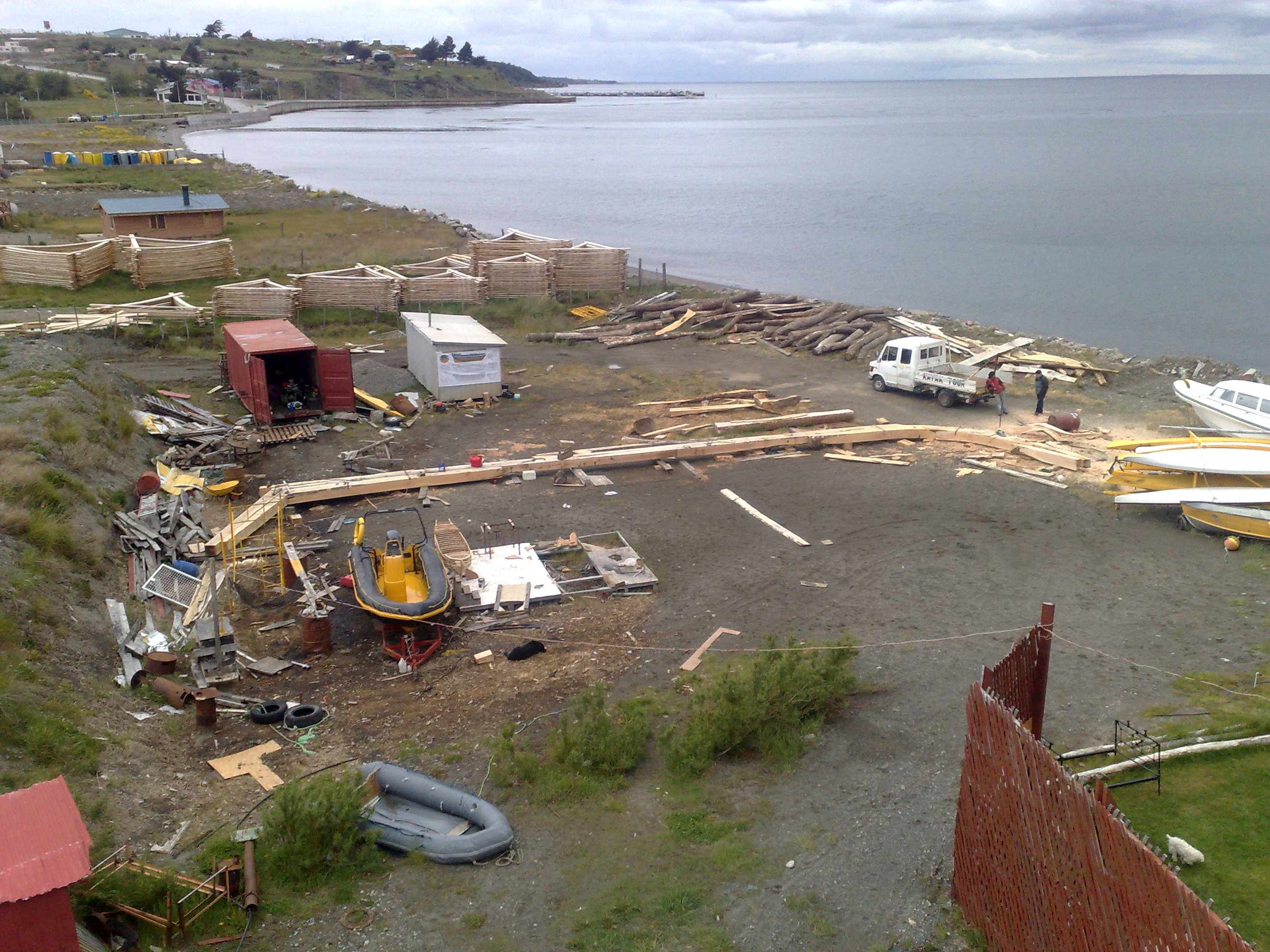
Keel, stem and stern of the 1:1 replica of HMS Beagle ready for installation in Nao Victoria Museum of Punta Arenas

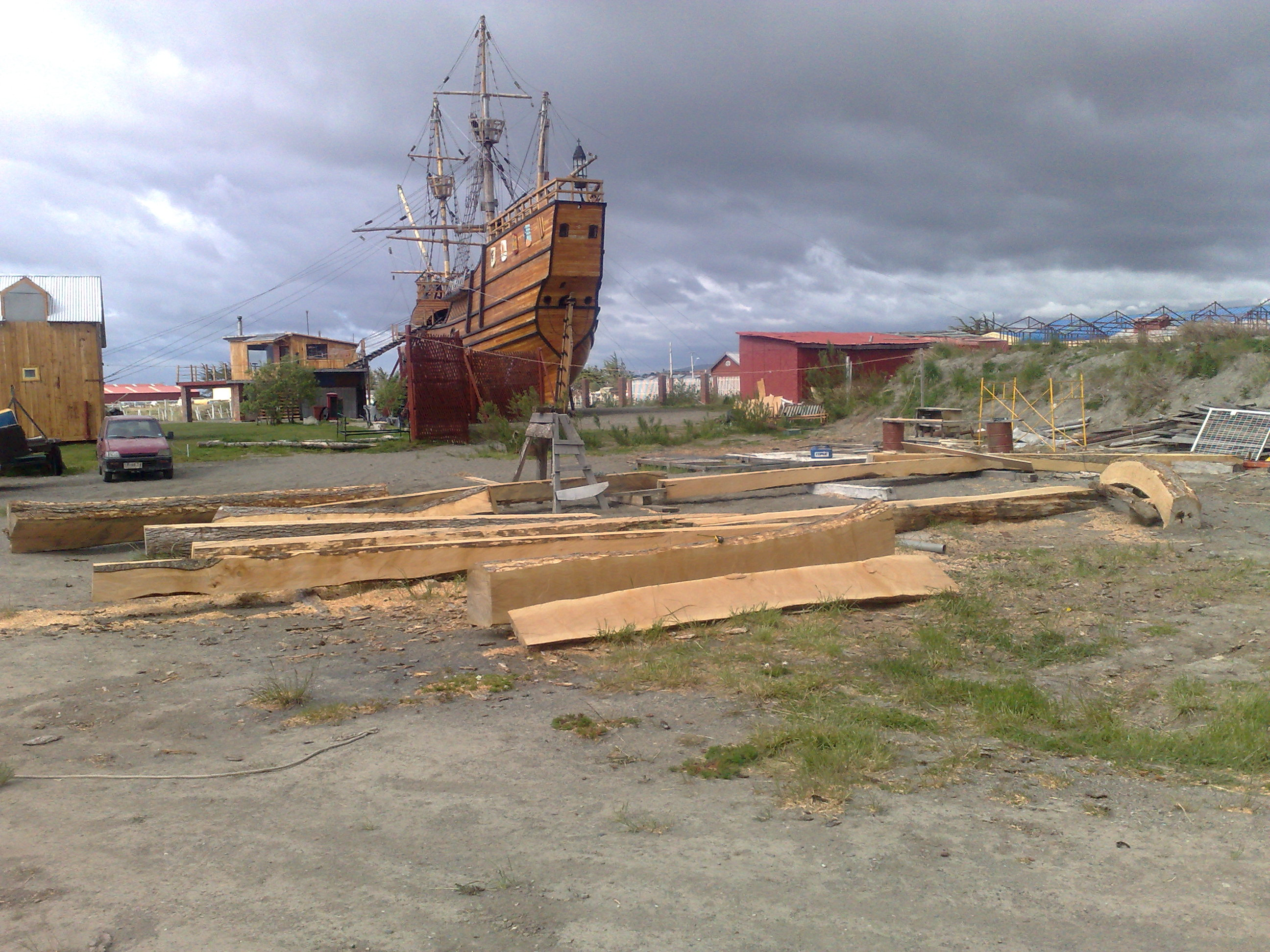
Nao Victoria looming over HMS Beagle's replica construction site

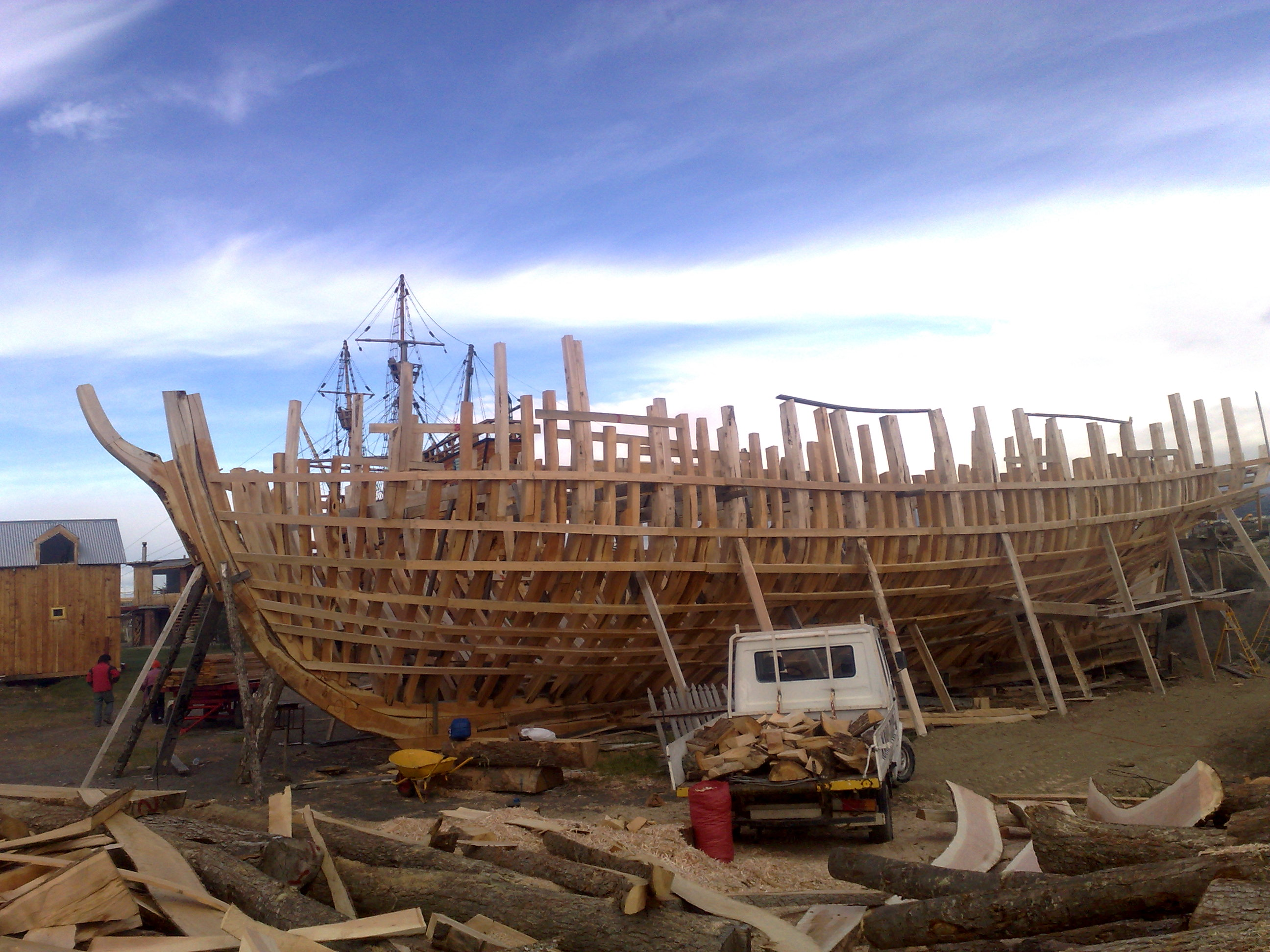
Starboard side view of HMS Beagle's replica

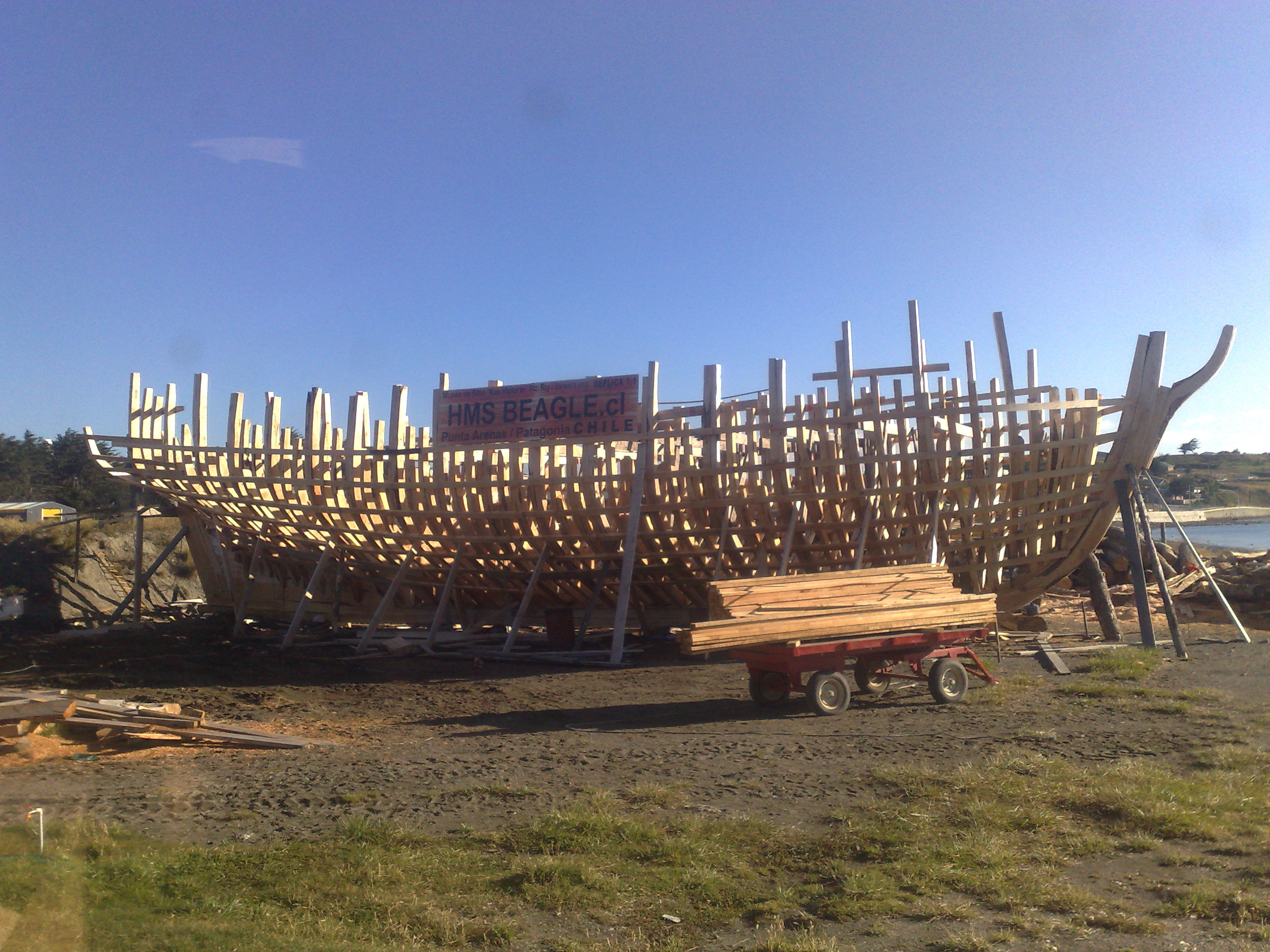
State of HMS Beagle's replica building process as of 20 March 2013

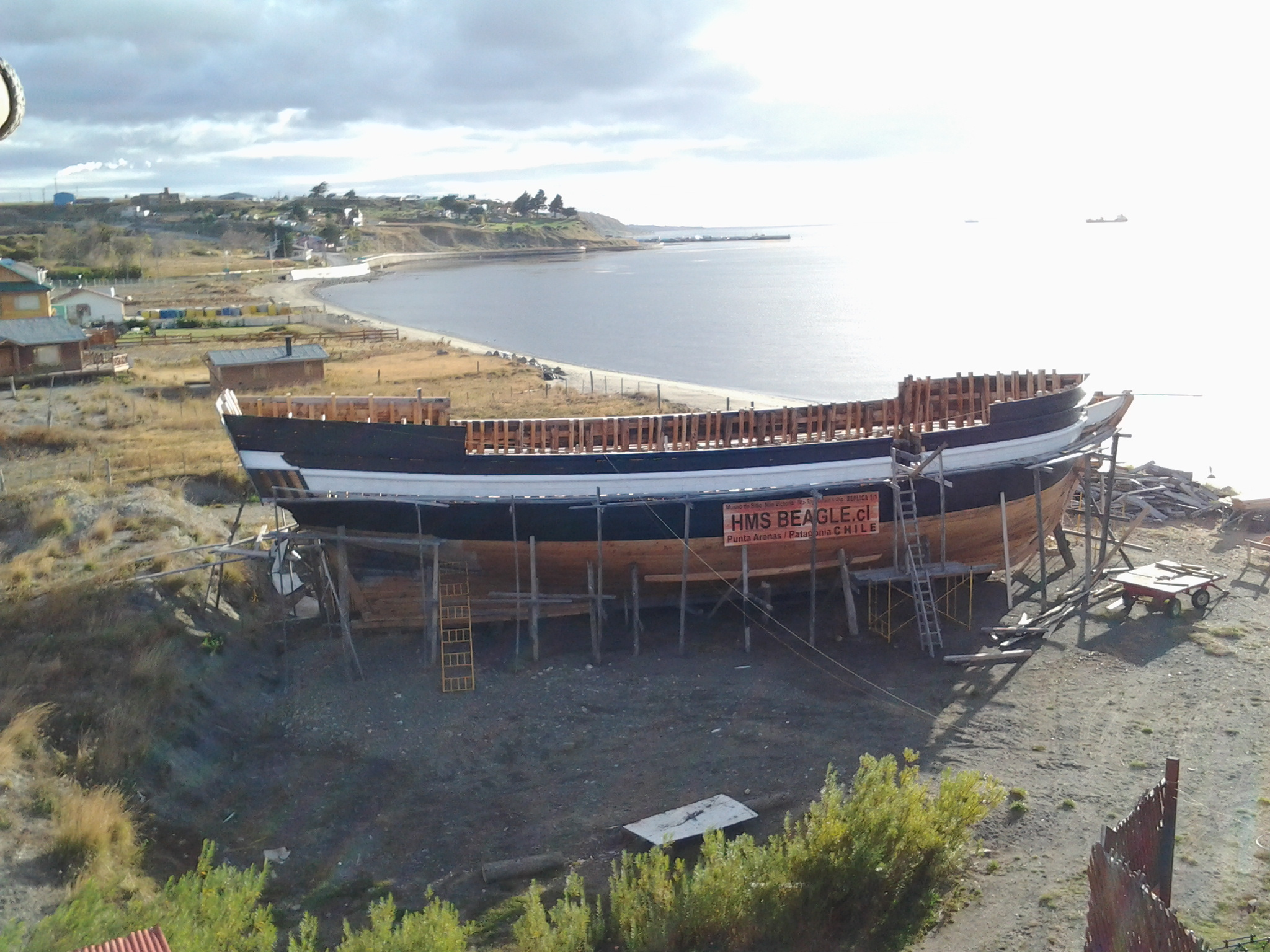
Completed hull of the 1:1 replica of HMS Beagle being painted in Nao Victoria Museum in Punta Arenas

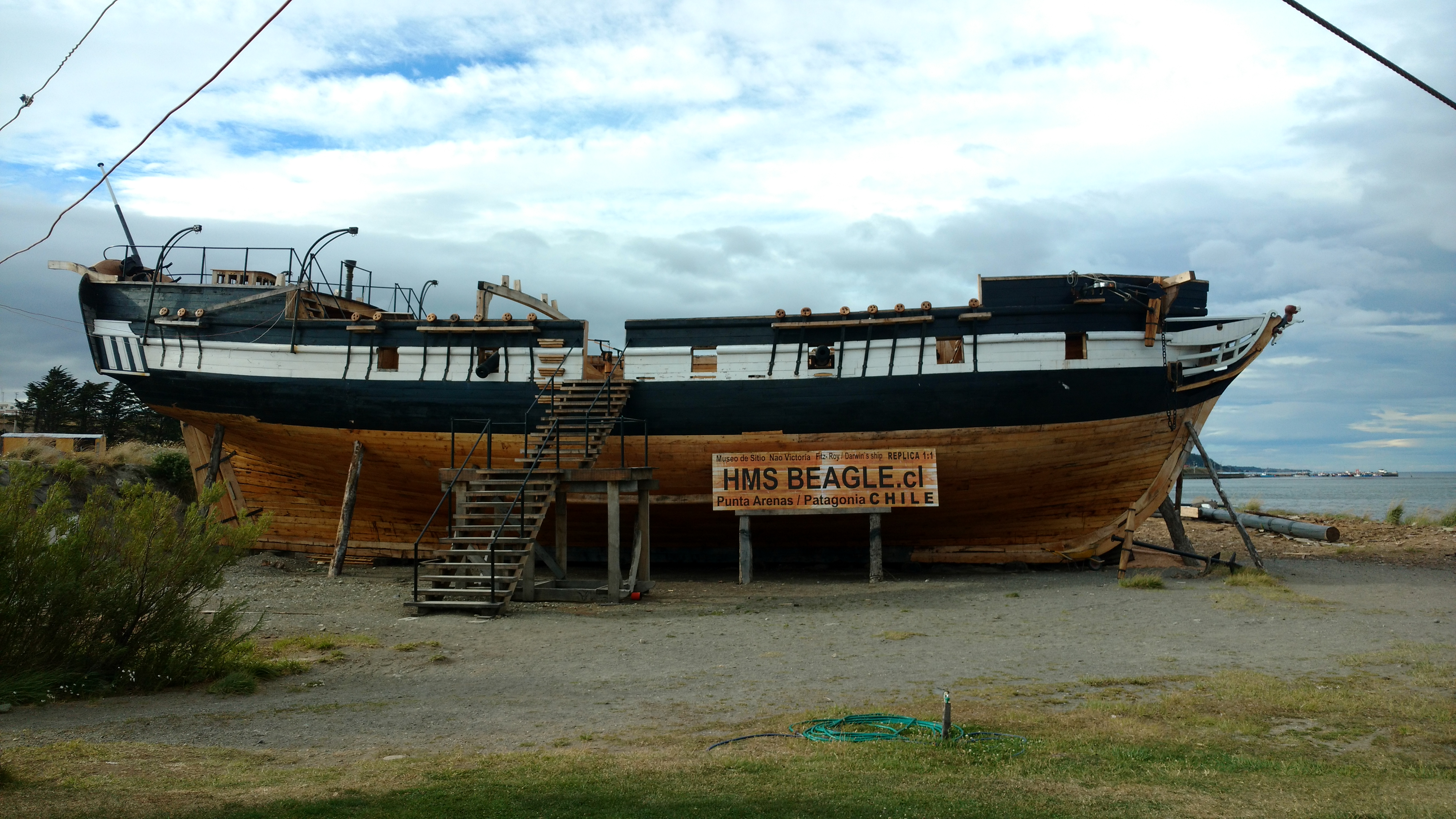
The replica in February 2016

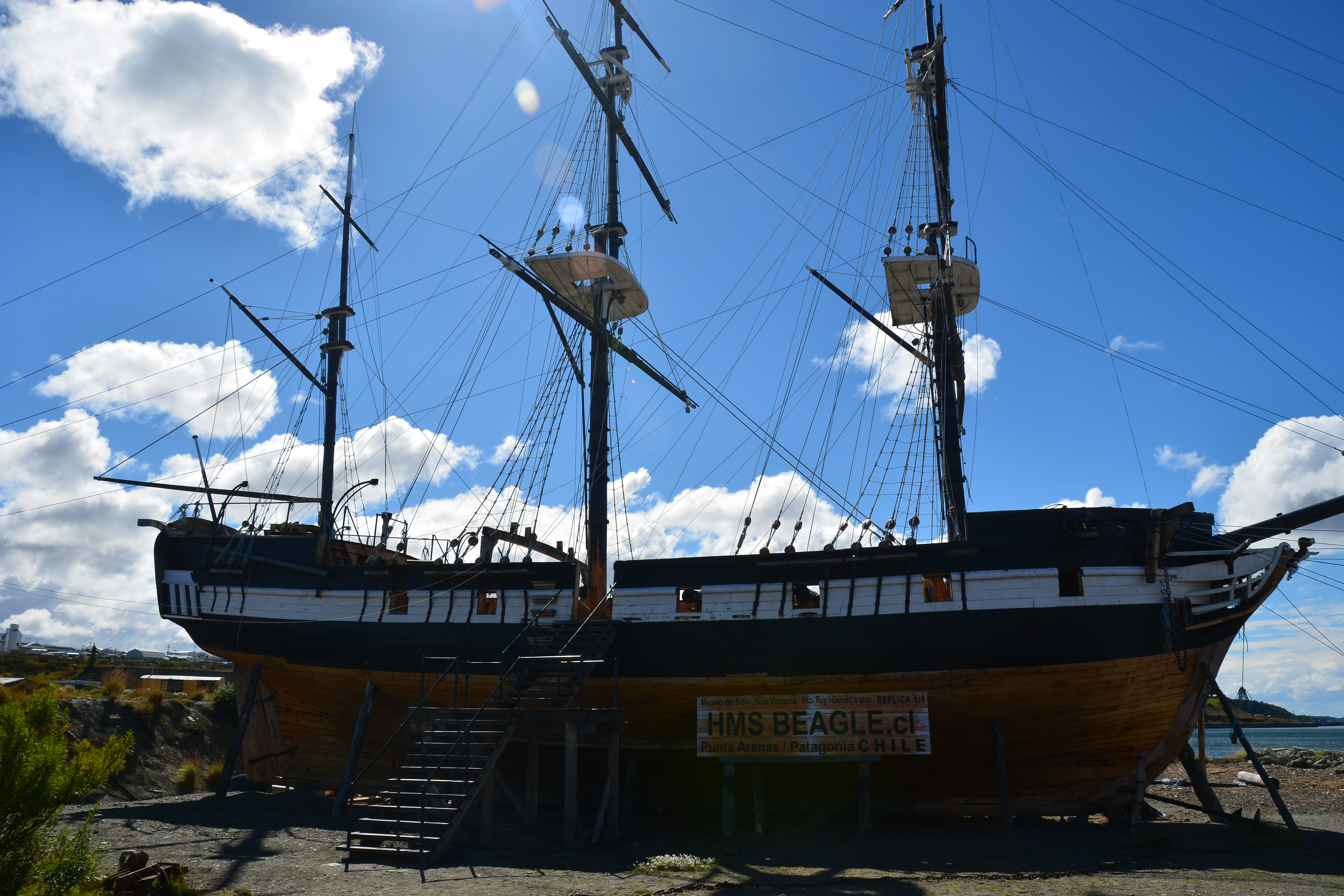
Update on the construction of the replica in February 2017

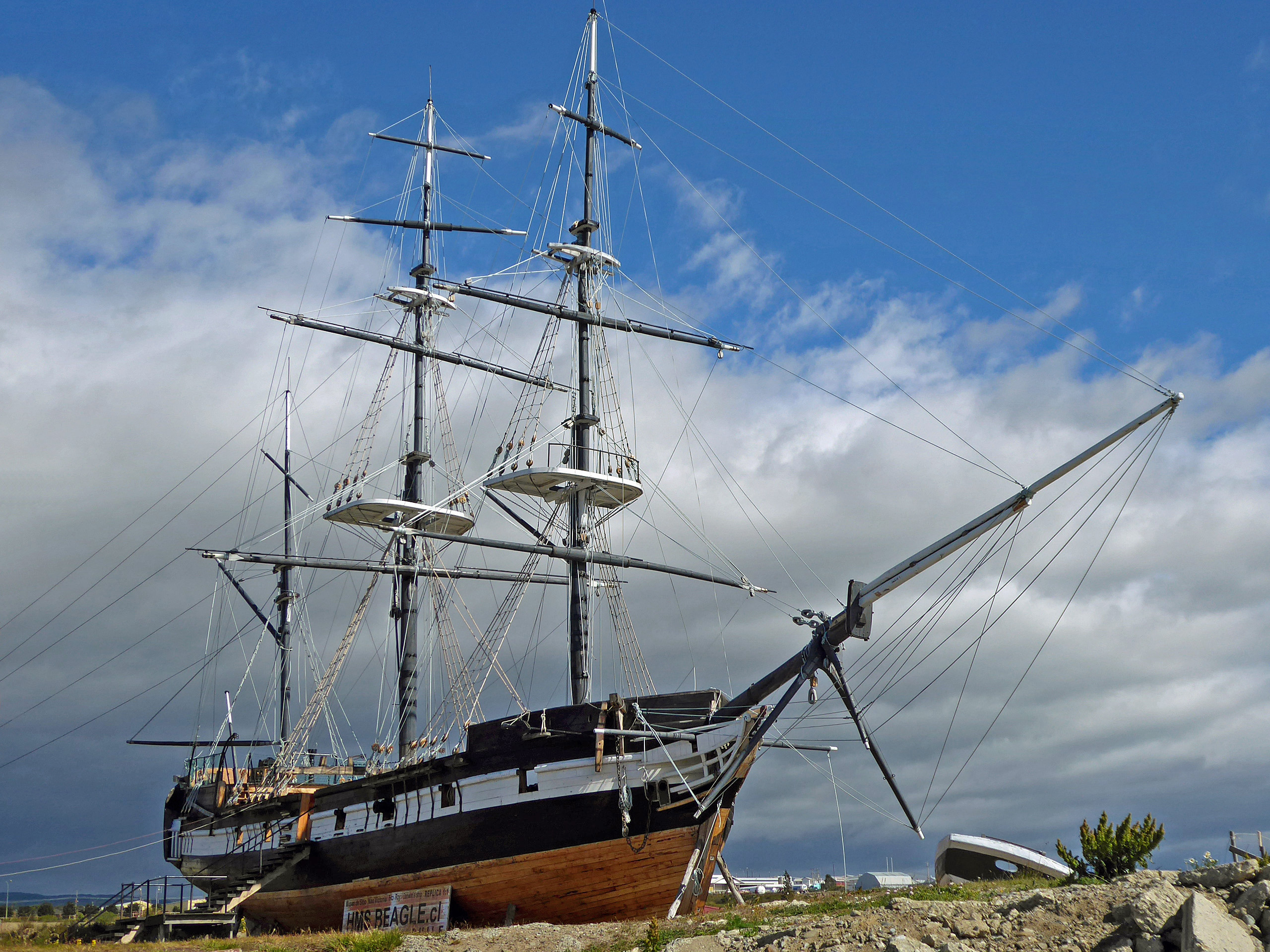
Replica of HMS Beagle 2018

=== Other collections ===
- Antique weapons – The replicas of historic ships are equipped with replicas of ancient firearms such as bombards, cannons, and muskets as well as handweapons like halberds, crossbows, and swords. All these weapons can be used by visitors.
- Ancient sailing instruments – In the different areas of the boats there are replicas of astrolabes, nocturnals, quadrants, Jacob's staffs, chip logs, and hourglasses.
- Copies of original documents – The capitulation and instructions given by Emperor Charles V to Magellan and Ruy Faleiro, the accounts of the Atarazanas Reales de Sevilla on the expenditures and revenues of the expedition, the log of Francisco Albo, Ginés de Mafra's book, the de Moluccis Insular of Maximilianus Transylvanus, drawings from the book of Antonio Pigafetta, the map of Juan de la Cosa, the book Primaleon of Francisco Vasquez of Palmerin.

== Shipbuilding workshop ==
During summer 2013 the shipbuilding workshop of the museum built a one-third scale replica of an 18th-century galleon.

The 1:3 replica of a galleon of the eighteenth century
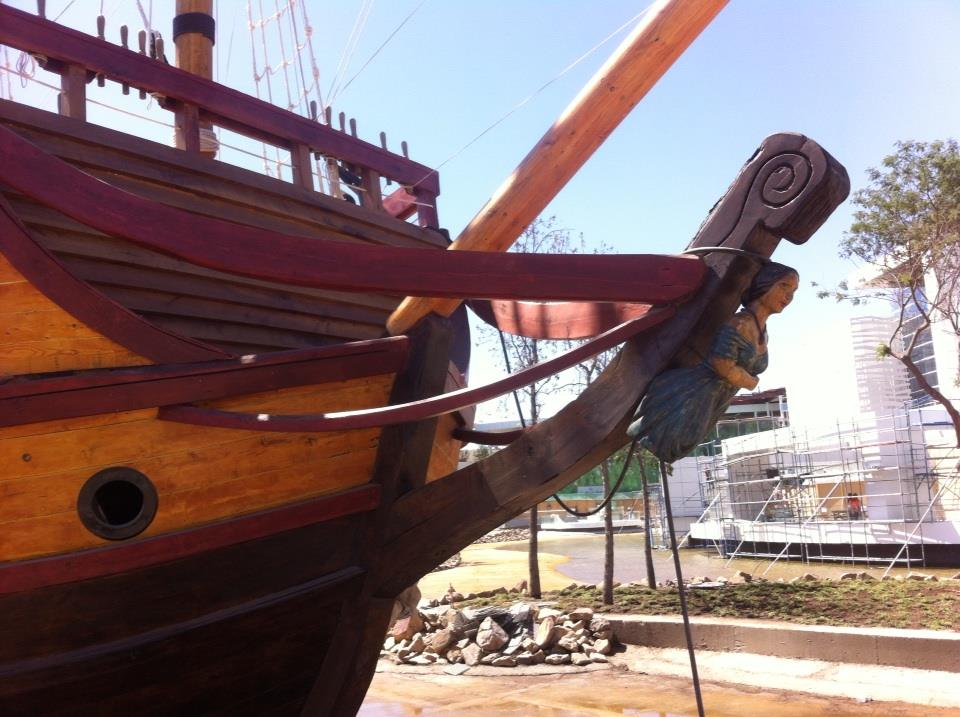
Figurehead of 1:3 scale replica of a Galleon built in Santiago by the Nao Victoria Museum Punta Arenas

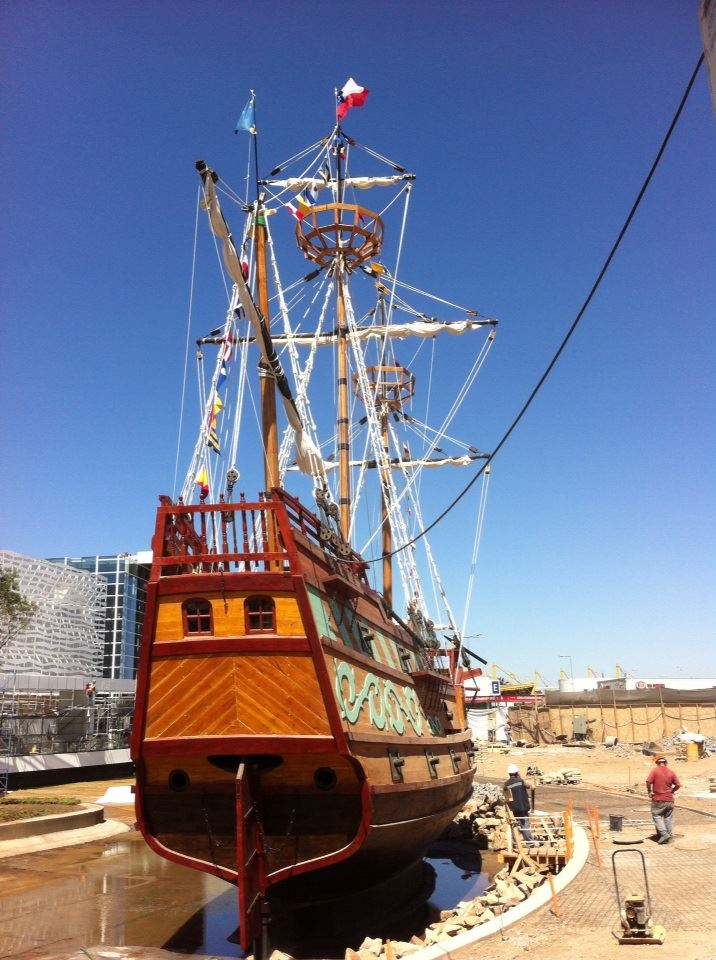
Transom of 1:3 scale replica of a Galleon built in Santiago by the Nao Victoria Museum of Punta Arenas

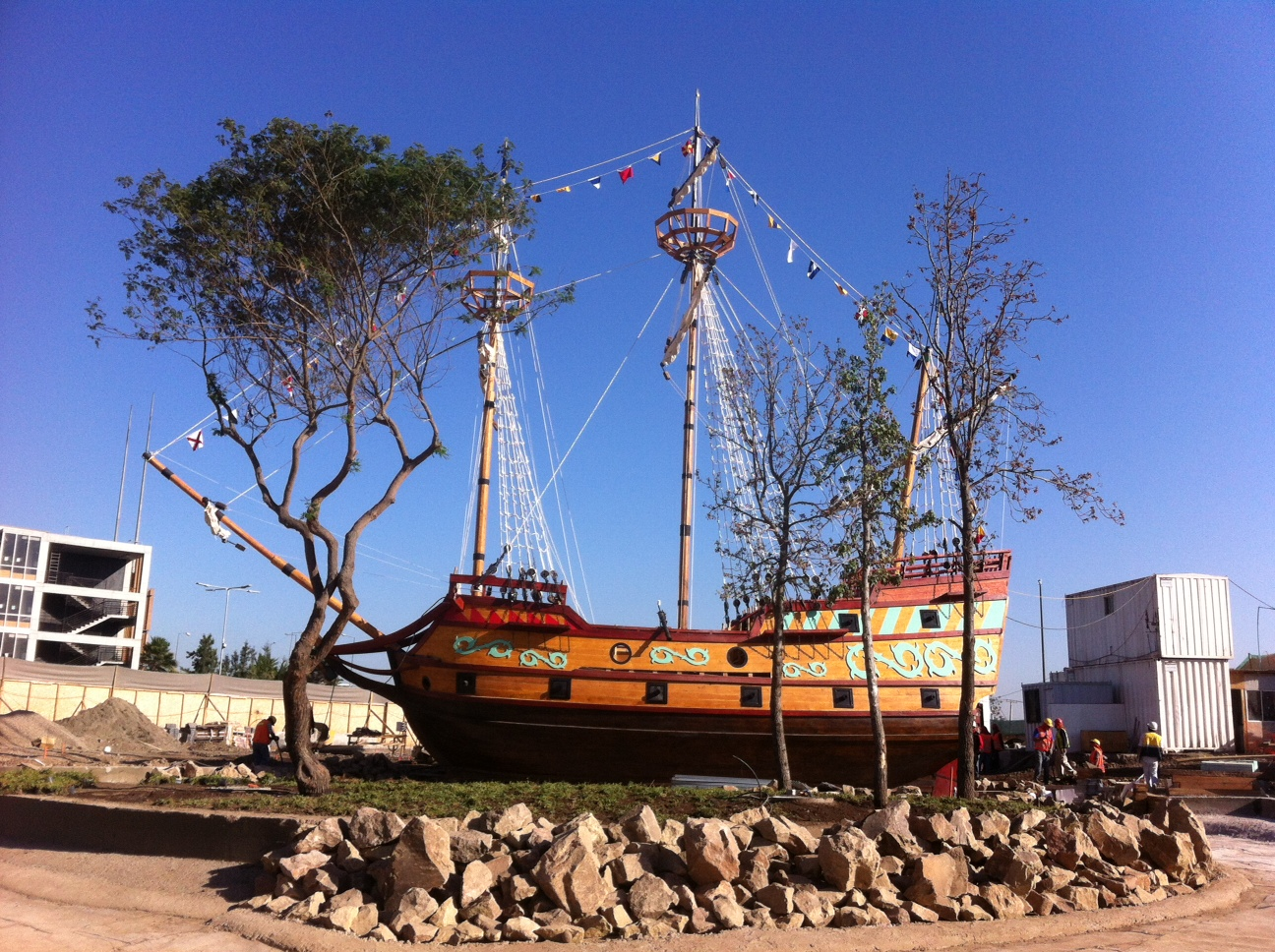
Starboard view of a 1:3 scale replica of a Galleon built in Santiago by the Nao Victoria Museum of Punta Arenas

== See also ==
- Ferdinand Magellan
- Magellan's circumnavigation
- Ginés de Mafra
