= USS Enterprise (1831) =

US Navy schooner

History

United States
- Name: USS Enterprise
- Builder: New York Navy Yard
- Launched: 26 October 1831
- Commissioned: 15 December 1831
- Decommissioned: 24 June 1844
- Fate: Sold, 28 October 1844

General characteristics
- Type: Schooner
- Displacement: 194 long tons (197 t)
- Length: 88 ft (27 m)
- Beam: 23 ft 6 in (7.16 m)
- Draft: 10 ft (3.0 m)
- Propulsion: Sail
- Complement: 72 officers and enlisted
- Armament: 2 × 9-pounder guns; 8 × 24-pounder carronades

The fourth USS Enterprise was a United States Navy schooner.

She was launched by the New York Navy Yard on 26 October 1831, and commissioned on 15 December 1831, Lieutenant S. W. Downing in command. Enterprise sailed on 12 January 1832 for South America where she patrolled the Brazil Station guarding United States' interests until April 1834. Returning to New York at that time, she repaired and refitted until July when she departed again for Brazil.

Ten months later she joined sloop Peacock for a cruise to the Far East by way of Africa, India and the East Indies. Continuing eastward, Enterprise called at Honolulu, Hawaii, in September 1836, then proceeded to the west coast of Mexico, arriving at Mazatlán on 28 October 1836. She cruised the west coast of South America until March 1839, when she departed Valparaíso, Chile to round the Horn, call at Rio de Janeiro, and sail on to Philadelphia. Here she was inactivated on 12 July 1839.

Enterprise was recommissioned 29 November 1839, and on 16 March 1840, sailed from New York for South America. After four years of protecting U.S. commerce on this station, she turned north for home. In 1843 Enterprise was encountered by Chilean schooner Ancud at Puerto Americano in the fjords and channels of Patagonia. Deeming Enterprise to be engaging in contraband with the Yates family of local settlers Chilean-British commander John Williams Wilson had his men board Enterprise forcing her to leave. On 20 June 1844, Enterprise entered the Boston Navy Yard and four days later was decommissioned for the last time. She was sold 28 October 1844.

== See also ==
- List of ships of the United States Navy named Enterprise

Preceded by 1799	USS Enterprise; 1831-1844	Succeeded by 1874
