= Discovery of Chile =

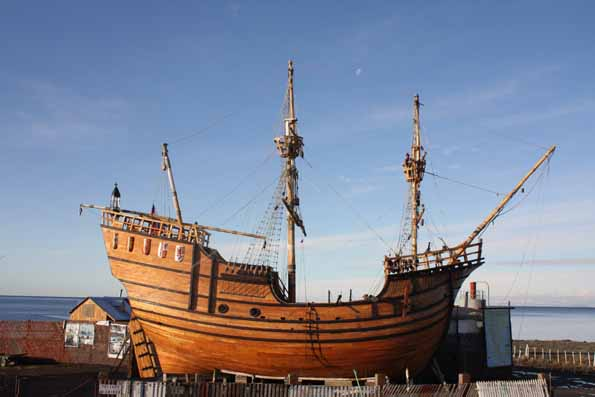
replica of the Nao Victoria in Museum Nao Victoria in Punta Arenas, Chile

The first European to pass through Chile was Ferdinand Magellan, in 1520, following the passage in the Strait which bears his name on a wall, at the southern tip of Latin America. Following the conquest of the Aztec Empire by Hernán Cortés between 1518 and 1521, a new wave of territorial expansion occurred in the direction of the Inca Empire from 1532—this was exercised by Francisco Pizarro. A partial conquest of Chile started from 1535, which resulted in minor Spanish settlements in the area.

There is controversy regarding the use of the term "discovery" to refer to the European discovery of Chile and any other country, as from a collective human perspective, all lands have been inhabited by different human groups.

In the 19th century, chilean historian José Toribio Medina established that Magallanes was the first european who discovered Chile, not Diego de Almagro. This claim was reinforced in the 20th century by Jaime Eyzaguirre and Mateo Martinic in the 21st century.

== Diego de Almagro's expedition (1536) ==
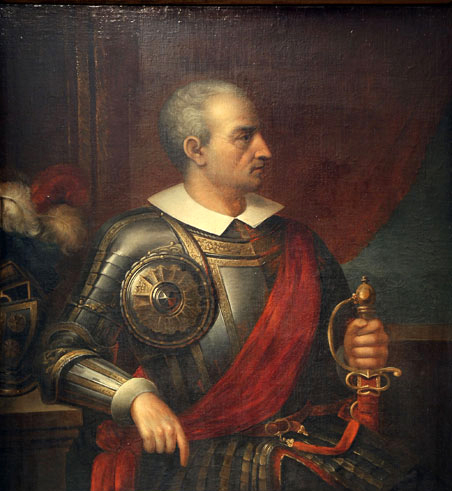
Diego de Almagro

The initial phase of the conquest was superintended by Diego de Almagro—a notable lieutenant of Francisco Pizarro. At the time, Almagro governed half of Peru, while Pizarro, the other half and served as the viceroy of the colony. As the first man to reach Cusco was disputed, Almagro planned a conquest of Chile to augment his honour. His expedition consisted of approximately 500 Spaniards and several thousand people indigenous to the place. While traveling, the group suffered significant losses. In March 1536, Almagro arrived in Chile, whereupon he ordered strongholds to be constructed there. However, as the indigenous people were hostile to the Spanish foreigners, especially with the Mapuche tribes viewing them very negatively, violence between the parties erupted, culminating with the Battle of Reynogüelén (1536), which compelled a retreat through the Atacama Desert. Upon returning, Almagro's conflicts with Pizarro manifested once more. He was stripped of his title as governor and sentenced to death by Pizarro's orders, with the affair ending in his beheading in 1538.

== Pedro de Valdivia's conquests (1541–1553) ==
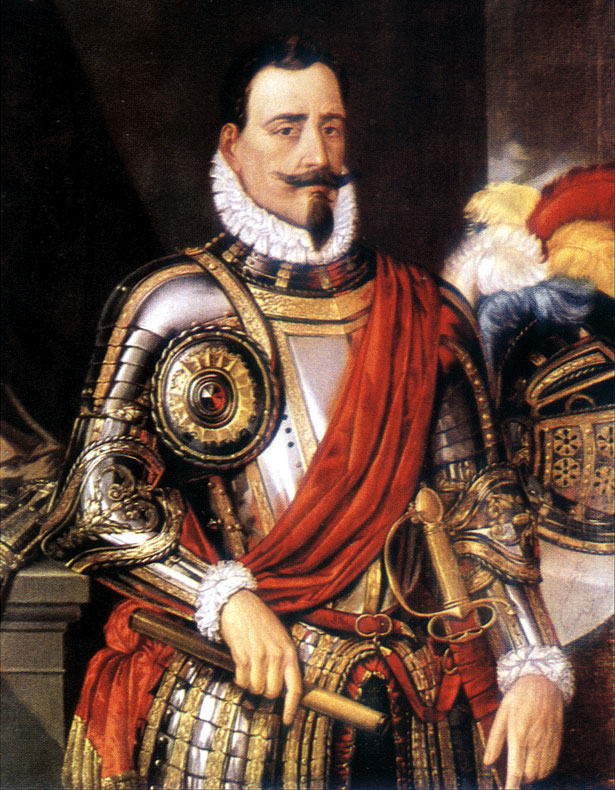
Pedro de Valdivia

In 1540, a new phase of conquest in Chile began. It was directed by Pedro de Valdivia, who died during the expedition. Trying for recruitment, Valdivia failed to acquire a large force, partly due to the region's scarcity of wealth and attitudes of the indigenous peoples. Nonetheless, he had designated the same route as Almagro for his expedition—the Atacama Desert. Reaching the Copiapó Valley, he founded settlements which would later become major cities in Chile: Santiago del Nuevo Extremo (now known as Santiago de Chile, since the date of independence in 1810) in 1541 and La Serena in 1544. He was later appointed governor of Chile in 1550 and resumed his conquest southwards, engaging in battles against the Mapuche tribes.

He died during the capture of Fort Tucapel in 1553. Despite his death, however, numerous other cities were named after him and his conquest was to be resolved under the command of one of his lieutenants. The fight against the Mapuche ended in 1561.

== Other expeditions ==
Juan Sebastián Elcano, informing Charles V about the Strait of Magellan, prompted the king to organise a fleet, to which he assigned the command to Fray García Jofré de Loaysa. The expedition started at La Coruna on July 24, 1525, to enter the Strait on April 8, 1526. During the process, the first recorded shipwreck in Chile occurred when the ship Santic Espíritus, commanded by Juan Sebastián Elcano, sank miles west of the current Dungeness Point.

== See also ==
- Colonial Chile
- Incas in Central Chile
- Mapuche history
