= Puerto Americano =

Coordinates: 45°2′0.13″S 73°41′57.43″W

Puerto Americano is a natural harbour in the fjords and channels of Patagonia. The harbour lies southwest of Tangbac Island near where the west-east Nihualac Channel meets the north-south Moraleda Channel in Aysén Region.

In the summer of 1793 the harbour was visited by a Spanish expedition assembled in Chiloé Archipelago and led by José de Moraleda. At the time of Moraleda's arrival there were apple trees growing around the harbour, likely these were planted by indigenous sea-farers of Chiloé who used to visit the area.

In the first half of the 19th century two sailors from Cardiff, the Yates cousins, settled next to the harbour. From there they sold provisions to bypassing sailors. In the winter of 1843 a Chilean expedition on board of Ancud was heading to establish a Chilean settlement at the Strait of Magellan. When arriving for a stop-over in Puerto Americano it was noted that American schooner Enterprise and other vessels were in place to engage in untaxed barter with the settlers. The leader of the expedition, Juan Williams, considered this to be contraband upon which the Chilean soldiers of Ancud temporarily boarded Enterprise and forced the ship to leave. Williams, whose wife was a relative of the Yates cousins, imposed sanctions on them.

In the 2010s the harbour have been used occasionally as disembarkment point in the exploitation of mola rock crab.
