= Chilean schooner Ancud =

Schooner of the Chilean Navy

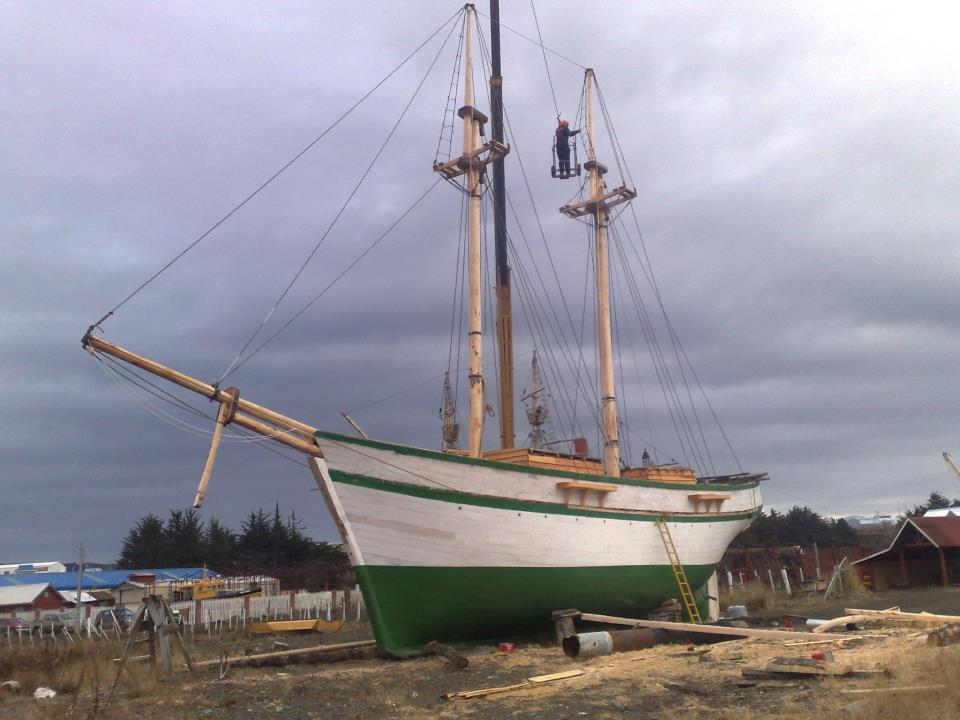
- The Schooner Ancud replica is one of the main attractions of the Museo Nao Victoria in Punta Arenas

History

Chile
- Name: Ancud
- Namesake: Ancud
- Operator: Chilean Navy
- Launched: 1843
- Commissioned: 1843
- Decommissioned: 1846

General characteristics
- Class & type: Schooner
- Tons burthen: 27 t
- Length: 15 m (49 ft)
- Beam: 3.80 m (12.5 ft)
- Draught: 2.78 m (9 ft 1 in)
- Propulsion: sail
- Armament: 4 guns x 20 lbs

The schooner Ancud was the ship sent by Chile in 1843 to claim sovereignty over the Strait of Magellan and establish Fuerte Bulnes, the first Chilean settlement in the strait. It was built for the purpose in the city of San Carlos de Ancud and commanded by John Williams Wilson, a British-born Chilean captain.

== Mission ==
The Ancud sailed out from Ancud on May 22, 1843. The crew were carrying supplies for the estimated seven months journey, as well as supplies to settle a colony in the Strait of Magellan. On board were 23 crew (20 men, 2 women, 1 child), of which about half would stay in the Magallanes region with the mission of establish a permanent settlement.

== From Ancud to Puerto Americano ==
They brought two lifeboats, but lost one of them during a storm south of Queitao in Guaitecas Archipelago. They called at a place known as Puerto Americano or Tangbac, where two American ships were anchored: the schooner Betzei and the brig Enterprise, both seal hunters. Williams tried unsuccessfully to buy from the Enterprise captain a boat and some nautical charts by Robert Fitz Roy, but only got a negative answer for the boat and just permission to copy the charts. They stayed in Puerto Americano until July 3 dedicated to building a boat. Meanwhile, the naturalist Bernardo Philippi was responsible for hand-copying the charts.

== Back to Ancud ==
On July 26, they tried to pass Taitao Peninsula, but bad weather, together with a failure of the rudder and a starboard crack drove them back to seek shelter again in Puerto Americano, arriving there on August 2. The next day Williams sent Miller, Philippi and five more men by boat back to Chiloé with orders to reach Dalcahue, about 300 km away, and from there travel by road about 80 km to Ancud to get supplies, the rudder repaired and inform the governor about their journey. They returned 23 days later with a boat carrying supplies.

After discovering a smuggling plot by the Enterprise, Williams ordered its captain to withdraw his ship from Puerto Americano. As he did not obey, the next day the brig was seized and Williams threatened to fire on them if they ignored the order. The Enterprise was retired from Puerto Americano to a beach nearby and the next day, when the schooner Ancud had left to continue his journey, was reported to Americans that if they were meeting them again in Chilean territory without a formal permission of local authorities they will proceed to confiscate the boat.

== Strait of Magellan ==
Continuing south, they were naming landforms that were not called out on their maps.

When they reached Punta Santa Ana in the Strait on September 21, 1843, all the crew of the schooner went ashore and took formal possession of the surrounding territory on behalf of Chile and started the process to build Fuerte Bulnes.

Before leaving to scout eastward on September 26 they left in Santa Ana a sign engraved with the words "Republic of Chile" and "Viva Chile!". After scouting the area, and having met a tribe of Tehuelches, they left the strait on 4 December to their way back.

== Replica ==
A full size replica of the ship was open to visitors in the Nao Victoria Museum in Punta Arenas, Chile.
