= Fuerte Bulnes =

Chilean fort

Coordinates: 53°37.8′S 70°55.1′W

Location of Fuerte Bulnes in Punta Santa Ana

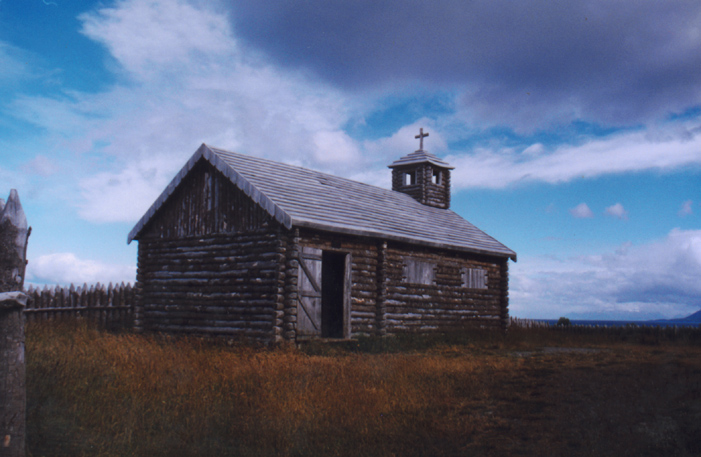
Fuerte Bulnes.

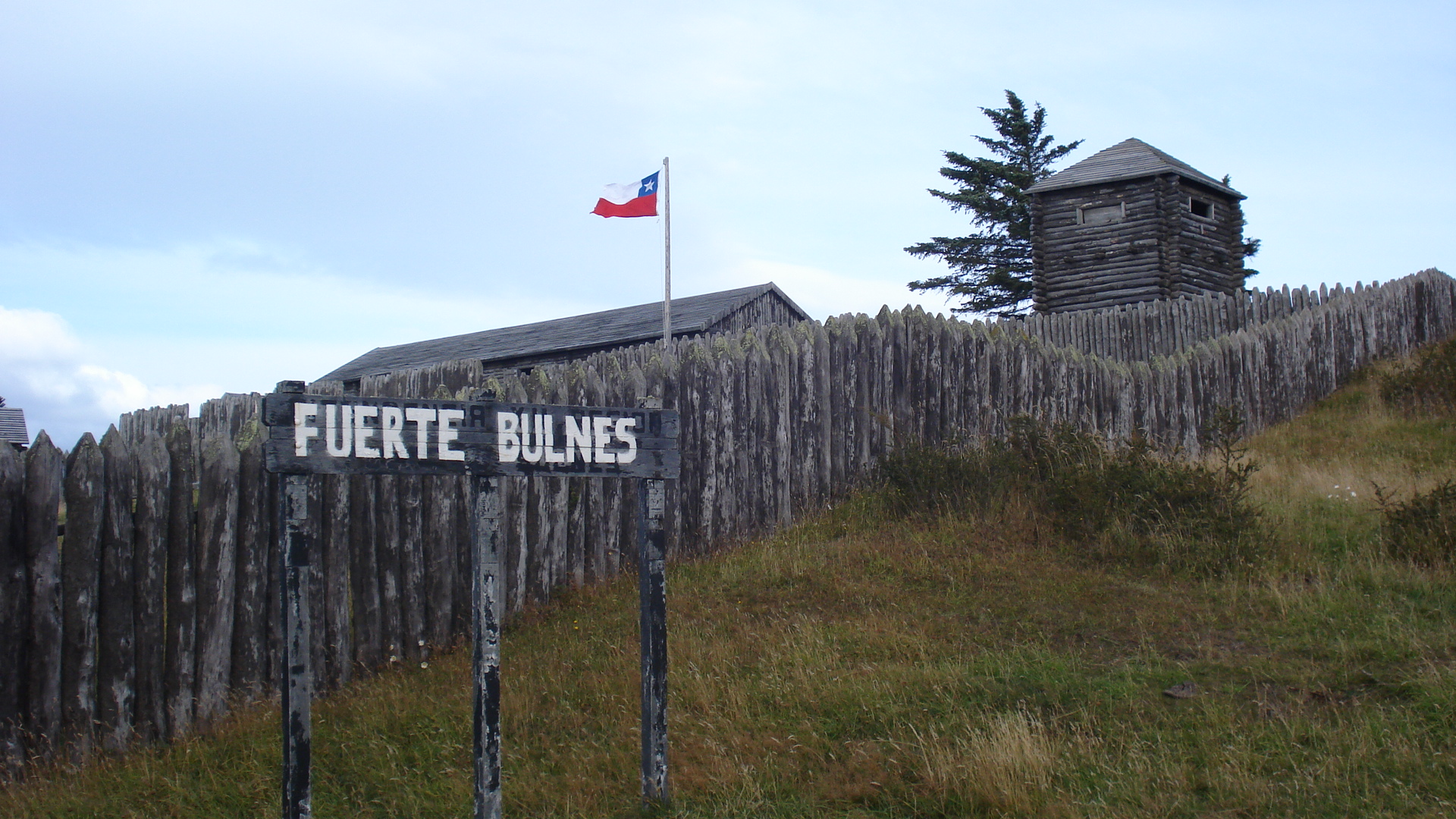
Fuerte Bulnes.

Fuerte Bulnes is a Chilean fort located by the Strait of Magellan, 62 km south of Punta Arenas. It was founded in 1843 on a rocky hill at Punta Santa Ana, and named after President Manuel Bulnes Prieto.

The fort was built to further the president's colonization policies in Southern Chile and protect the Strait of Magellan. He directed construction to ward off claims by other nations. Chiloé's intendant (governor), Domingo Espiñeira Riesco, ordered construction of a schooner to sail to that location. He originally commissioned it in the president's name, but Bulnes had the ship renamed Ancud, for where it was built.

She sailed from Ancud on May 22, 1843, under command of John Williams Wilson, a British-born Chilean Navy officer. Ancud arrived at Punta Santa Ana on September 21, 1843, about 2 km from Puerto del Hambre. Williams directed the construction of a fort here, using mainly logs and dirt and grass 'bricks'.

Although the president wanted to establish a town, the harsh weather prevented attracting a large and stable population. As a result, after six years, the local governor founded Punta Arenas in the Sandy Point area in 1848. Once people had migrated there, military forces abandoned and destroyed the fort. Lieutenant Cambiazo supervised its burning.

Between 1941 and 1943, the government directed the fort to be reconstructed as a historic monument. The replica includes the church, chaplain's quarters, jail, powder magazine, post office and stables. It was declared a national monument in 1968. Today, it is administered by a private company.
