= John Williams Wilson =

English-Chilean sailor and politician (1798–1857)

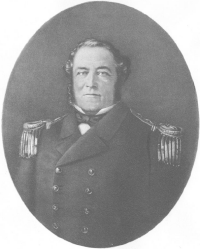
- Born: 1798; Bristol, England
- Died: 14 September 1857 (aged 58–59); Valparaíso, Chile
- Military career
- Allegiance: Chile
- Branch: Navy
- Rank: Commander

John Williams Wilson (1798 – 14 September 1857), also known as Juan Guillermos, was an English-Chilean sailor and politician. Born in Bristol, he entered the newly founded Chilean navy in 1824 and rose to the rank of commander. He was appointed governor of Talcahuano (1849–1855). He supervised construction of Fuerte Bulnes in 1843, which the government intended for a settlement at the Strait of Magellan. Puerto Williams, founded in 1953, was named for the naval commander.

== Early life, education and migration ==
John Williams Wilson was born in Bristol, England, to a family with a long seafaring tradition. He learned to sail with his father.

As a young man, he traveled to South America to enter the newly organized Chilean Navy in 1824, directed by the British Lord Cochrane. Williams was soon promoted to the rank of lieutenant. His name was Hispanicized and he was known as Juan Guillermos.

In early 1826, Williams took part in the campaign for the capture of Chiloé Archipelago from royalists. He was appointed as commander of Talcahuano. In 1827 he was promoted to lieutenant commander

== Marriage and family ==
In 1827 he also married Doña Micaela Rebolledo, born in Chile. The couple had three sons: Horacio, Luis, and Juan, and a daughter Lavinia. Juan Williams had an illustrious navy career.

== Rebellion and reinstatement, governor ==
In 1837, Williams defended General Ramón Freire Serrano after he revolted against the government of President General Joaquín Prieto Vial. For this, Williams was temporarily dismissed from the naval service. He was reinstated in 1838, and was available to fight in the second year of the war against the Peru-Bolivian Confederation.

A few years later Williams was appointed navy commander and Maritime Governor of Chiloé. In 1843 Don Manuel Bulnes Prieto, the President of the Republic, ordered him to mount a naval expedition to Magallanes. After building a fifty-ton, two-gun, schooner called Ancud in a location near Ancud, Commander Williams sailed to the Straits of Magellan, arriving on September 21, 1843 at Puerto San Felipe (Port Famine). He took possession of the Strait of Magellan and adjacent territories on behalf of the Republic of Chile, incorporating them into national territory.

The next day the French schooner Phaeton put in and, after saluting the Chilean flag, departed for Oceania. Williams supervised the construction of Fuerte Bulnes here to secure the Strait. The government intended to develop a settlement, but the location was too isolated, and the population was later moved to Punta Arenas. After being destroyed at the time to prevent other uses, the fort was reconstructed in the 20th century and is designated as a national monument.

As a reward for his service, Williams was appointed as governor of Talcahuano (1849–1855).

He died at age 59 in Valparaíso on 14 September 1857.

== Legacy and honours ==
- The town of Puerto Williams on Isla Navarino, founded in 1953 as a navy base, is named after him.
- Juan Guillermos Island is named for him.
- The satyrine butterfly Stuardosatyrus williamsianus (Butler, 1868) is named for him as well.
