= Battle of Bellavista =

- Part of the Chilean War of Independence
Date	January 14, 1826
Location	Ancud, Chiloé Island; 41°52′34″S 73°49′17″W
Result	Chilean victory Chiloe annexed to the Republic of Chile

Belligerents
Republic of Chile	(Spain) Chiloé royalists

Commanders and leaders
(Chile) José Manuel Borgoño	(Spain) Antonio de Quintanilla

Strength
2,575 soldiers 4 pieces of artillery	1,852 soldiers 6 pieces of artillery

Casualties and losses
92 killed 76 wounded	296 killed and wounded

Battle of Bellavista was the final confrontation of the Chilean 1826 campaign to successfully dislodge the Royalists from Chiloé Archipelago.

== The battle ==
On January 13 Chilean forces were able to capture three small gun boats from the Royalists in Ancud in the Battle of Pudeto. The battle of Bellavista began in the morning of January 14 with a Chilean advance on Ancud. In face of this and because of the fire by naval and land-based artillery, the Royalist troops retreated into the Fort of San Carlos. As the Chileans began to surround the Spanish positions, Quintanilla ordered a retreat to the heights of Bellavista where he hoped to put up some resistance. However, the demoralised Royalist troops were not in the mood to fight, so by late evening Quintanilla ordered a retreat south along the road to Castro. Agüi Fort on the Lacuy Peninsula surrendered on January 15.

Quintanilla capitulated on January 18 after negotiating the conditions. The Treaty of Tantauco was signed, and the Chiloé archipelago came under Chilean sovereignty.
