= Spanish colonization attempt of the Strait of Magellan =

Two late 16th century failed colonies

Location of Spanish settlements in the Strait of Magellan shown with green dots. The sound of Primera Angostura is shown with a blue dot. Modern boundaries between Chile and Argentina are shown.

In the late 16th century, the Spanish Empire attempted to settle the Strait of Magellan with the aim of controlling the only known passage between the Atlantic and Pacific oceans at that time. The project was a direct response to Francis Drake's unexpected entry into the Pacific through the strait in 1578 and the subsequent havoc his men wreaked upon the Pacific coast of Spanish America. The colonization effort took the form of a naval expedition led by veteran explorer Pedro Sarmiento de Gamboa, which set sail from Cádiz in December 1581. The expedition established two short-lived settlements in the strait, Nombre de Jesús and Ciudad del Rey Don Felipe. However, the settlers proved poorly prepared for the cool and windy environment of the strait, and starvation and disease was soon rampant. A resupply expedition organized by Sarmiento in Rio de Janeiro in 1585 was unable to reach the strait due to unfavorable weather. Aid to the struggling colony was later hampered by Sarmiento falling prisoner to English corsairs in 1586 and the unresponsiveness of King Philip II, likely due to the strain of Spain's resources caused by the wars with England and Dutch rebels. The last known survivor was rescued by a passing ship in 1590.

Later, when it became evident that alternative routes to the Strait of Magellan existed south of Tierra del Fuego, the Spanish authorities abandoned their plans of settling the strait.

== Background ==
1570 map by Abraham Ortelius depicting the Strait of Magellan and a then hypothetical Northwest Passage as the only passages between the Atlantic and Pacific oceans.

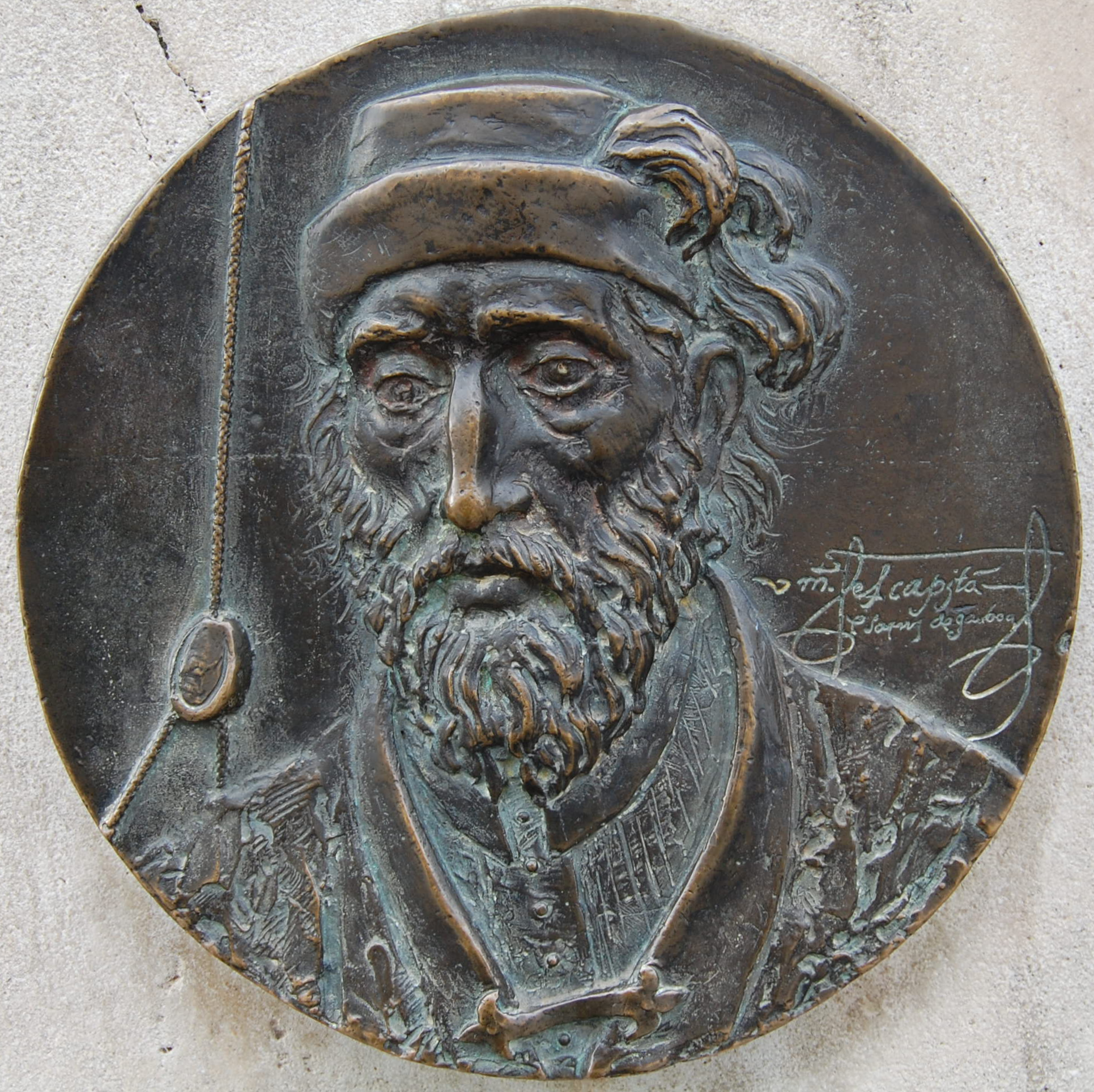
Plaque commemorating Pedro Sarmiento de Gamboa in Alcalá de Henares.

16th-century explorers and Spanish authorities had differing views on the Strait of Magellan. Antonio Pigafetta understood his voyage through the area with Magellan as an unrepeatable feat, yet others in Europe saw it instead as an opportunity and a strategic location to facilitate long-range trade. In Pigafetta's account he described the strait as a hospitable area with many good ports, "cedar" wood, and abundant shellfish and fish. Conquistador Pedro de Valdivia is known at one point to have considered the strait a threat as he feared that rival conquistadores would arrive by it to challenge his claims to Chile. Later when Valdivia had consolidated his claims he showed interest in it as a way to link his colony directly to Seville. Valdivia sent two maritime expeditions from Chile to explore the strait, first Juan Bautista Pastene in the spring of 1544 and Francisco de Ulloa in the summer of 1553–1554. In 1552 Valdivia sent Francisco de Villagra on mission to reach the Strait of Magellan by land. He was first to cross the Andes from the Spanish cities in Chile, then reach the Atlantic coast and follow it south until finding the strait. Villagra and his men reached however only as far as Limay River. Valdivia's successor García Hurtado de Mendoza sent yet another maritime expedition to the strait led by Juan Ladrillero in the summer of 1557–1558.

The Strait of Magellan was never reached by the land-based Spanish colonization of South America as southward expansion halted after the conquest of the Chiloé Archipelago in 1567. The Spanish are thought to have lacked incentives for further conquests south: the indigenous populations were sparse and did not engage in the sedentary agricultural life of the Spanish.

Through the 16th and 17th centuries, Spain considered the Pacific Ocean a Mare clausum – a sea closed to other naval powers. In 1578 English navigator Francis Drake entered the Pacific Ocean by crossing the strait, effectively inaugurating an era of privateering and piracy along the coasts of Chile. News of Drake's exploits created fear and feelings of uncertainty in Spanish America's Pacific settlements. Responding to this emergent threat the Viceroy of Peru, Francisco de Toledo, sent a squadron with two ships under Pedro Sarmiento de Gamboa in order to explore the feasibility of fortifying it and by virtue of that controlling the entrance to the Pacific Ocean from the Atlantic. Pedro de Gamboa's expedition explored the strait, trying to ferret out English invaders, while surveying locations for future fortifications.

== Colonization attempt ==
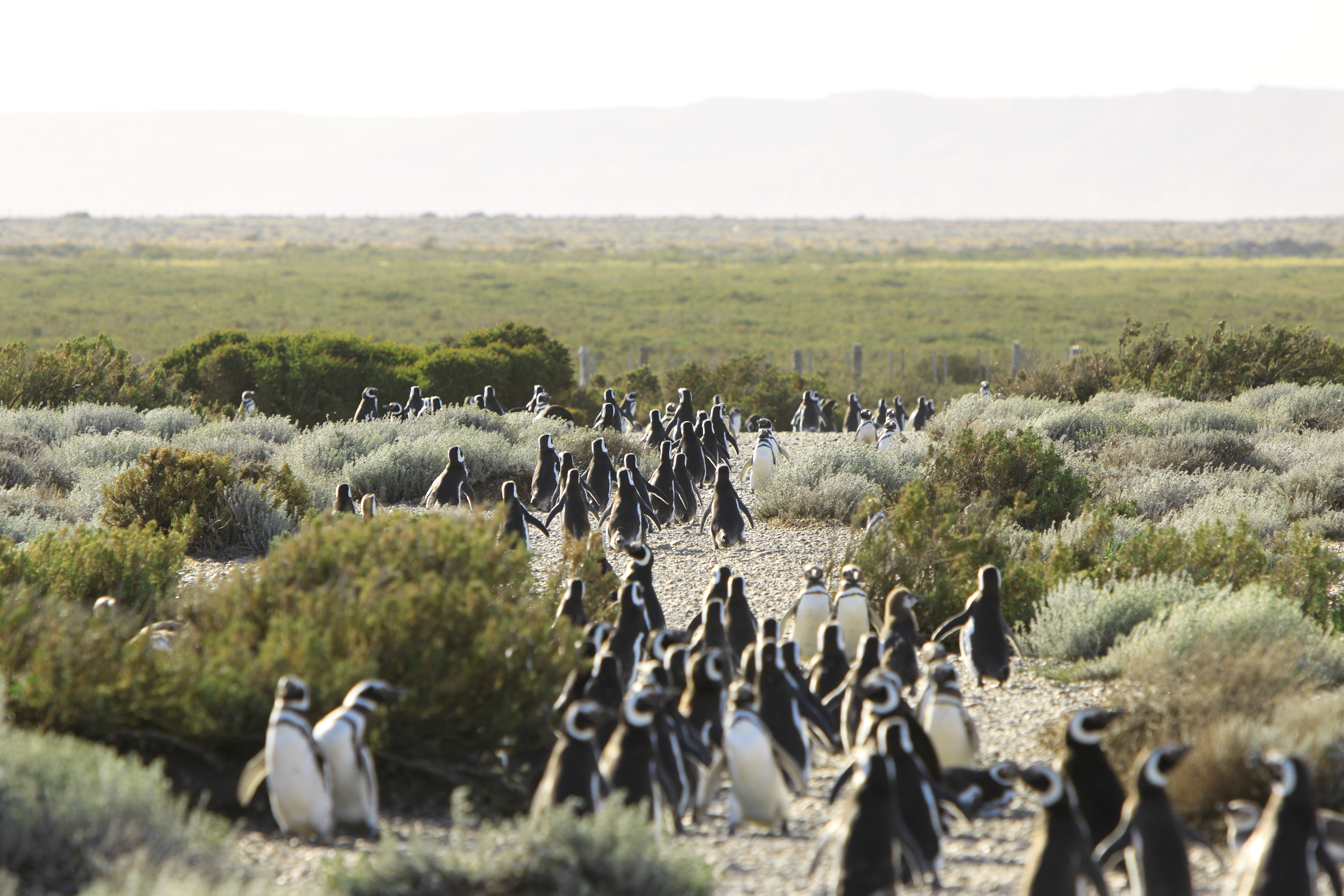
Magellanic penguin colony with the archeological site of Nombre de Jesús in the background

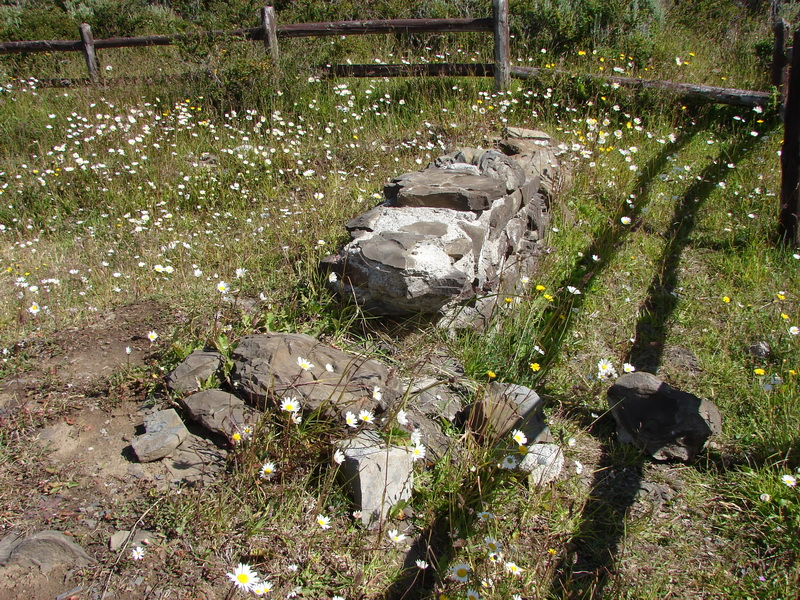
Ruins of the church built by the settlers in Ciudad Rey Don Felipe in 1584.

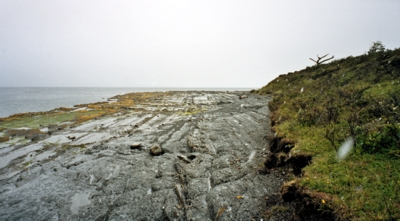
The coast near Ciudad del Rey Don Felipe as seen in the mid to early 2000s.

After surveying the strait, Sarmiento departed to Spain and obtained there through the King ships and settlers for a definitive colonization and fortifying project. The Duke of Alba supported the project and suggested some modifications. The plan included building one fort on each side of Primera Angostura, a sound within the strait. Italian military engineer Giovanni Battista Antonelli participated in the design of the fortifications. The location at Primera Angostura was however later discarded because the tide there would aid ships in crossing the narrow passage. The expedition that sailed from Spain included about 350 settlers and 400 soldiers.

Back in the Strait of Magellan Sarmiento founded the city of Nombre de Jesús at its Atlantic entrance on 11 February 1584. On the night of 17 February, a group led by the officials Diego de la Rivera and Antón Pablos abandoned the remaining of the expedition secretly by night taking with them the three best ships and most of the supplies. In Nombre de Jesús Sarmiento left Antonio de Biedma in charge while he left with a party on foot to follow the northern shore of the strait. On 23 March Sarmiento's party reached a bay with favourable conditions where they founded the city of Ciudad del Rey Don Felipe two days later. Ciudad del Rey Don Felipe was built to have plenty of wooden buildings such as a church, town hall, royal magazine, a Franciscan convent and a clergy house.

Settlers were ill-prepared, they were chiefly from Andalusia whose Mediterranean climate differed from the one of wind-swept Patagonia. The settlements had been expected to be self-sufficient but the growing of plants the Spanish had brought with them proved difficult. Instead, settlers developed a diet of shellfish and canelo ("cinnamon") bark.

Nombre de Jesús was abandoned after only five months of existence and its population sought themselves to Ciudad del Rey Don Felipe. There, realizing there was not enough food for all, Andrés de Biedma ordered the people to scatter along the northern coast of the strait and wait for any vessel that could provide aid. Sarmiento's resupply expedition never arrived at the straits due to a storm. In the winter of 1584, amidst starvation and disease, the settlers led by Biedma made an attempt to evacuate some settlers in two vessels constructed for that purpose, however, the attempt was aborted when one of these small ships foundered at near Cape San Isidro, 20 km south of Ciudad Rey Don Felipe. Biedma maintained a harsh discipline amongst the settlers, recurrently executing settlers by hanging.

When the next English navigator, Thomas Cavendish, landed at the site of Ciudad Rey Don Felipe in 1587, he found the ruins of the settlement as well as a handful of survivors whom he refused to assist. He removed six cannons from the settlement and renamed the place "Port Famine."

The last known survivor was rescued in 1590 by Andrew Merrick, captain of the Delight, the only one of five vessels to reach the strait from an expedition organized by another English corsair, John Childley.

=== Reasons for the failure ===
Cavendish praised the location of Ciudad Rey Don Felipe as being in the "best place of the strait". In 1837 the French expedition led by Jules Dumont d'Urville surveyed the area. Dumont accurately inferred the location of Ciudad Rey Don Felipe taking note of its favourable geographical conditions.

Disease, executions, brawls, and violent encounters with indigenous peoples are all possible causes for the high death rates. Diseases, in particular, are thought to have been rampant among settlers. Deeper contributing causes for failure of the settlement and death of most settlers may have been the poor mood settlers showed already from the beginning of the settlement. This mood can in part be explained by a series of difficulties the expedition had to go through between the departure from Spain and the arrival to the strait.

King Philip II's inaction despite repeated appeals by Sarmiento to aid the ailing colony was likely due to the strain on Spain's resources that resulted from wars with England and Dutch rebels.

Historian Mateo Martinic has called the settlement attempt "the most unfortunate chapter of human history in the Strait of Magellan".

== Aftermath ==
Proposals to settle the strait were raised again in Spanish courts in 1671 in connection to John Narborough's expedition to Chile. Rumours of a foreign settlement in Patagonia resurfaced in 1676 when claims that England was preparing an expedition to settle the Strait of Magellan reached the Spanish courts. A proposal to settle the strait was raised yet again in 1702 by the Governor of Chile Francisco Ibáñez de Peralta. In this last proposal, the Captaincy General of Chile would itself finance the settlement with the Real Situado with the sole condition that these payments begin to arrive on time. However the Spanish failure to settle the Strait of Magellan in the 1580s was so notorious that its precedent ruled out any attempt to settle the strait for centuries to come.

The failure of settling the strait made the Chiloé Archipelago key in protecting western Patagonia from foreign intrusions. The city of Valdivia, reestablished in 1645, and Chiloé acted as sentries, and as hubs where the Spanish collected intelligence from all over Patagonia.

== See also ==
- Antonio de Vea expedition
- Chilean colonization of the Strait of Magellan
- Coastal defence of colonial Chile
- Coastal fortifications of colonial Chile
- García de Nodal expedition

== Sources ==
- Martinic, Mateo (1977). Historia del Estrecho de Magallanes (in Spanish). Santiago: Andrés Bello.
- Spate, Oskar Hermann Khristian (2004). The Spanish Lake. Volume 1 of Pacific since Magellan. ANU E Press. ISBN 9781920942168.
