= Coastal fortifications of colonial Chile =

Colonial Times in Spanish Empire

Map with places that were fortified at some point during colonial times. Blue dots mark locations first fortified in the 17th century or before. Green dots marks paces first fortified in the 18th century.

In Colonial times the Spanish Empire diverted significant resources to fortify the Chilean coast to defend against Dutch and British raids. During the 16th century the Spanish strategy was to complement the fortification work in its Caribbean ports with forts in the Strait of Magellan. As attempts at settling and fortifying the Strait of Magellan were abandoned the Spanish began to fortify the Captaincy General of Chile and other parts of the west coast of the Americas. The coastal fortifications and defense system was at its peak in the mid-18th century.

== History ==
=== 16th century ===
In 1578 Francis Drake inaugurated an era of privateering and piracy along the coasts of Chile. Responding to this threat the viceroy of Peru sent in 1579 an expedition commanded by Pedro Sarmiento de Gamboa to the Strait of Magellan in order to explore the feasibility of fortifying it and by virtue of that controlling the entrance to the Pacific Ocean from the Atlantic. After surveying the strait Sarmiento departed to Spain and obtained there through the king ships and settlers for a definitive colonization and fortifying project. Duke of Alba supported the project and suggested some modifications. The plan included the building one fort on each side of Primera Angostura, a sound within the strait. The expedition that sailed from Spain included about 350 settlers and 400 soldiers. Back in the Strait of Magellan Sarmiento founded the cities of Nombre de Jesús and Ciudad del Rey Don Felipe in 1584. Nombre de Jesús was abandoned after only five months of existence and its population sought themselves to Ciudad del Rey Don Felipe. There, realizing there was not enough food for all, Andrés de Biedma ordered the people to scatter along the northern coast of the strait and wait for any vessel that could provide aid. Sarmiento's resupply expedition never did arrive at the straits, this was due to a storm and only a few settlers survived to be rescued by other navigators.

=== 17th century ===
In 1600 local Huilliche joined the Dutch corsair Baltazar de Cordes to attack the Spanish settlement of Castro. While this was a sporadic attack the Spanish believed the Dutch could attempt to ally the Mapuches and establish a stronghold in southern Chile. The Spanish knew of the Dutch plans to establish themselves at the ruins of Valdivia so they attempted to re-establish Spanish rule there before the Dutch arrived again. The Spanish attempts were thwarted during the 1630s when Mapuches did not allow the Spanish to pass by their territory. With the Spanish blocked from entering Valdivia via land the much waited Dutch invasion met no resistance when it reached the ruins of old Spanish city in August 1643. Before that the Dutch did however engage the Spanish at Carelmapu and sacked Castro. The Spanish in these two localities had been instructed to use a scorched earth strategy against the incoming invaders. While the Dutch abandoned their new colony after only two months in October 1643, their invasion caused great alarm among Spanish authorities and triggered the return of the Spanish to Valdivia. The construction of the Valdivian Fort System began in 1645. Having heard from a letter to Juan Manqueante that the Dutch had plans to return to the location, the Spanish viceroy in Peru sent from El Callao in Peru 1000 men in twenty ships and ordered 2000 men to march by land from Central Chile in 1644 to resettle Valdivia and fortify it. The land troops never made it to Valdivia, probably due to Mapuche resistance. The massive fleet, that added two ships in Chile, was unprecedented in the region. The building and maintenance of the Valdivian Fort System became a burden for the Spanish colonial finances, more so considering that the Dutch did not return to establish their planned colony.

=== 18th century ===
Ever since the Bourbon dynasty assumed power in Spain during the early 18th century the threat of a French attack dissipated, instead the British seemed to be the foremost menace to Spains possessions in Chile. The War of Jenkins' Ear between Britain and Spain caused the British to plan an attack against the Spanish possessions in Chile. Valdivia, a fortified and valuable Spanish exclave, was selected for an attack. The attack to be commanded by George Anson proved a complete failure even before the expedition reached Spanish ports: the ships had dispersed and HMS Wager wrecked off the coast of Patagonia. Nevertheless, the British arrival caused great alarm among the Spanish who searched extensively the Patagonian archipelagoes to cleanse it from any possible British presence.

The coastal city of La Serena in northern Chile was first fortified in the 1730s, about fifty years after it was sacked and torched by the pirate Bartholomew Sharp. By 1805 the city defenses, including a series of batteries, were in a state of abandonment.

In the 1740s the viceroy of Peru and the governor of Chile converged in a project to advance the frontiers of the Spanish Empire in the Southeast Pacific and prevent the establishment of a British base. As result of this plan the Juan Fernández Islands were settled and the fort of Tenquehuen established in Chonos Archipelago near Taitao Peninsula. This last fort was manned for one and half year before being abandoned. After the Tenquehuen fort was dismantled the Marquis of the Ensenada, being briefed on local affairs, recommended the establishment of a fort in the Guaitecas Archipelago, but this never happened. For Governor Antonio Narciso de Santa María, Chiloé Island was the most important part of the Patagonian Archipelago recommending to concentrate on the defense of Chiloé. It was the hope of the Spanish that when the supposed British return occurred they would find the Juan Fernández Islands fortified and settled.

As consequence of the Seven Years' War the Valdivian Fort System was updated and reinforced from 1764 onwards. Other vulnerable localities of colonial Chile such as Chiloé Archipelago, Concepción, Juan Fernández Islands and Valparaíso were also made ready for possible British attacks. Inspired in the recommendations of former governor Santa María the Spanish founded the "city-fort" of Ancud in 1768 and separated Chiloé from the Captaincy General of Chile into a direct dependency of the Viceroyalty of Peru. As with other 18th-century forts in Chile the establishment of Ancud caused through the new Ancud-Castro road an expansion of local trade and agriculture.

Fortification engineers building 18th century forts imprinted neoclassical designs on them.

=== 19th century ===
A varied list of 18th-century and early 19th-century authors in Chile, Spain and the rest of Europe concurred on the strategic importance of Valdivia and its harbour. A notable dissident was the Governor of Osorno Juan Mackenna who argued in an 1810 report for diminishing the size of the garrison protecting Valdivia and distribute resources aimed at it elsewhere. This report was rebuked by Manuel Olaguer Feliú, the chief military engineer involved in the designs of the defences of Valdivia. Mackenna's thesis that controlling fortified positions was unnecessary to conquer a territory was contradicted both by the experiences of the Peninsular War and by Cochrane's decision to attack the Valdivia Fort System itself in 1820. According to historian Gabriel Guarda Mackenna was more concerned about controlling resources than of providing valid arguments.

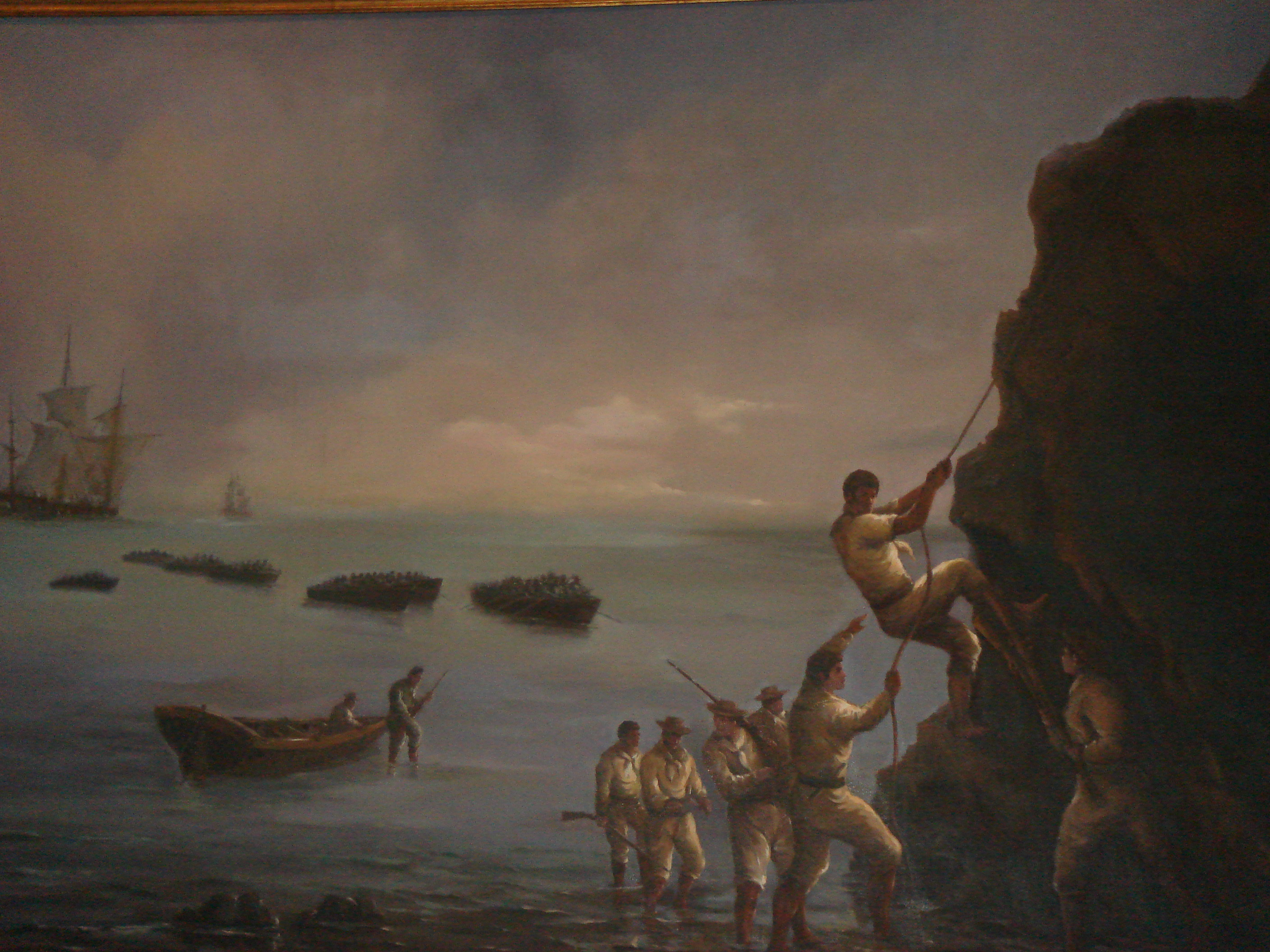
A painting on the landings of Thomas Cochrane previous to the rebel assault on the Valdivian Fort System.

During the War of Chilean Independence several coastal fortifications were attacked. The First Chilean Navy Squadron, commanded by Thomas Cochrane, launched an amphibious attack on the Valdivian Fort System in 1820. The land troops led by Jorge Beauchef overran the forts on the southern side of Corral Bay. Then the remaining forts, in Niebla and Mancera Island were abandoned by the Spaniards who retreated to the city of Valdivia.

== List of fortifications ==
Picture	Locality	Coordinates	Date of building and updates	Designer(s)
	Castillo de San Antonio			
	Fuerte de Penco		1684 (Note: 1684 is the most likely date of creation of this 17th century fort.)	
	Castillo de San Clemente		1596	
	Fuerte San Agustín		1777	Leandro Badarán
	Fuerte Gálvez		1780	Leandro Badarán
	Valdivian Fort System	39.866667°S 73.433333°W	1645, 1661, 1671, 1679, 1680, 1764, 1765, 1767	Juan de Buitrón y Mujica; Constantino Vasconcelos; José Antonio Birt; Juan Garland
	Carelmapu Fort System	41°45′3.66″S 73°42′27.90″W	1603, 1720	
	Lacui Fort System	41.829167°S 73.351944°W	1768, 1779	Miguel de Zorrilla; Carlos de Beranger y Renaud
	Ancud Fort System	41.861667°S 73.8275°W	1767 or 1768, 1824	Carlos de Beranger y Renaud
	Chacao Fort System	41°49′16.08″S 73°31′8.52″W		
	Castro Fort System	42°33′7.64″S 73°45′3.87″W		
	Fuerte Tenquehuen	45.65°S 74.8°W	1750	

== Bibliography ==
- Bengoa, José (2003). Historia de los antiguos mapuches del sur (in Spanish). Santiago: Catalonia. ISBN 956-8303-02-2.
- Lane, Kris E. (1998). Pillageing the Empire: Piracy in the Americas 1500–1750. ISBN 9780765630834.
