= Battle of Pudeto =

Battle of Puedto
- Part of the Chilean War of Independence
Date	January 13, 1826
Location	Pudeto River, near Ancud, Chiloé Island; 41°54′42″S 73°45′15″W
Result	Patriot victory

Belligerents
Republic of Chile	(Spain) Chiloé royalists

Commanders and leaders
(Chile) Guillermo Bell	(Spain) Antonio de Quintanilla

Casualties and losses
1 dead and 10 wounded	3 gunboats

Battle of Pudeto was an attack by Chilean patriot forces during the 1826 campaign on the Spanish stronghold of Chiloé in southern Chile.

== The Battle ==
After landing on the northern coast of Chiloé Island, Supreme Director Ramón Freire planned a direct assault led by Jorge Beauchef on enemy positions during the night. Manuel Blanco Encalada and José Manuel Borgoño successfully convinced Freire to instead attempt to weaken the royalists and presented a plan to capture three small gunboats. Freire conceded and Guillermo Bell was chosen for the task. Bell was able to successfully capture the gunboats despite being next to the fort of San Carlos.

=== Consequences ===
After eliminating the problem of the gunboats, the Chilean patriots could attack the battery of Poquillihue, to the west of Fort San Carlos, which was now undefended for the sea. The patriots under the command of Ramón Freire and Blanco Encalada would attack the enemy from behind, using the same boats captured from the Royalists, managing to disrupt the defense in the fort and definitively defeat the royalists in the Battle of Bellavista, the next day on January 14.
