= Chiloé railway =

Railway on Chiloé Island, Chile

Chiloe railway
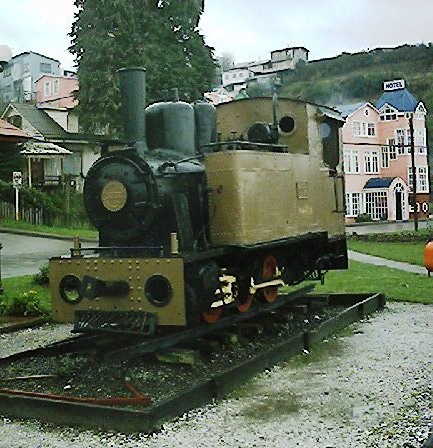
- Plazuela del Tren (Train Square), Castro

Overview
- Native name: Ferrocarril de Chiloé
- Termini: Ancud; Castro
- Stations: 12

History
- Work began: 1909
- Opened: 1912
- Closed: 1960

Technical
- Track length: 96.8 km (60.1 mi)
- Track gauge: 600 mm (1 ft 11 5/8 in) (Narrow-gauge)
- Route availability: Defunct

The Chiloe railway was a narrow-gauge railway in Chiloé Island (Chile), running from the city of Ancud to Castro that operated between 1912 and 1960. It also had a loading spur to the old port of Lechagua.

== History ==
=== Construction ===
Until before of the construction of the railway, the only land route between Ancud and Castro – the two main cities of the island – was the old Caicumeo Road, opened at the end of the 18th century.

The first time that the idea of building a railway in Chiloé was mentioned is during the year 1899, when it was proposed by senator Ramón Rozas. However, the idea was rejected as too costly.

=== Operation ===
During the first years of its opening, the trip between Ancud and Castro took about 5 hours. Derailments were common as due to a lack of railway experience on the island. The original stations of the main line, as listed by Luis Mansilla Vidal in 1914, were the following:

- Ancud
- Pupelde
- Coquiao
- Puntra
- Butalcura
- Mocopulli
- Pidpid
- Castro

Three stations were constructed later: Piruquina (between Mocopulli and Pidpid), Llaullao (between Tenten and Pidpid) and Tenten (between Llaullao and Castro).

The railroad was laid to the very narrow gauge of 600 millimetres (2 ft) gauge. Three bridges (San Antonio, Puntra and Butalcura) and fifteen viaducts were needed. On the branch to Lechagua a 152 metres (499 ft) dock was built. This was conceived as the starting point of a large port complex.

It was initially planned to extend the railway to Quellón, and construct a branch from Mocopulli to Dalcahue., but these projects were not done.

=== Closure ===
The track was severely damaged by the 1960 Valdivia earthquake, with part of it sinking under water and several of the bridges destroyed. At the same time, road construction made the reconstruction of the railway uncompetitive. The railway was not repaired and services never resumed.

== Conservation and posterity ==
In 2008 the documentary "El Camahueto de Hierro" was filmed, which preserves for posterity the history of this railway.

On 24 August 2016, the National Monuments Council approved an application to declare a group of railway properties belonging to the defunct Chiloé railway as a National Monument. These are the former Ancud Station, the Butalcura Bridge in Dalcahue and Locomotive 5057 in Castro.

== Gallery ==
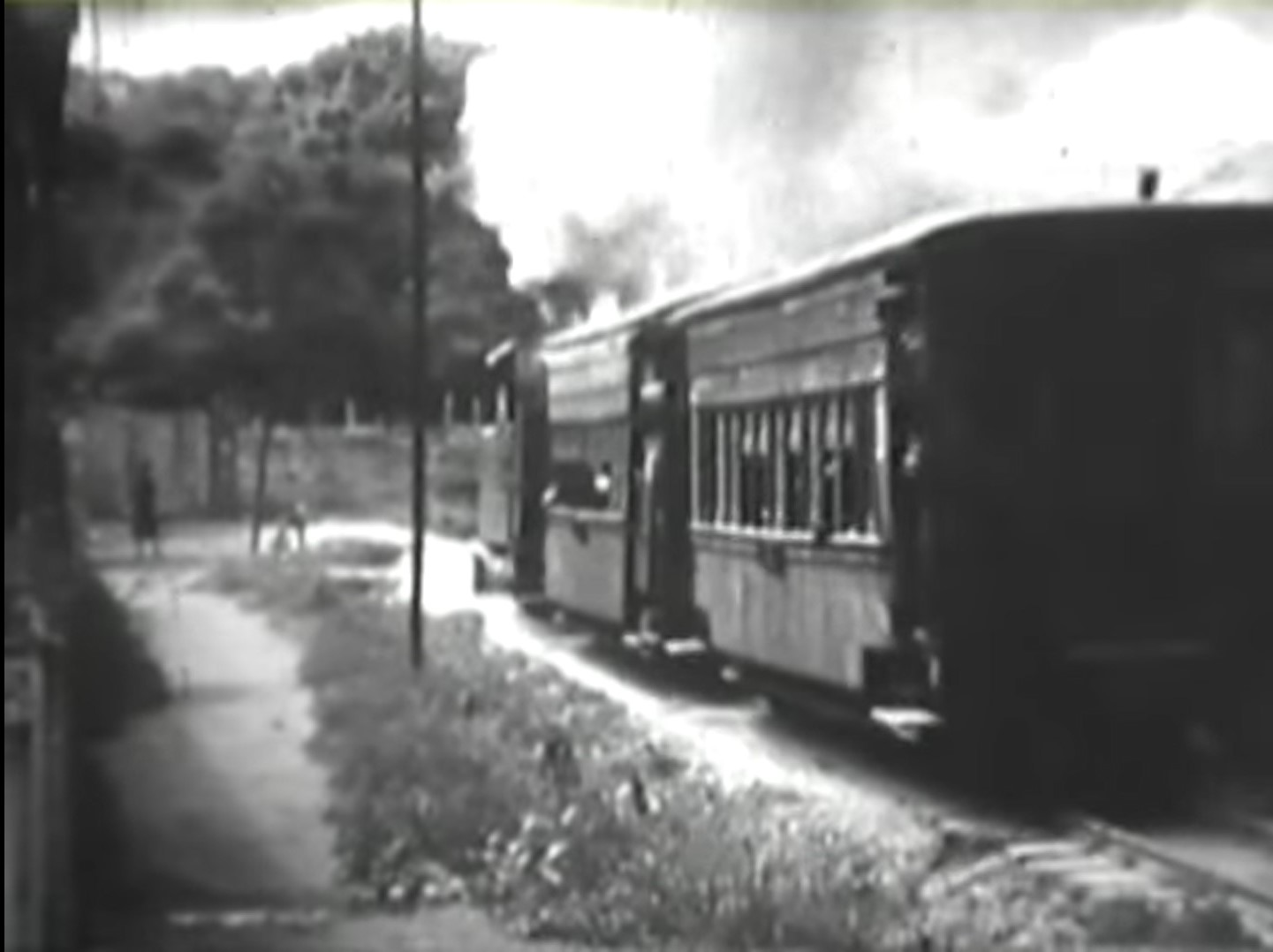
Passenger train

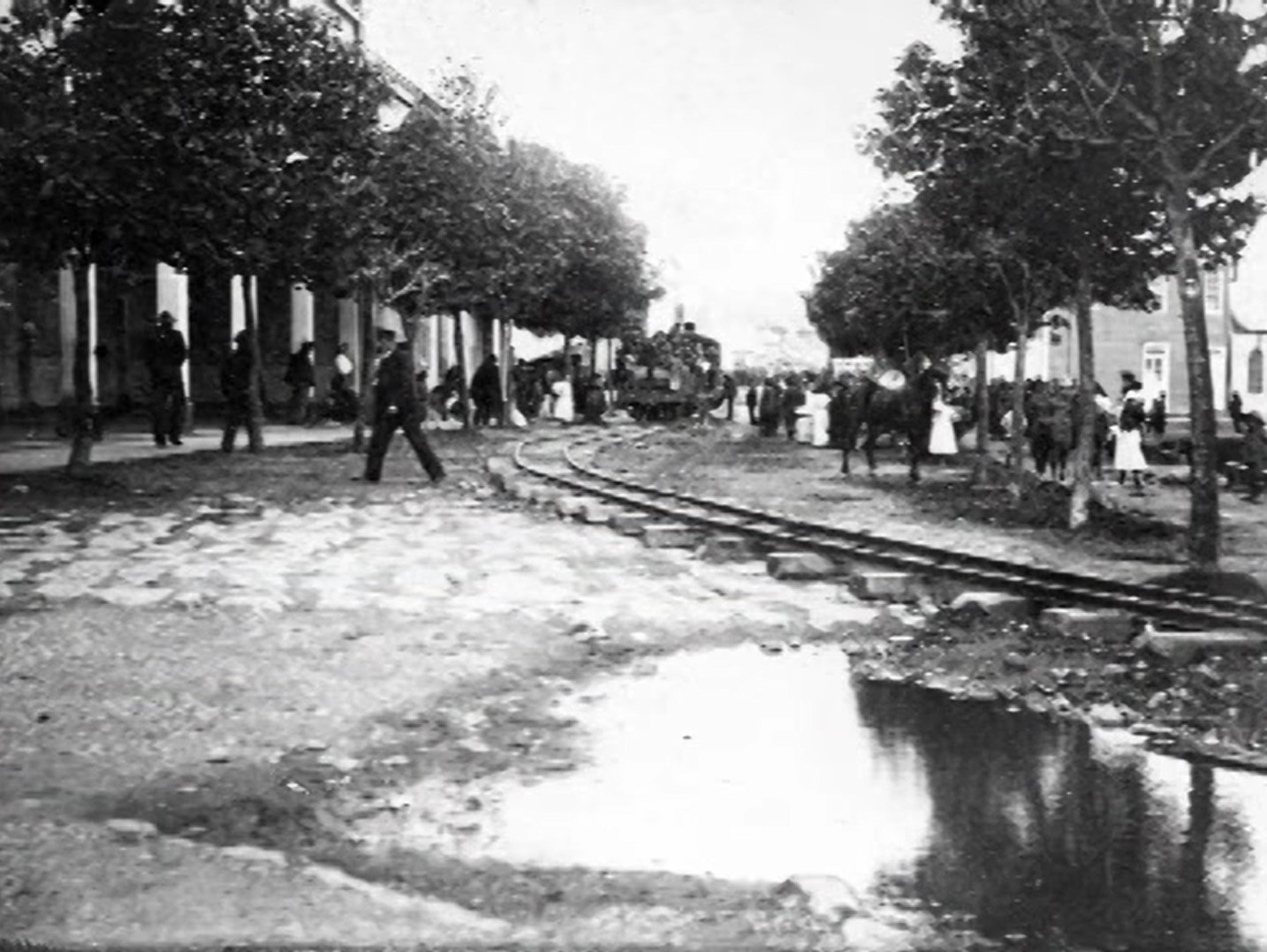
Construction

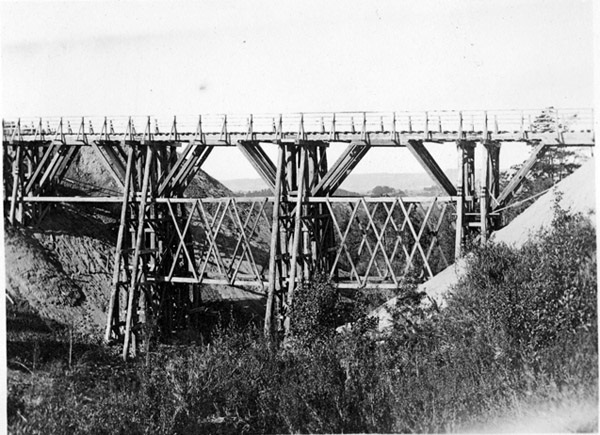
Bridge

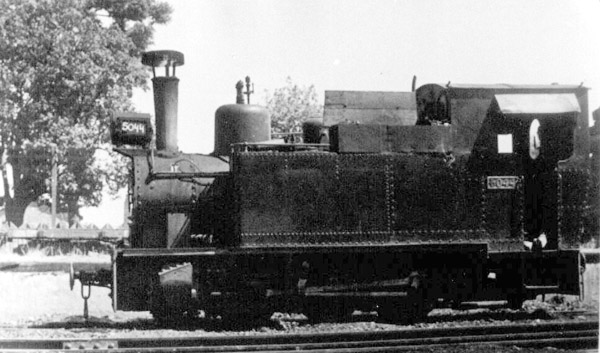
Steam locomotive n°5044

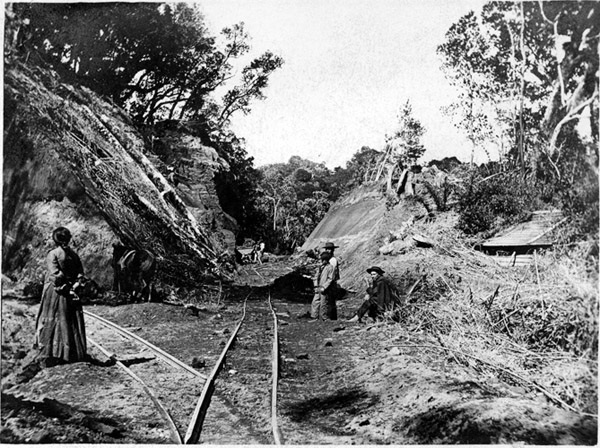
Insicion

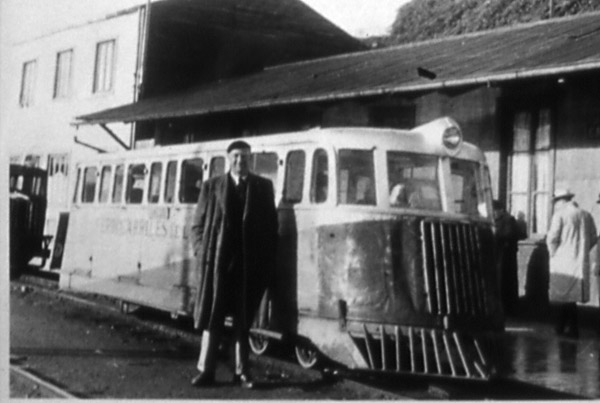
Railbus at Castro station

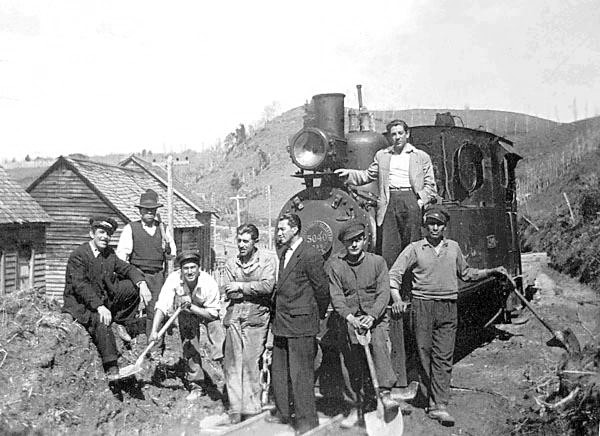
Group photo

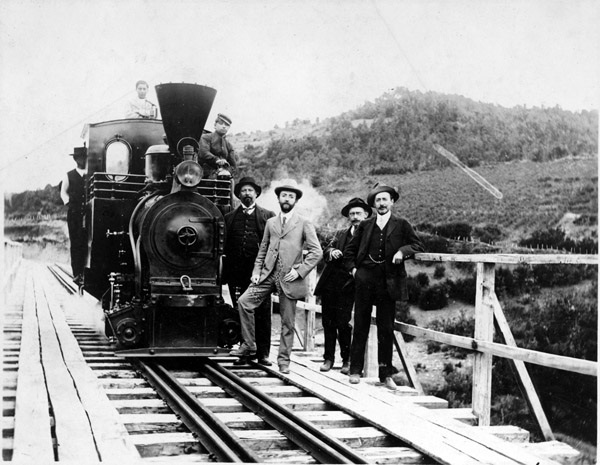
Group photo

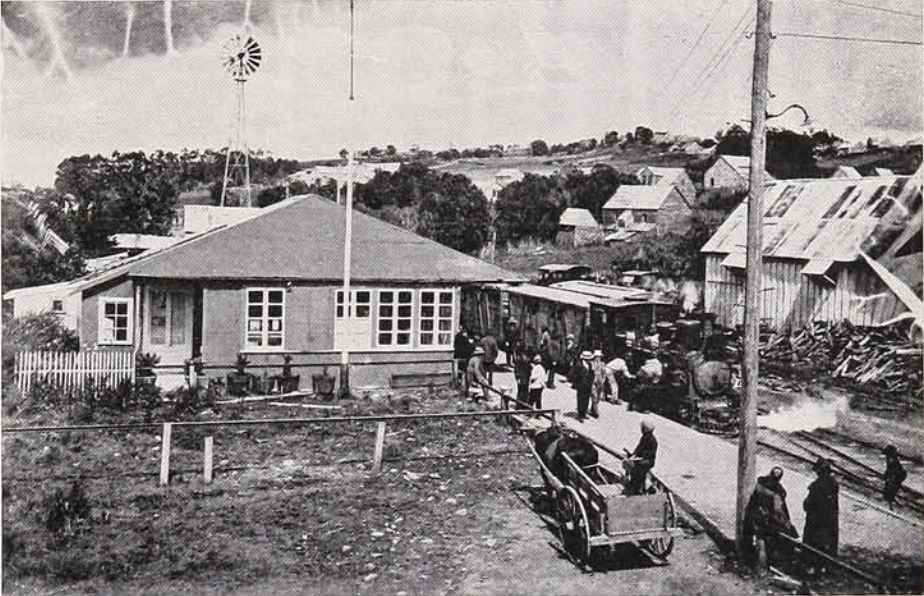
Ancud Station
