= Inío, Chile =

Village in Chile

Inío, meaning "seashore" in the Huilliche language, is a village at the southernmost tip of Chiloé Island, within the Los Lagos Region of southern Chile. Until 2013, it was accessible only by a six-hour motorboat ride from Quellón. In 2013, an airstrip was constructed allowing for short local flights, cutting access time from Quellón to 18 minutes. The village lies near Tantauco Park, a large private nature reserve.

== Geography and location ==
Inío is situated at the southernmost tip of Chiloé Island, within the Los Lagos Region of southern Chile. The village is part of the commune of Quellón and lies within the boundaries of Tantauco Park, a large private nature reserve covering approximately 118,000 hectares. Due to its remote location, Inío is considered one of the most isolated settlements on the island.

The area surrounding Inío is characterized by dense temperate rainforest, featuring ancient trees and a rich biodiversity. The forest is home to at least 15 native tree species, including coigües and mañios. The region also supports a wide range of wildlife, such as blue whales, Chilote foxes, and pudu.

Tantauco Park offers opportunities for ecotourism, including camping and trekking on a network of trails that traverse its varied landscapes. Since its establishment, the park has received increasing numbers of visitors, primarily domestic tourists, with a strong emphasis on environmental education and nature conservation.

The name Inío means "seashore" in the Huilliche language.

== Airstrip and connectivity ==
In 2023, a small airstrip was constructed in Inío, allowing for short local flights for the first time. This development significantly improved accessibility to and from the area, which had previously been reachable only by a six-hour motorboat journey from Quellón and lacked both land routes and public maritime transport.

The airstrip project required an investment of 200 million Chilean pesos and features a 600-meter long and 36-meter wide dirt runway certified by the Chilean Directorate General of Civil Aviation. The strip is capable of accommodating aircraft up to 5,750 kilograms, such as the Cessna 208 Caravan or De Havilland Twin Otter, models commonly used in remote regions like the Juan Fernández Archipelago. The construction was logistically complex due to the swampy terrain and the need to transport heavy machinery by barge from Quellón.

The new air connection had a transformative impact on the community of approximately 300 residents. It allows them to reach the town of Castro in approximately 30 minutes and Quellón in around 18 minutes by air. These distances previously took hours or were sometimes impassable due to adverse weather. Local residents view the airstrip as a lifeline, highlighting the medical and emotional importance of rapid transport.

The first regular aircraft to use the new facility was a Cessna 206, and flights are used primarily for essential travel, including medical appointments and bureaucratic tasks.
