= Mahlon Williamson =

Sailor of Wilmington

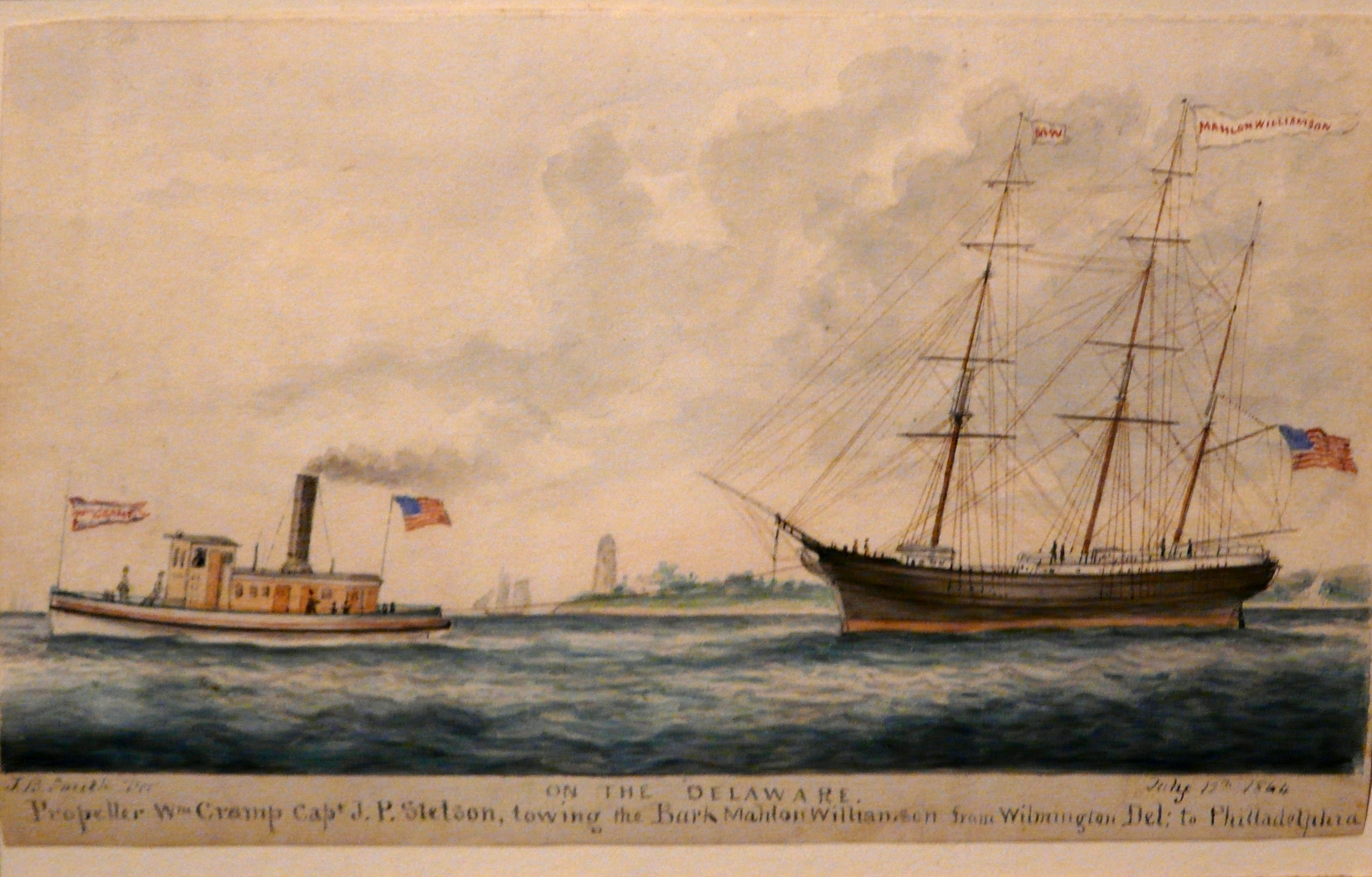
- Mahlon Williamson being towed on the Delaware River by tugboat William Cramp

History

United States
- Owner: Vance & O
- Builder: Built in Wilmington, Delaware
- Launched: 1854

General characteristics
- Class & type: Bark
- Tons burthen: 429 tons
- Length: 129 ft (39 m)
- Beam: 28 ft (8.5 m)
- Draft: 13 ft (4.0 m)
- Notes: Signal letters H.N.L.F.

Mahlon Williamson was an 1854 bark (or "barque") that sailed out of Wilmington, Delaware and New York. The ship was active in the cargo and guano trades. The ship is remembered today as the subject of a painting by maritime artist Joseph B. Smith, in which it is being towed on the Delaware River by tugboat William Cramp.

== Voyages ==
The Mahlon Williamson arrived in New York with a cargo of guano from Scharffenerk, St. Carle de Ancud, Chile, for G. Barrell, in December 1861. The ship returned to New York from New Orleans in November, 1865, with a cargo of cotton and flour for McLean & Lintz.
