= Tantauco Park =

Coordinates: 43.212560°S 74.192517°W

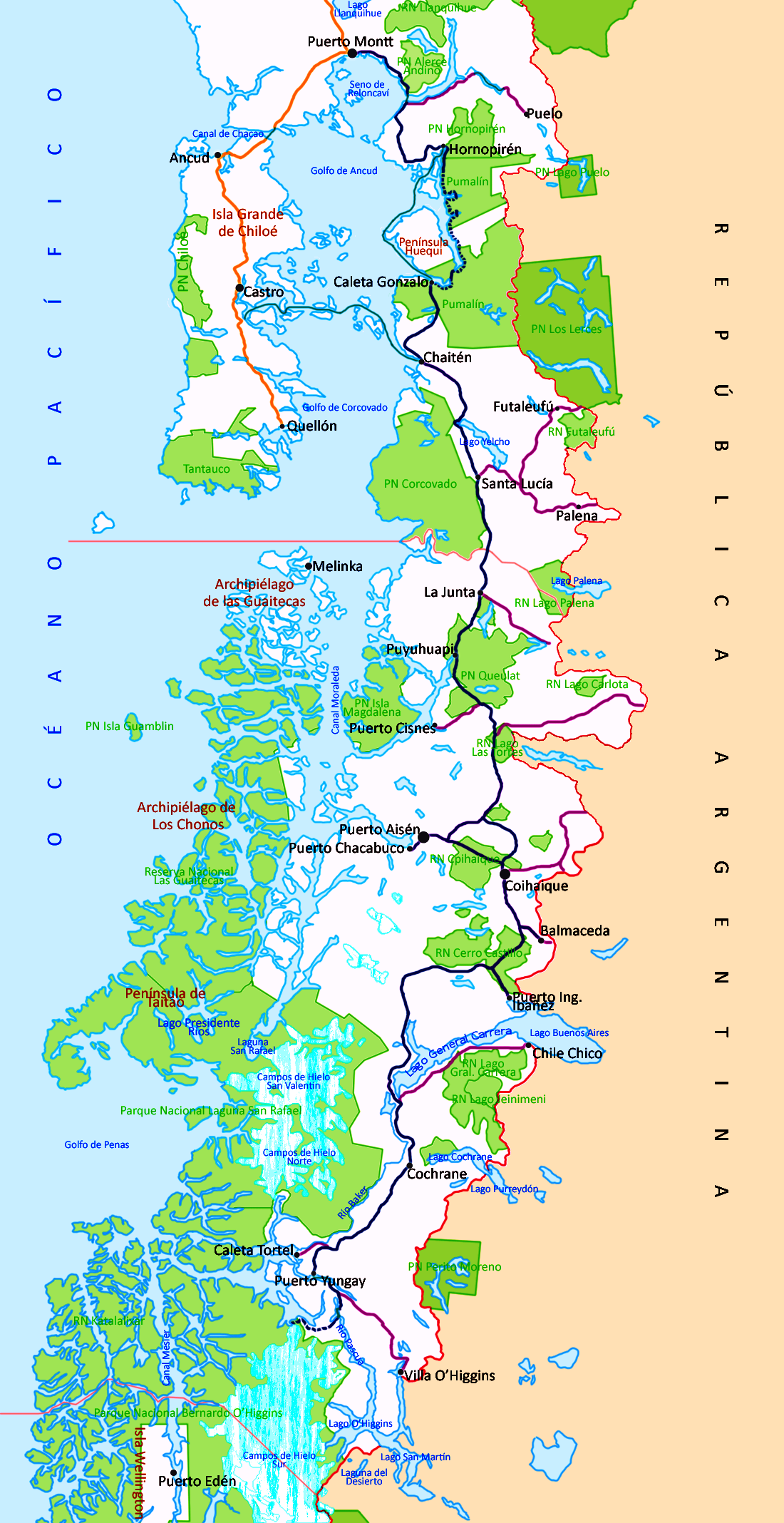
Tantauco Park is situated on the south end of Chiloé Island on the upper left corner of the map

Tantauco Park (Spanish: Parque Tantauco) is a 1,180 km^{2} (456 sq mi) private natural reserve on the south end of Chiloé Island in Chile. The park was created by Chilean business magnate and later President of Chile Sebastián Piñera in 2005 in order to protect 118,000 hectares of the region's unique ecosystem. Piñera owns the foundation Fundación Cultura y Sociedad (formerly Fundación Futuro), which runs the park. The park is open to the public with two campgrounds and a 150 km (93 mi) network of hiking trails.

Tantauco Park is an attractive ecotourist destination due to the remarkable biodiversity of its nearly untouched Valdivian temperate rainforest and the rather easy public access. Precipitations in the area average about 2,500 mm (98 in) annually.

Some of the endangered species that can be seen in the park include Guaitecas cypress, Huillín otter, Chilote fox and the Blue whale
