= Nombre de Jesús (Patagonia) =

Failed Spanish colony started in 1584

Coordinates: 52°19′57″S 68°24′10″W

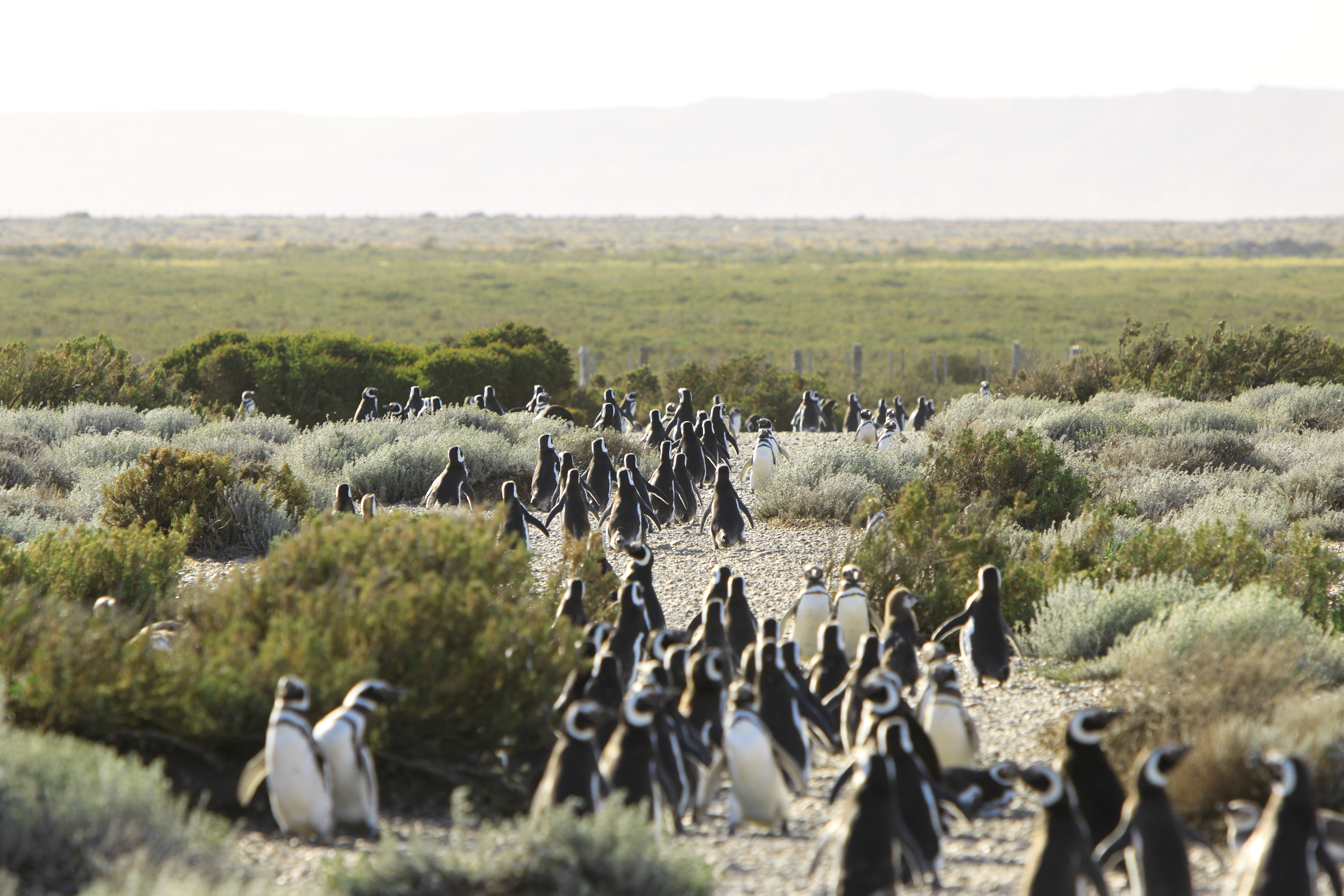
Magellanic penguin colony with the archeological site of Nombre de Jesús in the background

Nombre de Jesús was a Spanish town in Patagonia, settled in 1584 by Pedro Sarmiento de Gamboa in the Magellan Strait. Nombre de Jesús also refers to the archaeological site located in Santa Cruz Province, Argentina, where the remains of this settlement were found. This was the first European settlement in the Magellan Strait.

== History ==
In 1581 King Philip II of Spain sent an expedition to fortify the Magellan Strait against Francis Drake's raids on the Spanish colonies. The colonizing fleet consisted of 23 ships and 3,000 men. It was commanded by Diego Flores de Valdés and sailed on 25 September 1581. Pedro Sarmiento de Gamboa was embarked as future governor of the Strait.

Five ships and 800 people were lost shortly after the fleet left Cadiz. 150 died at sea due to disease, and 200 more at Rio de Janeiro, where the expedition arrived on 24 March 1582. The fleet left Rio de Janeiro in November, but lost another ship at Rio de la Plata. Flores de Valdez decided to return to Brazil. Another ship was lost near the port of Don Rodrigo, and another was damaged by Edward Fenton's fleet and sank upon arriving at Rio.

Nine remaining ships sailed from Santa Catalina on 7 January 1583. One was lost shortly at sea, and three caravels decided to head for the recently founded port of Buenos Aires. Five ships finally arrived at the Strait of Magellan on 1 February 1583, two years after leaving Spain with 23 ships. Unfavorable conditions of the season prevented the expedition from landing, and Flores de Valdes decided to return to Spain.

However, they were met at Rio de Janeiro by four caravels sent from Spain to reinforce the settlements that were to have been established. At this point, Flores de Valdes and Sarmiento de Gamboa parted ways: the first returned to Spain with 3 ships, while Gamboa made a second attempt at the strait with 6 ships and 538 settlers.

On 4 February 1584, after 3 days of failed attempts, the expedition finally landed. 116 soldiers, 48 sailors, 58 settlers, 13 women and 10 children disembarked before a storm broke the moorings, driving 4 ships back to sea. After 10 days of trying to regain the coast, they gave up and returned to Spain. One ship of the remaining two sank in the storm.

Sarmiento de Gamboa founded Nombre de Jesus on 11 February 1584. Most of the cannons had been landed, and he mounted them facing the entrance of the strait. Some of the settlers moved on foot to a place near modern Punta Arenas and founded Ciudad del Rey Don Felipe.

Both settlements were governed by Gamboa, who moved guns and supplies between them on the surviving ship, the Santa Maria. Gamboa faced various uprisings, but managed to contain them.

On 26 May, Gamboa was aboard the Santa Maria near Nombre de Jesus when a storm drove him into the Atlantic. Gamboa struggled for a month to land again at the settlement, but conditions worsened as winter approached. He left for Rio in a vain search of help, and was captured en route to Spain by Walter Raleigh. After his release he fell prisoner of the French. By the time he reached Spain four years later, it was already too late for the settlements.

Thomas Cavendish landed on Ciudad del Rey in 1587 and found that all the settlers had perished. From then on, the site would be known as Port Famine.

== Historical archaeology ==
Despite numerous attempts to locate the remains of the settlement, the site was discovered only in 2003 by a research team funded by CONICET and headed by Dr. María Ximena Senatore and Mariana De Nigris of the University of Buenos Aires.

== See also ==
- Floridablanca (Patagonia)
