= Caicumeo =

Caicumeo, or Caycumeo, was the local name of the Camino Real in Chiloé Island in Chile. It crossed through dense forest and swamps, linking Castro with Ancud. The road was opened in 1788. According to local lore, the name was derived from a villager who is said to have cleared the track using only a machete. The road was established after the Spanish founded the "city-fort" of Ancud in northern Chiloé, leading to increased trade and agricultural expansion.

== See also ==
- Huilliche uprising of 1792
