= Puerto del Hambre =

Historic settlement in Chile

Coordinates: 53°36′40″S 70°55′40″W

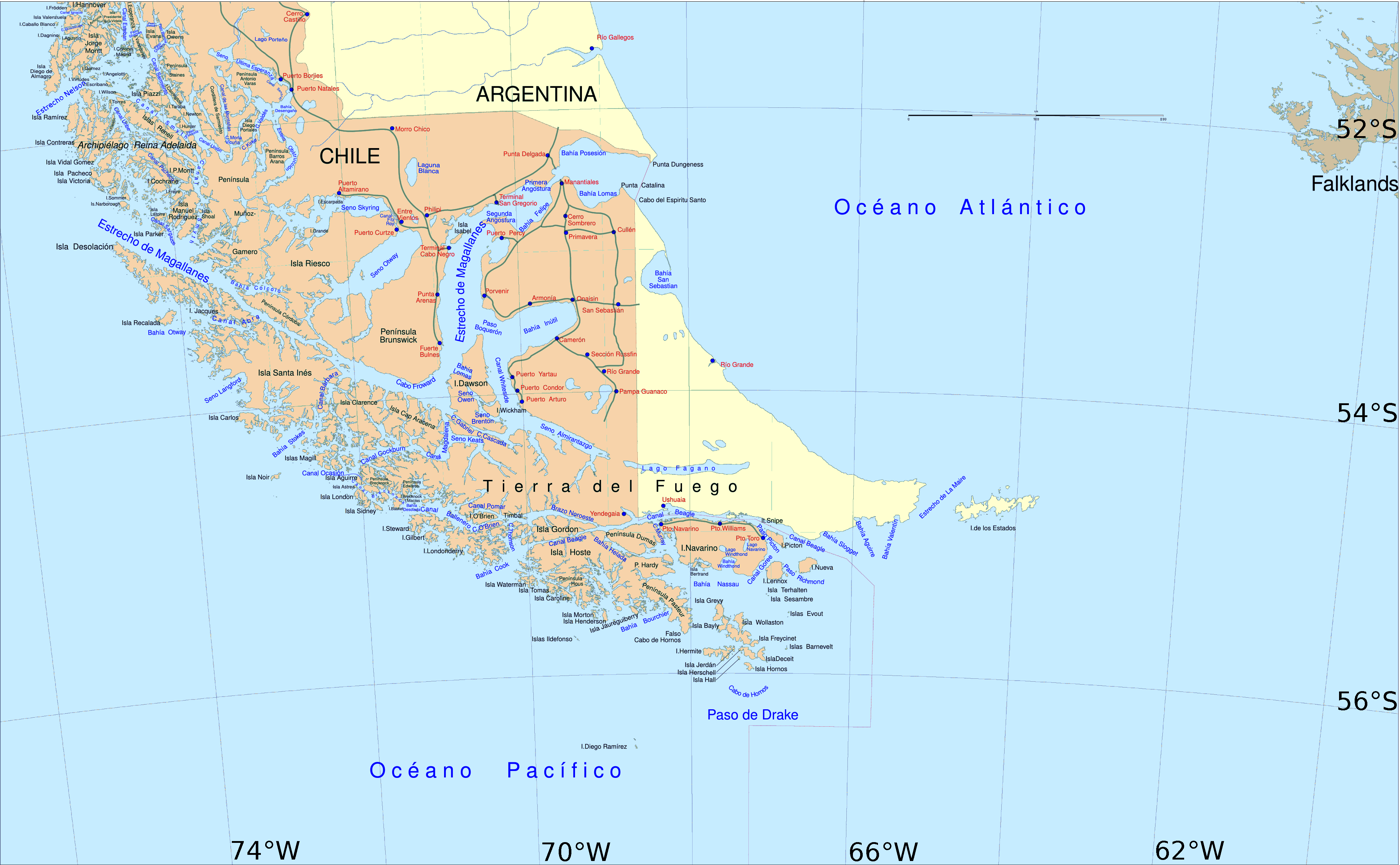
Location of Ciudad del Rey Don Felipe in the Magallanes Region

Location of Port Famine, 70 km south of Punta Arenas

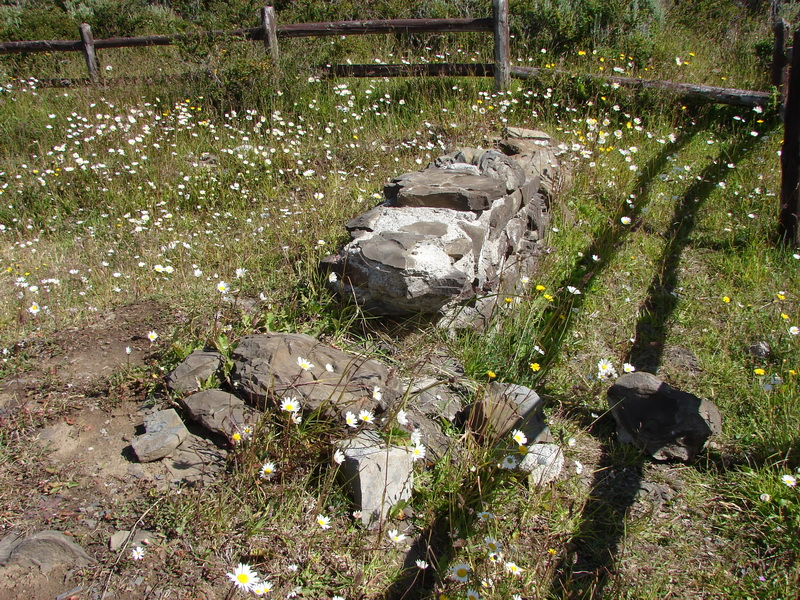
Ruins of the church built by the settlers in 1584

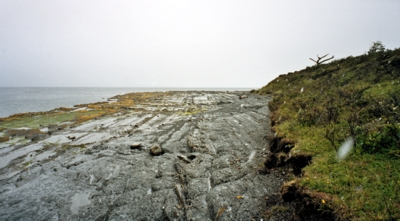
The coast near Puerto Hambre

Ciudad del Rey Don Felipe, also known as Puerto del Hambre (Port Famine), is a historic settlement site at Buena Bay (locally known as Mansa Bay) on the north shore of the Strait of Magellan approximately 58 km (36 mi) south of Punta Arenas in the Región de Magallanes y la Antártica Chilena, Patagonia, Chile.

Puerto Hambre lies halfway between the South Pole and Chile's northern border with Peru. Since Chile claims its Antarctic territories extending all the way to the South Pole, this point is sometimes considered the geographical center of Chile. A monument near the site marks this midpoint.

== History ==
After Francis Drake's successful negotiation of the Strait of Magellan to enter the Pacific Ocean, Spain determined to fortify the strait to hinder further piracy on its ships. Initially two forts commanded by Pedro Sarmiento de Gamboa were planned for Primera Angostura, but that location was discarded because the tide there would aid ships in crossing the narrow passage. A Spanish fleet of 23 ships and almost 3,000 men and settlers sailed from Sanlúcar de Barrameda on 27 September 1581, but storms destroyed two of the ships and caused the fleet to return to Spain. Two months later Sarmiento sailed again with 16 ships and 2,200 men. A miscalculation at Santos resulted in changes in weather and currents for the remainder of the voyage, and affected the fleet's ability to sail safely. Diego Flores, commander of the fleet (Sarmiento had been named Governor of the future settlement, and the two fought constantly for command), was separated from the main fleet by storms near the eastern entrance of the Strait of Magellan and returned to Spain with six ships. Accounts of the event differ greatly: Flores deemed his return a necessity, while Sarmiento called it an abandonment of the mission.

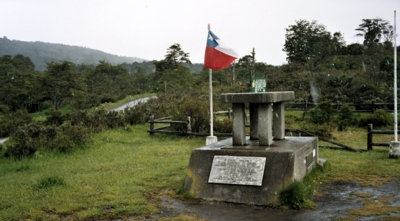
Monument at the site of Puerto Hambre

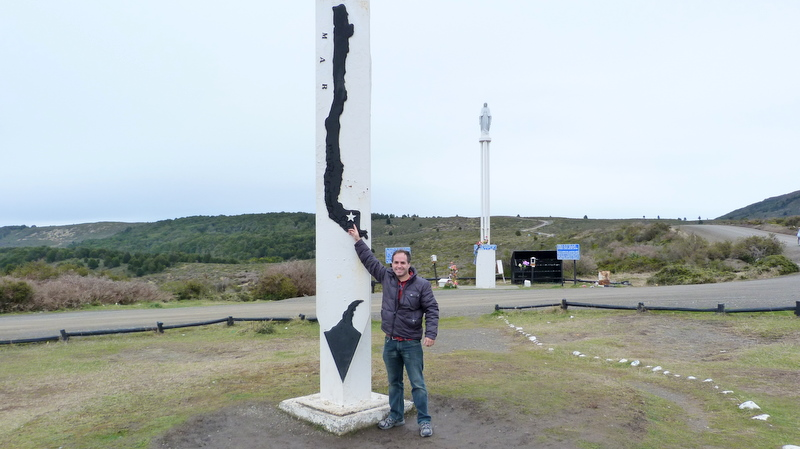
Monument near Puerto Hambre marking the center of Chile, including the Chilean Antarctic Territory

In March 1584 Sarmiento founded the Spanish settlement of Rey Don Felipe with around 300 settlers. Conditions were harsh and local vegetation sparse, and most settlers starved or froze to death. When the next English navigator, Thomas Cavendish, landed at the site in 1587, he found the ruins of the settlement as well as two survivors, one of which died before they left. The other left with the crew. He removed six cannons from the settlement and renamed the place "Port Famine." In the 19th century, it was developed as a naval base used by the British Royal Navy. The name was subsequently translated into Spanish as Puerto Hambre or Puerto del Hambre, and these names are still in use.

According to archeological finds in the 1970s, the base established by Cavendish was located in the Bahía San Juan, just south of the Bahía San Blas where the Ciudad del Rey Felipe had been. The recent discovery of a spanish silver coin (a “real de a ocho”) within the stone foundations of one of the earliest churches, along with the prior recovery of two bronze cannons at the site, helped to identify the precise location of the spanish colony.

The Royal Navy hydrographic survey ship HMS Beagle commanded by Captain Pringle Stokes was surveying Patagonia and Tierra del Fuego when Stokes fell into a deep depression. At Port Famine in August 1828, he locked himself in his cabin and shot himself. He was buried in the Cementerio inglés (English cemetery). His grave is still marked on nautical charts.

Command of HMS Beagle was temporarily given to the Beagle's Executive Officer, Lieutenant W.G. Skyring, and then to Flag Lieutenant Robert FitzRoy. FitzRoy became the captain of the Beagle for its second survey expedition, and he took the young naturalist Charles Darwin as a companion on this voyage. They visited Port Famine a number of times between 1832 and 1834 during the expedition.

Chile determined to resettle the site in the 1840s. On 2 May 1843 the first twenty immigrants, including Bernhard Eunom Philippi, reached the port of Puerto del Hambre. In 1843 Commander John Williams Wilson of the Chilean Navy, also known as Juan Guillermos, built Fuerte Bulnes approximately 2 km (1.2 mi) further south at the Peninsula known as Punta Santa Ana (Santa Ana Point). The fort bolstered Chile's claim to the Strait and the Patagonian lands.

In February 1968 the ruins of Puerto del Hambre were made a National Monument. Fuerte Bulnes, which had been abandoned in the 19th century, was reconstructed from 1941 to 1943. In 1968 it was also designated as a National Monument.

== See also ==
- Allen Francis Gardiner

== Sources ==
- Francisco Solano Asta-Buruaga y Cienfuegos, Diccionario geográfico de la República de Chile, Nueva York: D. Appleton y Compania,, 1899, pg. 582 Puerto del Hambre
- Spate, Oskar Hermann Khristian (2004). The Spanish Lake. Volume 1 of Pacific since Magellan. ANU E Press. ISBN 9781920942168.
