= Ancud =

- City and Commune
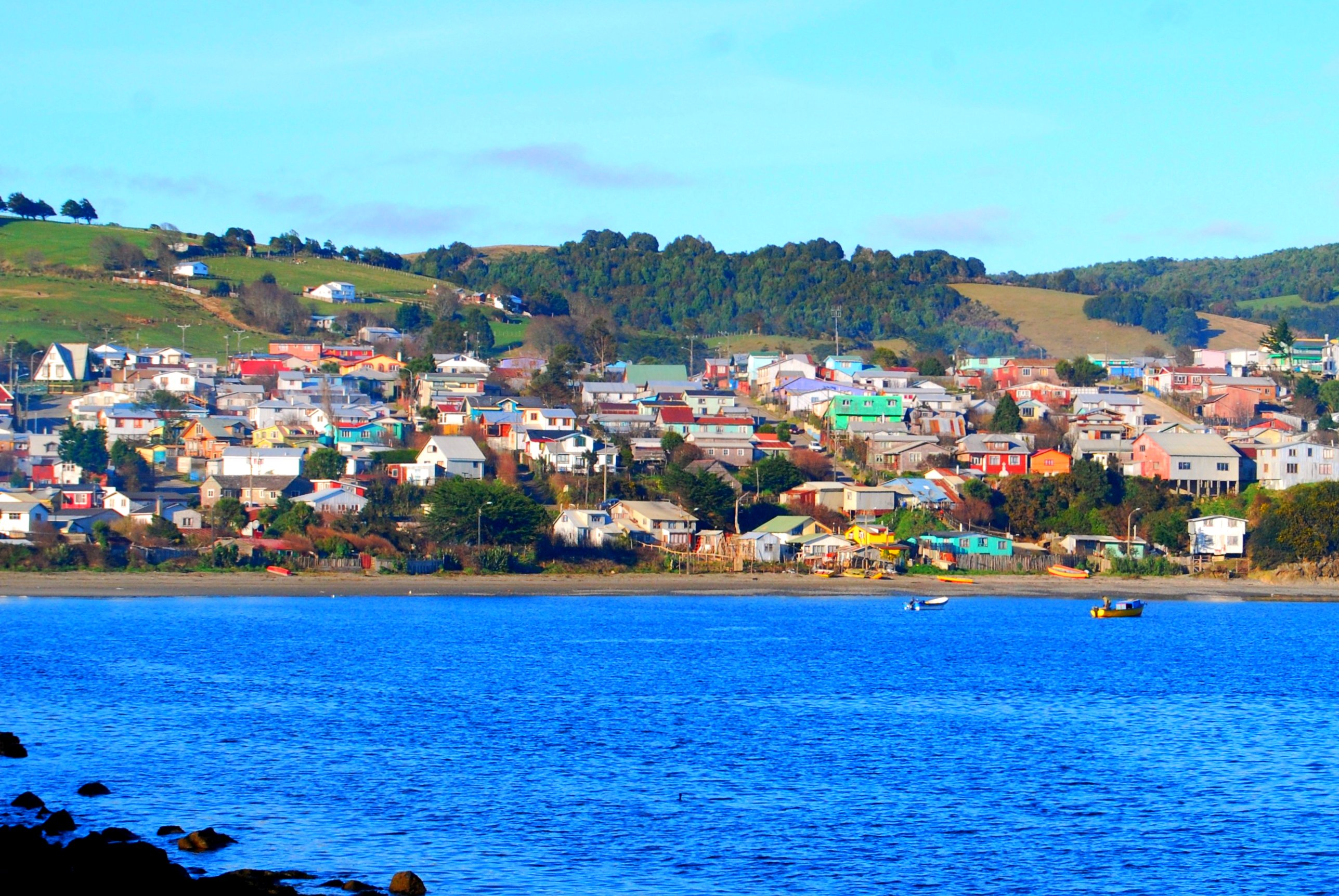
- Partial view of Ancud

- Flag Coat of arms Map of Ancud commune in Los Lagos Region Location in Chile
- Coordinates (city): 41°52′S 73°50′W
- Country: Chile
- Region: Los Lagos
- Province: Chiloé
- Founded as: San Carlos de Chiloé
- Founded: 20 August 1768

Government
  - Type: Municipality
  - Alcalde: Soledad Moreno Nuñez (Ind)

Area
  - Total: 1,252.4 km^{2} (483.6 sq mi)
- Elevation: 0 m (0 ft)

Population (2012 Census)
  - Total: 40,819
  - Density: 32.593/km^{2} (84.415/sq mi)
  - Urban: 27,292
  - Rural: 12,654
- Demonym: Ancuditano

Sex
  - Men: 19,793
  - Women: 20,153
- Time zone: UTC−4 (CLT)
  - Summer (DST): UTC−3 (CLST)
- Area code: 56 + 65
- Website: www.muniancud.cl (in Spanish)

Ancud (Spanish pronunciation: [aŋˈkuð]) is a city in southern Chile located in the northernmost part of the island and province of Chiloé, in Los Lagos Region. It is the second largest city of Chiloé Archipelago after Castro. The city was established in 1768 to function as the capital of the archipelago and held that position until 1982. Founded as bulwark against foreign powers in colonial times, the city played an important role in the Chilean colonization of Patagonia in the 19th century.

== Toponymy ==
There are various interpretations of the origin of its name. One suggestion is that it comes from a Mapudungun expression meaning 'big valley', while others suggest it means 'pot-bellied hills' or 'fertile land'.

== Geography ==
Numerous glaciations have dredged the Chacao Channel to the north, separating Chiloé Island from mainland Chile to the north, marking the border between two natural regions of Chile, Zona Sur to the north and Zona Austral to the south. The Pacific Ocean lies on the west as the Chilean Coastal Range continues as a chain of islands. To the southeast of the commune is Quemchi and Dalcahue to the south. The commune has a surface area of 1,752.4 km^{2} (677 sq mi). To the west are the coastal villages of Pumillahue and Quetalmahue, among others. 25 kilometres (16 mi) west of Ancud lies Islotes de Puñihuil Natural Monument, a group of preserved islands that provide habitat to various penguin species.

== History ==
Prior to its establishment as a Spanish settlement the site of Ancud was known as Puerto Inglés (lit. English port). It was on here that Hendrik Brouwer, the leader of the Dutch expedition to Valdivia died on August 7, 1643, before reaching Valdivia.

As consequence of the Seven Years' War the Spanish authorities had the coastal fortification system of Chile updated and expanded. Inspired in the recommendations of former governor Antonio Narciso de Santa María, the Spanish founded the "city-fort" of Ancud in 1767–1768 and separated Chiloé from the Captaincy General of Chile into a direct dependency of the Viceroyalty of Peru. As with other 18th-century forts in Chile, the establishment of Ancud led through the new Ancud-Castro road to an expansion on local trade and agriculture.

Between 1839 and 1864 the Chilean Navy ran the Ancud Nautical School (Spanish: Escuela Náutica de Ancud) in the town. Among its alumni was Francisco Hudson.

== Climate ==
Ancud has an oceanic climate (Köppen climate classification Cfb) with significant precipitation in each month. Winters are cool and wet with a July average of 7.5 °C (45.5 °F). Precipitation during this time of the year is very high, averaging around 350 millimetres (14 in) and humidity is high, averaging around 87-88%. Summers are mild with a January average of 15.0 °C (59.0 °F) and during this time, precipitation is lower though still significant, averaging 125 millimetres (5 in) in January. Temperatures rarely exceed 30 °C (86.0 °F). The average annual precipitation is 2,540 millimetres (100 in) and there are 200 days with measureable precipitation. However, precipitation is highly variable from year to year with 1993 being the driest, recording only 759 millimetres (30 in) and 1977 being the wettest at 3,712 millimetres (146 in). The record high was 32.7 °C (90.9 °F) on January 27, 1975, and the record low was −3.0 °C (26.6 °F) on June 30, 1970.

Climate data for Ancud
Month	Jan	Feb	Mar	Apr	May	Jun	Jul	Aug	Sep	Oct	Nov	Dec	Year
Record high °C (°F)	32.7 (90.9)	28.2 (82.8)	31.0 (87.8)	24.7 (76.5)	17.8 (64.0)	19.2 (66.6)	20.0 (68.0)	17.2 (63.0)	22.1 (71.8)	23.6 (74.5)	25.2 (77.4)	30.0 (86.0)	32.7 (90.9)
Mean daily maximum °C (°F)	17.8 (64.0)	17.8 (64.0)	16.5 (61.7)	13.8 (56.8)	11.6 (52.9)	9.8 (49.6)	9.4 (48.9)	10.0 (50.0)	11.3 (52.3)	13.0 (55.4)	14.8 (58.6)	16.5 (61.7)	13.5 (56.3)
Daily mean °C (°F)	15.0 (59.0)	14.8 (58.6)	13.6 (56.5)	11.4 (52.5)	9.7 (49.5)	7.9 (46.2)	7.5 (45.5)	8.0 (46.4)	9.1 (48.4)	10.6 (51.1)	12.3 (54.1)	13.9 (57.0)	11.1 (52.0)
Mean daily minimum °C (°F)	10.9 (51.6)	10.3 (50.5)	9.6 (49.3)	8.2 (46.8)	7.2 (45.0)	5.6 (42.1)	5.2 (41.4)	5.4 (41.7)	6.1 (43.0)	7.0 (44.6)	8.6 (47.5)	10.0 (50.0)	7.8 (46.0)
Record low °C (°F)	1.6 (34.9)	0.9 (33.6)	0.9 (33.6)	0.0 (32.0)	0.0 (32.0)	−3.0 (26.6)	−2.8 (27.0)	−2.2 (28.0)	−2.0 (28.4)	0.2 (32.4)	1.8 (35.2)	0.0 (32.0)	−3.0 (26.6)
Average precipitation mm (inches)	124.6 (4.91)	107.4 (4.23)	129.6 (5.10)	195.4 (7.69)	354.2 (13.94)	361.4 (14.23)	326.6 (12.86)	271.4 (10.69)	221.3 (8.71)	172.3 (6.78)	146.9 (5.78)	128.5 (5.06)	2,539.6 (99.98)
Average precipitation days	14	11	13	16	20	21	20	20	19	16	16	14	200
Average relative humidity (%)	74	76	79	84	88	88	87	85	82	78	76	75	81
Source: Dirección Meteorológica de Chile

Climate data for Punta Corona
Month	Jan	Feb	Mar	Apr	May	Jun	Jul	Aug	Sep	Oct	Nov	Dec	Year
Mean daily maximum °C (°F)	16.7 (62.1)	16.7 (62.1)	15.1 (59.2)	13.7 (56.7)	11.9 (53.4)	10.7 (51.3)	10.2 (50.4)	10.3 (50.5)	11.0 (51.8)	12.5 (54.5)	13.5 (56.3)	15.1 (59.2)	13.1 (55.6)
Daily mean °C (°F)	13.7 (56.7)	13.5 (56.3)	12.7 (54.9)	11.2 (52.2)	9.6 (49.3)	8.7 (47.7)	8.3 (46.9)	8.2 (46.8)	8.7 (47.7)	9.9 (49.8)	10.9 (51.6)	12.4 (54.3)	10.7 (51.2)
Mean daily minimum °C (°F)	10.5 (50.9)	10.3 (50.5)	9.6 (49.3)	8.2 (46.8)	7.0 (44.6)	6.1 (43.0)	5.7 (42.3)	5.5 (41.9)	5.9 (42.6)	7.1 (44.8)	8.1 (46.6)	9.5 (49.1)	7.8 (46.0)
Average precipitation mm (inches)	83.5 (3.29)	109.8 (4.32)	153.9 (6.06)	213.3 (8.40)	328.0 (12.91)	332.8 (13.10)	315.0 (12.40)	273.7 (10.78)	205.2 (8.08)	124.5 (4.90)	141.1 (5.56)	119.7 (4.71)	2,400.5 (94.51)
Average relative humidity (%)	85	86	88	89	89	89	89	88	86	86	85	86	87
Source: Bioclimatografia de Chile

== Demographics ==
Historical population
Year	Pop.	±% p.a.
1875	11,391	—
1885	11,606	+0.19%
1895	11,143	−0.41%
1907	11,401	+0.19%
1920	12,093	+0.45%
1930	11,487	−0.51%
1940	13,981	+1.98%
1952	17,501	+1.89%
1970	23,931	+1.75%
1982	29,423	+1.74%
1992	37,516	+2.46%
2002	39,946	+0.63%
2017	38,991	−0.16%
2024	40,949	+0.70%
Source: "Censo de Población y Vivienda". National Statistics Institute.

According to the 2002 census of the National Statistics Institute, Ancud spans an area of 1,252.4 km^{2} (484 sq mi) and has 39,946 inhabitants (19,793 men and 20,153 women). Of these, 27,292 (68.3%) lived in urban areas and 12,654 (31.7%) in rural areas. The population grew by 6.5% (2,430 persons) between the 1992 and 2002 censuses. The demonym of a person from Ancud is Ancuditano for a man and Ancuditana for a woman.

== Administration ==
As a commune, Ancud is a third-level administrative division of Chile administered by a municipal council, headed by an alcalde who is directly elected every four years. The 2008-2012 alcalde is Federico Krüger Finterbüch.

Within the electoral divisions of Chile, Ancud is represented in the Chamber of Deputies by Mr. Gabriel Ascencio (PDC) and Mr. Alejandro Santana (RN) as part of the 58th electoral district, together with Castro, Chacao, Quemchi, Dalcahue, Curaco de Vélez, Quinchao, Puqueldón, Chonchi, Queilén, Quellón, Chaitén, Hualaihué, Futaleufú and Palena. The commune is represented in the Senate by Camilo Escalona Medina (PS) and Carlos Kuschel Silva (RN) as part of the 17th senatorial constituency (Los Lagos Region).

== Education ==
Previously the area had a German school, Deutsche Schule Ancud-Chiloe.

== Landmarks ==
=== Cathedral ===
The Cathedral of Ancud is the main religious temple of the city, and it is a building built after the 1960 earthquake, in the same place as the temple destroyed during that event.

=== Colonial fort system ===
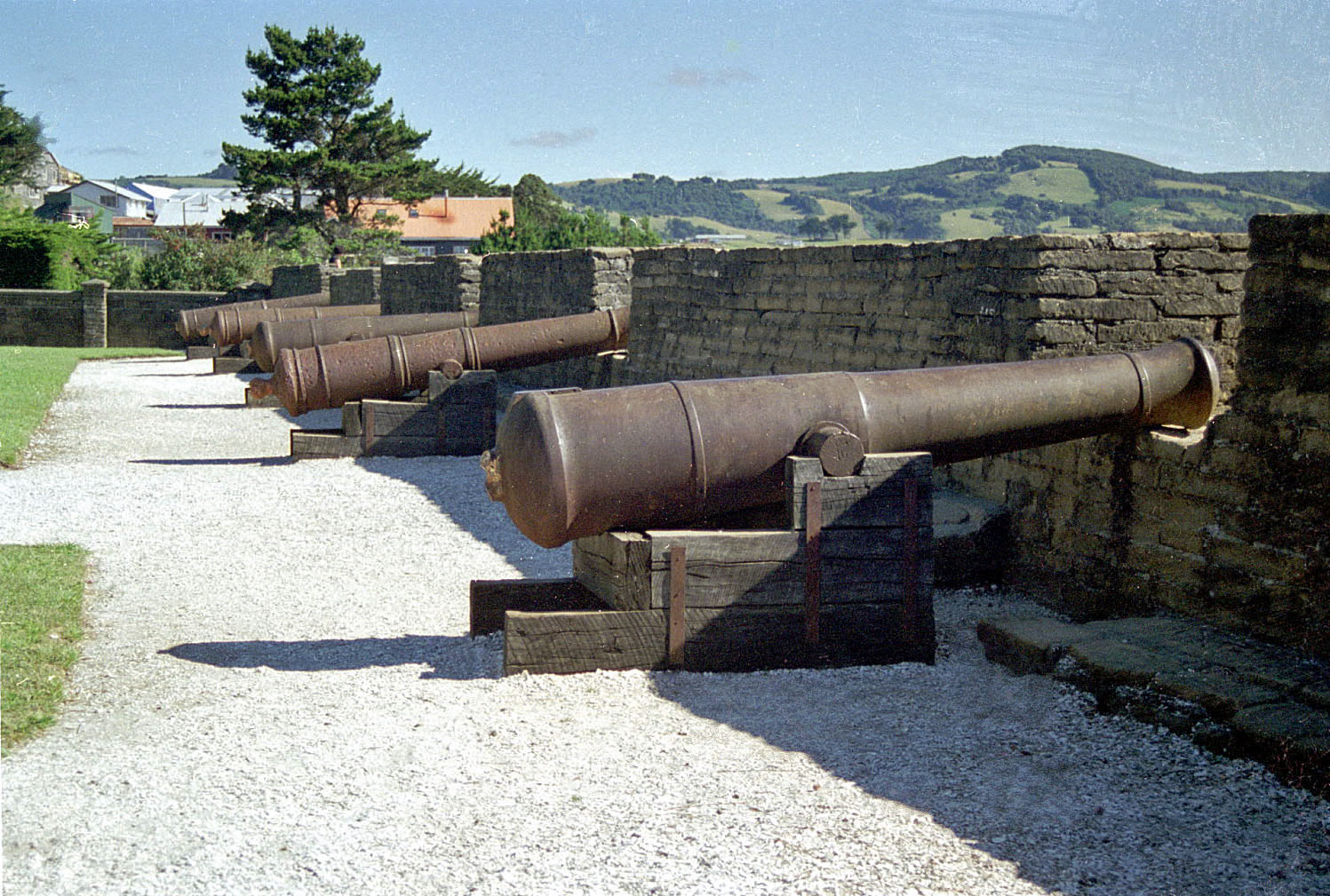
The battery of San Antonio

The fort system of Ancud together with nearby the forts of Agüi one of the four fort systems that existed in colonial Chiloé. The fort system of Ancud is made up of two forts and four batteries. Fuerte Real de San Carlos was built as late as 1824 by orders of Antonio de Quintanilla, the last Spanish governor of Chiloé. The arsenal (polvorín) of this can still be seen at the centre of a small plaza. The battery of San Antonio is the best preserved part of the fort system.

== Gallery ==
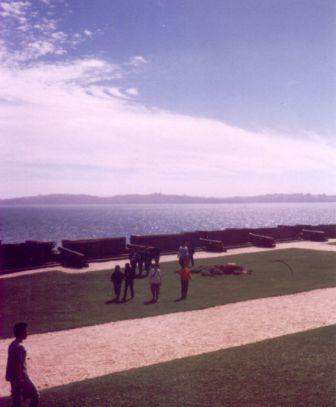
Fuerte San Antonio

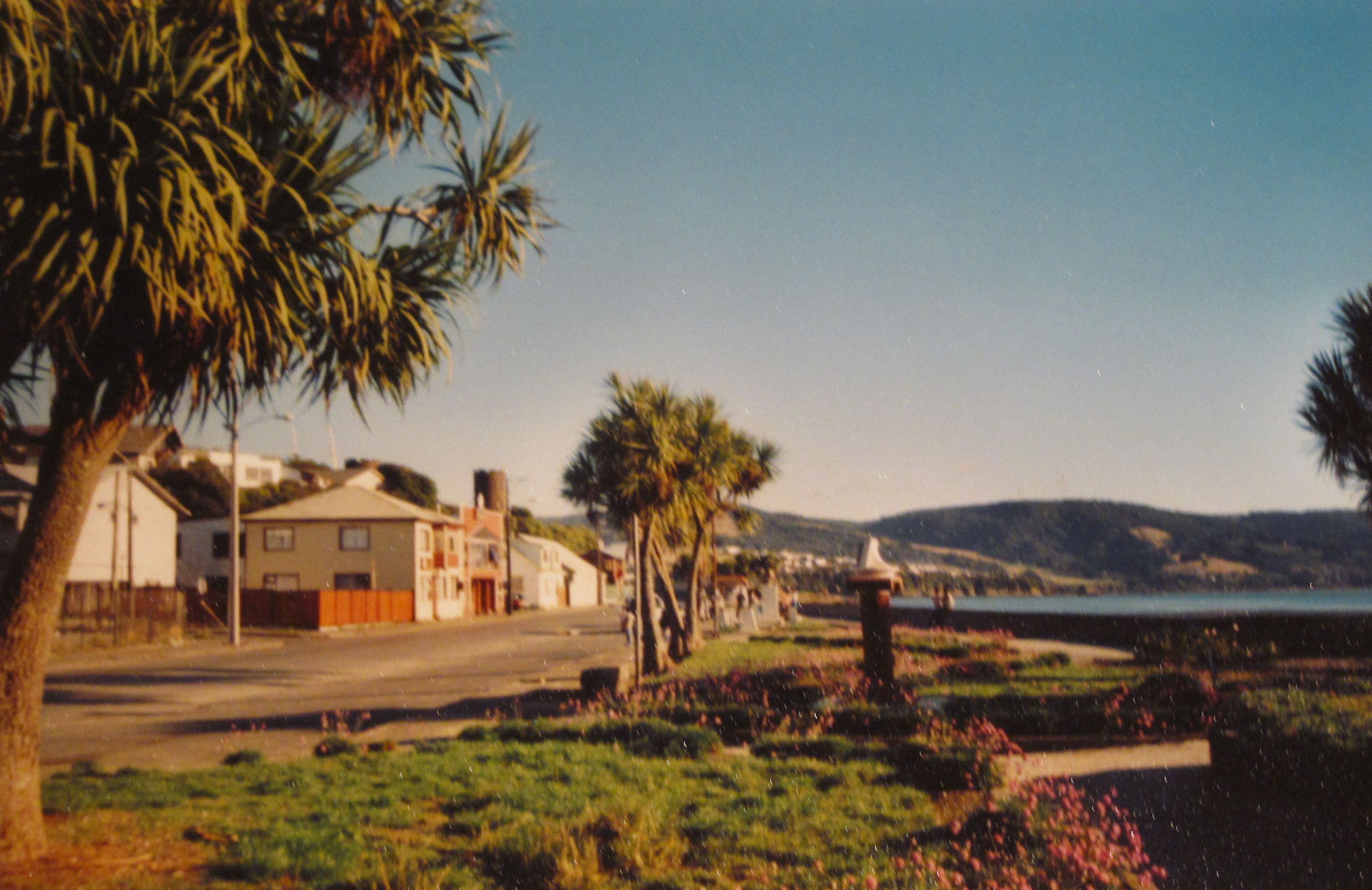
Avenida Salvador Allende

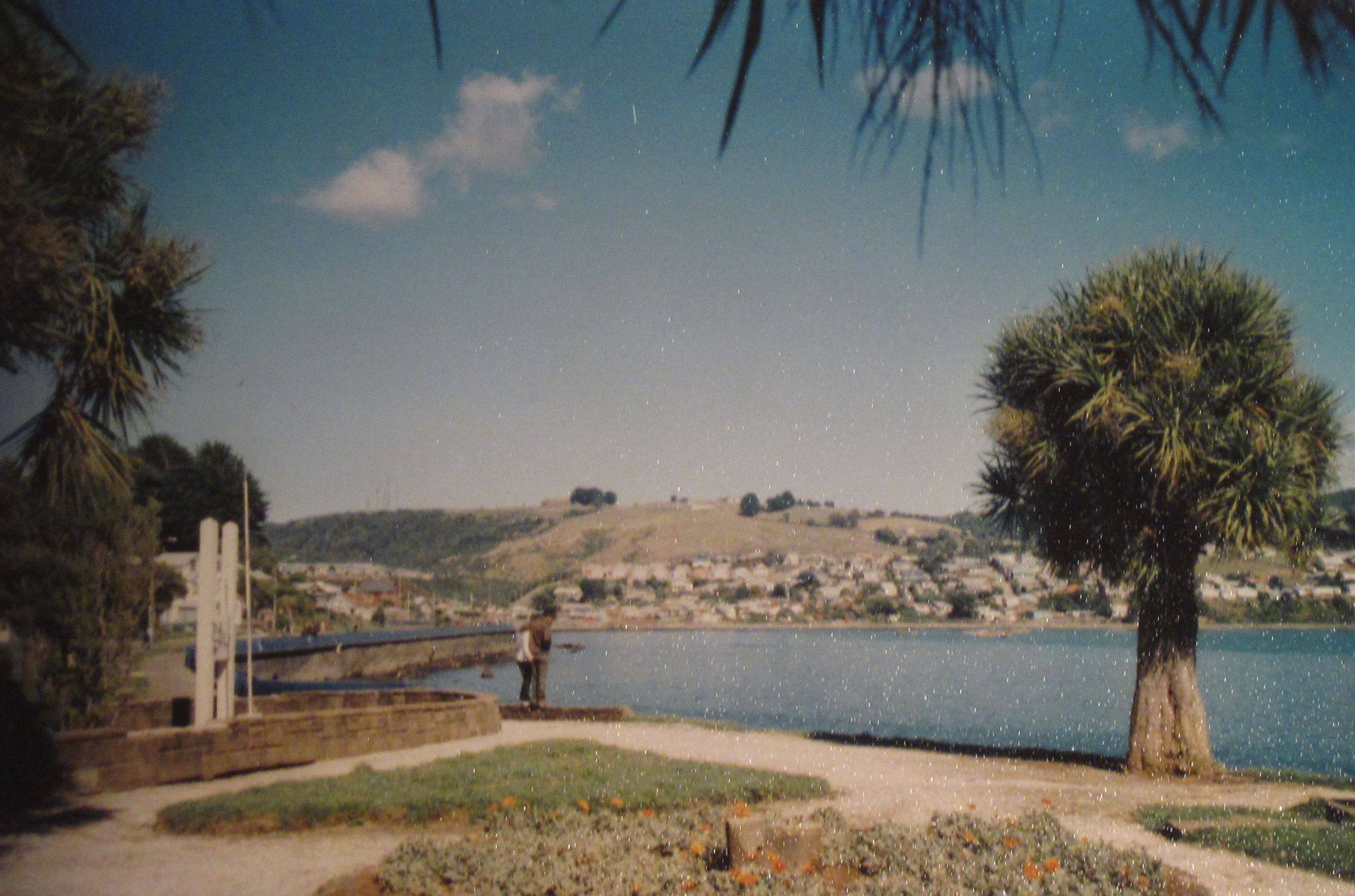
Avenida Salvador Allende

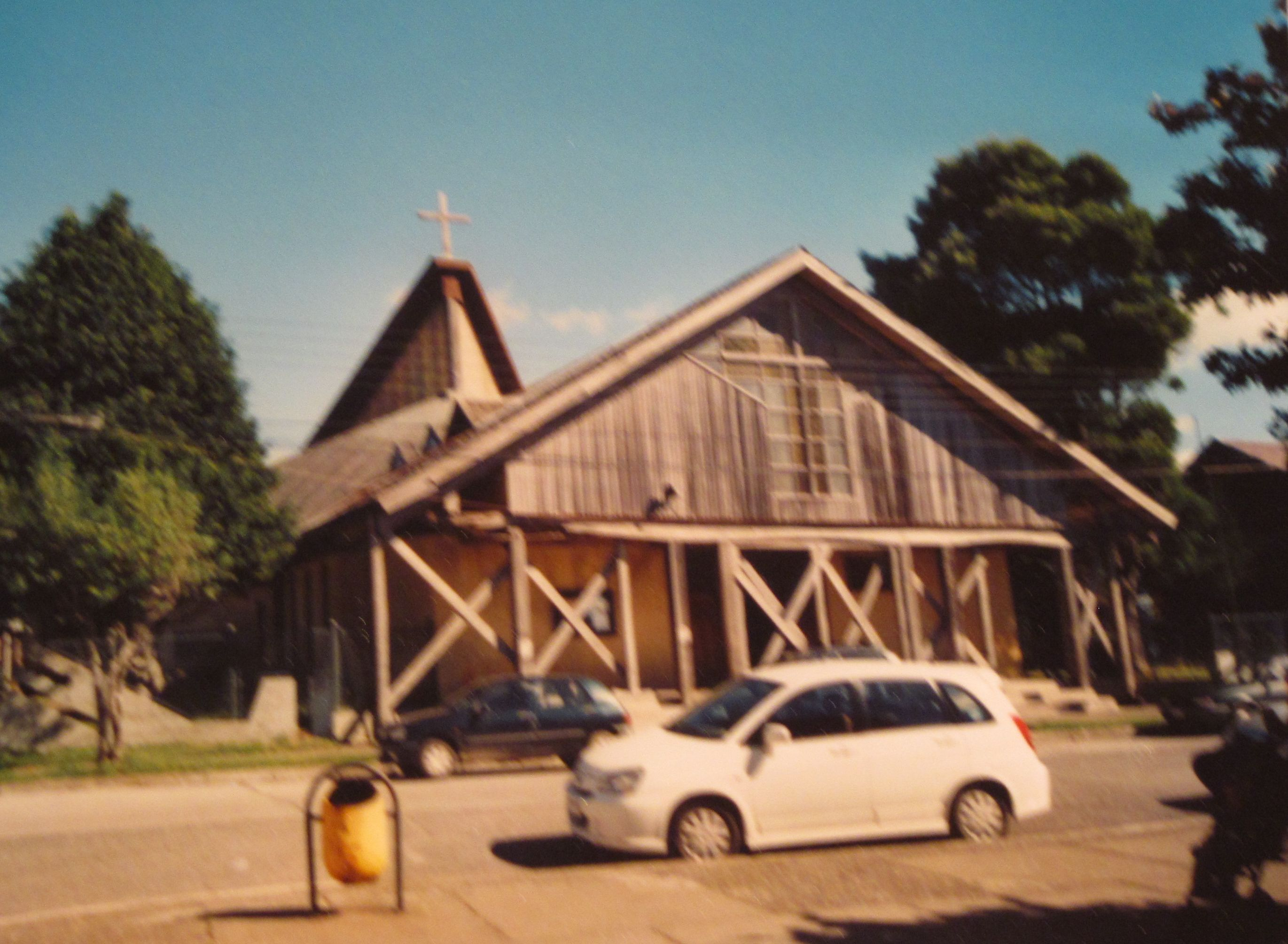
Cathedral

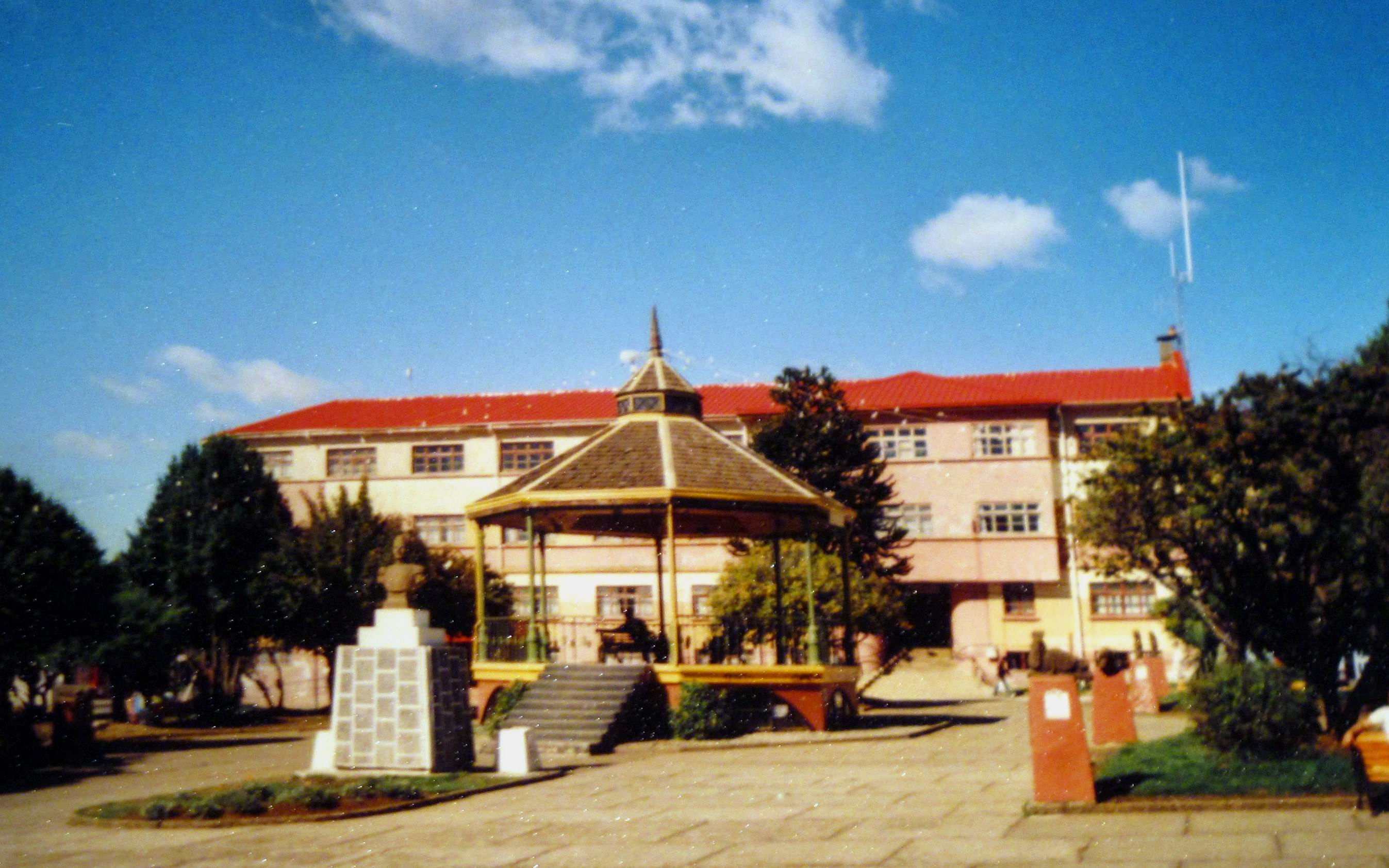
Plaza de Armas and Town Hall

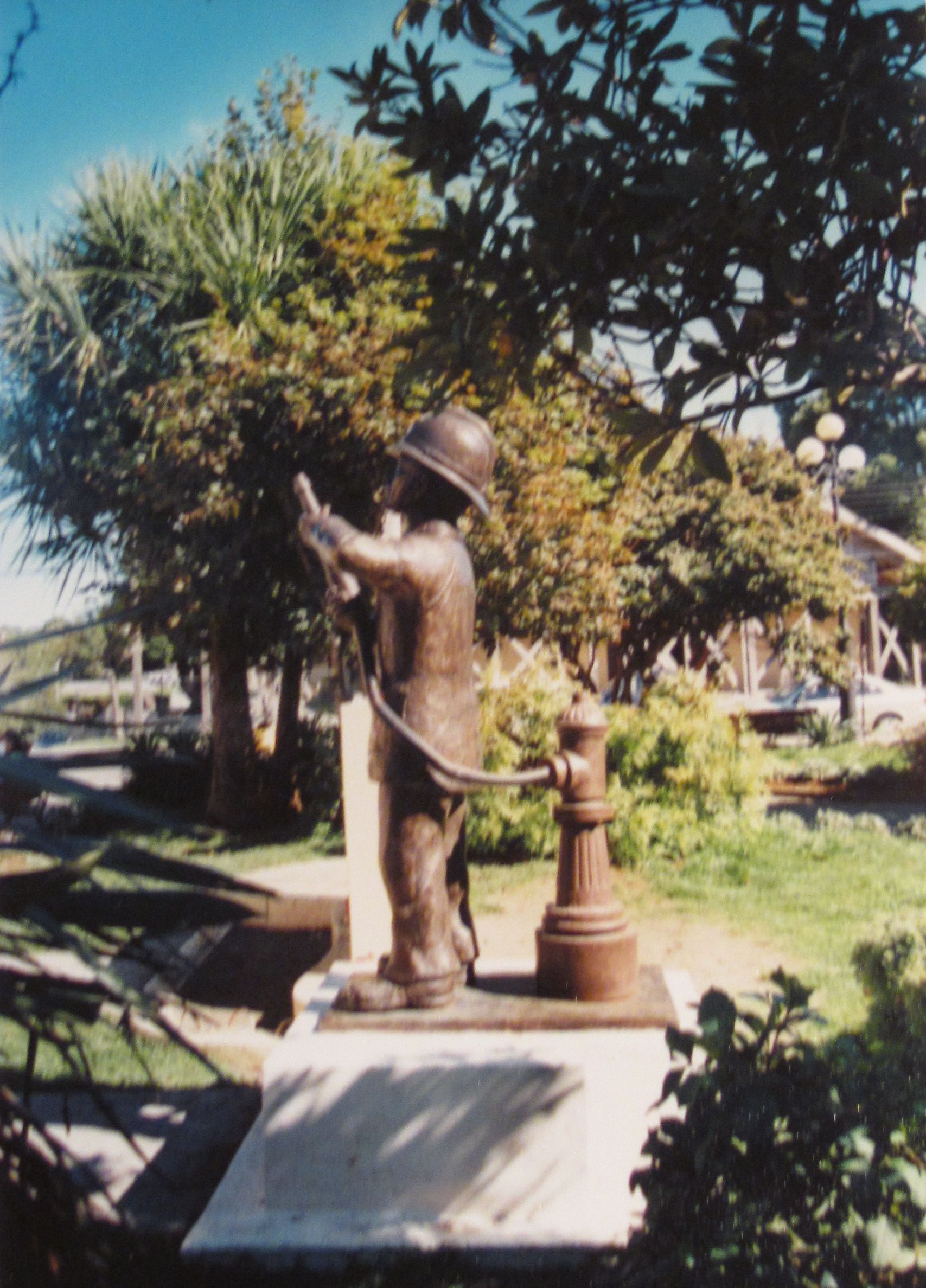
Firebrigade Monument

== See also ==
- Ancud Volcanic Complex
- Churches of Chiloé
- Islotes de Puñihuil Natural Monument
- Mahlon Williamson (barque)
