= Battle of Río Bueno (1654) =

Part of Arauco War

- Part of Arauco War
Date	11 January 1654
Location	Bueno River
Result	Mapuche-Huilliche victory

Belligerents
Spanish Empire	Mapuche-Huilliche: Cuncos

Commanders and leaders
Juan de Salazar	

Strength
900 Spanish soldiers 1,500 Indian auxiliaries	3,000 Mapuche-Huilliches

Casualties and losses
About 100 soldiers lost 200 auxiliaries lost	Few

The battle of Río Bueno (Spanish: Batalla de Río Bueno or Desastre de Río Bueno) was fought in 1654 between the Spanish Army of Arauco and indigenous Cuncos and Huilliches of Fütawillimapu in southern Chile. The battle took place against a background of a long-running enmity between the Cuncos and Spanish, dating back to the destruction of Osorno in 1603. More immediate causes were the killing of Spanish shipwreck survivors and looting of the cargo by Cuncos, which led to Spanish desires for a punishment, combined with the prospects of lucrative slave raiding.

While Cuncos and Jesuits made attempts to placate the mood of war, maestre de campo Juan de Salazar eventually convinced Governor of Chile Antonio de Acuña Cabrera to authorise and support his expedition. The battle was fought across the Bueno River where Cuncos and Huilliches repelled Spanish attempts to cross the river, resulting in hundreds of Spanish troops drowned or killed. The battle encouraged the Mapuche uprising of 1655, in which many Spanish settlements and haciendas were ravaged.

The Battle of Río Bueno along with the subsequent events led to a political crisis among the Spanish in Chile, which involved a risk of civil war. The severity of the crisis led historian Miguel Luis Amunátegui to list it in 1870 among the precursors to the independence of Chile. The Cuncos and Huilliches south of the Bueno River remained de facto independent until the late 18th century.

== Background ==
=== Renewed Cunco-Spanish conflict ===
The location of Spanish settlements and forts within the modern boundaries of Chile and Argentina. In red is the land of Cuncos.

Governor of Chile Antonio de Acuña Cabrera arranged the Parliament of Boroa in January 1651. With this parliament, peace was established between the Spanish and the northern Mapuches. On 21 March 1651, the Spanish ship San José was sailing to the newly re-established Spanish city of Valdivia (Note: The city of Valdivia had been reestablished by the Spanish in 1645 following a 1643 Dutch attempt to establish a settlement in the location.) when it was pushed by storms onto coasts inhabited by the Cuncos, a southern Mapuche tribe. There, the ship ran aground and while most of the crew managed to survive the wreck, nearby Cuncos killed them and took possession of the valuable cargo. The Spanish made fruitless efforts to recover anything left in the wreck. Governor Acuña Cabrera was temporarily dissuaded from sending a punitive expedition from Boroa by Jesuit fathers Diego de Rosales and Juan de Moscoso who argued that the murders were committed by a few Indians and warned the governor that renewing warfare would dissipate the gains obtained at Boroa. Punitive expeditions were finally sent against the Cunco, one from Valdivia and one from Carelmapu. Governor of Valdivia Diego González Montero advanced south with his forces but soon found that tribes he expected to join him as allies were indifferent and even misled him with false rumours. His troops ran out of supplies and had to return to Valdivia. While González Montero was away coastal Huilliches killed twelve Spanish and sent their heads to other Mapuche groups of southern Chile "as if they wanted to create a grand uprising" according to historian Diego Barros Arana. The Spanish expeditions were meant to meet at the Bueno River but the failure of the expedition from Valdivia prevented this. The expedition from Carelmapu led by Captain Ignacio Carrera Yturgoyen penetrated north to the vicinity of the ruins of Osorno where they were approached by Huilliches who handed over three "caciques", allegedly responsible for the murders. The Spanish and local Huilliches exchanged words telling each other of the benefits of peace. Then, the Spanish of Carelmapu executed the three, hanged them on hooks as a warning, and returned south. Spanish soldiers in Concepción, the "military capital" of Chile, were dissatisfied with the results. Barros Arana considers that some may have pushed for war for personal benefit.

=== Salazar's slave-hunting army ===
Acuña Cabrera and his brother-in-law maestre de campo Juan de Salazar began to plan an expedition to the lands of the Cuncos in the spring of 1653. It was thought to be a lucrative slave raiding expedition. Despite a general ban on the slavery of indigenous people by the Spanish Crown, the 1598–1604 Mapuche uprising that ended with the Destruction of the Seven Cities made the King of Spain in 1608 declare slavery legal for those Mapuches caught in war. Mapuches "rebels" were considered Christian apostates and could therefore be enslaved according to the church teachings of the day. In reality these legal changes only formalized Mapuche slavery that was already occurring at the time, with captured Mapuches being treated as property in the way that they were bought and sold among the Spanish. (Note: Much like the Spanish, Mapuches had also captured Spanish, often women, trading their ownership among them. Indeed, with the Destruction of the Seven Cities Mapuches are reported to have taken 500 Spanish women captive, holding them as slaves. It was not uncommon for captive Spanish women to have changed owner several times.) Legalisation made Spanish slave raiding increasingly common in the Arauco War. Mapuche slaves were exported north to places such as La Serena and Lima.

To reinforce the expeditionary army, Acuña Cabrera attempted first to revive a practice of military service for local encomenderos; however, the encomenderos refused to obey the order. Acuña Cabrera ignored this insubordination and proceeded instead to boost the expedition with the purchase of 400 horses in Santiago.

== Battle ==
The Spanish expedition started from the fort of Nacimento in La Frontera with a force of 900 soldiers and 1500 Indian auxiliaries.

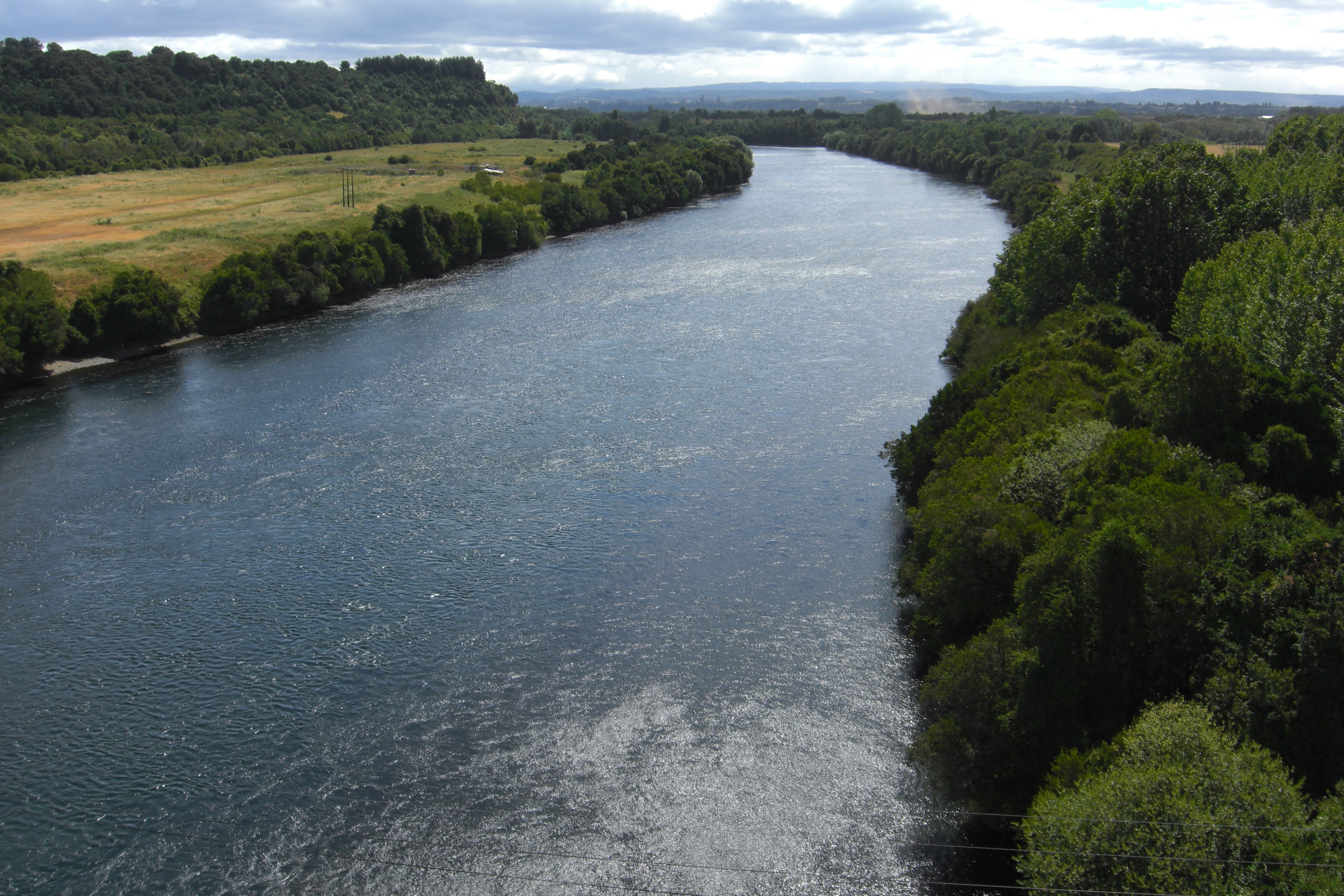
The Bueno River as seen from Chile Route 5

The Spanish reached the northern shores of east-to-west flowing Bueno River on 11 January 1654. To cross the river, Salazar ordered the construction of a pontoon bridge. Local Mapuche-Huilliches had been warned in advance of the Spanish advance south, so they concentrated in large numbers on the opposite shore of the river. The Mapuche-Huilliche had brought women and children with them, but they remained hidden in the forest, as did also most of the men, only the ones on horseback revealing themselves to the Spanish. In total, Mapuche-Huilliche forces numbered about 3000 men armed primarily with lances.

Some veteran officers expressed their doubts about Salazar's plans, including the stability of the bridge. As the pontoon bridge stood ready, Juan de Salazar sent a first force across. About 200 soldiers that had crossed were quickly surrounded and were being routed, so Salazar ordered the other soldiers to speed up their march across the bridge. However, the bridge was not stable enough and at this point broke apart with disastrous consequences for the Spanish. Altogether, the Spanish lost a hundred professional soldiers and 200 auxiliaries in a battle where the actual fighting was very limited. Despite these losses, the surviving Spanish managed to get back north to their bases without harassment from the Mapuche.

== Aftermath ==
On learning of the defeat, governor Acuña Cabrera ordered an investigation into any military misconduct during the campaign. However, Salazar's sister Juana de Salazar, who was the wife of the governor, arranged for witnesses to justify her brother's actions. The investigation concluded by recommending that Juan de Salazar be granted the command of a larger army to chastise the Cuncos and allow Salazar to "recover his honour".

The planning of a second expedition in the summer of 1655 contributed to unleash a large Mapuche uprising that year.

== Bibliography ==
- Barros Arana, Diego. "Capítulo XIV". Historia general de Chile (in Spanish). Vol. Tomo cuarto (Digital edition based on the second edition of 2000 ed.). Alicante: Biblioteca Virtual Miguel de Cervantes.
- Montt Pinto, Isabel (1971). Breve Historia de Valdivia (in Spanish). Buenos Aires: Editorial Francisco de Aguirre. OCLC 1397610. Archived from the original on 18 February 2007.
- Pinochet Ugarte, Augusto; Villaroel Carmona, Rafael; Lepe Orellana, Jaime; Fuente-Alba Poblete, J. Miguel; Fuenzalida Helms, Eduardo (1997). Historia militar de Chile (in Spanish) (3rd ed.). Biblioteca Militar.
- Valenzuela Márquez, Jaime (2009). "Esclavos mapuches. Para una historia del secuestro y deportación de indígenas en la colonia". In Gaune, Rafael; Lara, Martín (eds.). Historias de racismo y discriminación en Chile (in Spanish).
