= Mapuche slavery =

Slavery in 17th-century Chile

Mapuche slavery was commonplace in 17th-century Chile and a direct consequence of the Arauco War. When Spanish conquistadors initially subdued the Indigenous inhabitants of Chile, there was no slavery but a form of involuntary servitude called encomienda. However, this form of forced labour was harsh and many Mapuche would end up dying in the Spanish gold mines during the 16th century.

== Beginning of formal slavery ==
Formal slavery of indigenous people was prohibited by the Spanish Crown. The 1598–1604 Mapuche uprising that ended with the Destruction of the Seven Cities made Philip III of Spain in 1608 declare slavery legal for those Mapuche caught in war. Rebelling Mapuche were considered Christian apostates and could therefore be enslaved according to the church teachings of the day. This legal change formalized Mapuche slavery that was already occurring at the time, with captured Mapuche being treated as property in the way that they were bought and sold among the Spaniards. Legalisation made Spanish slave raiding increasingly common in the Arauco War. Mapuche slaves were exported north as far as La Serena and Lima.

Spanish slave raiding played a major role in unleashing the Mapuche uprising of 1655. This uprising took place in a context of increasing Spanish hostilities on behalf of maestre de campo Juan de Salazar who used the Army of Arauco to capture Mapuche and sell them into slavery. In 1654 a large slave hunting expedition against the Cunco ended in a complete disaster at the Battle of Río Bueno. This setback did not stop the Spanish who under the leadership of Salazar organized a new expedition the summer of 1655. Salazar himself is said to have profited greatly from Mapuche slave trade and being brother-in-law of governor Antonio de Acuña Cabrera allowed him to exert influence in favour of his military campaigns. Analysing the situation in the 1650s, the Real Audiencia of Santiago opined that slavery of Mapuches was one of the reasons of constant state of war between the Spaniards and the Mapuche.

The Mapuche also captured Spaniards, often women, trading their ownership among them. Indeed, with the Destruction of the Seven Cities, Mapuche were reported to have taken 500 Spanish women captive, holding them as slaves. It was not uncommon for captive Spanish women to have changed owner several times.

Slavery for Mapuche "caught in war" was abolished in 1683 after decades of legal attempts by the Spanish Crown to suppress it. By that time free mestizo labour had become significantly cheaper than ownership of slaves which made historian Mario Góngora in 1966 conclude that economic factors were behind the abolition.

This 1608 decree that legalized slavery was abused as Spanish settlers in Chiloé Archipelago used it also to launch slave raids against groups such the Chono of northwestern Patagonia who had never been under Spanish rule and never rebelled.

== Decline of Mapuche slavery ==
Philip III of Spain's successor Philip IV of Spain changed course in the latter part of his reign and began restricting Mapuche slavery. Philip IV died without freeing the indigenous slaves of Chile but his wife Mariana of Austria, serving as regent, and his son Charles II of Spain engaged in a broad anti-slavery campaign throughout the Spanish Empire.

The anti-slavery campaign began with an order by Mariana of Austria in 1667 freeing all the Indian slaves in Peru that had been captured in Chile. Her order was met with disbelief and dismay in Peru. Without exception she freed the Indian slaves of Mexico in 1672. After receiving a plea from the Pope she freed the slaves of the southern Andes. On 12 June 1679, Charles II issued a general declaration freeing all indigenous slaves in Spanish America. In 1680 this was included in the Recopilación de las leyes de Indias, a codification of the laws of Spanish America. The Caribs ("cannibals") were the only exception. Governor Juan Enríquez of Chile resisted strongly, writing protests to the king and not publishing the decrees freeing Indian slaves. The royal anti-slavery crusade did not end indigenous slavery in Spain's American possessions, but, in addition to resulting in the freeing of thousands of slaves, it ended the involvement and facilitation by government officials of slaving by the Spaniards; purchase of slaves remained possible but only from indigenous slavers such as the Caribs of Venezuela or the Comanche.
