= Frontier =

Area near or beyond a boundary

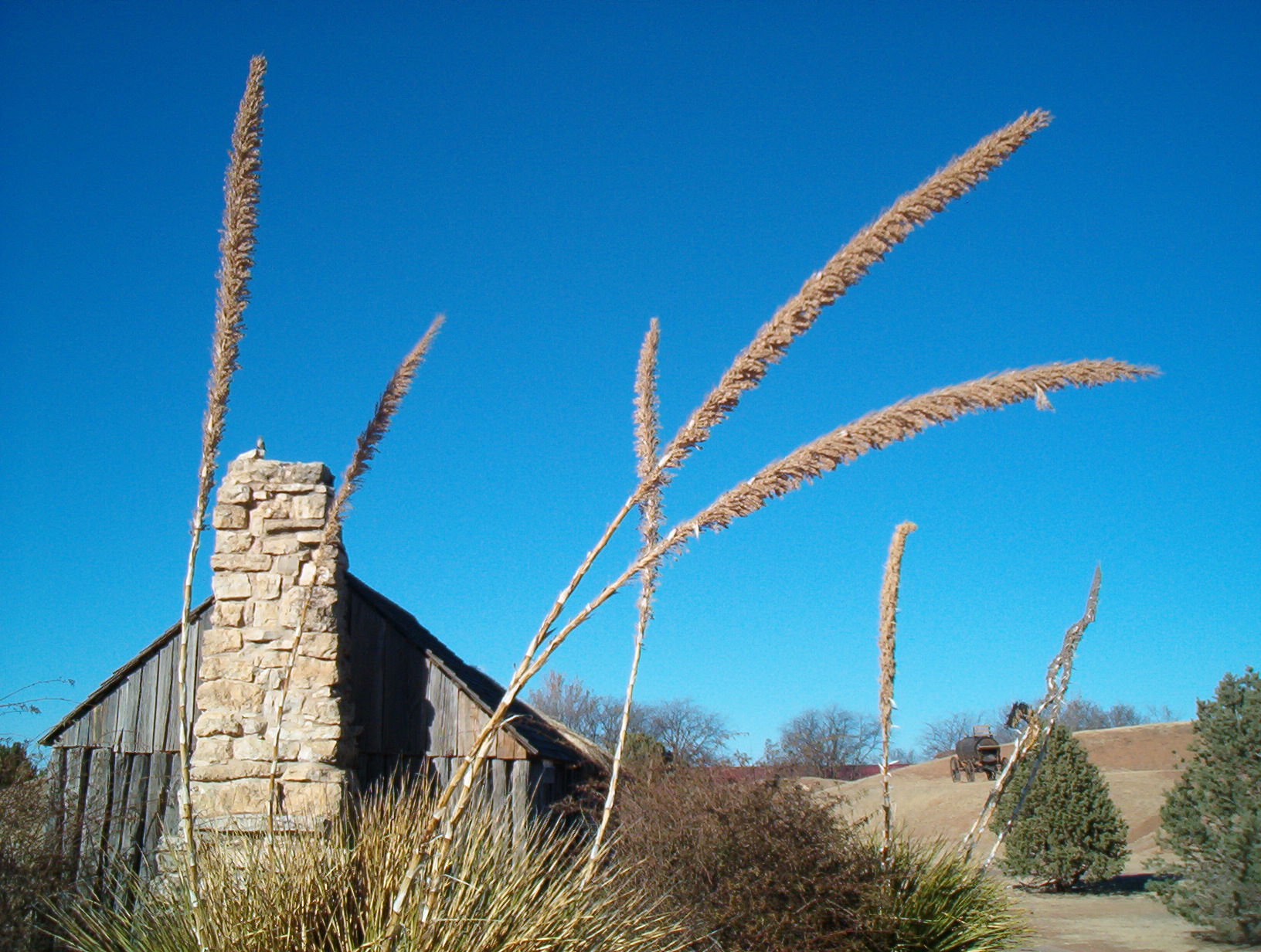
A restored pioneer house at the National Ranching Heritage Center in Lubbock, Texas.

A frontier is a political and geographical term referring to areas near or beyond a boundary, particularly zones at the edge of settled or governed territory. The concept carries distinct meanings in different national and cultural contexts, but broadly describes a transitional zone between an established civilization and unknown, ungoverned, or contested land. In colonial and post-colonial history, frontiers played a central role in the expansion of European powers into the Americas, Asia, and Australia. Countries such as Brazil, Argentina, Chile, and the United States each developed distinct frontier cultures, mythologies, and policies shaped by encounters with indigenous peoples, geographic conditions, and imperialist ambitions. In the United States, the concept was most influentially theorized by historian Frederick Jackson Turner, whose Frontier Thesis (1893) argued that the frontier experience was the defining force in shaping American democracy and national character. Canada developed a parallel historiographical tradition through scholars such as Harold Adams Innis. Beyond the Americas, frontier zones shaped imperial expansion in Russia, China, and the Indian subcontinent. The word "frontier" entered English from French in the 15th century with the meaning "borderland"; its use to describe the edge of settled territory is a distinctly North American development.

== Australia ==
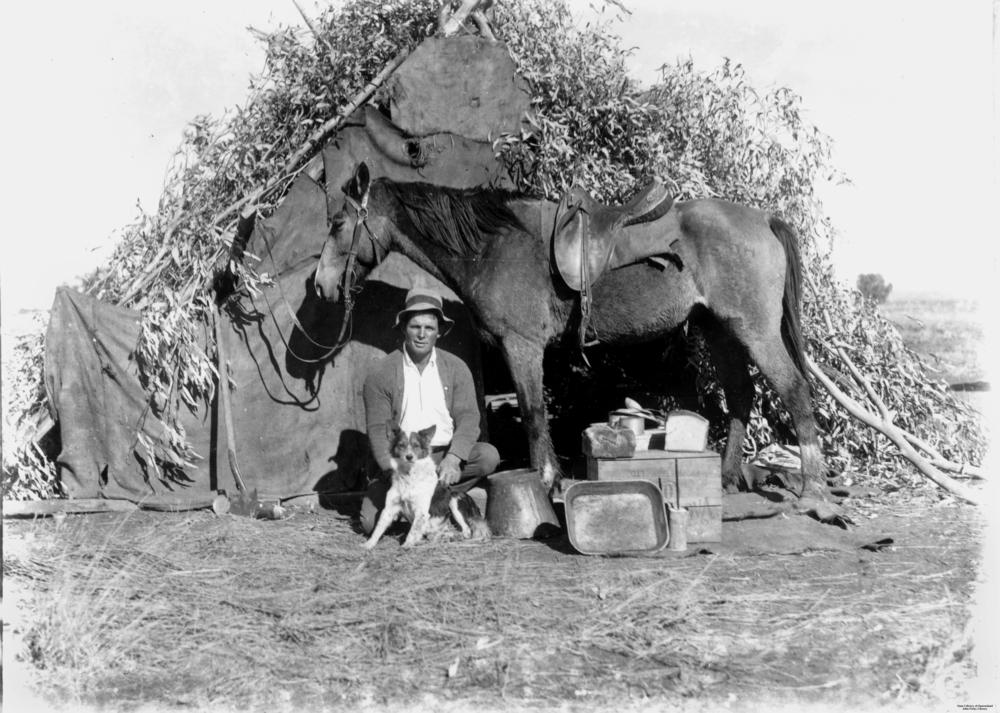
Australian bushman with his dog and horse, c. 1910

The term "frontier" was frequently used in colonial Australia in the meaning of country that borders the unknown or uncivilised, the boundary, border country, the borders of civilisation, or as the land that forms the furthest extent of what was frequently termed "the inside" or "settled" districts. The "outside" was another term frequently used in colonial Australia; this term covered not only the frontier but the districts beyond. Settlers at the frontier thus frequently referred to themselves as "the outsiders" or "outside residents" and to the area in which they lived as "the outside districts". At times one might hear the "frontier" described as "the outside borders". However the term "frontier districts" was seemingly used predominantly in the early Australian colonial newspapers whenever dealing with skirmishes between black and white in northern New South Wales and Queensland, and in newspaper reports from South Africa, whereas it was seemingly not so commonly used when dealing with affairs in Victoria, South Australia, and southern New South Wales. The use of the word "frontier" was thus frequently connected to descriptions of frontier violence, as in a letter printed in the Sydney Morning Herald in December 1850 which described murder and carnage at the northern frontier and calling for the protection of the settlers saying: "...nothing but a strong body of Native Police will restore and keep order in the frontier districts, and as the squatters are taxed for the purpose of such protection".

== Brazil ==
=== Sertão ===
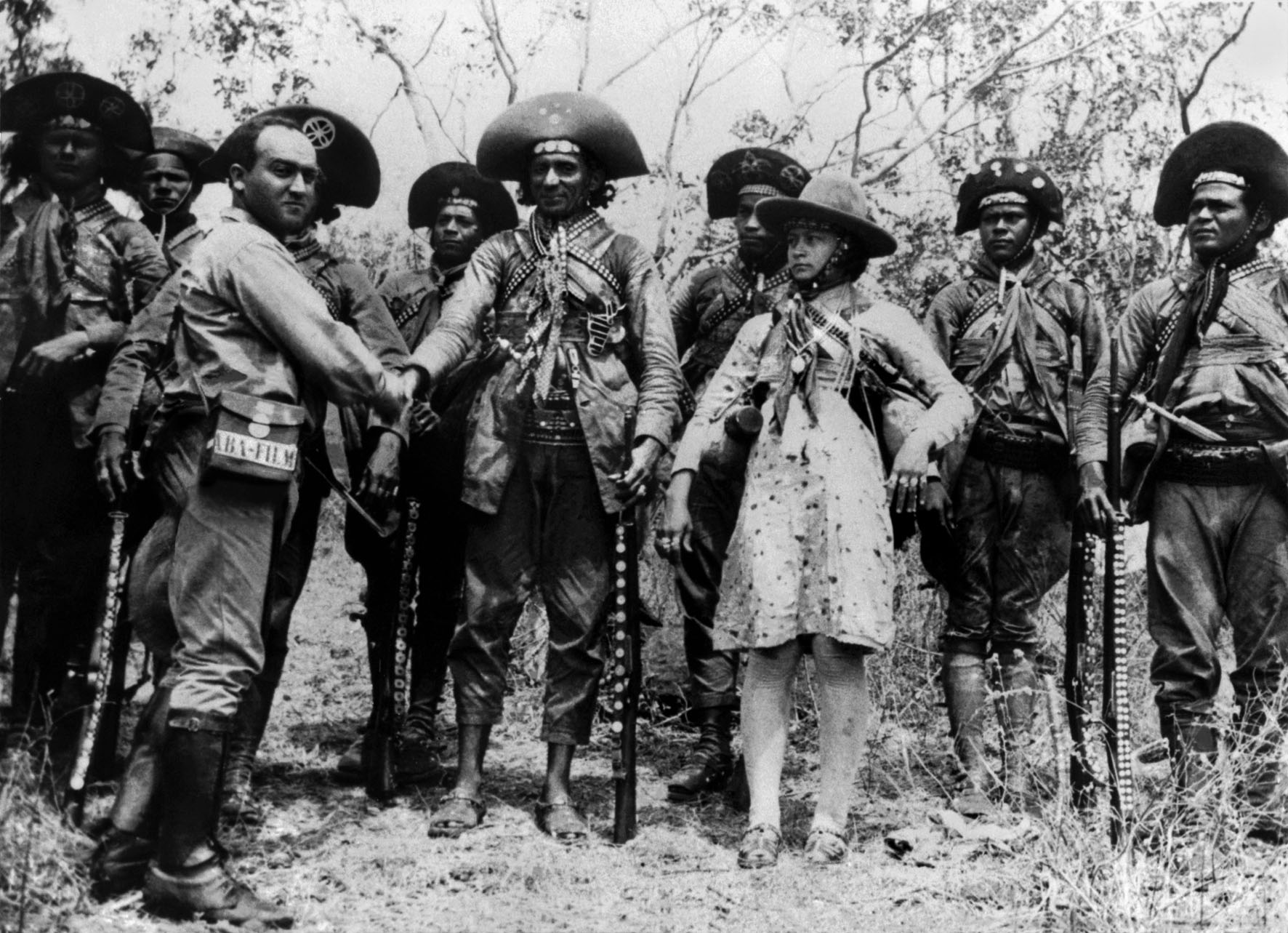
Lampião's outlaw band, wearing traditional sertanejo attire. The mythology built on the image of cangaceiros defines Brazil's view of the Sertão as a frontier.

Early Portuguese colonization of South America concentrated near the sea, being described by friar Vicente do Salvador as "crabs hugging the coast". As a result, Brazilian colonists developed their own idea of the continental hinterland as the Sertão, a massive and mysterious frontier thought to be either void of human life or plagued by indigenous raids, while tantalizingly full of untapped resources. With the coast dominated by sugar plantations in the 17th century, colonists known as Sertanejos expanded cattle raising into the interior of the Northeast through a series of wars against the native peoples known as the Barbarian Wars. The conquered area, roughly equal to the entire Caatinga biome, became a hub for Brazilian cattle raising and cotton production. After the Brazilian Great Drought of 1877–1878, the area became known for government mismanagement and violent outlaws that created the modern frontier mythology of the Cangaço.

=== Bandeiras ===
Brazilian regions with significant caipira cultural imprint in green, roughly corresponding with the areas that saw Bandeirante activity.

São Vicente was the first Portuguese settlement in South America, eventually leading to the creation of São Paulo dos Campos de Piratininga as the main Portuguese village above the Serra do Mar. This location isolated the inhabitants from contact with Portugal proper by the sea, while placing them at an advantageous position to access the Brazilian Highlands. These Paulistas developed a frontier culture known as Caipira, and engaged in expeditions to the continent's interior known as entradas and bandeiras. The goal of the expeditions were to enslave indigenous peoples in the deep interior and to look for rare minerals. Those who partook in these expeditions came to be known as Bandeirantes, and they raided Jesuit missions and indigenous villages alike.

The expeditions reached well beyond the Treaty of Tordesillas limits agreed by Portugal, including the destruction of the Spanish Guayrá province. Due to their reputation, Bandeirantes like Domingos Jorge Velho were often employed by Portuguese colonial officials to destroy resistance groups in the frontier, such as the main free Afro-Brazilian community in the Quilombo dos Palmares and indigenous confederations in the Northeast. The discovery of gold in Minas Gerais in 1690 and resulting gold rush created friction between the Bandeirantes, who claimed full ownership of the mines, and the Portuguese government and other colonists. The War of the Emboabas expelled the Bandeirantes from Minas Gerais, who continued their expeditions westward finding new gold mines in modern Goiás, Mato Grosso and Rondônia, with the Guaporé River marking the westernmost limit of Bandeirante activity, now thousands of miles from the original Tordesillas line. Wanting to secure the new valuable and rich western frontier, Portugal negotiated with Spain the Treaty of Madrid in 1750 to formally annex all Bandeirante conquests into the State of Brazil, adding up to almost half of South America, as compensation for Spain's violation of Tordesillas in the Philippines. The treaty also exchanged Colônia do Sacramento for Misiones Orientales, but the native Guaraní resistance to the Bandeirante raids against the missions escalated into the Guaraní War, undoing the treaty. Nevertheless, following the Independence of Brazil in 1822 and border conflicts with its neighbors, all Bandeirante conquests were recognized as Brazilian territory.

=== Amazon ===
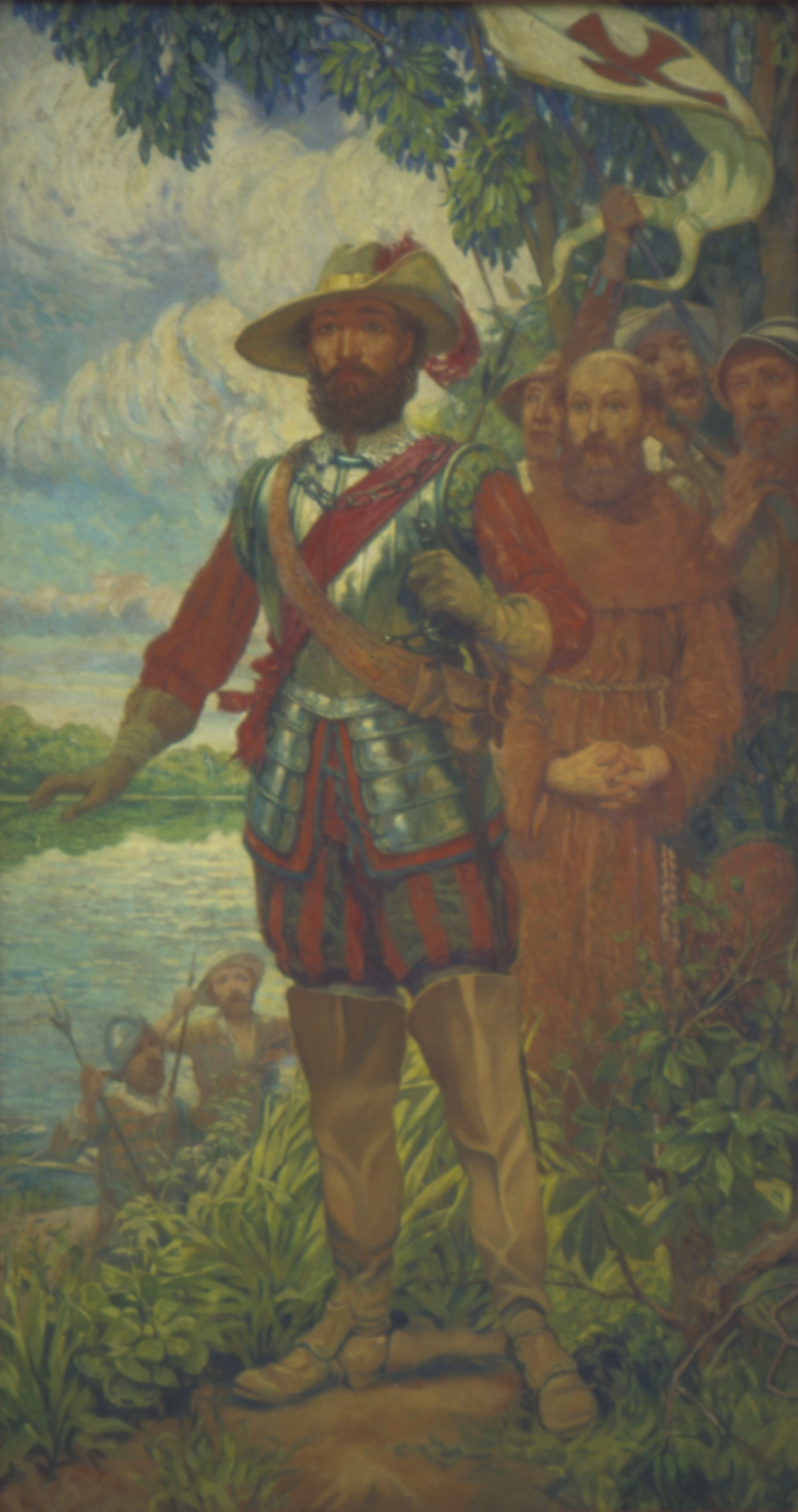
Posse da Amazônia, by Fernandes Machado (1924). Represents Pedro Teixeira taking possession of the Amazon for the Portuguese Empire.

The first Portuguese expedition into the Amazon happened in 1613 under Francisco Caldeira Castelo Branco, who founded the city of Belém to control the mouth of the Amazon River. In 1637 Pedro Teixeira carried out an expedition from Belém to Quito and claimed most of the Amazon basin for the Portuguese crown. Most colonial activity in the region were Portuguese Jesuit missions to convert native groups and the extraction of tropical goods like Brazil nuts, cocoa beans and guarana. Portuguese colonists would intermarry with local indigenous women, creating a unique Amazonian people known as Ribeirinhos. The Portuguese government, concerned about the Amazon's settlements vulnerability and lack of large economic activity compared to its other holdings in South America, detached them from the State of Brazil and created a second colony, the State of Maranhão to directly administer them. During this period the Atlantic slave trade was directed into the ports of Belém and São Luís, resulting in a significant black population in the territory. In 1775 the colonies were rolled back into the State of Brazil.

By independence, the Amazon became a source of international prestige for Brazil, as well as the least explored frontier. The precise borders with its neighbors were still undefined, including with the European powers in the Guianas. The late 19th century Amazon rubber cycle saw for the first time the Amazon become an attractive area for mass settlement of Brazilians. Tens of thousands of internal migrants worked extracting rubber for rubber barons, and cities like Manaus soared economically, becoming symbols of the Brazilian Belle Époque. The prosperity brought the need to finally settle the borders of the region for good, resulting in frontier skirmishes such as the Acre War, the Amapá Question and the Pirara Dispute. The end of the rubber boom would begin a decline in the region, identified by military strategists and federal politicians as a security risk due to the frontier not being fully settled. The Rubber soldiers program during World War II, the establishment of the Free Economic Zone of Manaus and the Trans-Amazonian Highway are all attempts by the Federal Government of Brazil to occupy and protect its claim to the Amazon frontier.

=== March to the West ===
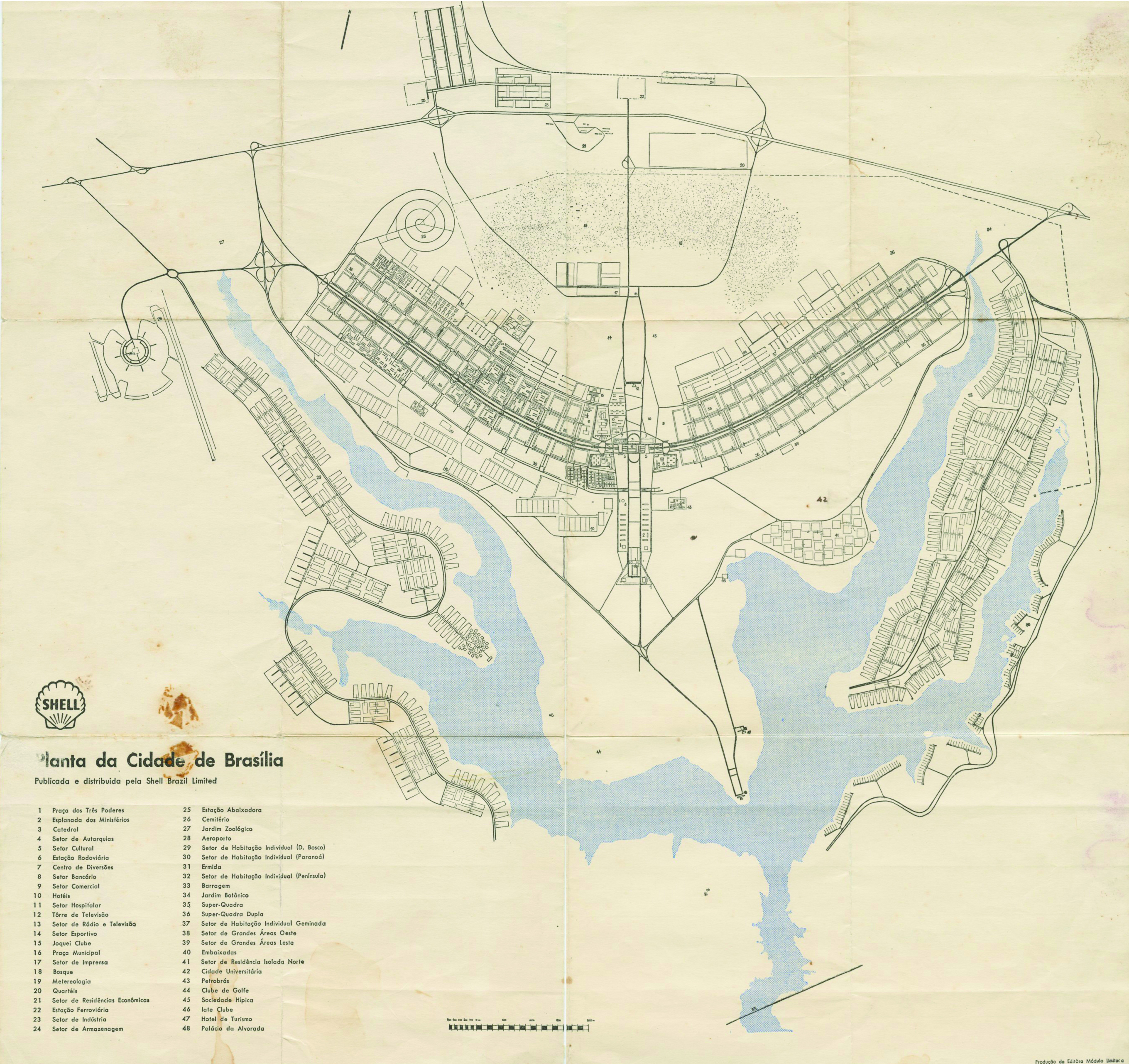
Brasília. The concept of a centralized capital located in the interior of Brazil to secure the frontier had been proposed since colonial times.

The March to the West was a political, economic and ideological programme idealized by President Getúlio Vargas during the 1930s. It perceived the sparsely populated frontiers of Brazil as a missed opportunity and security risk. Writer Cassiano Ricardo was the main ideologue of the project, combining the then popular influences of Brazilian Modernism and Brazilian nationalism into a romantic and deterministic narrative that placed the frontier as the great destiny of the Brazilian people. The ideological drive for Federal projects to populate the interior would be maintained throughout the Vargas era, the Fourth Brazilian Republic and even during the Military dictatorship. These projects included the establishments of the Federal territories of Brazil in the frontier, the Construction of Brasilia as the new capital, the building of the Itaipu Dam, creation of colonization companies like Sinop, and the Brazilian Agricultural Research Corporation to develop genetically modified crops that can grow in the Cerrado climate.

== Hispanic America ==
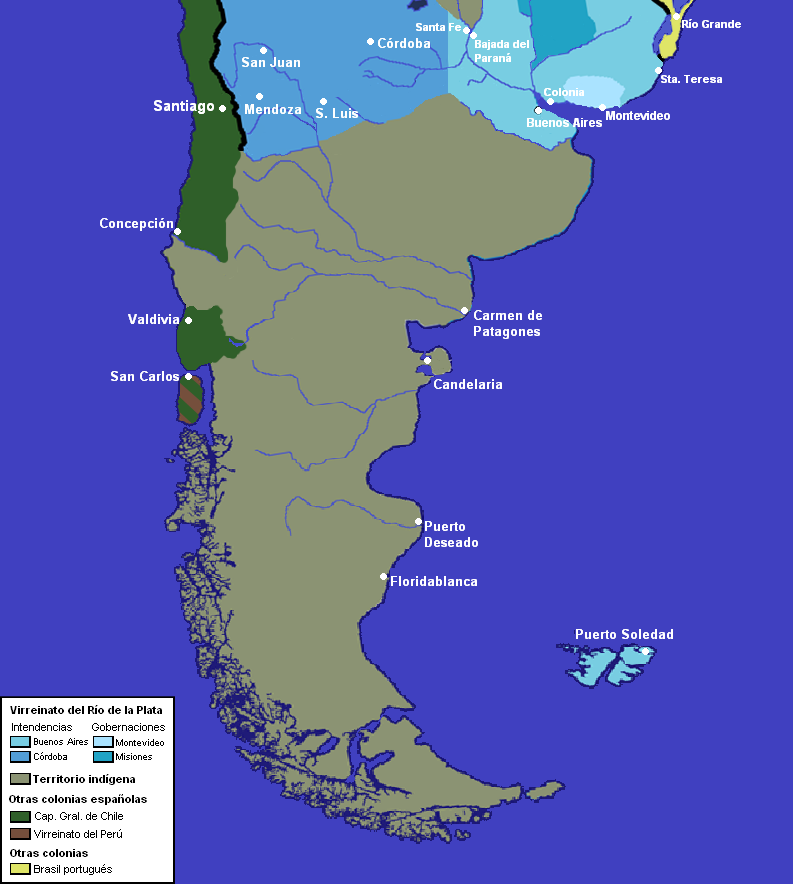
De facto Spanish territories and indigenous territories around 1800. Viceroyalty of the Río de la Plata is shown in blue while the Captaincy General of Chile is shown in green.

=== Argentina ===
The southern Indigenous frontier of the Viceroyalty of the Río de la Plata was the southern limit into which the Viceroyalty could exert its rule. Beyond this lay territories de facto controlled by Indigenous peoples who inhabited the Pampas and Patagonia. These group were mainly the Tehuelche, Pehuenche, Mapuche, and the Ranqueles.

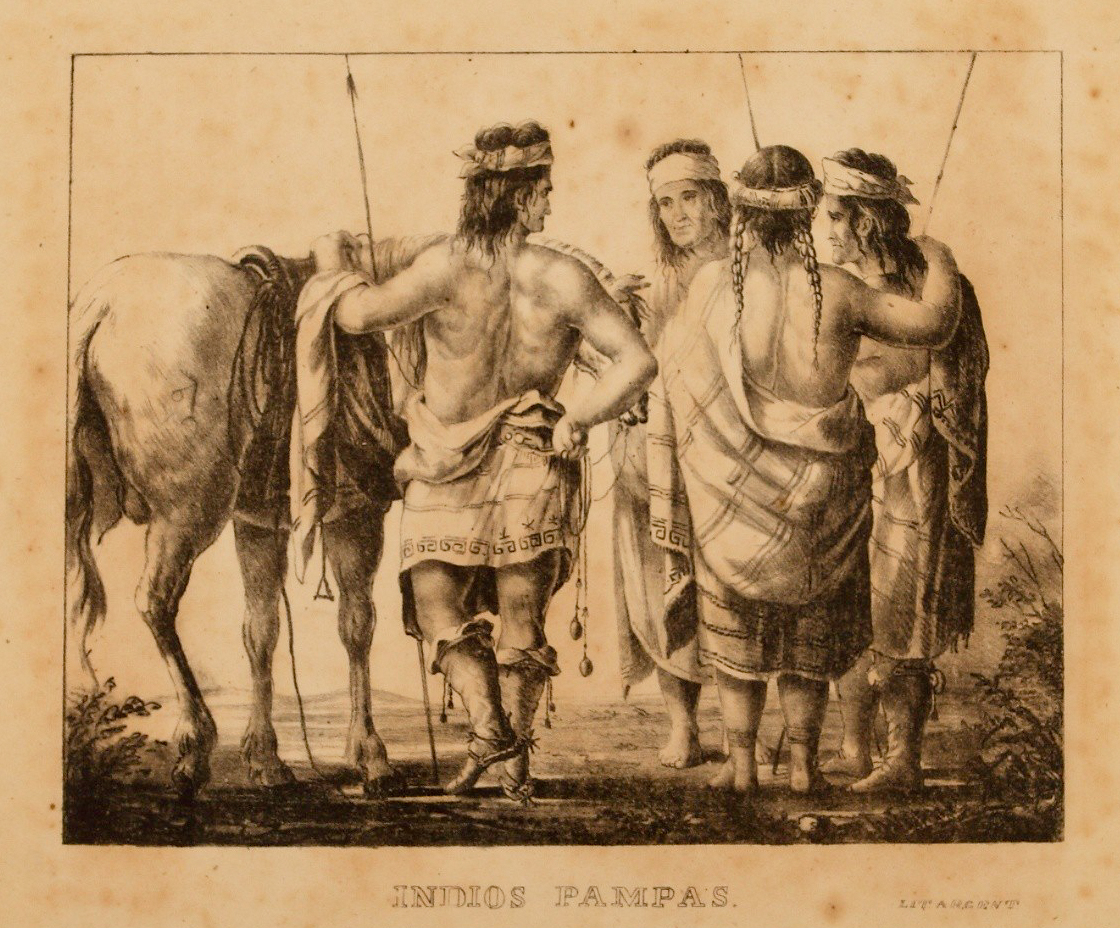
Carlos Morel, Indios pampas (Serie Ibarra). Siglo XIX. Visible: 25 x 28 cm Llitografía: 21 x 26,5 cm, litografía sobre papel

Various military campaigns and peace treaties were arranged by the Spanish in order to either stop indigenous incursions in Spanish lands or to advance the frontier into indigenous territory. In the 1870s, to counter the cattle raids (and the native peoples on horseback), Argentina constructed a deep trench, called Zanja de Alsina, to prevent cattle from being driven west and establish a boundary to the raiding tribes in the Pampas.

Under General Julio Argentino Roca, the Conquest of the Desert extended Argentine power into Patagonia.

=== Bolivia ===
For long time a frontier existed east of Tarija in southeastern Bolivia. Starting in the late 16th century, the Spaniards saw the tribes inhabiting the eastern jungles, and the "Chiriguanos" in particular, as a threat. This frontier attracted Maroons and Indigenous individuals who escaped Spanish rule in the Real Audiencia of Charcas. The frontier remained remarkably stable until the late 18th century when the Spanish made some advances into the Chiriguano territory. Later, in the second half of the 19th century a more definitive advance begun on the Chiriguano lands with the last resistance being crushed in the early 20th century. Aniceto Arce and other wealthy Bolivians gained control of lands of the defeated Ava Guaraní in the late 19th century establishing large cattle farming operations. Much of the cattle raised in eastern Chuquisaca was exported to Salta in Argentina and then across the Andes to the saltpeter works in Chile's Atacama Desert. Given the massivity of the cattle estates established Franciscan friar Angélico Martarelli argued around 1890 that the Chiriguano lands had been colonized by cattle rather than by settlers.

=== Chile ===
The Destruction of the Seven Cities (1599–1604) led to the formation of a frontier called La Frontera, with the Spaniards ruling north of Biobío River and Mapuche retaining independence south of the said river. Within this frontier the city of Concepción assumed the role of "military capital" of Spanish-ruled Chile. This informal role was given by the establishment of the Spanish Army of Arauco in the city which was financed by a payments of silver from Potosí called Real Situado. Santiago located at some distance from the war zone remained the political capital since 1578.

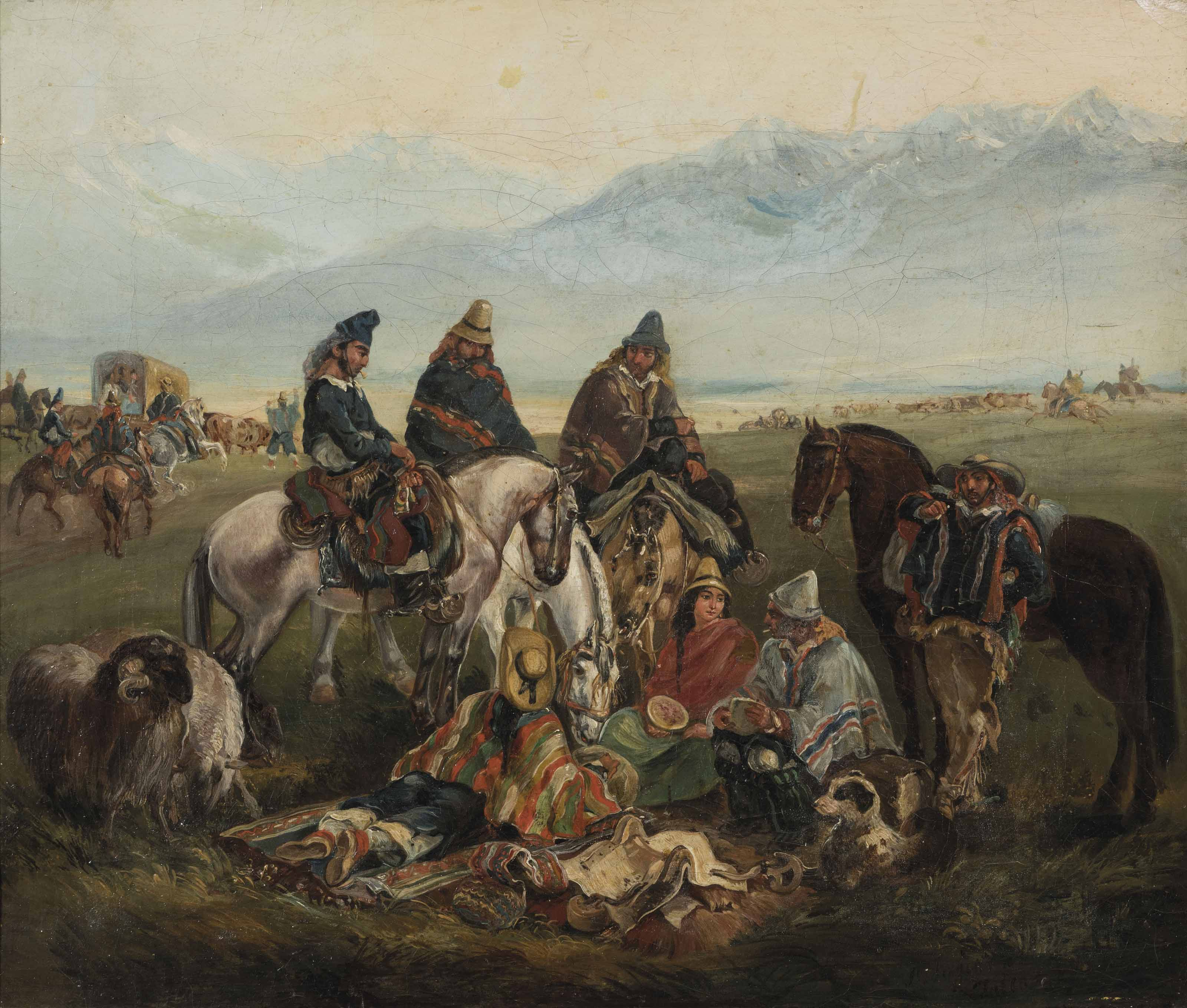
Chilean huasos, 1836, by Johann Moritz Rugendas

Following the Mapuche uprising of 1655 and abolition of Mapuche slavery in 1683 in the Spanish Empire trade across the frontier increased. Mapuche-Spanish and later Mapuche-Chilean trade increased further in the second half of the 18th century as hostilities decreased. Mapuches obtained goods from Chile and some dressed in "Spanish" clothing. Despite close contacts, Chileans and Mapuche remained socially, politically, and economically distinct. Spanish and later Chilean officials with the titles of comisario de naciones and capitán de amigos acted as intermediaries between the Mapuche and colonial and republican authorities.

During the Occupation of Araucanía the Republic of Chile advanced the frontier south from Bío Bío River to Malleco River where a well defended line of forts was established between 1861 and 1871.

Having decisively defeated Peru in the Battles of Chorrillos and Miraflores in January 1881, Chilean authorities turned their attention to the southern frontier in Araucanía seeking to defend the previous advances that had been so difficult to establish. The idea was not only to defend forts and settlements but also to advance the frontier all the way from Malleco River to Cautín River.

== United States ==
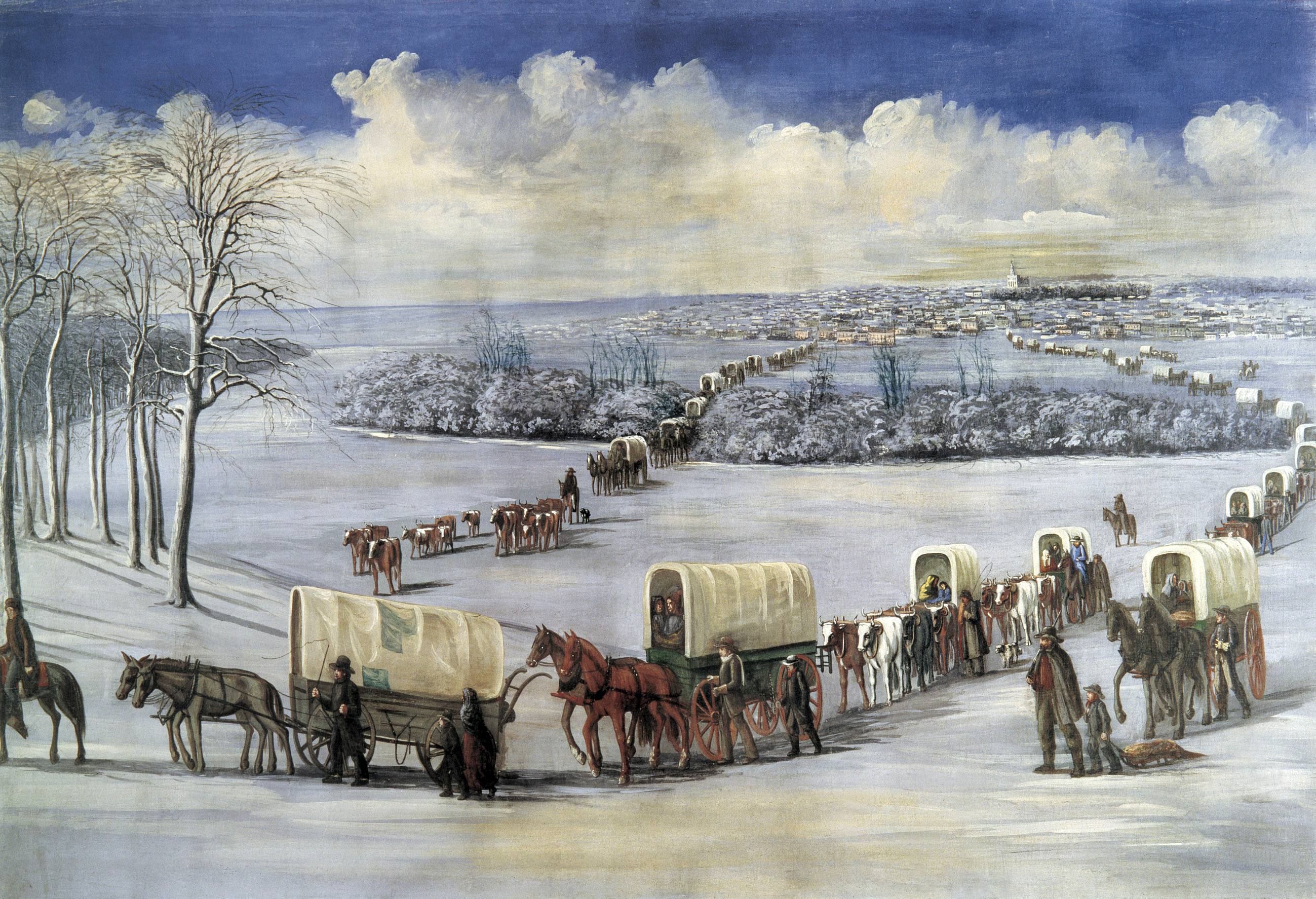
Mormon pioneers crossing the Mississippi in February 1846

In the United States, the frontier was the term applied by scholars to the impact of the zone of land beyond the region of existing European occupation. As pioneers moved into the frontier zone, they were changed significantly by the encounter what Frederick Jackson Turner called "the significance of the frontier." For example, Turner argued in 1893, one change was that unlimited free land in the zone was available and thus offered the psychological sense of unlimited opportunity, which in turn had many consequences, such as optimism, future orientation, shedding of restraints caused by land scarcity, and wastefulness of natural resources.

Operating in tandem with the doctrine of "manifest destiny", the "frontier" concept also had a massive impact on Native Americans like the declaration of terra nullius enacted by the British around 1835 to legitimize their colonization of Australia. The idea implicitly negated any recognition of legitimate pre-existing occupation and embodied a blank denial of land rights to the indigenous peoples whose territories were being annexed by European colonists.

Throughout American history, the expansion of settlement was largely from the east to the west and so the frontier is often identified with "the West." On the Pacific Coast, settlement moved eastward. In New England, it moved north.

"Frontier" was borrowed into English from French in the 15th century with the meaning "borderland," the region of a country that fronts on another country (see also marches). The use of frontier to mean "a region at the edge of a settled area" is a special North American development. (Compare the Australian "outback".) In the Turnerian sense, "frontier" was a technical term that was explicated by hundreds of scholars.

=== Colonial North America ===
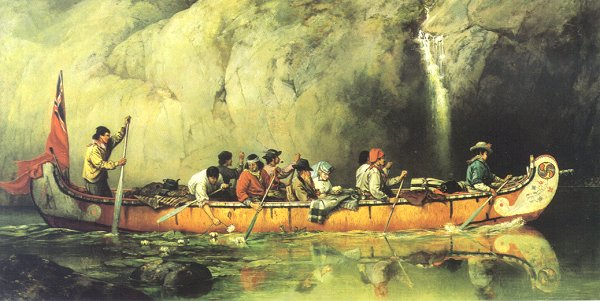
French-Canadian Voyageurs passing a waterfall

In the earliest days of European settlement of the Atlantic Coast, the frontier was essentially any part of the forested interior of the continent beyond the fringe of existing settlements along the coast and the great rivers such as the St. Lawrence, Connecticut, Hudson, Delaware, Susquehanna River, and James.

British, French, Spanish, and Dutch patterns of expansion and settlement were quite different from one another. Only a few thousand French migrated to Canada; the habitants settled in villages along the St. Lawrence River, built communities that remained stable for long stretches, and did not leapfrog west the way that the Americans would. Although French fur traders ranged widely through the Great Lakes and Mississippi River watershed, as far as the Rocky Mountains, they did not usually settle down. Actual French settlement in those areas was limited to a few very small villages on the lower Mississippi and in the Illinois Country.

Likewise, the Dutch set up fur trading posts in the Hudson River Valley, followed by large grants of land to patroons, who brought in tenant farmers who created compact permanent villages but did not push westward.

In contrast, the British colonies generally pursued a more systematic policy of widespread settlement of the New World for cultivation and exploitation of the land, a practice that required the extension of European property rights to the new continent. The typical British settlements were quite compact and small: under a square mile. Conflict with the Native Americans arose out of political issues on who would rule. Early frontier areas east of the Appalachian Mountains included the Connecticut River Valley. The French and Indian Wars of the 1760s resulted in a complete victory for the British, who took over the French colonial territory west of the Appalachians to the Mississippi River. The Americans began moving across the Appalachians into areas such the Ohio Country and the New River Valley.

=== American frontier ===
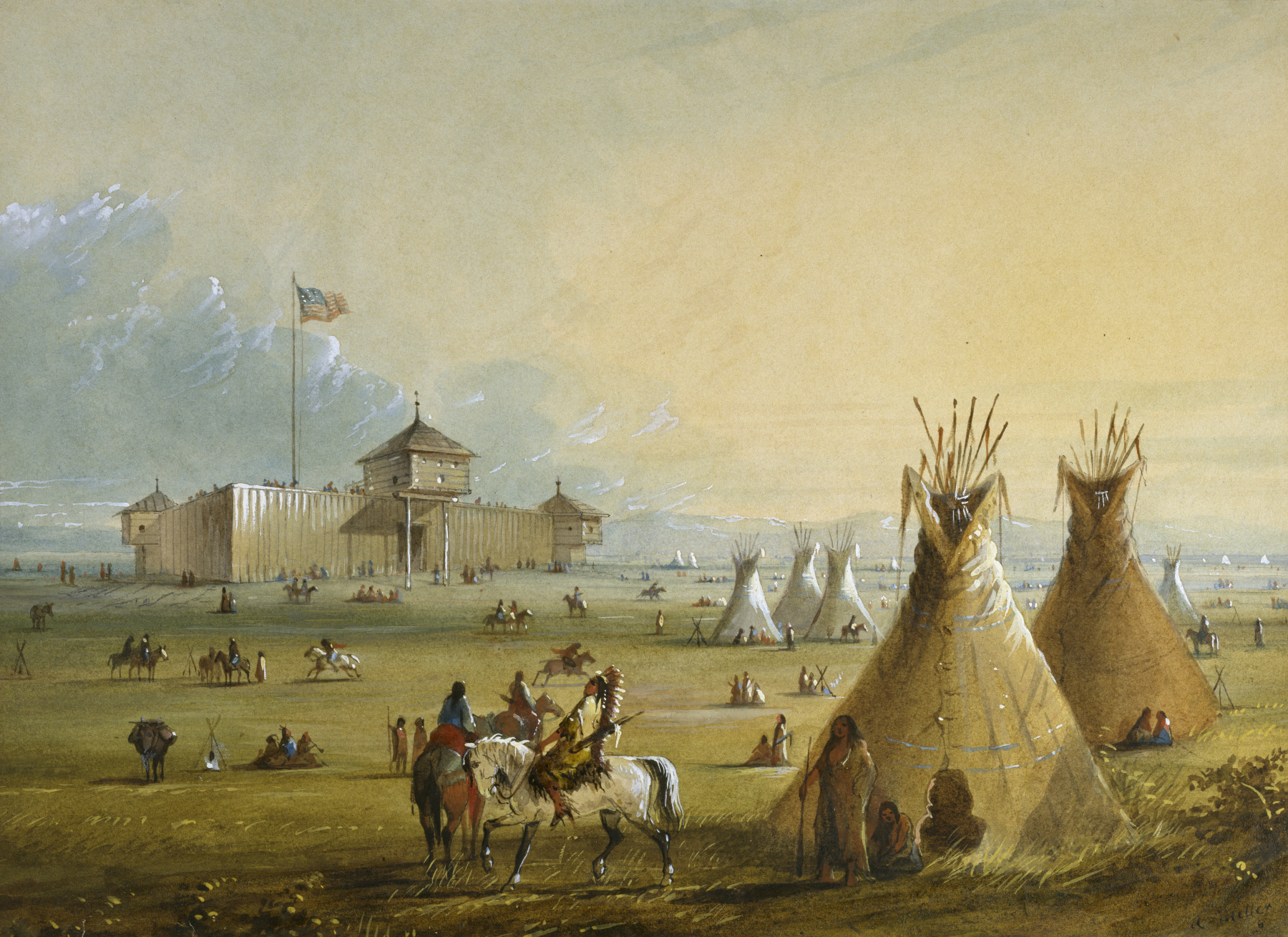
The first Fort Laramie as it looked prior to 1840. Painting from memory by Alfred Jacob Miller

After victory in the American Revolutionary War and the signing of the Treaty of Paris in 1783, the United States gained formal, if not actual, control of the British lands west of the Appalachians. Many thousands of settlers, typified by Daniel Boone, had already reached Kentucky and Tennessee and adjacent areas. Some areas, such as the Virginia Military District and the Connecticut Western Reserve (both in Ohio), were used by the states as rewards to veterans of the war. How to formally include the new frontier areas into the nation was an important issue in the Continental Congress in the 1780s and was partly resolved by the Northwest Ordinance (1787). The Southwest Territory saw a similar pattern of settlement pressure.

For the next century, the expansion of the nation into those areas, as well as the subsequently-acquired Louisiana Purchase, Oregon Country, and Mexican Cession, attracted hundreds of thousands of settlers. The question of whether the Kansas Territory would become "slave" or "free" helped to spark the American Civil War. In general before 1860, Northern Democrats promoted easy land ownership, and Whigs and Southern Democrats resisted the Homestead Acts for supporting the growth of a free farmer population that might oppose slavery and for depopulating the East.

When the Republican Party came to power in 1860, it promoted a policy of a free land, notably the Homestead Act of 1862, coupled with railroad land grants that opened cheap (but not free) lands for settlers. In 1890, the frontier line had broken up; census maps defined the frontier line as a line beyond which the population was under 2 persons per square mile.

The impact of the frontier in popular culture was enormous, as shown in dime novels, Wild West shows, and after 1910 Western films that were set on the frontier.

The American frontier was generally the edge of settlement in the West and typically was more democratic and free-spirited in nature than the East because of the lack of social and political institutions. The idea that the frontier provided the core defining quality of the United States was elaborated by the great historian Frederick Jackson Turner, who built his Frontier Thesis in 1893 around the notion.

== Canadian frontier ==
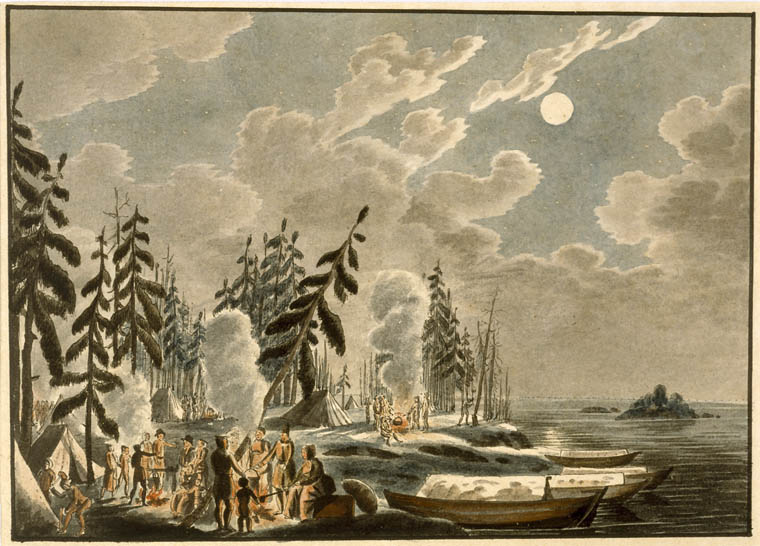
Swiss immigrants camped on the shores of Lake Winnipeg in the autumn of 1821

A Canadian frontier thesis was developed by the Canadian historians Harold Adams Innis and J. M. S. Careless, who emphasized the relationship between the center and periphery. Katerberg argues that "in Canada the imagined West must be understood in relation to the mythic power of the North". Innis's 1930 work The Fur Trade in Canada expounded on what became known as the Laurentian thesis: the most creative and major developments in Canadian history occurred in the metropolitan centres of Central Canada, and the civilization of North America is the civilization of Europe. Innis considered place to be critical in the development of the Canadian West and wrote of the importance of metropolitan areas, settlements, and indigenous people in the creation of markets. Turner and Innis have continued to exert influence over the historiography of the American and Canadian Wests. The Quebec frontier showed little of the individualism or democracy that Turner ascribed to the American zone to the south. The Nova Scotia and Ontario frontiers were more democratic than the rest of Canada, but whether that was caused by the need to be self-reliant on the frontier itself or the presence of large numbers of American immigrants is debated.

The Canadian political thinker Charles Blattberg has argued that such events ought to be seen as part of a process in which Canadians advanced a "border," as distinct from a "frontier," from east to west. According to Blattberg, a border assumes a significantly sharper contrast between the civilized and the uncivilized since unlike a frontier process in which the civilizing force is not supposed to be shaped by what it civilizes. Blattberg criticizes both the frontier and the border "civilizing" processes.

=== Canadian Prairies ===
The pattern of settlement of the Canadian Prairies began in 1896, when the American Prairies had already achieved statehood. Pioneers then headed north to the "Last Best West." Before the settlers began to arrive, the North West Mounted Police had been dispatched to the region. When the settlers began to arrive, a system of law and order was already in place, and the Dakotas' lawlessness that was famous for the American "Wild West" did not occur in Canada. The federal government had also sent teams of negotiators to meet with the indigenous peoples of the region. In a series of treaties, the basis for peaceful relations was established, and the long wars with the natives that occurred in the United States largely did not spread to Canada.

Like their American counterparts, the Canadian Prairies supported populist and democratic movements in the early 20th century.

== Russia ==
The expansion of Russia to the north, south (Wild Fields) and east (Siberia, the Russian Far East, and Russian Alaska) exploited ever-changing frontier regions over several centuries and often involved the development and settlement of Cossack communities.

== China ==
=== Xinjiang ===
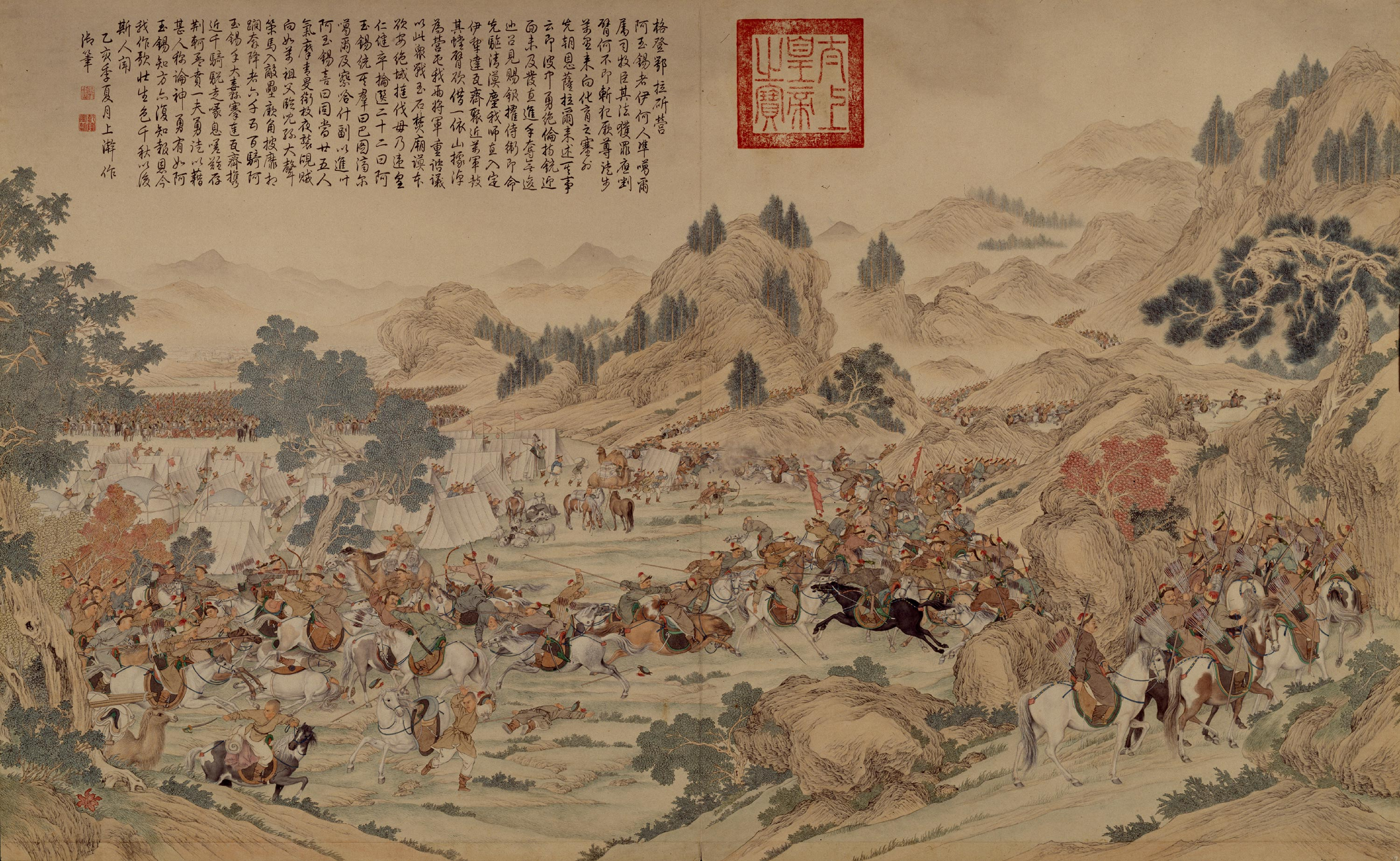
Storming of the Dzungar Camp at Gadan-Ola led by Ayusi in 1755

Xinjiang in Chinese literally means "New Frontier" or "New Territory" (Chinese: 新疆), and its previous full name was "Xiyu Xinjiang" (Chinese: 西域新疆; lit. 'new frontier of the Western Regions'), after Qing China conquered the region in 1759.

The transformation of Xinjiang into a Chinese frontier was decisively shaped by the Qing Empire's military conquest of the Dzungar Khanate in the 18th century, a series of campaigns often referred to as the Dzungar Wars (1687–1757). These brutal wars against the Mongol Buddhist Dzungars—who had built a powerful steppe polity stretching from the Altai to the Ili River—culminated in the near-total destruction of the Dzungar population through warfare, famine, disease, and state-sanctioned mass killings, which some historians characterize as genocidal. Following the conquest, the Qing initiated a large-scale demographic, military, and administrative reordering of the region. Vacated Dzungar lands in the north (Zhunbu) were repopulated with Manchus, Han Chinese, Mongols, and especially Uyghur Muslims from the south (Hui Muslims), laying the foundation for the modern ethno-geographic landscape of Xinjiang. This moment marks the beginning of Xinjiang as an imperial frontier—not just a militarized buffer against Central Asia and Russia, but a zone of active settler colonization, resource extraction, and frontier governance. The Qing's establishment of garrisons, banner systems, and dual administration over Muslim and nomadic populations illustrates the imperial strategy of managing diversity while extending sovereignty.

=== Guizhou ===
The northeastern part of Guizhou Province was called "Liangyou Xinjiang" (Chinese: 两游新疆; lit. 'new frontier of two prefectures') in early Qing Dynasty. During the reign of the Yongzheng Emperor (1722–1735), the Qing state undertook a more assertive and systematic effort to incorporate and develop Guizhou, a rugged, mountainous frontier province inhabited largely by non-Han ethnic groups such as the Miao and Buyi. This campaign reflected the broader Qing ambition to solidify imperial authority across its southwestern periphery. Yongzheng implemented the policy of gaitu guiliu (Chinese: 改土归流; lit. 'replacing chiefs into regular officials'), replacing hereditary native chieftains (tusi) with centrally appointed officials in order to strengthen bureaucratic control and undermine semi-autonomous indigenous governance.

== See also ==
- Cabin rights
- Marches
- Military Frontier
- Xinjiang under Qing rule
- North-West Frontier Province

== Bibliography ==
- Tapia Matamala, Orlando; Prieto Serrano, Carla (2023). "Colonización y resistencia chiriguana: la conquista del cañón Abatiri, provincia de Azero, sureste de Bolivia (1850-1890)". In Harambour, Alberto; Serje, Margarita (eds.). La Era del Imperio y las Fronteras de la Civilización en América del sur (in Spanish). Bogotá-Santiago: Ediciones UniAndes-Pehuén. pp. 339–364. ISBN 9789587985108.
