= Wreckage of San José =

1651 sinking of a Spanish ship in colonial Chile

The 1651 wreckage of San José and the subsequent killings and looting carried out by indigenous Cuncos was a defining event in Colonial Chile that contributed to Spanish–Cunco tensions that led to the Battle of Río Bueno and the Mapuche uprising of 1655.

== Background ==
The Spanish city of Valdivia was reestablished by the Spanish in 1645 following a 1643 Dutch attempt to establish a settlement in the location. By 1651, the Spanish settlement of Valdivia had grown into a military garrison and was tasked with constructing the Valdivian Fort System to defend against the Dutch or any other naval power that might attempt to retake the city. This was financed by the Real Situado, an annual payment of silver to strengthen the military of war-torn Chile. Because Valdivia was surrounded by hostile Mapuche territory, the only access was by sea. In January 1651, the Spanish and Mapuches celebrated the Parliament of Boroa, which renewed the fragile peace that had been established in the parliaments of Quilín of 1641 and 1647.

== Wreckage and aftermath ==
The Spanish ship San José, sailing to Valdivia, was pushed by storms on March 26 onto coasts inhabited by the Cuncos, a southern Mapuche tribe. The ship ran aground and, while most of the crew managed to survive the wreck, nearby Cuncos killed them and seized the valuable cargo. It included the payment to the garrison of Valdivia. According to Diccionario Geográfico de la República de Chile (1899), the site of the wreck was Punta Galera.

A subsequent Spanish expedition departed from Chiloé to recover the wreck. Led by Captain Gaspar de Alvarado, the divers of the expedition made unsuccessful attempts to recover the part of the cargo they thought was still in the wreck. Governor Acuña Cabrera was temporarily dissuaded from sending a punitive expedition from Boroa by Jesuits fathers Diego de Rosales and Juan de Moscoso, who argued that the murders were committed by a few Indians and warned the governor that renewing warfare would lose the gains obtained at Boroa. Being a peripheral southern group, the Cuncos had not taken part in the Spanish-Mapuche parliaments and the prospect of new hostilities was deemed to be detrimental to sustaining the peace with the tribes further north.

Punitive expeditions were sent against the Cunco nonetheless, one from Valdivia and one from Carelmapu. Forces under Governor of Valdivia Diego González Montero advanced south, but the Governor soon found that tribes he expected to join him as allies were indifferent and even misled him. His troops ran out of supplies and had to return to Valdivia. While González Montero was away, coastal Huilliches killed twelve Spanish and sent their heads to other Mapuche groups in southern Chile "as if they wanted to create a grand uprising" according to historian Diego Barros Arana. The expeditions were meant to meet at Bueno River, but the force from Valdivia failed to reach the rendezvous point. The expedition from Carelmapu led by Captain Ignacio Carrera Yturgoyen penetrated north to the vicinity of the ruins of Osorno, where they were approached by Huilliches who handed over three "caciques" that were allegedly responsible for the murders. The Spanish and local Huilliches assured each other of the benefits of peace. Then, the Spanish of Carelmapu executed the three accused, hanged them in hooks as a warning, and returned south. Spanish soldiers in Concepción, the "military capital" of Chile, were dissatisfied with the results. Barros Arana consider some may have pushed for renewed war for personal benefit.

== Bibliography ==
- Barros Arana, Diego. "Capítulo XIV". Historia general de Chile (in Spanish). Vol. Tomo cuarto (Digital edition based on the second edition of 2000 ed.). Alicante: Biblioteca Virtual Miguel de Cervantes.
- Montt Pinto, Isabel (1971). Breve Historia de Valdivia (in Spanish). Buenos Aires: Editorial Francisco de Aguirre. OCLC 1397610. Archived from the original on 18 February 2007.
