= Spanish ship San José =

A number of ships of the Spanish Navy have borne the name San José in honour of Saint Joseph

- San José, a ship carrying the silver treasure of Real Situado to Valdivia that wrecked in 1651 in the lands of the Cunco people.
- Spanish galleon San José (1698), a 60-gun galleon of the Armada de la Guardia de la Carrera de las Indias destroyed on 8 June 1708 (New Style) during Wager's Action off Cartagena de Indias, Colombia in the War of Spanish Succession
- San José y Las Animas, a New England-built 326-ton ship in the Spanish Treasure Fleet, sunk in a hurricane off the coast of Florida in 1733
- Spanish ship San José (1769), a 70-gun ship of the line built at Havana and wrecked (without casualties) at Brest in April 1780
- Spanish ship San José (1796), a polacca.
- Spanish ship San José (1783), a 112-gun ship of the line built at Ferrol, Spain, captured by the United Kingdom at the Battle of Cape St Vincent on 14 February 1797 and renamed HMS San Josef
