= Mapuche uprising of 1655 =

Anti-Spanish attacks in colonial Chile

- Part of the Arauco War
Date	February 14, 1655 – 1656
Location	Araucanía and lands north up to Maule River
Result	Boroa permanently abandoned; Lands between Bío Bío and Maule rivers ravaged; Large numbers of Mapuche slaves liberated; Governor Acuña Cabrera deposed twice

Belligerents
Mapuche rebels	Spanish Empire

Commanders and leaders
Clentaru; Alejo; Chicaguala; Lebupillan	Antonio de Acuña Cabrera; Juan de Salazar; Fernández de Rebolledo; Francisco de la Fuente Villalobos

The Mapuche uprising of 1655 (Spanish: alzamiento mapuche de 1655 or levantamiento mapuche de 1655) was a series of coordinated Mapuche attacks against Spanish settlements and forts in colonial Chile. It was the worst military crisis in Chile in decades, and contemporaries even considered the possibility of a civil war among the Spanish. The uprising marks the beginning of a ten-year period of warfare between the Spanish and the Mapuche.

== Background ==
=== Parliament of Boroa ===
Mapuches would have been unhappy with the terms of the Parliament of Boroa signed on January 24, 1651. Almost everything agreed then was in favour of the Spanish, including prohibition for the Mapuche to wear weapons unless the Spanish asked them to do so. Peace was first compromised only two months later by a new episode in the Spanish–Cunco conflict. Jesuit fathers Diego de Rosales and Juan de Moscoso wrote to Governor of Chile Antonio de Acuña Cabrera that renewing warfare on the Cuncos would evaporate gains obtained at Boroa. While the Spanish sent initially some minor punitive expeditions against the Cunco through this conflict the Spanish found that tribes that had pledged to come to their aid in war declined to join Spanish forces.

=== Spanish–Cunco conflict ===
The Cuncos, a peripheral southern Mapuche group, had a long history of conflict with the Spanish. Cuncos had previously forced the Spanish to abandon the city of Osorno in October 1602. The Cuncos were not present at the Parliament of Boroa. In March 1651, a Spanish ship was about to arrive to the newly re-established Spanish exclave of Valdivia when storms pushed the ship south into Cunco lands where it wrecked. The ship carried important supplies and salaries from the Real Situado which the Cuncos seized. Two punitive expeditions were assembled to advance on Cunco lands, one from Valdivia in the north and one from Carelmapu in the south. Governor of Valdivia Diego González Montero advanced south with his forces but soon encountered natives who were indifferent and even misled him. His troops ran out of supplies and had to return to Valdivia. Captain Ignacio Carrera Yturgoyen who advanced north from Carelmapu reached the site of the old city of Osorno. There he was approached by Huilliches who handed over three suspects who were killed. After this, the expedition of Carrera Iturgoyen returned south. The loot was never recovered despite the Spanish searching for the wreck. Overall the Spanish military was dissatisfied with the results.

=== Spanish slave hunting ===
Albeit there was a general ban of slavery of indigenous people by Spanish Crown the 1598–1604 Mapuche uprising that ended with the Destruction of the Seven Cities made the Spanish in 1608 declare slavery legal for those Mapuches caught in war. Mapuches "rebels" were considered Christian apostates and could, therefore, be enslaved according to the church teachings of the day. In reality, these legal changes only formalized Mapuche slavery that was already occurring at the time, with captured Mapuches being treated as property in the way that they were bought and sold among the Spanish. Legalisation made Spanish slave raiding increasingly common in the Arauco War.

The uprising took place in a context of increasing Spanish hostilities on behalf of maestre de campo Juan de Salazar who used the Army of Arauco to capture Mapuches and sell them into slavery. In 1654 a large slave-hunting expedition ended in a complete disaster at the Battle of Río Bueno. This setback did not stop the Spanish who under the leadership of Salazar organized a new expedition the summer of 1655. Salazar himself is said to have profited greatly from Mapuche slave trade and being brother-in-law of governor Antonio de Acuña Cabrera allowed him to exert influence in favour of his military campaigns.

As the slave raiding expedition of 1655 was being prepared indios amigos begun to express unease. Governor Acuña Cabrera was told by his wife Juana de Salazar this was all about rumours spread by some soldiers envious of her brother. Juan Ignacio Molina mentions toqui Clentaru as the main leader of the Mapuches forces.

== Uprising ==
The location of Spanish settlements and forts within the modern boundaries of Chile and Argentina. In red those that were destroyed or abandoned during the uprising.

=== 1655 ===
Salazar began his campaign on February 6 starting from the frontier fortress of Nacimiento. In all the expeditionary army was made up of 400–700 Spanish soldiers and larger number of indian auxiliaries, numbering in total 2000 men. Other estimates put the total at 2400 men. As in the year before the expedition was not aimed at the Mapuche next to the frontier but towards the so-called Cuncos who lived in Fütawillimapu south of Bueno River. On the morning of February 14, Mapuches all over southern Chile —from Osorno to Maule River— launched attacks against Spanish estancias, forts and individuals. Mapuche slaves rose against their masters, men were killed while women and children were held hostages. Livestock was stolen and houses set afire. Spanish forts were besieged. Overall the Spanish reported over 400 estancias between Bío Bío and Maule rivers being destroyed. Amidst the chaos some Mapuche insurgents ran into the city of Concepción penetrating as deep as two city blocks from the Plaza de Armas. Mapuches succeeded in isolating the city from the rest of the Spanish possessions but did not besiege it.

Arauco and Chillán were besieged. This last city was eventually evacuated by the Spanish. The audiencia in Santiago criticized the evacuation as an act of cowardice and prohibited Chillán's refugees to flee north beyond Maule River. That was meant so the Chillán refugees would return to repopulate the lands they fled. The fact that a smallpox epidemic broke out among the refugees was also a reason to limit their movement.

==== Evacuation of Buena Esperanza and Nacimiento ====
Acuña Cabrera ordered the evacuation of Buena Esperanza, this move was later criticized as Buena Esperanza was in a good condition to be defended. José de Salazar, brother of Juan, was in charge of the garrison of Nacimiento decided to evacuate the fortress in order to avoid a lengthy siege. The evacuation was made by boats and rafts drifting downstream Bío Bío River with the goal of reaching Buena Esperanza. Soon however they learned that Buena Esperanza had been evacuated. Plans were made instead to fortify themselves at San Rosendo, an abandoned fort. The Spanish rafts and boats were followed by about 4,000 hostile Mapuches on both sides of the river and ran aground near Santa Juana. All the 240 Spanish were subsequently killed.

==== The expedition return to Concepción ====
Juan de Salazar, whose forces made up the bulk of the Army of Arauco, learned about this when arriving near Mariquina, (Note: At the time Juan Manqueante was the cacique of Mariquina, he had been a Spanish ally since the repopulation of Valdivia and remained so until 1655.) far south from the main events of the uprising. Instead of returning north by land he proceeded south to Valdivia where he embarked with 360 and set sail for Concepción. This was possible as there were two ships in the harbour that had arrived with payments of Real Situado to the garrison that was constructing the Valdivian Fort System there. (Note: The city of Valdivia had been reestablished by the Spanish in 1645 following a 1643 Dutch attempt to establish a settlement in the location.) Remaining forces, 340 Spanish and 1700 Indian auxiliaries, were left reinforcing Spanish positions around Valdivia. Soon however the Indian auxiliaries deserted and returned to their homes. The reinforcements of Valdivia were however enough to repel attacks by the Cuncos.

The arrival by sea of Juan de Salazar's army remnants to Concepción allowed Fernández de Rebolledo to send 200 men by sea to evacuate Arauco. This done, De Rebolledo went on to defeat Mapuches near Concepción.

==== Reinforcements from Peru ====
Learning about the situation of Chile the newly appointed Viceroy of Peru Luis Enríquez de Guzmán sent a ship with provisions, armament and munitions to Chile.

=== 1656 ===
More ships from Peru arrived around new year, bringing more provisions, armament and munitions as well as 376 soldiers. Ahead of this reinforcement was the new governor Pedro Porter Casanate who assumed office on January 1, 1656.

Porter managed to have the Spanish from Santiago send troops to guard the area around Itata River. This allowed him to use the army at Concepción to defeat local Mapuches at San Fabián de Conuco on January 20, 1656. In February 1656 Porter sent an army of 700 foot soldiers and some cavalry to Boroa where a Spanish garrison had been besieged for ten months. The expedition easily repelled Mapuche attacks and rescued the Spanish at Boroa.

In 1656 the Mapuches of Santa María Island captured a ship and five Spanish crew that had anchored there.

==== Alejo's raids ====
As peace was returning to the devastated lands between Bío Bío and Maule rivers Alejo begun his raids the winter of 1656. Alejo had previously served the Spanish as a soldier but resented not being allowed to advance through the ranks because of him being a mestizo.

At the head of about 1000 warriors Alejo wiped out a Spanish column of 200 men aimed to reinforce the fort of Conuco. A few men were spared for prisoner exchange and human sacrifice to the pillan. Alejo's military successes were limited by his tendency to make rowdy celebrations after each victory, wasting valuable time.

The Pehuenches, a peripheral indigenous group, crossed the Andes at the headwaters of Maule River taking prisoners and stealing livestock. It is thought that this attack may have been coordinated by Alejo. Altogether, the campaigns of Alejo killed or captured 400 Spaniards.

== Conflict among the Spanish leadership ==
On February 20 a cabildo in Concepción declared Acuña Cabrera deposed as governor. However Acuña Cabrera went into hiding. Jesuits who hid him then persuaded Acuña Cabrera to issue a written resignation. Other leading Spanish figures who were the subject of discontent went also into hiding, a brother of Salazar who was a priest and the physician and oidor Juan de la Huerta Gutiérrez.

The choice of a new governor in Concepción fell between two military men; Juan Fernández de Rebolledo and Francisco de la Fuente Villalobos. De la Fuente Villalobos ended up being elected, but days later the Audiencia in Santiago rejected the removal of Acuña y Cabrera as unlawful. Local elites were not meant to depose governors named by the King of Spain. Meanwhile, De la Fuente Villalobos' appeasement policy towards the Mapuche rebels and his intent to negotiate was meeting severe opposition from other military commanders.

Given the support he had received from the Audiencia in mid-March, Acuña Cabrera appeared in public acting as governor again. He designated Fernández de Rebolledo to take charge of the army. De la Fuente Villalobos did not recognise the authority of Fernández de Rebolledo, nevertheless there were no clashes between the military under their commands.

The Viceroy of Peru learned about the conflicts and decided to remove Acuña Cabrera. The latter refused to acknowledge his dismissal, as he thought only the King of Spain could dismiss him. The viceroy appointed (Note: This was an unexpected appointment as admiral Pedro Porter Casanate was by chance in Lima.) Pedro Porter Casanate as governor of Chile and dispatched him ahead of 376 soldiers that would both reinforce the troops combating the uprising as well as quell any opposition to Porter's governorship. Porter was accompanied by Álvaro de Ibarra who was appointed to inquire into events as the trier of facts, with a mission to establish responsibilities for the political turmoil.

== Bibliography ==
- Alcamán, Eugenio (1997). "Los mapuche-huilliche del Futahuillimapu septentrional: Expansión colonial, guerras internas y alianzas políticas (1750–1792)" (PDF). Revista de Historia Indígena (in Spanish) (2): 29–76. Archived from the original (PDF) on December 28, 2013.
- Alonqueo, Martín (1996). Hidalgo L., Jorge; Schiappacasse F., Virgilio; Niemeyer F., Hans; Aldunate del S., Carlos; Mege R., Pedro (eds.). Culturas de Chile (in Spanish). Vol. 2. Editorial Andrés Bello. ISBN 956-13-1437-1.
- Barros Arana, Diego. Historia general de Chile (in Spanish). Vol. Tomo cuarto (Digital edition based on the second edition of 2000 ed.). Alicante: Biblioteca Virtual Miguel de Cervantes.
- Foerster, Rolf (1993). Introducción a la religiosidad mapuche (in Spanish). Editorial universitaria.
- Molina, J. Ignatius (1809). The Geographical, Natural and Civil History of Chili.
- Montt Pinto, Isabel (1971). Breve Historia de Valdivia (in Spanish). Buenos Aires: Editorial Francisco de Aguirre. OCLC 1397610. Archived from the original on February 18, 2007.
- Pinochet Ugarte, Augusto; Villaroel Carmona, Rafael; Lepe Orellana, Jaime; Fuente-Alba Poblete, J. Miguel; Fuenzalida Helms, Eduardo (1997). Historia militar de Chile (in Spanish) (3rd ed.). Biblioteca Militar.
- Valenzuela Márquez, Jaime (2009). "Esclavos mapuches. Para una historia del secuestro y deportación de indígenas en la colonia". In Gaune, Rafael; Lara, Martín (eds.). Historias de racismo y discriminación en Chile (in Spanish).
