= Alonso de Figueroa y Córdoba =

Royal Governor of Chile

Alonso de Figueroa y Cordova (1589? in Spain – 1652) was a Spanish soldier who, in the days of the reign of Philip IV of Spain, temporarily carried out the position of Captain General and Royal Governor of Chile, besides president of its Real Audiencia of Chile. His government lasted for 13 months, between April 1649 and May 1650. He was the grandfather of the Chilean historian Pedro de Cordoba y Figueroa.

== Early life ==
Figueroa was born in Cordoba and became a soldier in Lisbon. He arrived in Chile at the age of 16 years, in 1605, enlisted in the company of captain Bartolome Paez Clavijo, in the thousand-man reinforcement for the Captaincy General of Chile brought from the Iberian Peninsula by general Antonio de Mosquera to support the Arauco War. In the following years he rose through the ranks of the army of the Mapuche frontier. He was an alferez and captain of infantry and cavalry; becoming general commissioner of cavalry, finally reaching the rank of maestre de campo in 1625. He was also Corregidor of Concepcion during the government of Laso de la Vega. The governor Martín de Mujica y Buitrón showed his confidence in him, naming him shortly before dying of apparent poisoning to the key position of Governor of Valdivia.

== Governorship ==
His appointment as Governor of Chile was one of the last administrative acts of the viceroy of Peru Pedro Alvarez de Toledo y Leiva, Marquess of Mancera, who sent to Chile a list of three possible names. Figueroa was the only one alive among the names, and was formally invested in Concepcion in May 1649. He apparently arranged to start a new military campaign against the Mapuches and communicated with Peru asking for major resources. In Lima the new viceroy García Sarmiento de Sotomayor, Conde de Salvatierra, decided not to confirm Figueroa in his position in July 1649. This rejection discouraged Figueroa from his more ambitious projects. But the continuation of hostilities soon forced to him to put military columns in movement. On December 24, a fort near Valdivia was assaulted by the neighboring natives, guided by a deserter from the Spanish army. The attack was a Mapuche success, because almost all the garrison died and those that lived were taken prisoners and the palisade was set afire. More to the south, the Jesuit Agustín Villaza was kidnapped.

Figueroa moved troops into the neighborhood of Valdivia and Boroa. In addition he disembarked a respectable force in Carelmapu, under the command of just named Governor of Chiloé, Ignacio de la Carrera Iturgoyen, with instructions to land on the continent and to face the tribes near Osorno.

This was the situation of the captaincy general on 4 May 1650, when the ship brought the new governor, Francisco Antonio de Acuña Cabrera y Bayona to Concepcion, ending the government of Figueroa. Figueroa y Córdoba was later named president of the Audiencia of Santa Fe de Bogota in 1652, but news of that appointment found him already dead.

== Sources ==
- José Toribio Medina, Diccionario biográfico colonial de Chile, Impr. Elziviriana, Santiago, 1906, Pj. 210–211.
- Guillermo Coz y Méndez, Historia de Concepción, Biblioteca Virtual Miguel de Cervantes, Alicante, 2002 Archived 2019-11-16 at the Wayback Machine

Government offices
Preceded by Martín de Mujica y Buitrón	Royal Governor of Chile; 1649–1650	Succeeded by Francisco Antonio de Acuña Cabrera y Bayona
