= Juan de Moscoso =

Juan Moscoso († 1663, Valdivia) was a Chilean criollo Jesuit. He was fluent in Spanish and Mapudungun. Together with fellow Jesuit Diego de Rosales Moscoso dissuaded governor Governor of Chile Antonio de Acuña Cabrera to launch new punitive expeditions against the Cunco in 1653. They argued that the murders were committed by a few Indians and warned the governor that renewing warfare would evaporate gains obtained at Boroa.

== Bibliography ==
- Barros Arana, Diego. "Capítulo XIV". Historia general de Chile (in Spanish). Vol. Tomo cuarto (Digital edition based on the second edition of 2000 ed.). Alicante: Biblioteca Virtual Miguel de Cervantes.
- Vicuña Mackenna, Benjamín (1989). "Vida de Diego de Rosales". Historia general del Reino de Chile, Flandes Indiano (in Spanish). Vol. Tomo I (2nd ed.). Santiago de Chile: Editorial Andrés Bello.
