= Francisco Antonio de Acuña Cabrera y Bayona =

Spanish soldier and politician (1597–1662)

Francisco Antonio de Acuña Cabrera y Bayona (Spain; 1597 – Lima; 1662) was a Spanish soldier and governor of the Captaincy General of Chile between 1650 and 1656. He was son of Antonio de Cabrera y Acuña y de Agueda de Bayona, who was a knight of the Order of Santiago and a professional military man. After serving in Flanders and France, he went to Peru as Maestre de Campo of El Callao and a general, being designated later Royal Governor of Chile. He was married to Juana de Salazar.

== Governor of Chile ==
An ambitious man and badly advised by his relatives and friends, his government was characterised by continuous difficulties with the natives and the vecinos of Concepción. In the Parliament of Boroa (1651) he reached a peace accord with the indigenous people that was broken within two years. Relations begun to strain when Cuncos, a southern Mapuche group, killed Spanish shipwreck survivors. The valuable cargo, aimed for the newly re-established city of Valdivia was never recovered. Albeit punitive expeditions were sent from Valdivia and Carelmapu, the Spanish were dissatisfied with the results. Governor Acuña Cabrera was temporarily dissuaded to take further action by Jesuits Diego de Rosales and Juan de Moscoso who argued that the murders were committed by a few Indians and warned the governor that renewing warfare would evaporate gains obtained at Boroa.

The followers of the Governor led by his brother-in-law Juan de Salazar went into Mapuche territory with the aim to profit from the war by taking captured Mapuches as slaves. The failure of the 1654 expedition at the Battle of Río Bueno and the indigenous revolt of 1655, motivated the vecinos of Concepcion to declare the deposition of Acuña to the shouts of ' The king lives! The bad governor dies!', an action that was not accepted by the Cabildo of Santiago, the Audiencia and the Junta de Guerra, that re-established Acuña in control.

Given these circumstances, the Viceroy of Peru sent for him to appear before him. Acuña did not accept the order. A new governor Pedro Porter Casanate, was appointed, and his first mission was to force the return of Acuña to Lima, where he would die shortly afterwards.

Government offices
Preceded by Alonso de Figueroa	Royal Governor of Chile; 1650–1656	Succeeded by Pedro Porter
