= Juan Ignacio de la Carrera Yturgoyen =

Chilean politician (1620–1682)

Royal Governor of Chiloé
- In office 1650–1653
- Monarch: Philip IV

Governor of Valdivia
- In office 1671–1673
- Monarch: Charles II

Personal details
- Born: Juan Ignazio Karrera Iturgoien; 31 July 1620 Alegia, Kingdom of Navarre
- Died: 27 March 1682 (aged 61) Santiago, Captaincy General of Chile
- Spouse: Catalina de Elguea y Cáceres (m. 1655; died 1677)
- Children: 13 including Francisco Juan de la Carrera y Elguea; José Miguel de la Carrera y Elguea
- Relatives: Carrera family
- Profession: Soldier

Military service
- Allegiance: Spanish Empire
- Rank: Maestre de campo
- Conflict: Arauco War; Punitive expedition against the Cunco

Juan Ignacio de la Carrera Yturgoyen (31 July 1620 – 27 March 1682) was a Spanish soldier known for his career in colonial administration of Chile and for being the original patriarch of the Carrera family, a family that had outstanding public participation during the nineteenth century, especially during the Independence of Chile.

== Early life ==
Carrera was born on 31 July 1620 in Alegia, Kingdom of Navarre (present-day, Basque Country, Spain) to Juan de la Carrera Lapaza and Francisca de Iturgoyen y Amasa. Carrera was baptised on 31 August 1620.

Carrera arrived in Concepción on 4 April 1639 whilst serving as retinue to Francisco López de Zúñiga, 2nd Marquess of Baides.

== Career ==
During his political career he held the following roles:

- Mayor of Santiago in 1655 during the Great Uprising
- Field Master of the Royal Army in 1656 and 1668.
- Encomendero of Peteroa and Malloa of March 26, 1656, (vacated by the death of Luis Jufré).
- Founding of Fort de la Encarnación in 1666
- Knight of the Order of Alcántara 1663
- Governor of the Royal Arms 1663, 1669
- Governor of Valdivia 1671–1673
- Mayor of Santiago in 1676.

== Personal life ==
In 1655, Carrera married Catalina de Elguea y Cáceres, the great-great-granddaughter of Diego García de Cáceres, with whom he had ten children. Carrera fathered three illegitimate children.
