= Destruction of the Seven Cities =

1598 destruction of seven Spanish settlements in South America

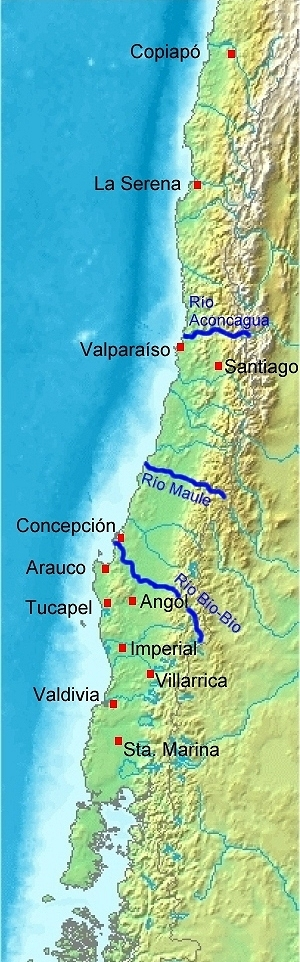
Settlements of the Conquistadores before the Destruction of the Seven Cities

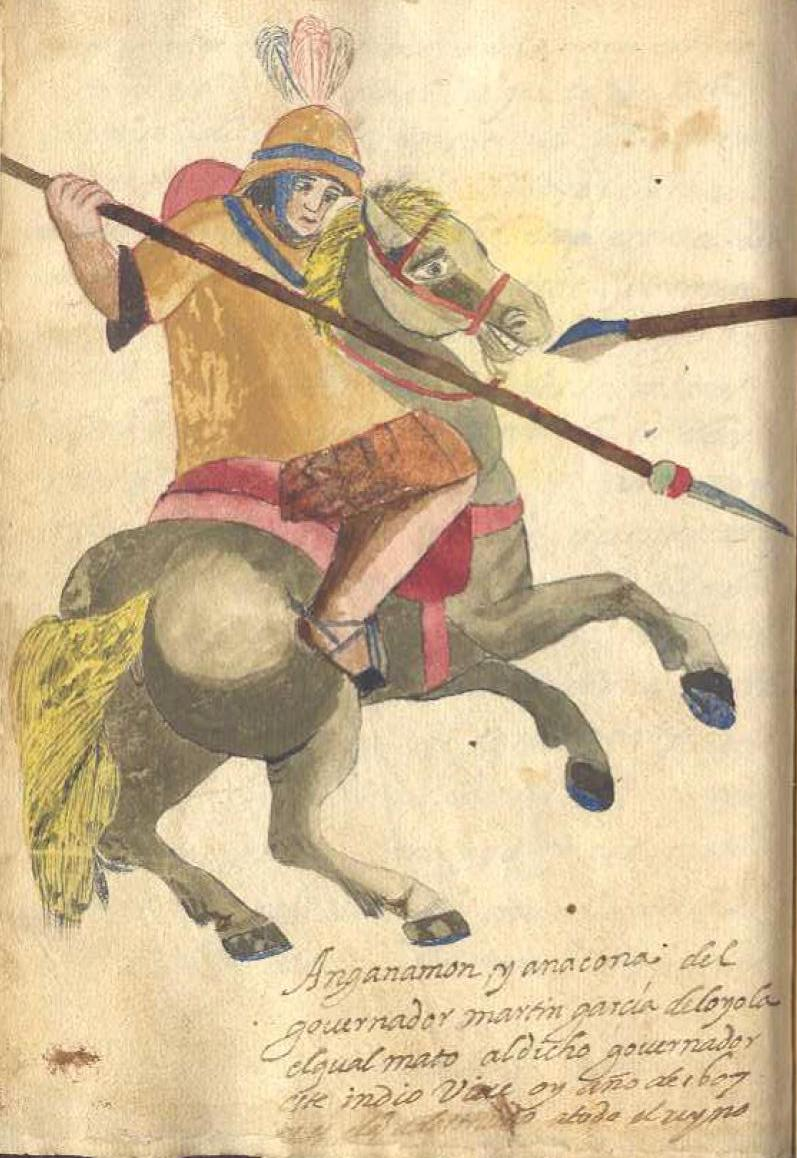
Anganamón a key Mapuche leader in the Destruction of the Seven Cities. Image from the book Relación del viaje de Fray Diego de Ocaña por el Nuevo Mundo (1599-1605).

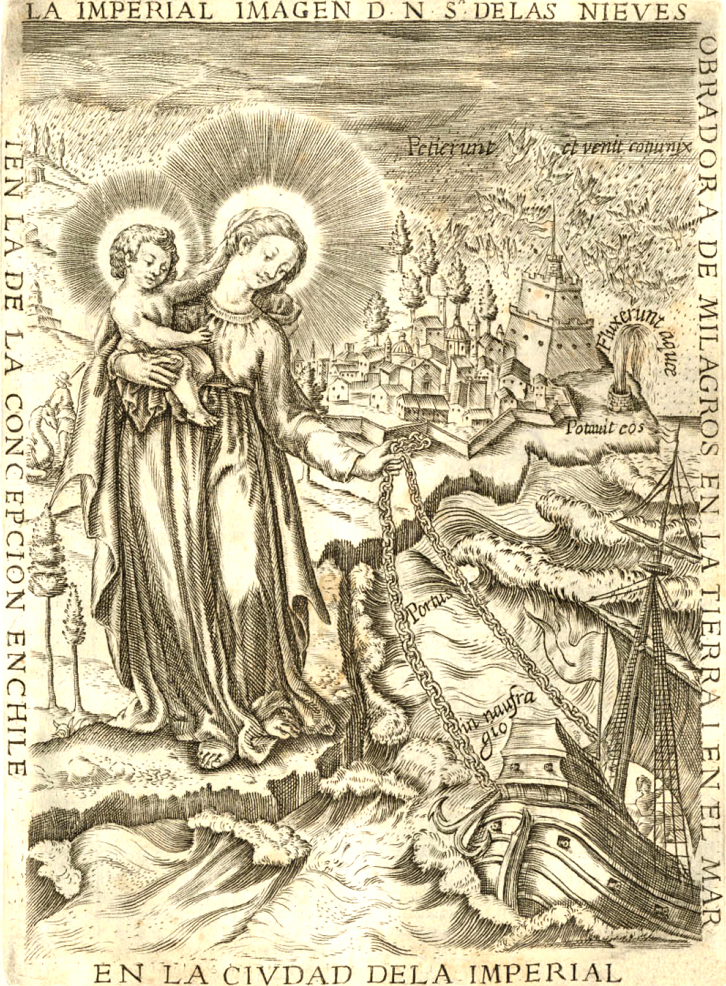
A 1646 illustration of La Imperial, one of the Spanish colonial cities destroyed by the Mapuches.

The Destruction of the Seven Cities (Spanish: Destrucción de las siete ciudades), in Chilean historiography was the destruction or abandonment of seven major Spanish outposts in southern Chile around 1600, caused by the Battle of Curalaba, a Mapuche and Huilliche uprising in 1598. The Destruction of the Seven Cities, in traditional historiography, marks the end of the Conquest period and the beginning of the proper colonial period.

The Destruction of the Seven Cities had a long-lasting impact on the history of the Mapuche and the history of Chile, determining the shape of future Colonial Spanish–Mapuche relations, e.g. by causing the development of a Spanish–Mapuche frontier.

== Course of events ==
Decades prior to these events, some conquistadors and settlers recognised the fragility of Spanish rule in southern Chile. In 1576, Melchior Calderón wrote to the king of Spain arguing for diminishing the number of cities in southern Chile by merging them, he proposed to merge Concepción, Angol, and Tucapel into one and La Imperial and Villarrica into another one.

The revolt was triggered by the news of the Battle of Curalaba on 23 December 1598, where the vice toqui Pelantaru and his lieutenants, Anganamón and Guaiquimilla, with three hundred men ambushed and killed the Spanish governor Martín García Óñez de Loyola and nearly all his companions.

Over the next few years, the Mapuche were able to destroy or force the abandonment of many cities and minor settlements including all seven of the Spanish cities in Mapuche territory south of the Biobío River: Santa Cruz de Coya (1599), Santa María la Blanca de Valdivia (1599, reoccupied in 1602 and abandoned again in 1604), San Andrés de Los Infantes (1599), La Imperial (1600), Santa María Magdalena de Villa Rica (1602), San Mateo de Osorno (1603), and San Felipe de Araucan (1604).

== Death toll and fate of captives ==
Contemporary chronicler Alonso González de Nájera writes that Mapuches killed more than 3,000 Spanish and took over 500 women as captives. Many children and Spanish clergy were also captured. Skilled artisans, renegade Spanish, and women were generally spared by the Mapuches. In the case of the women it was, in the words of González de Nájera, "to take advantage of them" (Spanish: aprovecharse de ellas).

While some Spanish women were recovered in Spanish raids, others were set free only in agreements following the Parliament of Quillín in 1641. Some Spanish women became accustomed to Mapuche life and stayed voluntarily among the Mapuche. The Spanish understood this phenomenon as a result either of women's weak character or their shame at having been abused. Women in captivity gave birth to a large number of mestizos, who were rejected by the Spanish, but accepted among the Mapuches. These women's children may have had a significant demographic impact on Mapuche society, which had been ravaged by war and epidemic disease.

The capture of women during the Destruction of the Seven Cities initiated a tradition of abductions of Spanish women in the 17th century by Mapuches.

== Aftermath ==
=== Central Chile becomes the Spanish heartland ===
The collapse of the Spanish cities in the south following the battle of Curalaba (1598) meant, for the Spaniards, the loss of their main sources of gold and indigenous labor. After those dramatic years, the colony of Chile became concentrated in Central Chile, which was increasingly populated, explored and economically exploited. Much land in Central Chile was cleared with fire during this period. On the contrary, open fields in southern Chile were overgrown as indigenous populations declined due to diseases introduced by the Spanish and intermittent warfare. The loss of the cities meant Spanish settlements in Chile became increasingly rural, with the hacienda growing in economic and social importance.

The establishment of a Spanish-Mapuche frontier in the south made Concepción assume the role of "military capital" of Chile. This informal role was given by the establishment of the Spanish Army of Arauco in the city which was financed by a payments of silver from Potosí called Real Situado. Santiago located at some distance from the war zone remained the political capital since 1578.

=== Chiloé, Indios reyunos, Carelmapu and Calbuco ===
When Valdivia and Osorno were destroyed, Spanish settlers and loyal yanakuna marched south, evading hostile Cuncos and Huilliches. Reaching Chacao Channel next to Chiloé, the refugees were assigned to two new settlements, Calbuco and Carelmapu. Yanakuna loyal to the Spanish in these difficult times were rewarded with exemption from encomienda labour, and formed into a militia with a salary from the Real Situado. Thus, they became known as Indios reyunos, literally meaning "Royal Indians" or "Kingly Indians". 300 of the initial 600 indios reyunos settled in Calbuco.

The Destruction of the Seven Cities reduced the settlements at Chiloé to an exclave, cut off from the remainder of Spanish Chile. The region, therefore, developed as an isolated and highly peripheral Spanish outpost.

=== Dutch interest in Valdivia ===
The abandoned city of Valdivia turned into an attractive site for Spain's enemies to control since it would allow them to establish a base amidst Spain's Chilean possessions. Recognizing this situation the Spanish attempted to reoccupy Valdivia in the 1630s but were thwarted by hostile Mapuches. The Dutch briefly occupied Valdivia in 1643. Having been told that the Dutch had plans to return to the location, the Spanish viceroy in Peru sent 1,000 men in twenty ships (and 2,000 men by land, who never made it) in 1644 to resettle Valdivia and fortify it.

=== Spanish reflections on the war ===
The precarity of Spanish control over Chile in the 17th century prompted comparison to the Eighty Year's War, with Chile, in the view of Diego de Rosales, having turned into an "Indian Flanders" (Flandes indiano). Purén indómito, a contemporary literary chronicle (1598–1600) which describes the events surrounding the Destruction of the Seven Cities, is notable for its realistic and unvarnished commentary, and for its criticism of both Spanish and Mapuche actions. Purén indómito, along with the military analysis presented by La guerra de Chile (published in 1647), challenged the prevailing Spanish tendency to view of the conquest of Chile as an "epic" series of "victories".

== See also ==
- Arauco War

== Sources ==
- Barros Arana, Diego (2000) [1884]. Historia General de Chile (in Spanish). Vol. III (2 ed.). Santiago, Chile: Editorial Universitaria. ISBN 956-11-1535-2.
- Bengoa, José (2003). Historia de los antiguos mapuches del sur (in Spanish). Santiago: Catalonia. ISBN 956-8303-02-2.
- Diego de Rosales, Historia General del Reino de Chile, Flandes Indiano, 3 tomos. Valparaíso 1877 - 1878.
  - Historia general de el Reyno de Chile: Flandes Indiano Vol. 2 Libro V La Ruina de las Siete Ciudades
- Crescente Errázuriz, Seis años de la historia de Chile: 23 de diciembre de 1598- 9 de abril de 1605: memoria histórica, Impr. Nacional, Santiago de Chile, 1881.
- Atlas de Historia de Chile, Editorial Universitaria, ISBN 956-11-1776-2 pg. 48
- Guarda OSB, Gabriel (1978). Historia urbana del reino de Chile (in Spanish). Editorial Andrés Bello.
- Salazar, Gabriel; Pinto, Julio (2002). Historia contemporánea de Chile III. La economía: mercados empresarios y trabajadores. LOM Ediciones. ISBN 956-282-172-2.
- Villalobos, Sergio; Silva, Osvaldo; Silva, Fernando; Estelle, Patricio (1974). Historia De Chile (14th ed.). Editorial Universitaria. ISBN 956-11-1163-2.
- Lorenzo, Santiago (1986) [1983]. Origen de las ciudades chilenas: Las fundaciones del siglo XVIII (in Spanish) (2nd ed.). Santiago de Chile. p. 158.

- Otero, Luis (2006). La huella del fuego: Historia de los bosques nativos. Poblamiento y cambios en el paisaje del sur de Chile. Pehuén Editores. ISBN 956-16-0409-4.
