= Salazar brothers =

When I first came to this city [Lima], without knowing who was don Antonio de Acuña nor his brothers in law, I immediately heard the news of the great uprising of the Chilean Indians...

—Viceroy of Peru Luis Enríquez de Guzmán

The Salazar brothers, or more accurately siblings since they included one sister, were Spanish criollos who played important roles in mid-17th century affairs in the Captaincy General of Chile. They became infamous for their slave hunting expeditions, corruption and role in unleashing the Mapuche uprising of 1655.

- Juan de Salazar was a maestre de campo known for organizing the 1654 slave hunting expedition that ended in his defeat in the Battle of Río Bueno. He organized a new expedition next year and was with about 2,000–2,400 men near Mariquina when the 1655 uprising begun. He killed 6,000 of his own army's horses as to avoid them being captured by Mapuches and then advanced quickly to Valdivia where he embarked with 360 soldiers to Concepción.
- José de Salazar (d. 1655) was a military officer who commanded the Spanish garrison at Nacimiento when the uprising of 1655 begun. He died as he evacuated the garrison of Nacimiento down Bío Bío River in three vessels that ran aground near Santa Juana. As the overcrowded rafts ran aground thousands of Mapuche warriors that had followed them on both shores massacred all of the Spanish.
- A priest in Concepción. He went into hiding from popular discontent that arose in Concepción as a consequence of the uprising.
- Juana de Salazar was the wife of governor Antonio de Acuña Cabrera. She is said to have manipulated the governor to advance the interest of her family. She interfered with the governor's investigation on her brothers behaviour during the campaign that led to the defeat at the Battle of Río Bueno. She selected witnesses that declared favourable opinions of Juan de Salazar. The results of the investigation not only justified Juan de Salazar's conduct but called for him to be granted the command of an even larger army to chastise the Cuncos and allow him to recover his honour.

== Bibliography ==
- Barros Arana, Diego. Historia general de Chile (in Spanish). Vol. Tomo cuarto (Digital edition based on the second edition of 2000 ed.). Alicante: Biblioteca Virtual Miguel de Cervantes.
- Pinochet Ugarte, Augusto; Villaroel Carmona, Rafael; Lepe Orellana, Jaime; Fuente-Alba Poblete, J. Miguel; Fuenzalida Helms, Eduardo (1997). Historia militar de Chile (in Spanish) (3rd ed.). Biblioteca Militar.
