= Army of Arauco =

Army of Arauco Ejército de Arauco
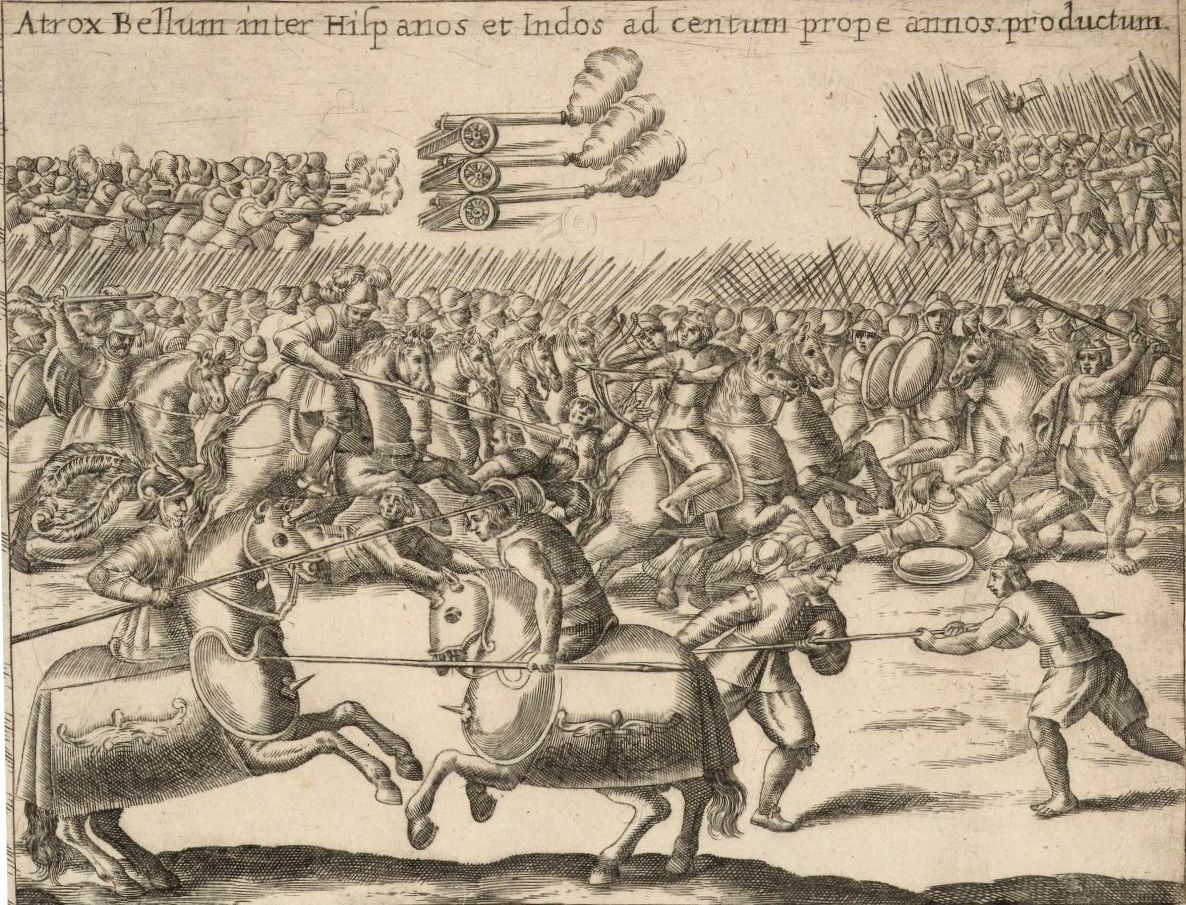
- The Army of Arauco battling Mapuches as depicted in Alonso de Ovalle's Histórica relación del Reyno de Chile (1646).
- Active: 1604–1810 (dissolution)
- Country: Spanish Monarchy
- Allegiance: King of Spain
- Branch: Spanish Army
- Type: Tercio
- Role: Security, control, and defense of the Captaincy General of Chile
- Size: 1,500
- Garrison/HQ: Concepción
- Engagements: Battle of Río Bueno

Commanders
- Notable commanders: Alonso de Ribera; Francisco Laso de la Vega; Pedro Porter Casanate

Flag of the Spanish Tercios.

The Army of Arauco (Spanish: Ejército de Arauco) was a professional army in the service of the kings of Spain that was based in Spanish-Mapuche frontier, south-central Chile, during the 16th to 19th centuries. It was notable for being a rare example of a standing army in the Americas. The army was established after the disastrous Destruction of the Seven Cities (1598–1604) to fight in the Arauco War against anti-Spanish Mapuche coalitions. The army was financed by silver from Potosí, in a payment called Real Situado. With the army headquarters being in Concepción this city became the "military capital" of Chile.

The Army of Arauco shaped the economy of southern Chile as it created a demand for wine and it meant an inflow of silver. This stimulated the Chilean wine industry as well as the Mapuche silverwork tradition. In addition Guaraní indians serving the army are thought to have helped establish the custom of drinking yerba mate in southern Chile.

== See also ==
- Soldado de cuera
