= Diego de Rosales =

Spanish chronicler and author

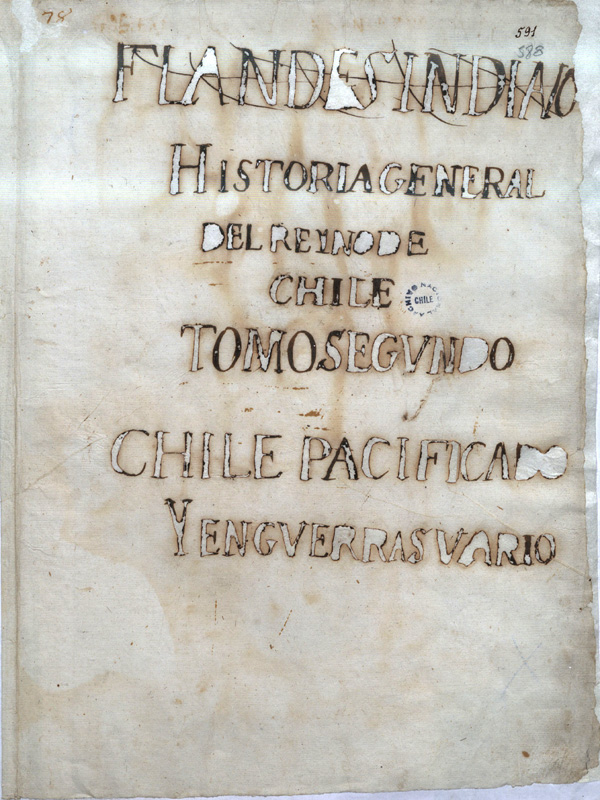
- Historia General del Reino de Chile
- Born: 1601; Madrid, Spain
- Died: 1677 (aged 75–76); Santiago, Chile
- Occupations: Chronicler, author

Diego de Rosales (Madrid, 1601 - Santiago, 1677) was a Spanish chronicler and author of Historia General del Reino de Chile.

He studied in his hometown, where he also joined the Society of Jesus. He came to Chile in the year 1629, without having taken his last vows still being sent to the residence that the Jesuits had in Arauco. He served as an Army chaplain in the Arauco War during the government of Don Francisco Laso de la Vega and, in 1640, was ordained a priest in Santiago. During this time, he acquired his knowledge of the language and customs of the Mapuche.

He was close to the governors Francisco López de Zúñiga and Martín de Mujica y Buitrón, accompanying them and participating in the parliaments held in 1641 and 1647 during the Arauco War.

In 1650, Governor Antonio de Acuña Cabrera tasked him to conduct a journey to the Pehuenche tribes east of Villarica and later to Lake Nahuelhuapi. During the Mapuche uprising of 1655, he was in Boroa, long besieged by the Mapuche until January 1656, when it was abandoned. He was taken to Concepción and appointed rector of the Jesuit college in the city, where he stayed until 1662. He was then appointed superior of the Jesuit Province of Chile, having moved to Santiago. He held this office until 1666 and then assumed the rectorship of the Colegio Máximo of the order in the capital. He took up the direction of the Jesuits again between 1670 and 1672.

== Work as a chronicler ==
In 1674 he finished writing his Historia General del Reino de Chile. His first two books describe the geography, fauna, flora, and the life and customs of the natives. The second part deals with the history of the Kingdom from the arrival of Diego de Almagro until the General Rising of 1655. However it was not published until 1877 in Valparaíso, due to Benjamín Vicuña Mackenna, who acquired it in 1870 in London.

Diego de Rosales Historia documents a series of events such as the Dutch expedition to Valdivia.

Diego de Rosales is also known to have written a chronicle about the Society of Jesus in Chile, which was called Conquista Espiritual del reino de Chile. It was a series of biographies of the main missionaries of the order, combined with the descriptions of their personalities with tales of miracles, appearances and all sorts of wonders common in the minds and documents of the time. Unfortunately, this manuscript has only survived in part.

In his works Rosales used chiefly second hand sources such as those of Garcilaso de la Vega. Comparison to other written work have shown that Rosales writings are prone to errors and exaggerations.

=== Bibliography ===
- Rosales, Diego de (1877). Benjamín Vicuña Mackenna (ed.). Historia general de el Reyno de Chile: Flandes Indiano (1425–1553) (in Spanish). Vol. I. Valparaíso, Chile: Imprenta i Libreria del Mercurio.
- Rosales, Diego de (1878). Benjamín Vicuña Mackenna (ed.). Historia general de el Reyno de Chile: Flandes Indiano (1554–1625) (in Spanish). Vol. II. Valparaíso, Chile: Imprenta i Libreria del Mercurio.
- Rosales, Diego de (1878). Benjamín Vicuña Mackenna (ed.). Historia general de el Reyno de Chile: Flandes Indiano (1625–1655) (in Spanish). Vol. III. Valparaíso, Chile: Imprenta i Libreria del Mercurio.
