= Francisco Laso de la Vega =

Royal Governor of Chile

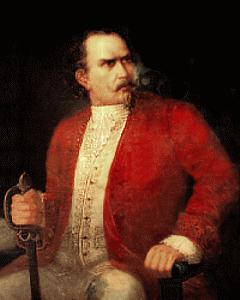
Francisco Laso de la Vega. Posthumous portrait from the 18th century.

Francisco Laso de la Vega y Alvarado (1568–1640) was a Spanish soldier who served as Royal Governor of Chile from December 1629 to May 1639. Victor fought in many battles against the Mapuche in the Arauco War.

He was born in Secadura, Cantabria, son of Garci Laso de la Vega and María de Alvarado. He was a descendant of the Cantabrian House of Lasso de la Vega. He served in the Royal Navy for five years from 1606. He went to Flanders for 16 years, where he was in many military actions in the Dutch Revolt and was promoted to captain of infantry. He participated and distinguished himself in the sieges of Bergan op Zoom, Bersel and Breda.

In 1623 he entered the Order of Santiago. In 1625 he returned to Spain, as a captain of cavalry, served as a judge in Badajoz, and was preparing to take the governorship of Jerez de la Frontera, when he was appointed Governor of Chile.

He served as governor between 1629 and 1639. His government was very successful against the warlike Mapuche in the Arauco War, defeating them in the Battle of La Albarrada. He also refounded the city of Angol, with families from the Fort of Santa Lucía de Yumbel, in 1637.

Ill in the last years of his term, he returned to Peru, suffering from edema, pausing in Santiago because of an attack. He remained six months there, and died soon after arriving at Lima, in 1640.

== Sources ==
- José Toribio Medina, Diccionario biográfico colonial de Chile, Impr. Elziviriana, Santiago, 1906, Pg. 450.

Government offices
Preceded by Luis Fernández de Córdoba y Arce	Royal Governor of Chile; 1629–1639	Succeeded by Francisco López de Zúñiga
