= Real Situado =

Revenues within the Spanish Empire for financing colonial defenses

The real situado (Spanish for: royal appropriated funds or royal allocated funds) was the Spanish term for revenues that the viceroyalties of Peru, New Spain, New Granada, and Rio de la Plata sent to finance colonial frontier defenses against internal and external enemies.

Soon after Pedro Menendez de Aviles founded St. Augustine, Florida in 1565, it became apparent to the Spanish crown that depredations by pirates and the resistance of the native population would prevent Spanish settlements from becoming self-sufficient in La Florida, despite their ranching and farming operations. As a consequence of this state of affairs, Philip II instituted annual transfers, known as the situado, from the Spanish treasury to pay the presidio payroll and other expenses.

This money was derived from the king's portion of precious metals mined in the Americas that was not transported to Spain, but rather was distributed throughout the colonial territories to fund their administrative and defense expenses. This system of financial transfers between the hundred or so treasury offices or royal cajas (cajas reales) spread across the Spanish Empire in the Americas and the Philippines. These intercolonial tax flows, or situados, formed a vital part of the Spanish monarchy's vast and complex fiscal system. There was a royal office in every important town. This system ensured a mutual interchange of compensation and financial support among the colonies. Remittances by the colonies that yielded the largest tax revenues defrayed the administration and defense costs of the poorer colonies. The silver mines of Mexico, especially in the second half of the 18th century, furnished an increasing sum spent directly in the Americas and not recorded by the royal treasury in Madrid.

The Viceroyalty of New Spain therefore not only provided important sums of precious metals for the Spanish metropole but also financed the largest part of the empire's defenses in the greater Caribbean. Private business developed to take advantage of the flow of capital raised by the situado and reaped growing profits for the upper colonial classes in military provisions, transport, currency exchange premiums, loans, and private trading.

The Real Situado from the Viceroyalty of Peru financed the Spanish Army of Arauco as a result of the Arauco War. Most of the silver came from Potosí in present-day Bolivia.

== See also ==
- Mapuche silverwork
- Wreckage of San José, ship carrying the Real Situado to Valdivia in 1651
