= Parliament of Boroa =

1651 meeting between Spanish and Mapuche delegates in colonial Chile

In the history of colonial Chile, the Parliament of Boroa (Spanish: Parlamento de Boroa) was a diplomatic meeting held on January 24, 1651, between various Mapuche groups and Spanish authorities held in the fields of Boroa. The parliament was attended by the Governor of Chile, Antonio Acuña Cabrera, who travelled to Boroa incognito from the fortress of Nacimiento in the north accompanied only by six men. This riskful crossing of Mapuche territory was considered a valiant but reckless stunt by Spanish subordinates.

The terms of the treaty were detrimental to the Mapuche; almost everything agreed then was in favour of the Spanish, including a prohibition for the Mapuche to wear weapons unless the Spanish asked them to do so. Mapuches were also to help the Spanish build forts and allow them free passage through their lands. In hindsight, the parliament is considered a failure given the massive Mapuche uprising that broke out four years later in 1655.
