= Carelmapu =

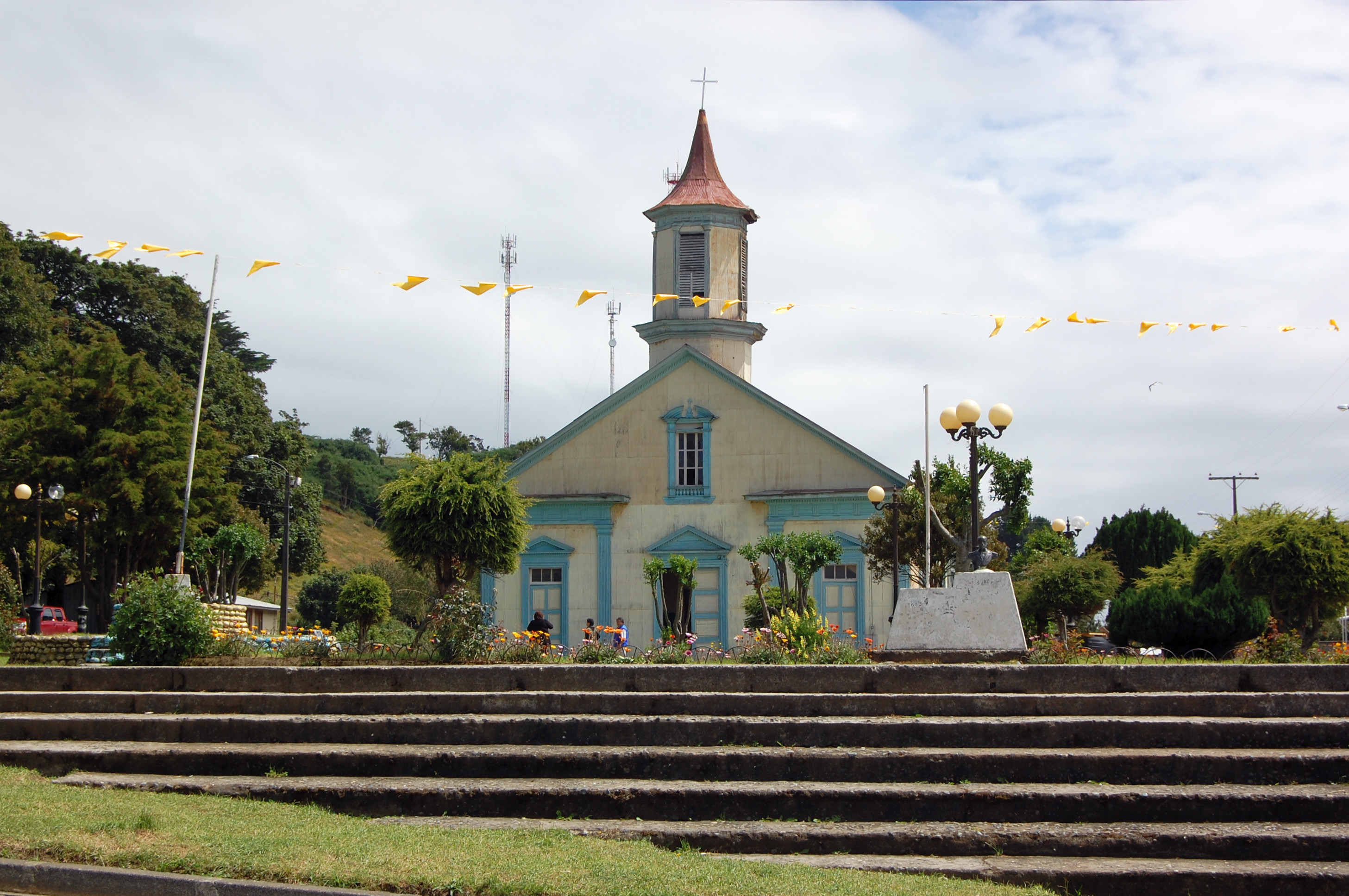
- Church of Carelmapu
- Interactive map of Carelmapu
- Coordinates: 41°44′45″S 73°42′23″W
- Region: Los Lagos
- Province: Llanquihue
- Municipality: Maullín
- Commune: Maullín

Government
  - Type: Municipal
  - Alcade: Jorge Westermeier Estrada
- Elevation: 5 m (16 ft)

Population (2002)
  - Total: 2,903
- Time zone: UTC−04:00 (Chilean Standard)
  - Summer (DST): UTC−03:00 (Chilean Daylight)
- Area code: Country + town = 56 + 65

Carelmapu (lit. from Mapudungun "Green Land") is a port and town at the western end of Chacao Channel, southern Chile. Carelmapu was established by the Spanish in 1602 as San Antonio Ribera de Carelmapu following the Destruction of Seven Cities. On May 14, 1633 a destructive tornado devastated most of Carelmapu.In 1643 Carelmapu was sacked and its church vandalized by the Dutch corsair Hendrick Brouwer. On March 6, 1676 Carelmapu received the exhausted survivors of Pascual de Iriarte's expedition to the Strait of Magellan.

== Fort system ==
During colonial times Carelmapu was the site of a small fort system made up of Fuerte de Carelmapu just west of Carelmapu, the sentinel outpost of Astillero and the battery of Coronel. The last two were not located in Carelmapu proper but further east along the northern shores of Chacao Channel. The original Fuerte de Carelmapu was built in wood in 1603. At present remnants of it can be found in a deteriorated state.
