= Mancera =

Mancera may refer to:

== People ==
- Miguel Mancera (b. 1932), Mexican economist
- Miguel Ángel Mancera (b. 1966), Mexican politician
- Pipo Mancera (1930–2011), Argentine television presenter
- Marquis of Mancera
  - Pedro de Toledo y Leiva, 1st Marquis of Mancera (1585–1654)
  - Antonio Sebastián de Toledo, 2nd Marquis of Mancera (1608–1715)
  - Pedro Sarmiento, 3rd Marquis of Mancera (1625–1715)

== Places ==
- Mancera de Arriba, Ávila, Spain
- Mancera de Abajo, Salamanca, Spain
- Mancera Island, Chile
