= History of Valdivia =

History of Valdivia

←	Discovery of Corral Bay

←	Founding of Valdivia

←	Major earthquake

←	Mapuches sack the city

←	Dutch occupation

←	City relocated to its current location

←	Major earthquake

←	Major earthquake

←	First German immigrants arrive

←	A waterspout hits Valdivia

←	Railroad reaches Valdivia

←	Major fire

←	First Valdivian Week

←	Calle-Calle Bridge opens

←	Austral University of Chile opens

←	Great Chilean Earthquake

←	Becomes part of Los Lagos Region

←	Río Cruces Bridge opens

←	Los Ríos Region is created

Valdivia is one of the few cities in southern Chile with a more less continuous and well documented history from its foundation in the 16th century onwards.

== Prehispanic times (12,000 B.P.–1543) ==
The site of Valdivia may have been populated since 12,000 – 11,800 B.P. according to archaeological discoveries in Monte Verde (less than 200 km south of Valdivia), which would place it about a thousand years before the Clovis culture in North America. This has challenged the models of migration to the New World and it is possible that the first inhabitants of Valdivia and Chile travelled to America by watercraft and not across a land-bridge in the Bering Strait.

By the time of the arrival of the Spanish conquistadores, Valdivia was inhabited by Huilliches (Mapudungun for People of the South). Huilliches and Mapuches were both referred by the Spaniards as Araucanos. Their main language was a variant of Mapudungun, the Mapuche language.

There was a large village called Ainil in present-day downtown Valdivia, and the Valdivia River was called Ainilebu. Ainil seemed to have been an important trade center due to its ease of access to the sea and the interior using the river network of the Cruces and Calle-Calle Rivers, both tributaries of the Valdivia. Ainil may be described as "a kind of little Venice" as it had large areas of wetlands and canals, most of them drained or filled nowadays. The market in Ainil received shellfish and fish from the coast, legumes from Punucapa, and other foods from San José de la Mariquina; an agricultural zone north east of Valdivia. Remains of this ancient trade is the modern Feria Fluvial (English: Riverside Market) on the banks of Valdivia River. The surroundings of Valdivia were described as large plains having a large population that cultivated potatoes, maize, quinoa and legumes among other crops. The population have been estimated by some historians as 30-40 thousand inhabitants as of 1548 based on descriptions made by the conquistadors. Pedro Mariño de Lobera, an early conquistador and historian wrote that there were half a million Indians living within ten leagues (one league is roughly 4.2 km) from the city. Other historians consider these numbers too high and argue that early Spaniards usually exaggerated in their descriptions. Later Charles Darwin would state that "there is not much cleared land near Valdivia" which suggests that pre-Hispanic agriculture in Valdivia was far more extensive than the agriculture practiced in the early 19th century.

== Spanish colony (1544–1810) ==
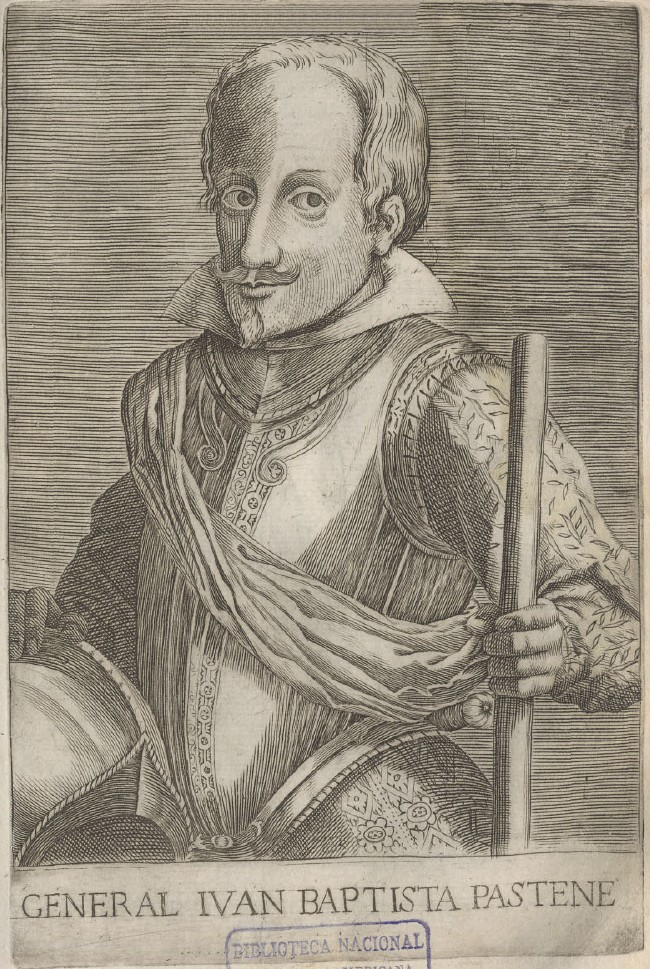
Idealized illustration of Pastene from Alonso de Ovalle's "Histórica relación del Reyno de Chile".

The first European to visit Valdivia River's estuary was the Genoese captain Juan Bautista Pastene, who took possession of it in 1544 in the name of the Spanish king, Carlos I. He named the river after the Governor of Chile Pedro de Valdivia.

Pedro de Valdivia later traveled by land to the river described by Pastene, and founded the city of Valdivia in 1552 as Santa María la Blanca de Valdivia. It was the southernmost Spanish settlement in the Americas at the time of the founding. Following the establishment of the church of Santa María la Blanca in Valdivia, more buildings were constructed, so many that it was considered "the second city in the Kingdom of Chile".

After Pedro de Valdivia's death, the war with the Mapuches, called the War of Arauco, continued as the Spanish made many attempts to defeat the Mapuche and defend the cities and forts built on their territory. On March 17 of 1575 the city was damaged by an earthquake similar to the Great Chilean earthquake of 1960. Until 1575 the Huilliches of Valdivia had not made any notable resistance against their new rulers. They had even fought as Indios amigos with the Spanish against the northern Mapucuhes in the Arauco War. But that year 4,000 Indians that had been fighting in Martín Ruiz de Gamboa's army rebelled when they returned to the surroundings of Valdivia.

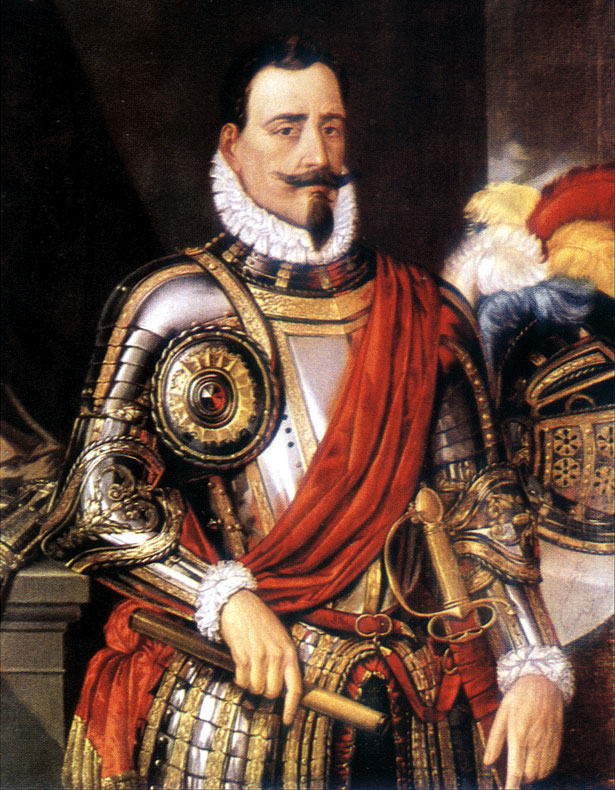
Picture of Pedro de Valdivia, conquistador of Chile and founder of Valdivia

After the demoralising Battle of Curalaba in 1598, in which an entire Spanish army was defeated and the Mapuches killed the governor, the Mapuches and Huilliches made a mass rebellion. The Indians proceeded to destroy all the Spanish settlements and forts in their lands, in what came to be known as the Destruction of the Seven Cities. On 24 November 1599 Huilliches destroyed and plundered Valdivia. The border of the Spanish Empire shifted north of the Bío-Bío River, while the later refounded city of Valdivia remained a Spanish enclave surrounded by native Huilliche territory, and along with the island of Chiloé, continued to be the southernmost colonies of the Empire.

Eleven days after the first destruction of Valdivia, a group of 270 Spanish soldiers arrived from Perú. The commander of the troops, colonel Francisco del Campo was convinced that the city of Valdivia needed to be repopulated. After Francisco del Campo's expedition left, the Dutch corsair Sebastian de Cordes occupied the site of Valdivia for some months, giving the Dutch government information about this abandoned part of the Spanish Empire. The Spaniards returned on 13 March 1602, when captain Francisco Hernández Ortiz established a fort on the ruins of the city. On September 24 natives attacked the fort unsuccessfully, but laid siege. The Spaniards could not acquire food or supplies, and on 3 February 1604 abandoned the fort, with the last starving survivors rescued by ship.

The Dutch governor of the East Indies Hendrik Brouwer, learned about the situation in Valdivia, and decided to establish a base there for further attacks against the Viceroy of Peru. This plan was well accepted as the Netherlands was at war with Spain. The Dutch had previously taken the North of Brazil from the Spanish-Portuguese crown, and the idea of creating a South American empire was attractive. In spite of his advanced age, Hendrik Brouwer left his post as governor in the East Indies to personally lead the expedition. The Dutch fleet destroyed the Fort of Carelmapu and the city of Castro before arriving at Corral Bay at the mouth of the Valdivia River. Hendrik Brouwer died the 7th of August in Puerto Inglés while waiting for spring to sail north to Valdivia. John Maurice of Nassau while in charge of the Dutch part of Brazil had equipped the expedition and had secretly appointed Elias Herckman as commander if Brouwer died. Herckman finally occupied the ruins of Valdivia in 1643. The Dutch did not find the gold mines they expected and the hostility of the natives forced them to leave on 28 October 1643.

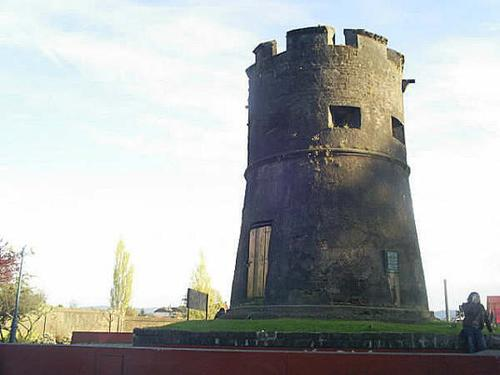
Image of Torreón El Canelo restored in the 1850s. It is one of two remaining Spanish towers in Valdivia used to defend the city and one of the few remaining colonial structures

Pedro Álvarez de Toledo y Leiva Viceroy of Peru (1639–1648) knew of the strategic importance of Valdivia and decided to repopulate and fortify it once for all. He financed partly the expedition to repopulate Valdivia with his own capital. The contingent in charge of the mission was organized in Peru and consisted of seventeen ships filled with building materials and supplies that astounded contemporaries by its magnitude. The local government of Chile could not secure Valdivia as it was engaged in continuous war with the Mapuches and was deeply dependent on the Real Situado, an annual payment of silver from Potosí to finance the army of Chile. The Valdivia enclave was placed directly under the control of the Viceroyalty of Peru that administered Valdivia from its repopulation in 1645 until 1740. Corral, located on the river entrance to Valdivia, became one of the most fortified bay at the time, with 17 forts. During this time it was several times proposed to move the city of Valdivia to Mancera Island. Valdivia's original site, downtown of modern Valdivia was repopulated in 1684.

From the 18th century onwards Valdivia was used as a base for colonization of southern Chile. This was partly fueled by rumours about a fabulous city called Trapananda, Lin Lin or City of the Caesars (Spanish: Ciudad de los Césares) that was situated in the unexplored lands of Patagonia. An expedition from Valdivia searching this city founded Río Bueno in 1777. In 1784 the Governors of Chile and Chiloé were ordered to establish a Camino Real from Valdivia to Chacao Channel in order to connect Ancud with Valdivia by a land road. This led to the celebration of the treaty of Río Bueno with local Huilliches in 1789. But by 1792 the Huilleches rebelled and planned to assault Valdivia. In 1793 the Parliament of Las Canoas was arranged. This treaty allowed the Spanish to build the road and repopulate Osorno in 1796. Osorno had previously been destroyed in 1602. With the Parliament of Las Canoas the local Huilliches became subjects of the Spanish Crown but were allowed to retain their lands and social structure. They were also meant to defend the land against Spain's enemies and the Spanish to defend them from hostile tribes. By the same time Huilliche lands around Valdivia were slowly overtaken by mestizos and nearby Indians became "reduced" (Spanish: reducidos) it means "pacified" by a combination of military force and conversion into Christianity. The territories north of Valdivia were not totally incorporated into the Chilean state until the 1880s when the Chilean army overwhelmed the indigenous resistance during the occupation of the Araucanía.

== Independence and growth (1811–1959) ==
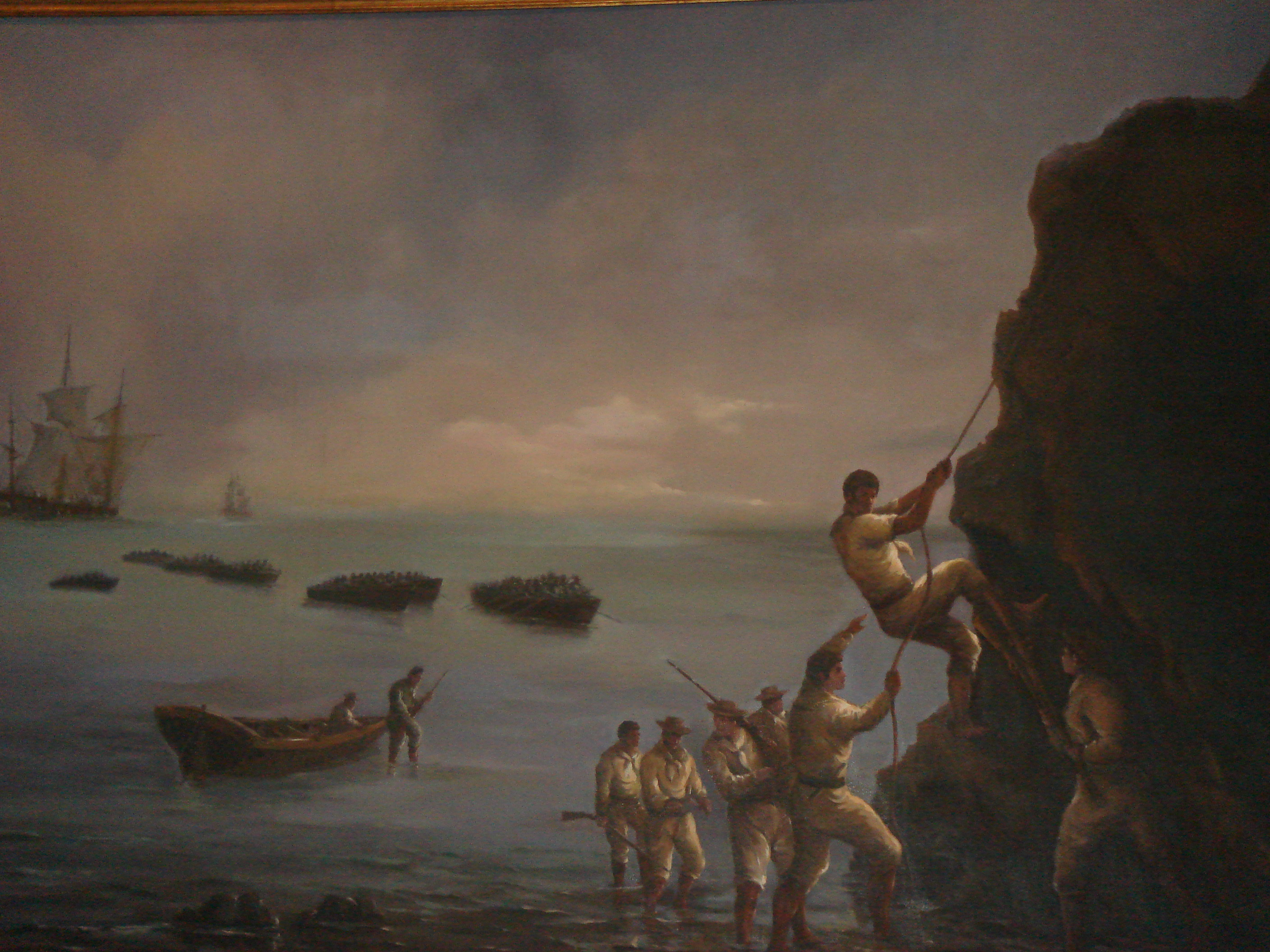
A painting of the assault on Corral fort

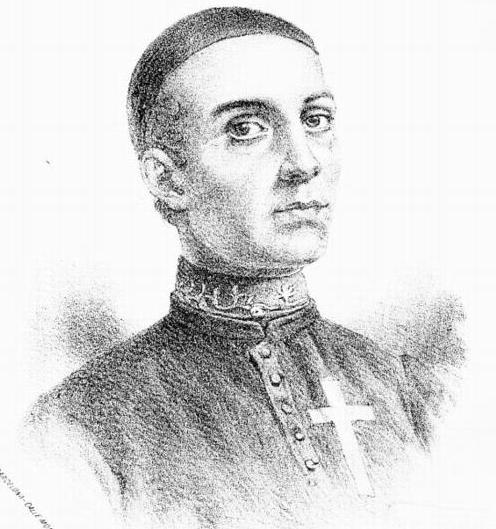
Friar Camilo Henríquez born in Valdivia was one of the founding fathers of the Republic of Chile

Self-governing juntas appeared in Spanish America and Spain after Napoleon occupied Spain and held the Spanish king Fernando VII captive. Many juntas, as was the case of Chile, declared plans to rule their territory in the absence of the legitimate king. At the time of the first governing junta of Chile in 1810 the Valdivian governor, an Irishman, Albert Alexander Eagar, led the celebration of what was seen as an affirmation of the legitimacy of the Spanish king. However, Valdivian independentists, such as Camilo Henríquez, saw an opportunity to gain absolute independence from Spain, organized a coup on 1 November 1811, and joined other Chilean cities that were already revolting against the old order. Four months after the coup, on 16 March 1812 a counterrevolutionary coup took control of the city and created a War Council. The War Council broke trade relations with the rest of Chile and confirmed Valdivia's loyalty to the Spanish government.

Even after several defeats of the Spanish troops during the Chilean Independence War, Valdivia and Chiloé remained loyal to the Spanish King. By 1820 the newly created Chilean Navy, commanded by Lord Cochrane, captured Valdivia, but failed to liberate Chiloé. Cochrane's land-based attack took the Spanish by surprise, avoiding a direct confrontation with the highly defended forts at the entrance to the Valdivia River. When loyal troops in Valdivia heard the news about the fall of Corral they sacked the city and fled south to reinforce Chiloé, passing by Osorno.

Chilean Supreme Director, and Libertador, Bernardo O'Higgins founded the city of La Unión south of Valdivia in 1821, to secure the way to Osorno, city that had been repopulated in 1796 by his father Ambrosio O'Higgins. Valdivia had been a province of the Captaincy General of Chile and was in 1826 incorporated as one of the eight provinces of Chile.

On February 20, 1835, Valdivia was affected by the worst earthquake in the area in several decades, event witnessed by Charles Darwin. He also stated that "there is not much cleared land near Valdivia" which contrasted with the description made by early Spaniards of large fields and extensive croplands.

The expansion and economic development of the city were limited in the early 19th century. To jump-start economic development, the Chilean government initiated a highly focused immigration program under Bernhard Eunom Philippi and later Vicente Pérez Rosales as government agents. Through this program, thousands of Germans settled in the area, incorporating then-modern technology and know-how to develop agriculture and industry. While immigrants that arrived to the Llanquihue area where often poor farmers, Valdivia received more educated immigrants, including political exiles and merchants. Some of the immigrants that arrived in Valdivia established workshops and built new industries. One of the most famous immigrants was Carlos Anwandter, an exile from Luckenwalde who arrived to Valdivia in 1850 and in 1858 founded Chile's first German school. Other Germans left the city and became settlers, drawn by the promise of free land. They were often given forested land, which they cleared to turn into farms. Native Mapuche and Huilliche either sold their land or were pushed into reservations. The Osorno department of Valdivia Province was moved to Llanquihue Province (created in 1853) as consequence of German immigration to the Llaquihue area.

We shall be honest and laborious Chileans as the best of them, we shall defend our adopted country joining in the ranks of our new countrymen, against any foreign oppression and with the decision and firmness of the man that defends his country, his family and his interests. Never will have the country that adopts us as its children, reason to repent of such illustrated, human and generous proceeding,...

- Carlos Anwandter

Valdivia prospered with industries, including shipyards, the Hoffmann gristmill, the Rudloff shoe factory, the Anwandter beer company and many more. The steel mills of Corral were the largest recorded private investment in Chile at the time, and were the first steel mills in South America. In 1891 Valdivia became a commune according to a law that created such subdivisions. After the Malleco Viaduct was built in 1890 the railroads advanced further south, reaching Valdivia in 1895. The first passenger train arrived in 1899. In 1909 a fire destroyed 18 city blocks in downtown Valdivia, which were rebuilt with modern concrete buildings. By 1911 lumber production, from clearing native forests, became the most important industry. Cattle-raising was a growing industry, and wheat was grown on the cleared lands. Lumber, cattle, leather, flour and beer were exported. In 1895 the city's population was of 8,062 inhabitants and was estimated in 9,704 as of 1902.

Valdivia, situated at some distance from the coast, on the Calle-calle river, is a German town. Everywhere you meet German faces, German signboards and placards alongside the Spanish. There is a large German school, a church and various Vereine, large shoe-factories, and, of course, breweries...

- Carl Skottsberg

The prosperity of Valdivia continued throughout the first half of the 20th century. In 1917 the first "Valdivian Week" (Spanish: Semana Valdiviana) was celebrated. Chile's oldest beauty content, "Queen of The Rivers" (Spanish: Reina de Los Ríos) began the same year. The city evolved as an early tourist center in Chile, while popular songs that named Valdivia and the Calle-Calle River made it better known in Chilean popular culture. The Pedro de Valdivia Bridge crossing the Valdivia River was built in 1954. Valdivia came to be one of the most important industrial centre in Chile together with the capital Santiago and the main port city, Valparaíso.

== Great Chilean earthquake and Valdivia in Los Lagos Region (1960–2006) ==
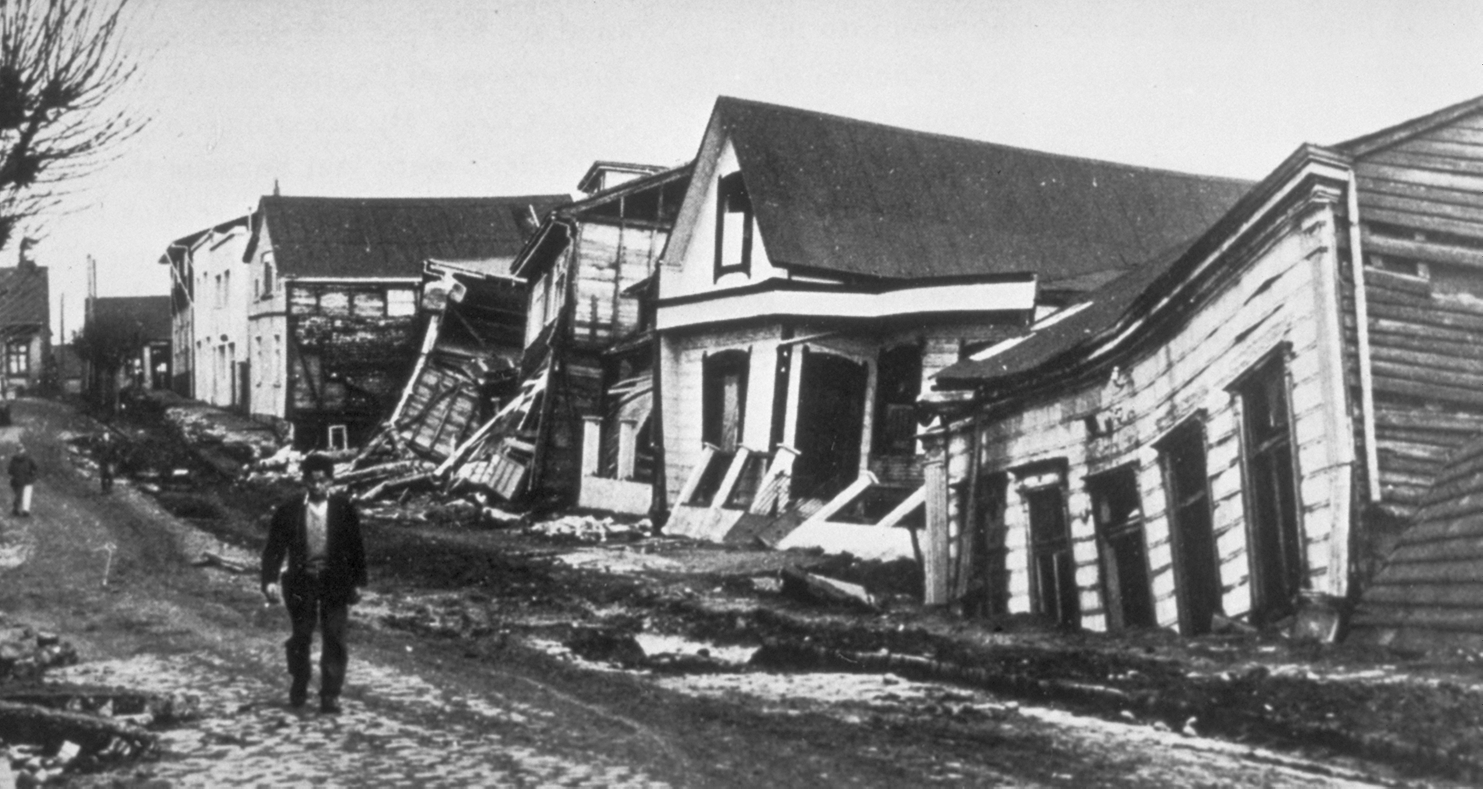
A street in Valdivia after the earthquake of 22 May 1960

On May 22, 1960, south-central Chile suffered the most powerful earthquake ever recorded, rating 9.5 on the Moment magnitude scale, with Valdivia being the most affected city. The earthquake generated devastating tsunamis that affected Japan and Hawaii. Spanish-colonial forts around Valdivia were severely damaged, while soil subsidence destroyed buildings, deepened local rivers, and created wetlands of the Río Cruces y Chorocomayo - a new aquatic park north of the city.

Large sections of the city flooded after the earthquake, and a landslide near the Tralcan Mount dammed the Riñihue Lake. Water levels in Lake Riñihue rose more than 20 meters, raising the danger of a catastrophic break and of destroying everything downriver. Government authorities drew plans for evacuating the city, but many people left on their own. Danger to the city was reduced after a large team of workers was able to open a drainage channel in the landslide, allowing water levels of the lake to slowly reduce to normal levels. There is evidence that a similar landslide and earthquake happened in 1575.

After the Great Chilean earthquake Valdivia's economy and political status declined. Much of the city was destroyed and many inhabitants left. By 1974, the military junta reorganized the political divisions of Chile and declared Valdivia a province of the Los Lagos Region with Puerto Montt as the regional capital. Many Valdivians resented the decision, and felt theirs should have been the legitimate regional capital—while Valdivia was founded in 1552, and had resisted pirate attacks, hostile natives and several earthquakes, Puerto Montt was a relatively new city founded only in 1853 (three hundred and one years later).

Since the liberalization of the economy in Chile in the 80s the forestry sector in Valdivia boomed, first by exporting wood chips to Japan from Corral and then by producing woodpulp in Mariquina (25 km northeast of Valdivia). This led to deforestation and substitution of native Valdivian temperate rainforests to plant pines and eucalyptus, but also created new jobs for people with limited education. Valdivia also benefitted from the development of salmon aquaculture in the 90s, but to a much lesser extent than places such as Puerto Montt and Chiloé.
