= Morro Gonzalo =

Steep hill marking limit of Corral Bay

- Headland
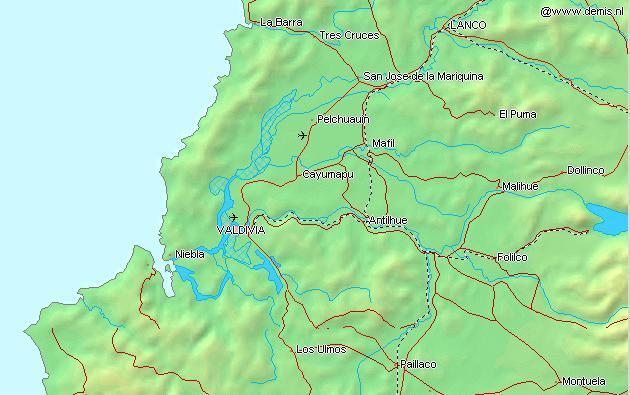
- Morro Gonzalo is seen in the map as the northward peninsula next to Corral Bay
- Coordinates: 39°51′14.08″S 73°27′53.80″W
- Location: Los Ríos Region, Chile
- Water bodies: Pacific Ocean; Corral Bay

Morro Gonzalo is a steep hill and northward headland marking the western limit of Corral Bay in Chile. During colonial times it hosted an observation post and a cannon of 4 pounds which was part of the Valdivian Fort System. There is a South American sea lion colony at the base of Morro Gonzalo. In 1996 there were 34 sea lions, of which about 15 where adult males, 10 were females and 10 were juveniles.
