= Pedro Sarmiento (disambiguation) =

Pedro Sarmiento (1956–2024) was a Colombian football player.

Pedro Sarmiento may also refer to:

- Pedro Sarmiento (cardinal) (c. 1478–1541)
- Pedro Sarmiento de Gamboa (1532–92), explorer
- Pedro Sarmiento, 3rd Marquis of Mancera (c. 1625–1715)
