= Antonio Sebastián Álvarez de Toledo, 2nd Marquess of Mancera =

Mexican politician (1622–1715)

The Most Excellent Antonio Sebastián Álvarez de Toledo 2nd Marquess of Mancera GE KOA
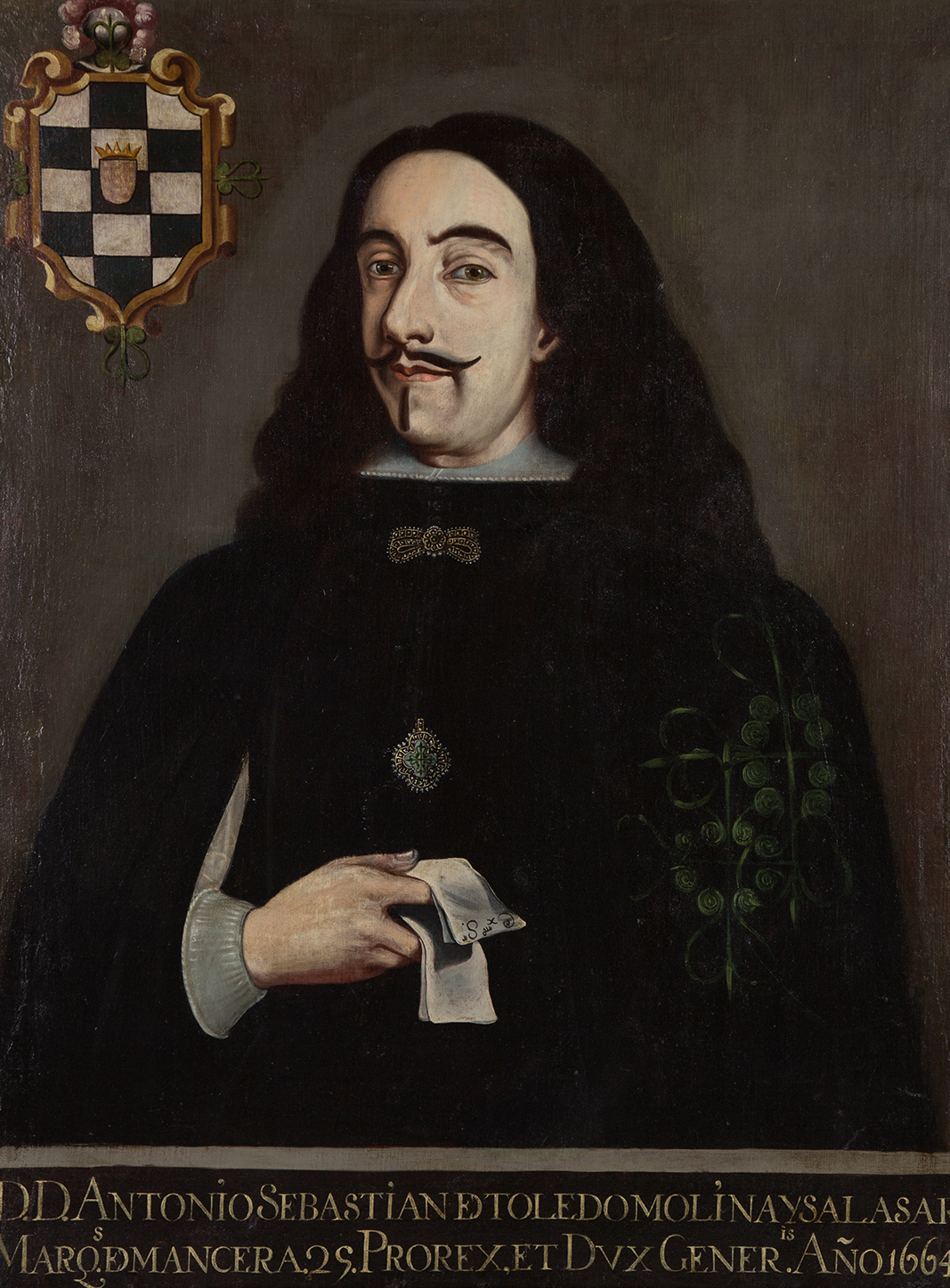

25th Viceroy of New Spain
- In office October 15, 1664 – December 8, 1673
- Monarchs: Philip IV; Charles II
- Regent: Mariana of Austria
- Valido: Juan Everardo Nithard; Fernando de Valenzuela
- Preceded by: Diego Osorio
- Succeeded by: The Duke of Veragua

President of the Council of Italy
- In office 1701–1715
- Monarch: Philip V
- Preceded by: Fadrique Álvarez de Toledo y Ponce de León
- Succeeded by: Office disestablished

Personal details
- Born: January 20, 1622 Seville, Spain
- Died: February 13, 1715 (aged 93) Madrid, Spain
- Spouse(s): Leonora María del Carretto; Juliana Teresa de Meneses
- Parents: Pedro Álvarez de Toledo, 1st Marquess of Mancera (father); María Luisa de Salazar (mother)

Antonio Sebastián Álvarez de Toledo y Salazar, 2nd Marquess of Mancera, Grandee of Spain (January 20, 1622 – February 13, 1715) was a Spanish nobleman and diplomat who served as Viceroy of New Spain from October 15, 1664, to December 8, 1673.

== Early life ==
Antonio Sebastián Álvarez de Toledo was born in Spain, but grew up in Peru, where his father, Pedro Álvarez de Toledo, 1st Marquess of Mancera, was viceroy from 1639 to 1648. In 1644, as a young adult, he was sent by his father in charge of a large navy to settle and fortify Corral Bay at the entrance of the ruins of Valdivia. The whole operation was a response to the Dutch expedition to Valdivia in 1643. Arriving at Corral Bay in February 1645 the men in charge of Antonio de Toledo commenced construction of a system of defensive fortifications. These would become the Valdivian Fort System, the most important defensive complex of the American South Pacific coast. It is an exceptional example of the Hispanic-American school of fortification. The building and maintenance of the fortifications became a heavy burden for the Spanish colonial finances but this was felt necessary in order to defend the southern approaches to Peru, the colony which, along with Mexico, constituted the main source of wealth for the Spanish Crown.

He returned to Spain with his father in 1648, and was subsequently majordomo of the royal palace, and then ambassador in Venice and Germany. On December 30, 1663, King Philip IV of Spain named him viceroy of New Spain, although the Council of the Indies had initially rejected him on grounds of his poor health.

== As Viceroy of New Spain ==
The Marquess arrived in Chapultepec and remained there some days before making his formal entry into Mexico City. While in Chapultepec he gave orders that no celebration was to accompany his arrival, because the treasury of the colony had been exhausted by remittances to Spain and the war against the English. However he also ordered that the 16,000 pesos intended for the celebration be used for a filigreed golden box to be sent as a present to the king. He entered Mexico City October 15, 1664, and took up his office.

The viceroy and his wife, the virreina, became patrons of the seventeenth-century nun and savant, Sor Juana Inés de la Cruz.

In 1668, the English pirate Robert Searle sacked and destroyed the plaza of St. Augustine, Spanish Florida. He stole (among other things) the payroll intended for the garrison there. To guard against a recurrence, Viceroy Álvarez de Toledo reorganized the Armada de Barlovento (coast guard). He ordered the construction of fast, heavily armed ships for the fleet. These expenses and other expenses of the administration nearly ruined the already depleted treasury. Nevertheless, the viceroy continued the reconstruction of the cathedral of Mexico City. Its ornate interior was finally finished in 1666, and the second dedication of the cathedral was held on December 22, 1667.

In other actions, the viceroy inspected the fortifications of San Juan de Ulúa, near Veracruz, and suspended work on the drainage system of Mexico City and the construction of a convent in Guanajuato for lack of money. He sent another unsuccessful expedition to Baja California. In 1670 Chichimecas invaded Durango, and the governor, Francisco González, abandoned its defense. He was able to save only his own property, and also left with the payroll of the soldiers.

In 1666 news of the death of King Philip IV reached Mexico City. A solemn memorial service was held in the as yet unfinished cathedral. Queen Mariana of Austria became regent for her son Charles II, who was 3 at the time of his father's death.

The Audiencia made trivial complaints against the viceroy to the Crown, such as that he arrived late at religious functions. Some of these complaints were forwarded to the viceroy. Toledo Molina y Salazar resigned the viceroyalty because of ill health, but the Crown did not accept his resignation. On the contrary, on April 3, 1670, it extended his term of office.

== Later life ==
He finally left office in 1673, but still remained for some months in Mexico City. On April 2, 1674, he started the trip back to Spain. On April 22, at Tepeaca (Puebla), on the road from Mexico City to Veracruz, his wife died and was interred there. He remained there for a time but eventually continued the trip alone and returned to Spain.

Once in Spain, he returned to the Court as the Mayordomo mayor of Queen Mariana of Austria, and acted as mediator between her and her son Charles II of Spain. In 1668, he was exiled in 1678 by order of his enemy Juan José de Austria. He supported the marriage of the King with Maria Anna of Neuburg and obtained the royal favour of Grandee of Spain in his personal capacity on 17 February 1687, and perpetual for the Marquisate of Mancera five years later.

Once the time of the succession to the throne of Spain arrived, he was first a supporter of the House of Austria, finally opting for Philip V of Spain, representative of the House of Bourbon, who in reward for his services named him president of the Council of Italy in 1701 and included him in the Government Board of the Kingdom in 1703.

He died old at the Court of Madrid in 1715, at the age of 93.
The Marquis himself had attributed the reason for his longevity to the properties of chocolate, a food that he, like his father, consumed in large quantities.

== Descendants ==
In 1655 the Marquess married Leonora María del Carretto, daughter of Francesco del Carretto, 2nd Marquess of Grana, with whom he had one daughter. In 1680 he married for a second time with Juliana Teresa de Meneses, widow of Francisco Ponce de León, 5th Duke of Arcos, but they had no descendants. The title passed to his nephew, Pedro Sarmiento, 3rd Marquis of Mancera.

By Leonora María del Carretto:

- María Luisa de Toledo y Carretto, 1st Marchioness of Melgar

== Ancestry ==
8. Enrique de Toledo; 3rd Lord of Mancera
4. Luis de Toledo; 4th Lord of Mancera
9. Isabel de Mendoza
2. Pedro Álvarez de Toledo; 1st Marquess of Mancera
10. Sancho Martínez de Leiva; Lord of the house of Leiva
5. Isabel de Leiva
11. Leonor de Mendoza
1. Antonio Sebastián Álvarez de Toledo
12.
6. Luis de Salazar; 1st Lord of El Mármol
13.
3. María Luisa de Salazar; 3rd Lady of El Mármol
14. Felipe Enríquez de Lacarra; 8th Lord of Ablitas
7. María Enríquez de Navarra
15. Mariana de Luna

== Additional information ==
=== Sources ===
- Barros Arana, Diego. "Capítulo XI". Historia general de Chile (in Spanish). Vol. Tomo cuarto (Digital edition based on the 2nd edition of 2000 ed.). Alicante: Biblioteca Virtual Miguel de Cervantes.
- Castro Pereira Mouzinho de Albuquerque e Cunha, Fernando de (1995). Instrumentário Genealógico - Linhagens Milenárias (in Portuguese). pp. 329–30.
- Hobbs, Nicolas (2007). "Grandes de España" (in Spanish). Archived from the original on 25 October 2008.
- Instituto de Salazar y Castro. Elenco de Grandezas y Titulos Nobiliarios Españoles (in Spanish). periodic publication.
- Lane, Kris E. (1998). Pillaging the Empire: Piracy in the Americas 1500–1750. Armonk, N.Y.: M.E. Sharpe. ISBN 978-0-76560-256-5.
- Toledo, Antonio Sebastián de. Enciclopedia de México (in Spanish). Vol. 13. Mexico City. 1988.
- García Purón, Manuel (1984). México y sus gobernantes (in Spanish). Vol. 1. Mexico City: Joaquín Porrua.
- Orozco Linares, Fernando (1985). Gobernantes de México (in Spanish). Mexico City: Panorama Editorial. ISBN 968-38-0260-5.
- Orozco Linares, Fernando (1988). Fechas Históricas de México (in Spanish). Mexico City: Panorama Editorial. ISBN 968-38-0046-7.

Government offices
Preceded by Diego Osorio	Viceroy of New Spain; 1664–1673	Succeeded by The Duke of Veragua
Spanish nobility
Preceded by Pedro Álvarez de Toledo	Marquess of Mancera; 1654–1710	Succeeded by Pedro Sarmiento
