= Gondomar =

Gondomar may refer to:

== Places ==
- Gondomar, Portugal, a city and municipality in Portugal
  - Gondomar (São Cosme), Valbom e Jovim, a civil parish in the city
- Gondomar, Pontevedra, a town in Galicia, Spain

== People ==
- Diego Sarmiento de Acuña, conde de Gondomar (1567–1626), Spanish diplomat
- Pedro Sarmiento, 3rd Marquis of Mancera (c. 1625–1715) and Count of Gondomar, Grandee of Spain

== Other uses ==
- Gondomar S.C., a football club based in Gondomar, Portugal
