= Marquis of Mancera =

Royal Title of Spain

The title Marquesses of Mancera (Spanish: Marqués de Mancera) is a hereditary title in the nobility of Castile and Grandees of Spain. The title was created by King Philip IV of Spain and given to Pedro de Toledo y Leiva, in the 17th century.

== Origin ==
The Toledo last name is a shortening of Álvarez de Toledo. In the 1570s, Pedro de Toledo, 8th son of García Álvarez de Toledo, 1st Duke of Alba, established a primogeniture (Spanish: Mayorazgo) over his estates and the surrounding lands, and became Lord of Mancera, Salmoral, Navarros, San Miguel, Montalbo and Gallegos, in the province of Avila, Castile-La Mancha, Spain.

Pedro de Toledo y Leiva, Lord of Mancera was granted the elevation of his title to Marquis on July 17, 1623.

Don Antonio Sebastián de Toledo, the second Marquis, was viceroy of New Spain from October 15, 1664, to December 8, 1673.

== Marquesses and Marchionesses of Mancera ==
1. Don Pedro de Toledo y Leiva, 1st Marquis of Mancera (1623-1654)
2. Don Antonio Sebastián de Toledo, 2nd Marquis of Mancera (1654-1715)
3. Don Pedro Sarmiento, 3rd Marquis of Mancera (1715-1721)
4. Doña Mariana Sarmiento de Vargas, 4th Marchioness of Mancera (1721-1748)
5. Doña Josefa Álvarez de Toledo, 5th Marchioness of Mancera (1748-1758)
6. Don Joaquín María Pimentel, 6th Marquis of Mancera (1758-1792)
7. Doña Maria Petronila Pimentel, 7th Marchioness of Mancera (1792-1802)
8. Don Manuel Antonio Fernández de Córdoba y Pimentel (1802-1805)
9. Don Joaquín Fernández de Córdoba (1848-1871)
10. Don Alfonso Fernández de Córdoba y Álvarez de las Asturias Bohorques (1871-1903)
11. Don Joaquín Fernando Fernández de Córdoba y Osma (1903-1957)
12. Don Gonzalo Fernández de Córdoba (1957-2013)
13. Doña Marina Fernández de Córdoba y Hohenlohe-Langenburg (2013- )

== Sources ==
- "Guía de títulos". Diputacion de la Grandeza y titulos del Reino.
