= Benedictine Monastery of the Holy Trinity (Las Condes) =

Monastery in Las Condes, Chile

- Monasterio Benedictino de la Santísima Trinidad de Las Condes
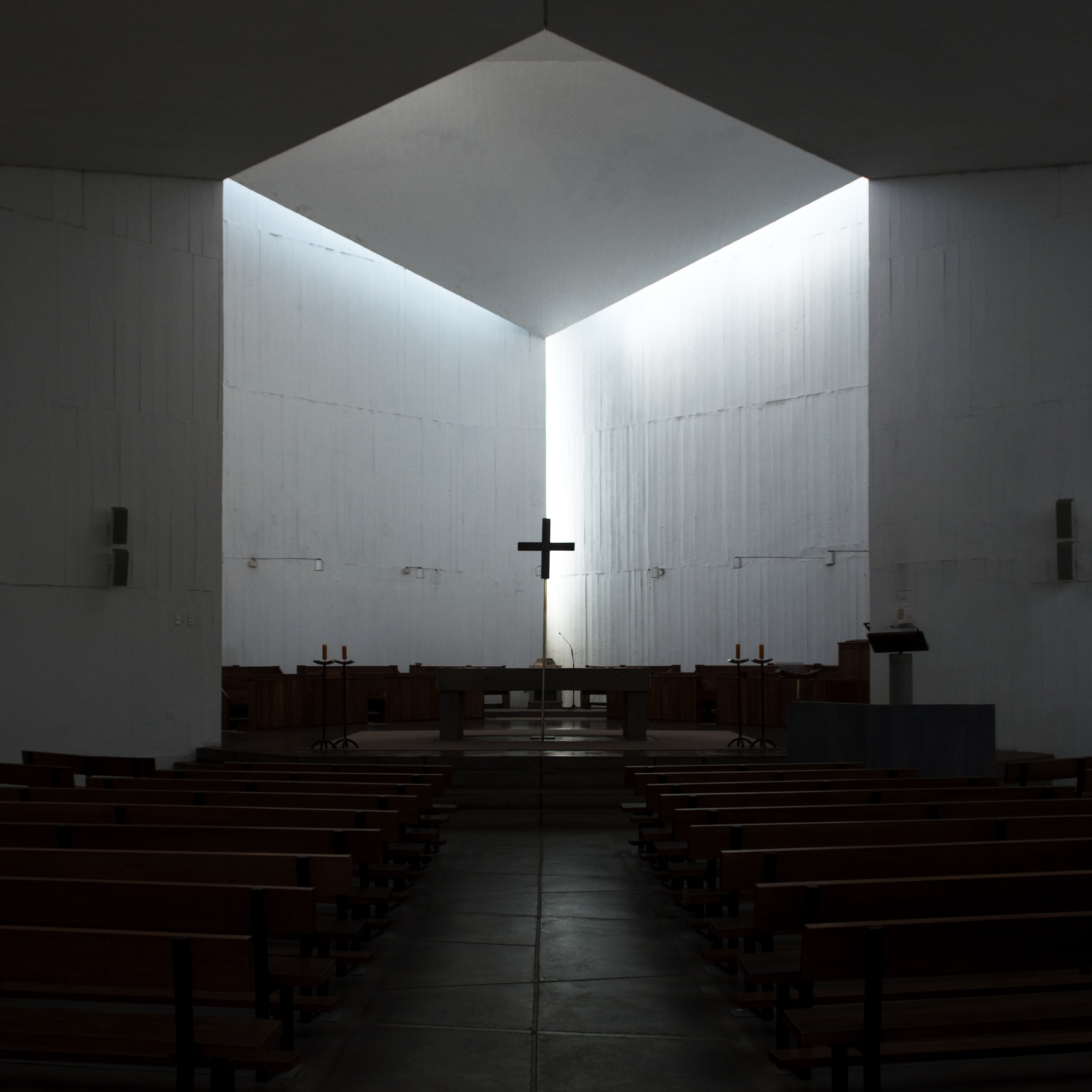

Location
- Location: Montecassino 960, Las Condes, Región Metropolitana, Chile
- Interactive map of Benedictine Monastery of the Holy Trinity
- Coordinates: 33.38431°S 70.51331°W

Architecture
- Architects: Martín Correa Prieto and Gabriel Guarda

Benedictine Monastery of the Holy Trinity (Spanish: Monasterio Benedictino de la Santísima Trinidad de Las Condes) is a Benedictine monastery in Las Condes, Santiago Province, Chile noted for its modernist architecture.

== Architecture ==
The monastery was designed by Martín Correa Prieto and Gabriel Guarda in 1961 and constructed from 1962 to 1964. In designing the building, Prieto and Guarda focused on the manipulation of light.

The building was designated a National Monument of Chile in 1981.

== Gallery ==
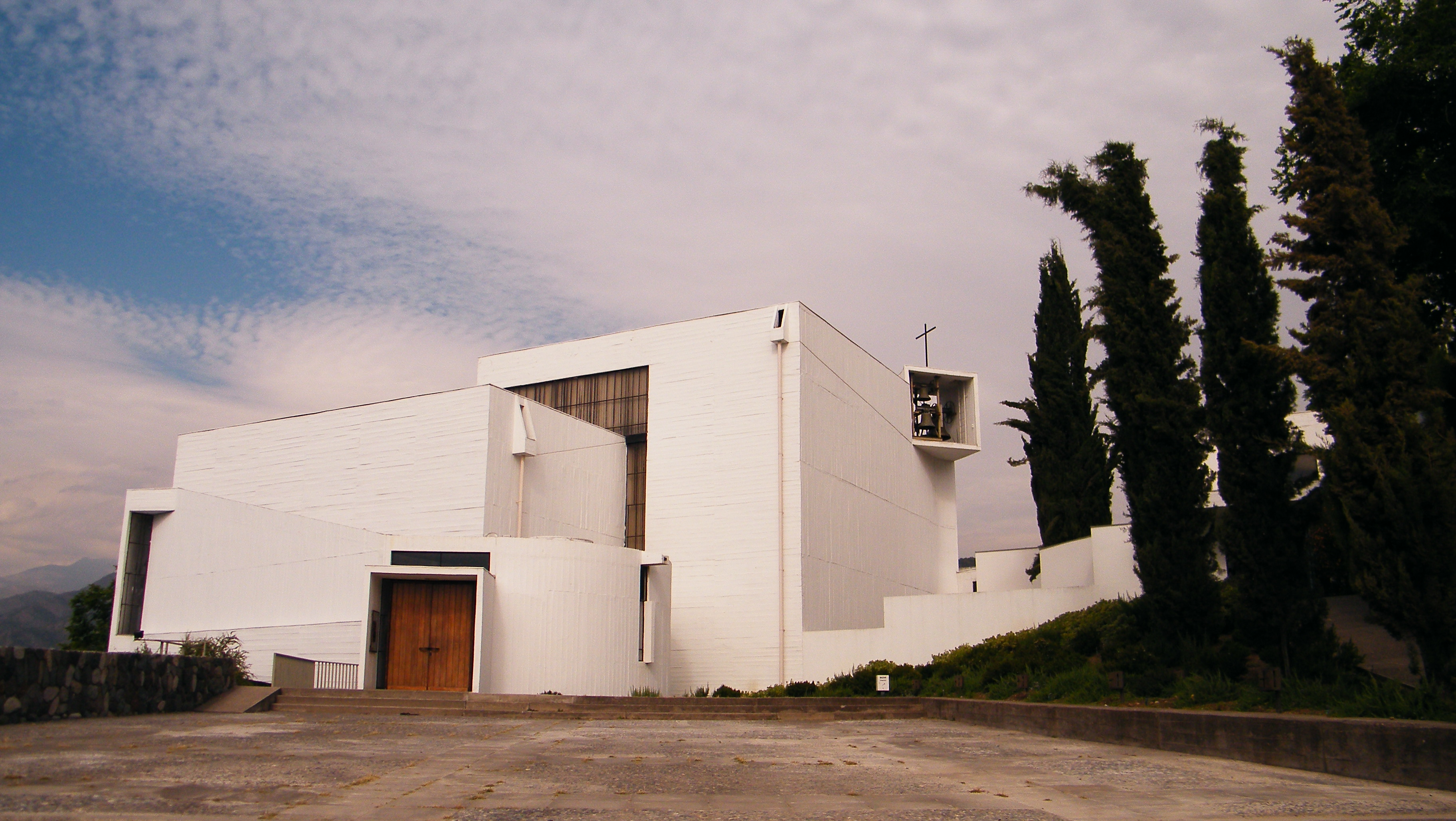
Building façade

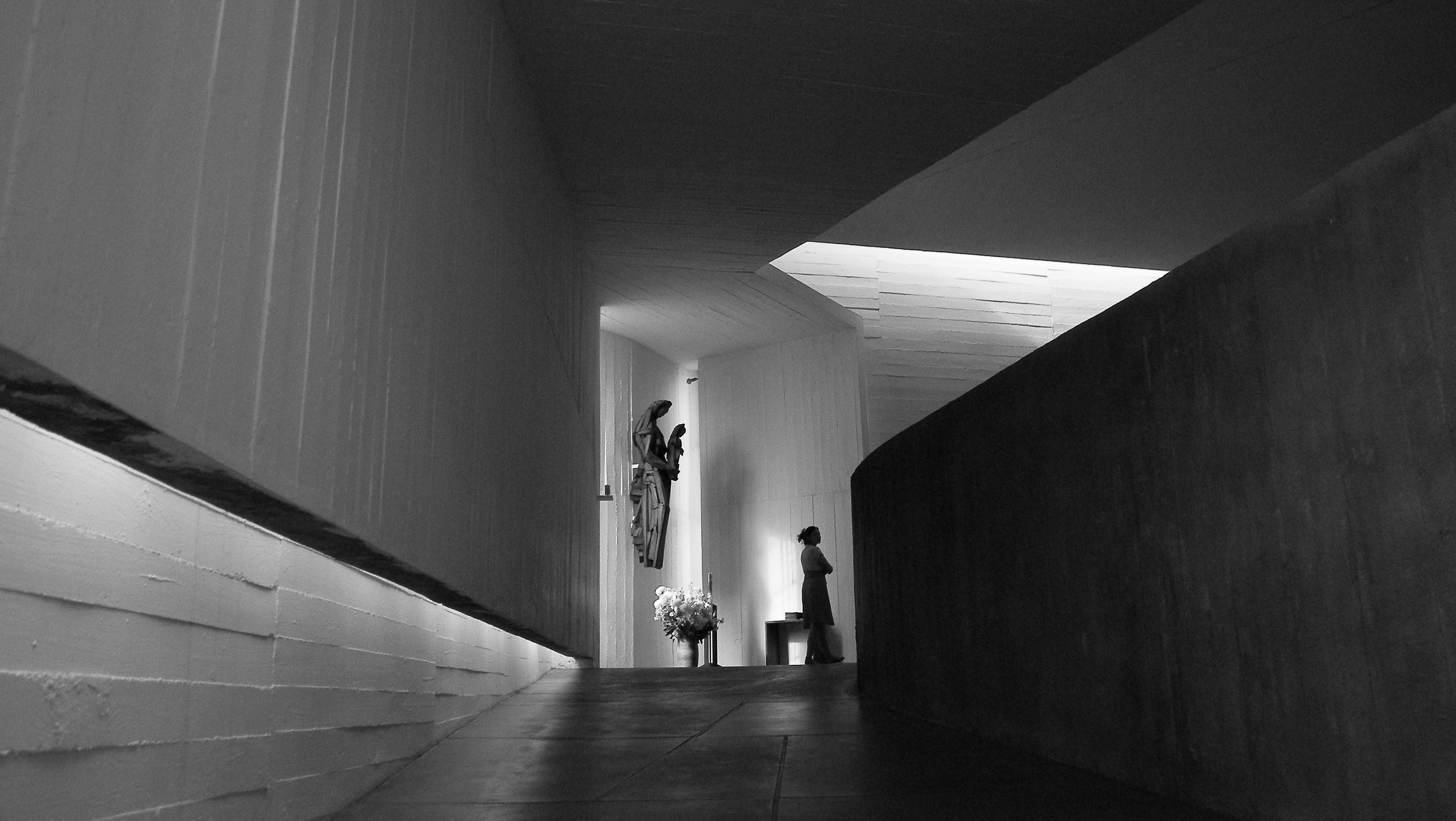
Chapel interior

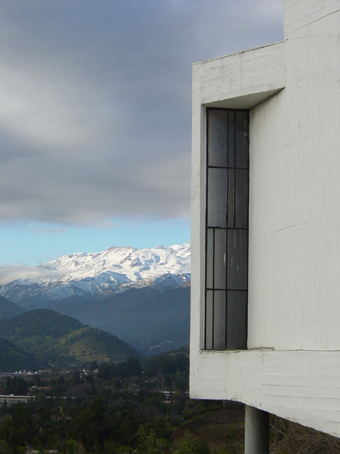
View of Andes from monastery

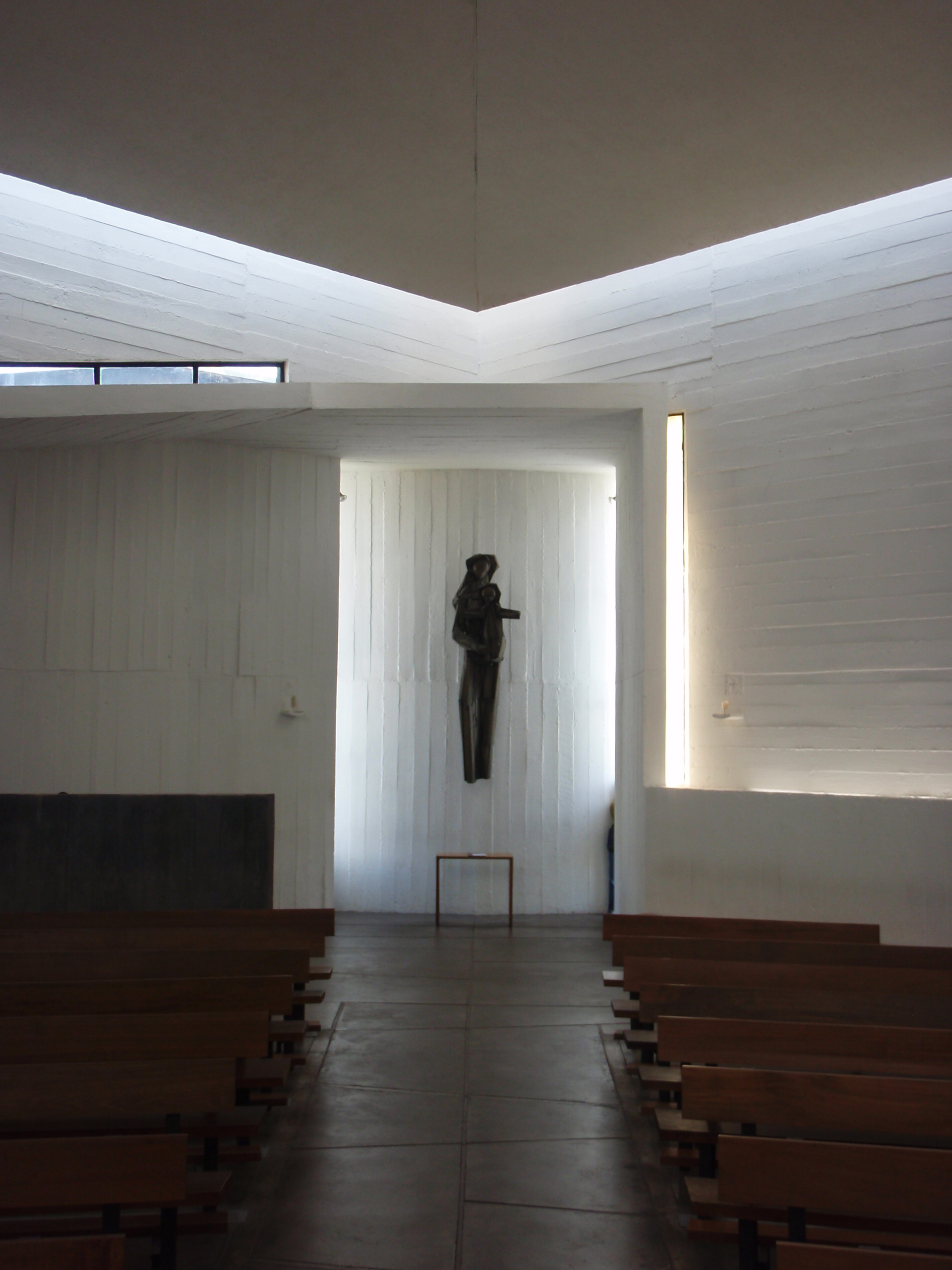
Seats in chapel interior
