= Santa Lucía Hill =

Hill in Santiago, Chile

Coordinates: 33.440°S 70.644°W

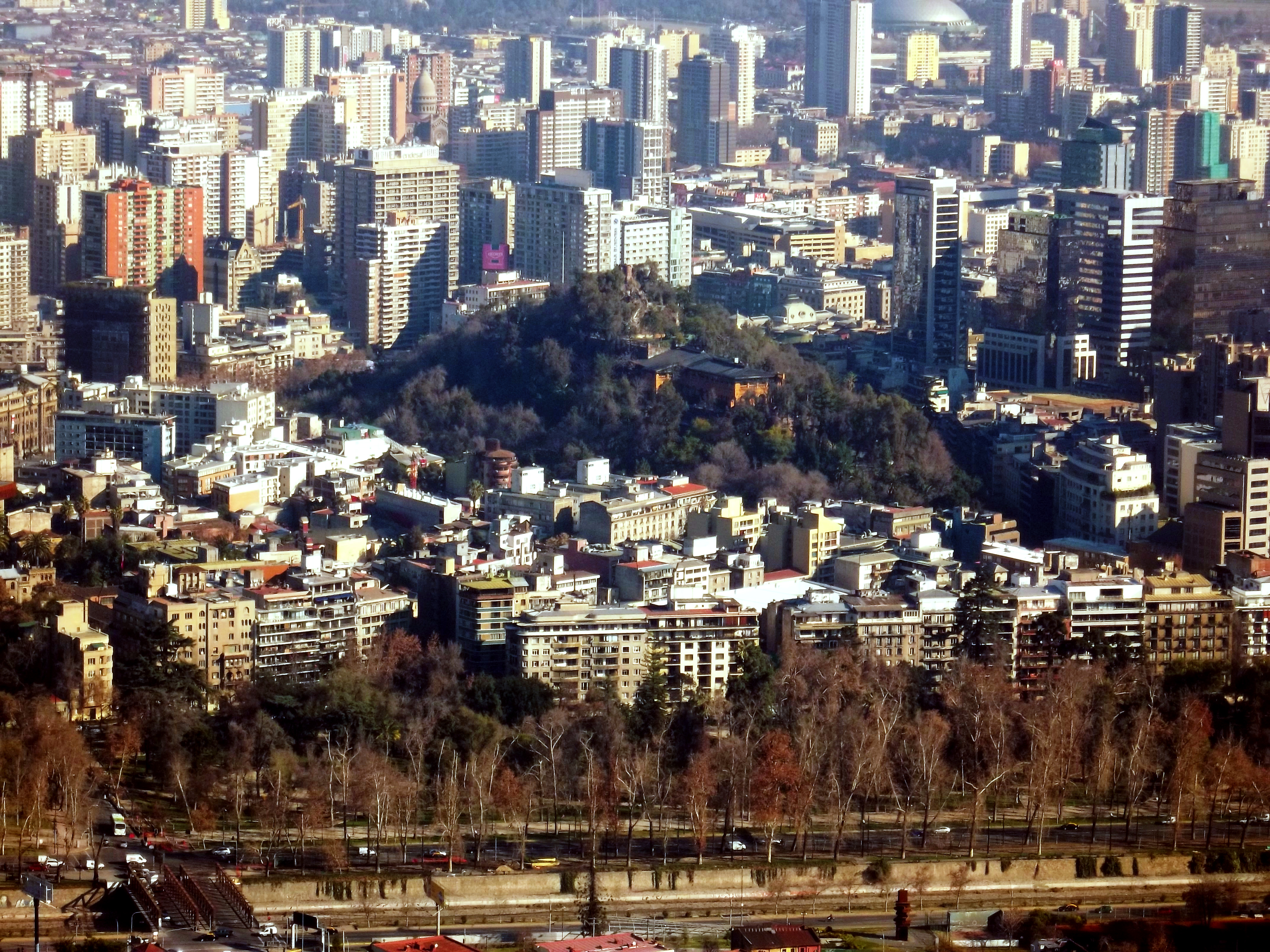
Santa Lucía Hill viewed from San Cristóbal Hill.

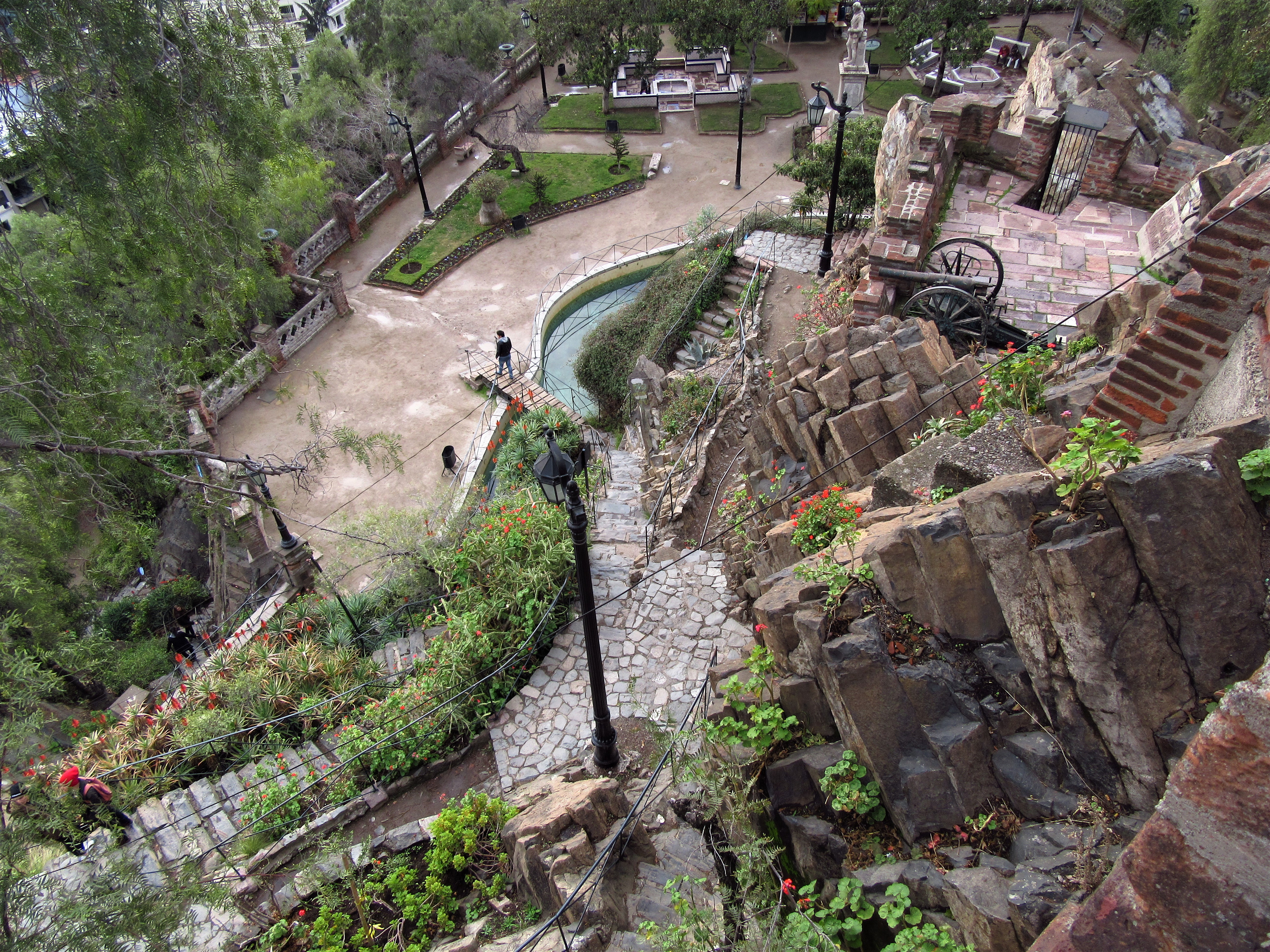
Santa Lucía Hill.

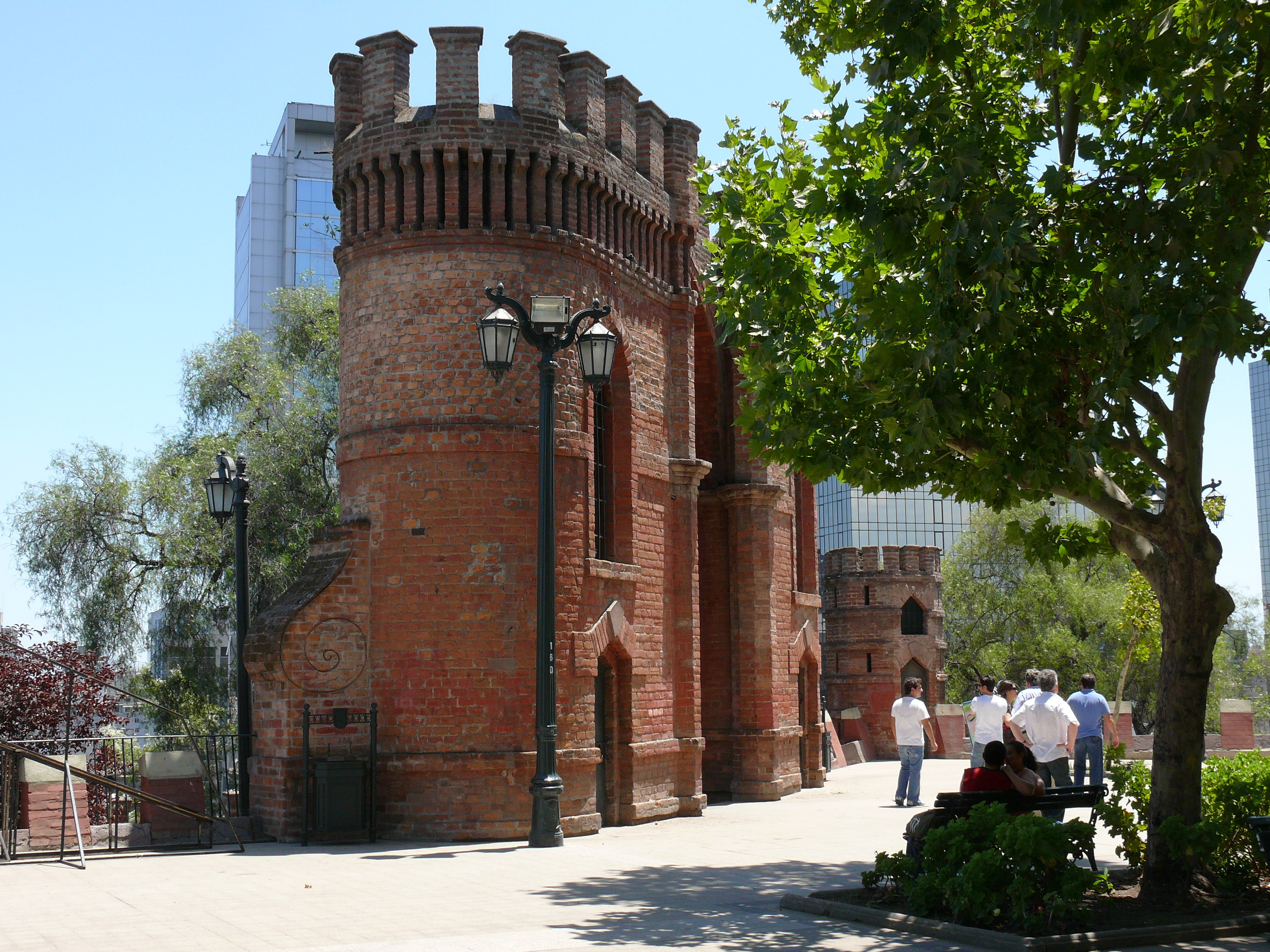
The Brigadier of the Royal Engineers Manuel Olaguer Feliú, proceeded to draw and build on the Santa Lucía Hill, two forts or castles, one north and another south of the hill.

Santa Lucía Hill (Spanish: Cerro Santa Lucía), also known in Mapuche as Huelén Hill (Spanish: Cerro Huelén), is a hill in the centre of Santiago, Chile. It is situated between Alameda del Libertador Bernardo O'Higgins in the south, Santa Lucía Street in the west and Victoria Subercaseaux on the east. An adjacent metro station is named after it. The hill has an altitude of 629 m and a height of 69 m over the surrounding area.

The hill comprises a 65,300 square metre park, adorned with ornate facades, stairways and fountains. There is a viewpoint at the summit.

== History ==
The hill was known as Huelén or Welén by the indigenous people of the area. The current name was given after Pedro de Valdivia conquered the hill on December 13, 1540, the saint day of Santa Lucía.

Its first use by its missionaries was as a point of worship, or prayer in the years of the chicken pox outbreak (1541).

In 1816, Manuel Olaguer Feliú, the brigadier of the Royal Engineers, designed and built two forts on Santa Lucía Hill, one north and the other south of the summit. The forts were built out of stone and lime and could fit eight or twelve cannons each. Olaguer Feliú also designed and built an outbuilding for ammunition depot and to house the garrison.

On one side of the hill, Fort Hidalgo was finished in 1820 as a defensive point. On the other side, the hillside terrain was used as a "cemetery for the dissidents", people who did not follow the then-official Roman Catholic faith, or were considered otherwise unworthy of burial at hallowed grounds. However, the remains buried in the hillside under this custom were eventually transferred to a secluded section of the General Cemetery.

In 1849 James Melville Gilliss led an American naval astronomical expedition to Chile in order to more precisely measure the solar parallax. An observatory was set up on Santa Lucía Hill and operated by Gilliss. When the expedition ended in September 1852, the observatory and related equipment were sold to the Chilean government and formed the nucleus of the first National Astronomical Observatory.

In 1872 Benjamín Vicuña Mackenna spearheaded major changes to the urban atmosphere of Santiago, among which was an extensive remodelling of the hill. The works consisted of a road which led to a newly-constructed chapel at the summit, illuminated by the then-novel means of gas. The rest of the hill contains a park with fountains and lookouts. The yellow and white facade is also a product of Vicuña Mackenna's redevelopments.

Traditionally, a cannon shot is fired exactly at noon.
