= Juan Garland =

Irish military engineer

- Born: John Garland c. 1724; Ireland
- Died: December 1775 (aged 50–51); Caribbean Sea
- Other name: Juan Garland y White
- Known for: largest public works made in Colonial Chile

Juan Garland, born as John Garland, also referred to Juan Garland y White, (Ireland - † Schooner Marina, Caribbean Sea, December 1775) was an Irish military engineer who served the Spanish Empire, and who directed many of the largest public works made in Colonial Chile and served as Governor of Valdivia.

== Life ==
Private plan of Mansera Island, 1765 by Garland

John Garland was born in Ireland, possibly Dublin, around 1724. His parents were Richard and Isabel Garland (nee White). He emigrated to Spain where he joined the Irish infantry "Hibernia" in June 1738. In 1740, he was with the Edinburgh dragons, entering the Corps of Engineers in 1751, working on royal roads and fortifications in Pamplona. He fought during the Austrian War of Succession in 1746.

He was appointed a knight of the Order of Santiago in 1762. He was one of four founding members of the Royal Mathematical Society in Madrid in 1756. In Chile, he served as second engineer, travelling to there in 1763-1764 aboard La Venus with Ambrosio and Bernardo O'Higgins serving as his assistant draftsman. In 1728, he was appointed Governor of Valdivia, serving until March 1773.

He is credited with playing an important role in the creation of a culture of engineering and construction in Chile, as one of the first professional engineers to work in the country.

Garland received permission to return to Spain in 1772, but died aboard the Marina in the Caribbean Sea in December 1775 of typhus. In 1764, he had been granted permission to marry a local woman from Santiago, but he remained unmarried. Before he died, he named Ambrosio O'Higgins as his executor.

== Notable works ==
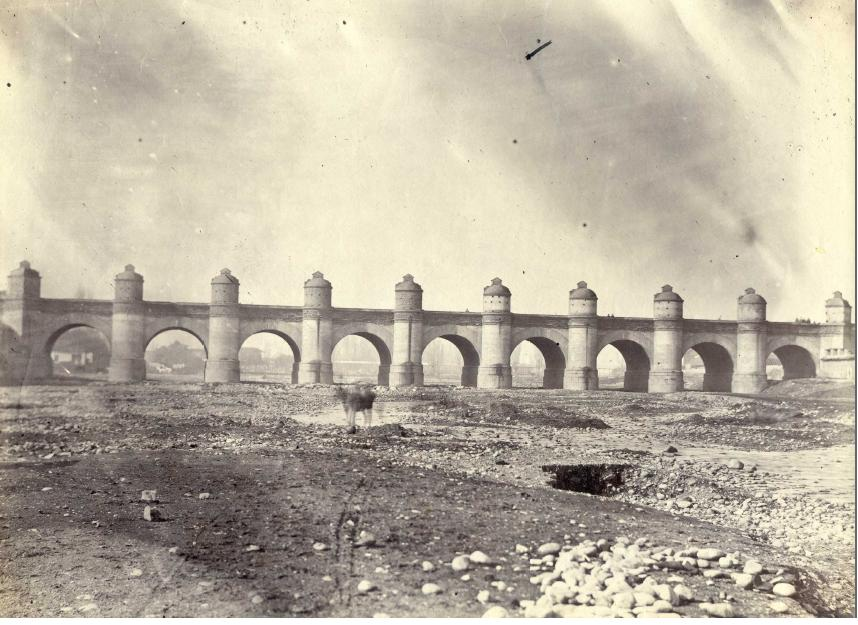
Puente de Calicanto in 1836

- Modification of the Valdivian Fort System
- Floor plan of the Cabildo of Santiago
- Selection of site and urban design of the new Concepción which was moved in 1765 following the tsunami of 1751
- Main church of Valdivia (destroyed later by the 1960 Valdivia earthquake)
- Makeover of dikes of Mapocho River (1765)
- Overseeing the improvement of the Santiago–Mendoza road
- Contributions on the design of Puente de Calicanto with José Birt and Leandro Badarán

== Legacy ==
- In Valdivia, La plaza Juan Garland, locally known as Plaza de los Jubilados, is named for Garland.
- In Niebla, there is a street named after Garland.
