= Gabriel Guarda =

Chilean historian and architect (1928–2020)

- Born: Fernando Guarda Geywitz; 19 January 1928; Valdivia, Chile
- Died: 23 October 2020 (aged 92); Santiago, Chile
- Awards: Chilean National History Award
- Scientific career
- Fields: History of Valdivia, history of architecture, colonial history of Chile

Gabriel Guarda (born Fernando Guarda Geywitz; 19 January 1928 – 23 October 2020), was a Chilean historian and architect.

== Biography ==
Guarda was born in Valdivia, Chile, in 1928. He studied architecture at the Pontifical Catholic University of Chile (Pontificia Universidad Católica de Chile), where he later taught in the faculties of Theology, Law, and Architecture. He joined the Benedictine order and spent most of his life at the Benedictine Monastery of the Holy Trinity (Las Condes), eventually serving as its abbot emeritus.

From 1962 to 1964, Guarda and fellow monk and architect Martín Correa designed and built the Chapel of the Benedictine Monastery. The building, which was declared a national monument in 1981, is considered a significant example of modern architecture in Chile and Latin America.

Guarda was part of the editorial committee of the journal Historia after it was established in 1961. As a historian, Guarda specialized in the colonial period, particularly the history of Valdivia, Chiloé, and other regions outside Santiago. He published more than 300 works.

His major publications include Historia urbana del Reino de Chile (1978), Cartografía de la colonización alemana 1846–1872 (1982), Iglesias de Chiloé (1984), Flandes indiano: Las fortificaciones del Reino de Chile 1541–1826 (1990), El arquitecto de La Moneda Joaquín Toesca (1997), and Los encomenderos de Chiloé (2003). His most ambitious historical work, La Edad Media de Chile (2011), focused on the religious and institutional history of Chile from the colonial period to the early 19th century.

Guarda was a long-standing member of the Chilean Academy of History and was widely regarded as one of the leading Chilean intellectuals of the 20th century. His research emphasized continuity in Chilean history and contributed significantly to the recognition and study of regional architectural and cultural heritage. In 1984, he received the Chilean National History Award.

He died on 23 October 2020 at the age of 92 at the Benedictine Monastery in Las Condes.
