= Manuel Olaguer Feliú =

Spanish military engineer

- Born: 27 December 1759; Ceuta, Spain
- Died: 7 June 1824 (aged 64); A Coruña, Spain
- Military career
- Allegiance: Spain
- Branch: Spanish Army
- Service years: 1770–1824
- Rank: Field Marshal
- Commands: Captain General of Galicia
- Conflicts: Huilliche uprising of 1792; Chilean War of Independence; Peruvian War of Independence
- Awards: Gran Cross of San Hermenegildo

Signature
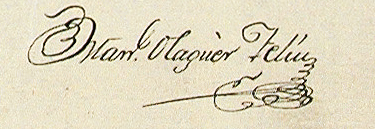

Manuel Olaguer Feliú (27 December 1759 – 7 June 1824) was a Spanish military engineer known for his role in constructing and overhauling fortifications in Colonial Chile as well as his later participation in the Chilean and Peruvian wars of independence. Upon his return to metropolitan Spain he was promoted to the rank of Field Marshal and became the Captain General of Galicia.

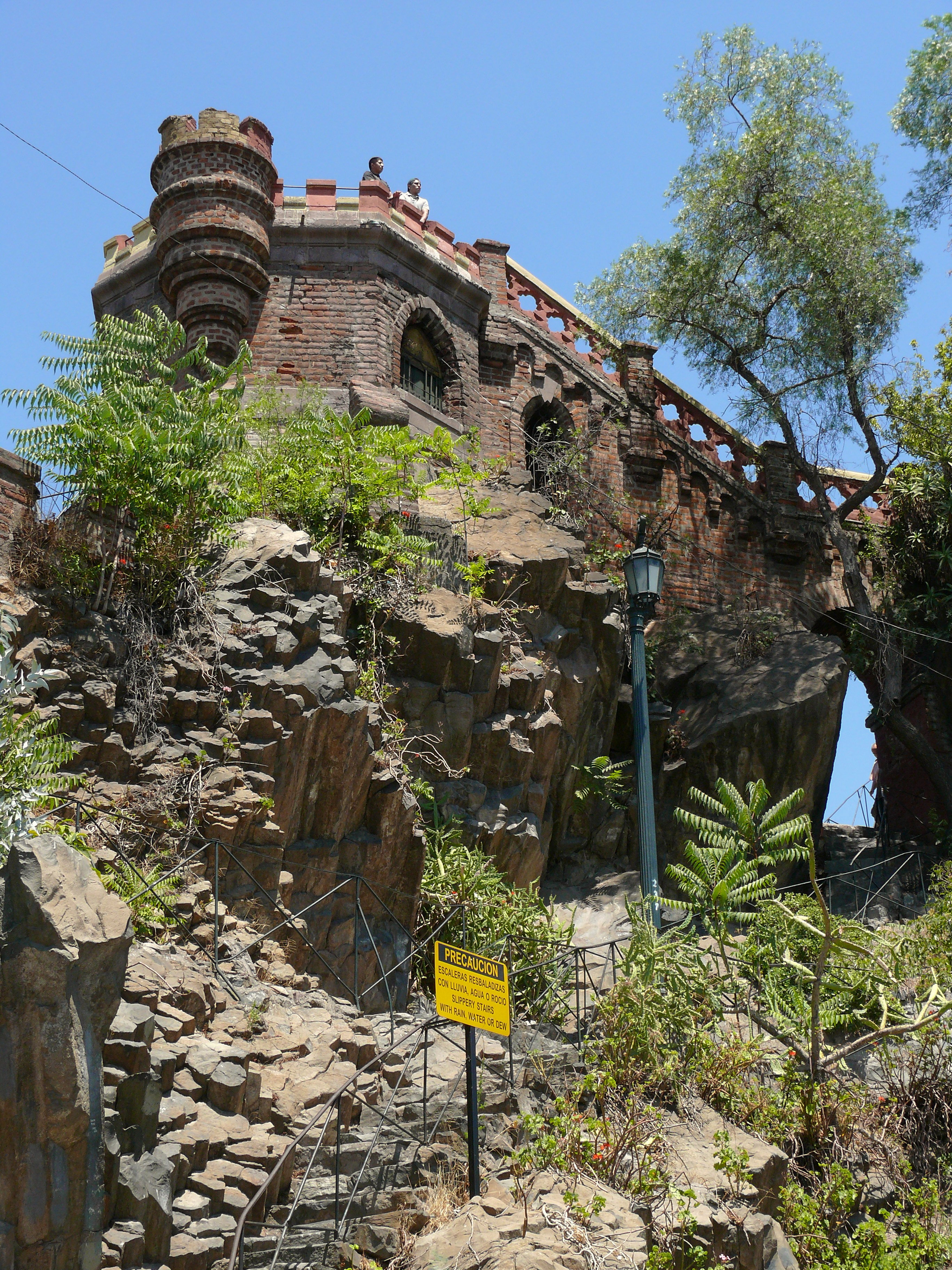
The Brigadier of the Royal Engineers Manuel Olaguer Feliú, proceeded to draw and build on the Santa Lucía Hill, two forts or castles, one north and another south of the hill.

== Biography ==
He was born on December 27, 1759, in Ceuta although descended from Catalans and was a first cousin of Antonio Olaguer Feliú, Viceroy of the Rio de la Plata and Secretary of War of the King of Spain, Carlos IV. Like their elders, they followed a military career, starting as a Cadet in the fixed battalion of Ceuta from 6/V/1770.

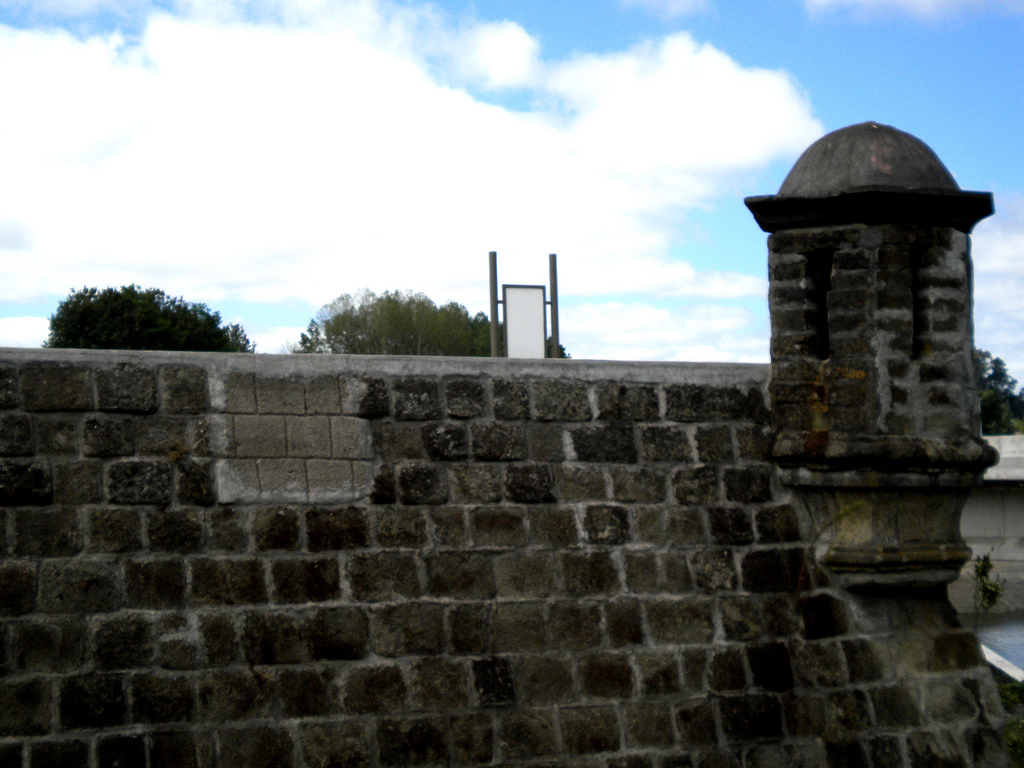
The Captain of the Royal Engineers Manuel Olaguer Feliú designed and built the Spanish Fort San Luis, in Osorno, a fortification that would later be known as Fort Queen Louise.

In 1778 he rose to Sub-lieutenant with posts in the Royal Engineers. Formed in Valencia, Madrid and Gibraltar. He acted in the war against England (1781).

In 1787, in the late colonial period in Chile, he was appointed by Royal Order to the city of Valdivia, with the rank of Captain of the Royal Engineers. Later moved by order of the Viceroy of Peru to Chiloé (Chile), with the mission to recognize defenses. He remained there two years, taking part in the construction of the new road between Valdivia and Chiloé (1789). He returned to Valdivia in November 1790.

Between 1792 and 1793 he took part in an armed conflict with the Huilliches in that area. He participated in the expedition that occupied the ruins of the ancient city of Osorno in August 1793. After being re-founded the city, he was appointed to be the first Superintendent of Osorno, Military Commander and Judge Ordinary by decree of Ambrosio O'Higgins, Baron of Ballenary and Marquis of Osorno (16/I/1796).

Simultaneously performed under his direction the construction of two fortifications based on stones, one on the banks of the Bueno River named the Fort San José de Alcudia, and the other in Osorno Rahue riverside property with the name San Luis fortification that would later be known as Fort Queen Louise (1794).

He went back to Valdivia as director of fortifications, where he did a new layout of the city, which lasted until 1909.

He was a member of the Extraordinary Council of Government (1807) of Valdivia.

In 1809, he assumed the command of the Royal Corps of Engineers, the Sub-inspection of militias of the Captaincy General of Chile. In 1810 he was appointed a member of the Observation and Monitoring Junta (Junta de Observación y Vigilancia in Spanish) by President García Carrasco. In this role Colonel Manuel Olaguer Feliu was surprised by the independence movement that happened in Chile. He took a position in favor of the King and participated in meetings in the house of the Count of La Conquista to develop a strategy against the revolutionaries. He was the candidate nominated for the presidency of Chile by the Monarchy party. Wrote a diary about those dark days, "Relation of what occurred in the Kingdom of Chile from 25 May 1810 until the erection of its Council of Government," and other works. He was banished to Chillán and finally allowed to go into exile in Lima (Peru).

The viceroy of Peru sent him on the Frigate Thomas, on an expedition in aid of the royal army of General Antonio Pareja, for the recovery of Chile, but he was captured with other leaders in Talcahuano (1813). He was released in 1814.

He held several public offices, including the Junta convened by Francisco Casimiro Marcó del Pont, the last Captain General of Chile.

He was promoted to the rank of Brigadier by the Viceroy of Peru, then confirmed by the King.

In 1816, the Brigadier Manuel Olaguer Feliú proceeded to draw and build on the Santa Lucía Hill, on the eastern edge of the city of Santiago de Chile, two forts or castles, one north and another south of the hill, built of stone and lime and able to put eight or twelve cannons each. Besides, he drew and built an outbuilding for an ammunition depot and to house the garrison.

On August 10, 1816, President Marcó del Pont commissioned him to find and organize a place in Campus Martius, to instruct the troops. He is considered one of the most distinguished military engineers in the history of Chile.

After the defeat of the royalist army in the Battle of Chacabuco by the Army of the Andes under General José de San Martín, he returned to Peru, being one of the commanders in chief of the fleet of 11 ships that brought back the remains of the Spanish army at El Callao.

Between 1818 and 1822, Field Marshal Manuel Olaguer Feliu, as Director of the Royal Engineers and Deputy Inspector of the Viceroyalty of Peru, joined the War Council (Junta de Guerra in Spanish) chaired by the Viceroy Pezuela. Later, he was appointed by the Viceroy of La Serna as Deputy of the council of Pacification of Peru, where they tried with General José de San Martín the conditions of surrender of El Callao.

In 1819, he was awarded the Grand Cross of San Hermenegildo by the King of Spain.

On his return to Spain, he was Director of the Royal Engineers and Deputy Inspector in Galicia. He died in 1824 in La Coruña, being Captain General of Galicia.
