= Valdivian Fort System =

Historic forts in Los Ríos Region, Chile

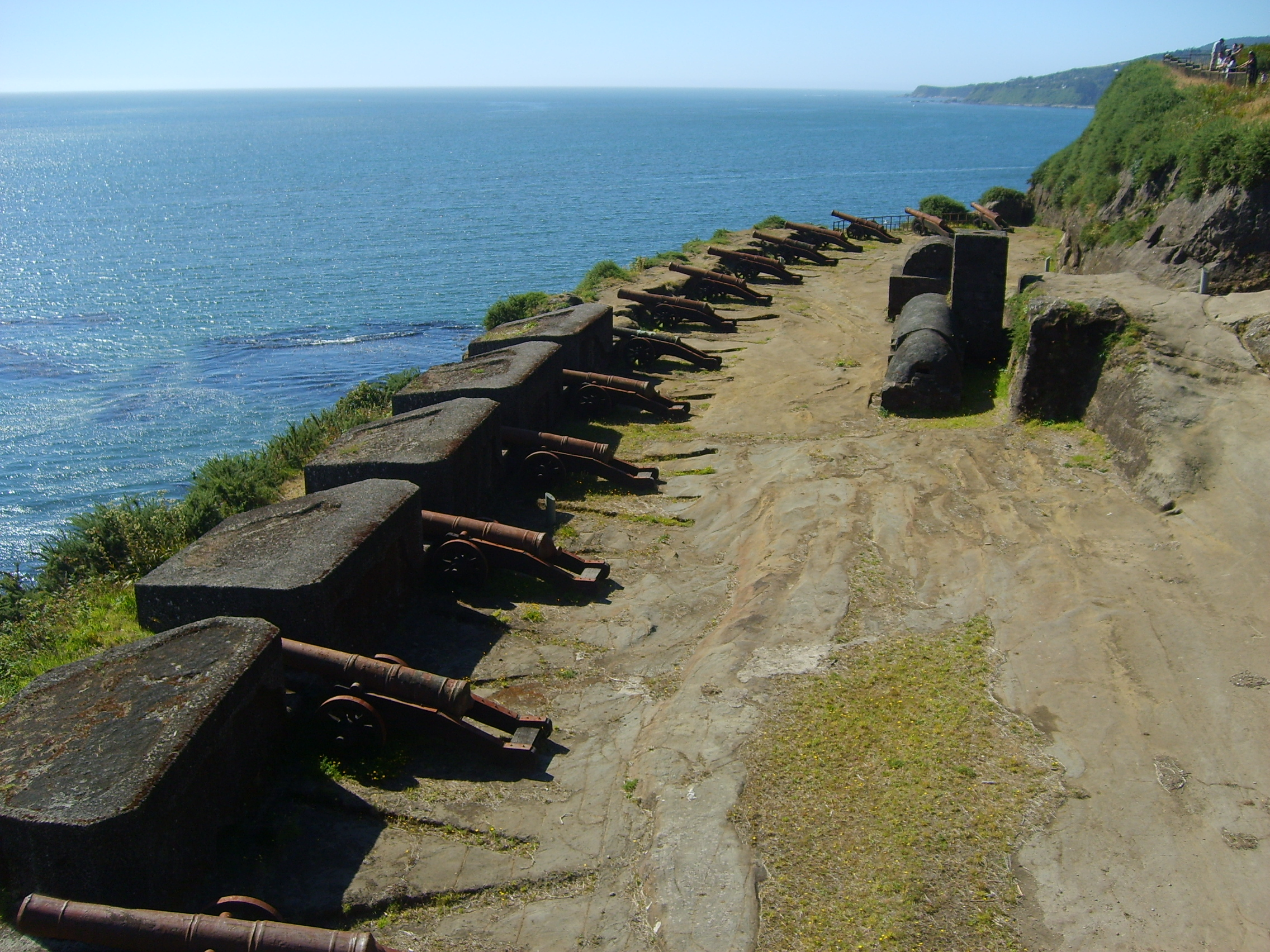
View of the batteries of Castillo de la Pura y Limpia Concepción de Monfort de Lemus in Niebla.

The Fort System of Valdivia (Spanish: Sistema de fuertes de Valdivia) is a series of Spanish colonial fortifications at Corral Bay, Valdivia and Cruces River established to protect the city of Valdivia, in southern Chile. During the period of Spanish rule (1645–1820), it was one of the biggest systems of fortification in the Americas. It was also a major supply source for Spanish ships that crossed the Strait of Magellan.

Building of the fort system began in 1645 and was overhauled after the Seven Years' War (1756–1763) by the military engineers Juan Garland and Manuel Olaguer Feliú. Having been a first-rate fort system in Spanish America, in the 18th century it was overshadowed by the forts of Cartagena de Indias, Havana, and Puerto Rico. The Valdivian Fort System was however still the main coastal fortification on Spanish America's Pacific coast.

During its existence the fort system has seen hostilities twice; first in 1670 when it dealt with a suspicious English expedition led by John Narborough and finally in 1820 when Chilean patriots led by Thomas Cochrane successfully captured it.

== History ==
=== Before the fortifications ===
==== Rise and fall of the first Spanish settlement ====
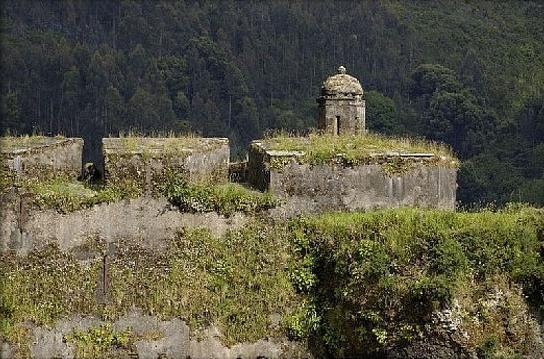
The main fort in Corral

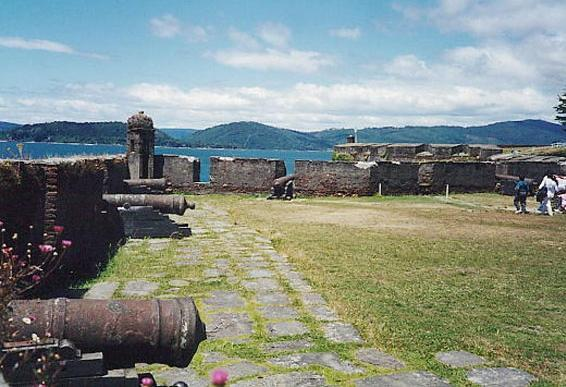
General view of the fort in Corral

The first European to visit Valdivia River's estuary was the Genoese captain Juan Bautista Pastene, who took possession of it in 1544 in the name of the Spanish king, Carlos I. He named the river after the Governor of Chile Pedro de Valdivia. Pedro de Valdivia later traveled by land to the river described by Pastene, and founded the city of Valdivia in 1552 as Santa María la Blanca de Valdivia.

On 23 December, native Mapuche warriors led by Pelantaro ambushed and wiped out a Spanish column at the Battle of Curalaba. In 1598 a general uprising developed among the Mapuche and Huilliche people of southern Chile. The subsequent Arauco War was to smolder for over 250 years but its immediate effect was the so-called "Destruction of the Seven Cities": the Spanish cities of Angol, La Imperial, Osorno, Santa Cruz de Oñez, Valdivia and Villarrica were either destroyed or abandoned. Only Chillán and Concepción resisted the Mapuche sieges and attacks. With the exception of the Chiloé Archipelago all the Chilean territory south of Bío Bío River became free of Spanish rule. The abandoned city of Valdivia turned into an attractive site for Spain's enemies to control since it would allow them to establish a base amidst Spain's Chilean possessions.

==== Dutch interest in Valdivia ====
In 1600, local Huilliches joined the Dutch corsair Baltazar de Cordes in attacking the Spanish settlement of Castro in Chiloé. While this was an opportunistic assault, the Spanish correctly believed the Dutch could attempt to ally with the Mapuches and establish a stronghold in southern Chile. Over time the Spanish became aware of actual Dutch plans to establish themselves at the ruins of Valdivia and so attempted to re-establish Spanish rule there before the arrival of the Dutch. These efforts were thwarted in the 1630s by the impossibility of establishing an overland route through the territory of the hostile Mapuches. The ruins of Valdivia, at the head of its splendid natural harbour, remained a tempting target for Spain's enemies.

In 1643, the Dutch arrived at the ruins and settled in the zone, planning to use Valdivia as a base for attacks on the Spanish Empire. After some conflicts with the Mapuche Indians of the zone, the Dutch had to leave Valdivia.

=== Re-establishment of Spanish rule ===
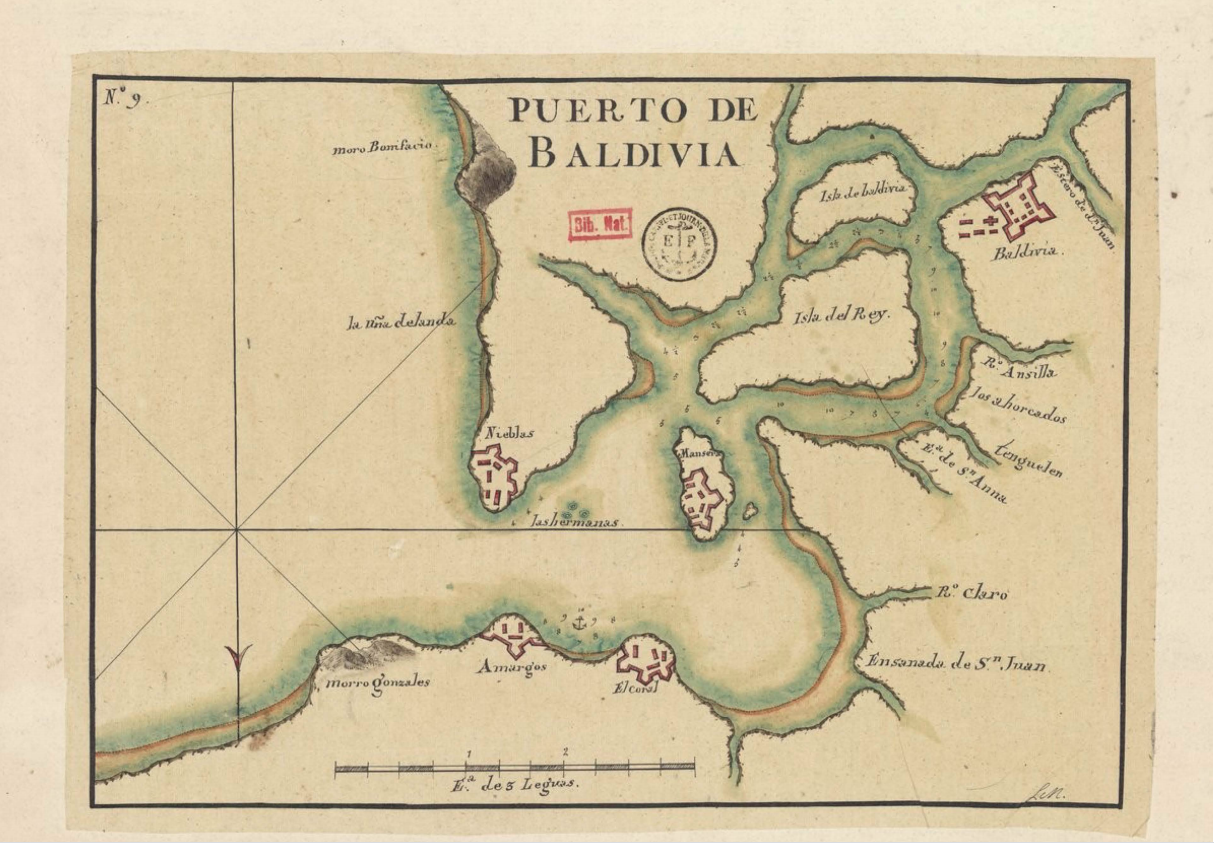
18th-century map of Corral Bay and its four main fortresses.

Unaware of the Dutch departure Governor of Chile Francisco López de Zúñiga dispatched Juan de Acevedo in charge of a ship to Valdivia to gather information on April 30, 1644. De Acevedo reached Corral Bay by May noticing that the Dutch were nowhere to be found. Having heard from the now pro-Spanish Mapuche chief Juan Manqueante that the Dutch planned to return, Pedro de Toledo conceived an occupation of Valdivia by a synchronous advance by the Spanish army in Chile by land and by a fleet sent from Peru. De Toledo ordered 2,000 men to march over land from Central Chile to resettle Valdivia and fortify it. These troops penetrated Mapuche territory following the coast south and reached Toltén River on February 9, 1645. Reaching so far south was a feat in itself since the Spanish had not been around these places in the last 50 years. At this point the army had met considerable harassment from the Mapuches. The killing of scouting auxiliaries in conjunction with uncertainty regarding the arrival by sea of the Spanish from Peru made López de Zúñiga retreat back north. (Note: This failure would cost López de Zúñiga a heavy price as De Toledo made severe accusations against him. At the end López de Zúñiga would have to justify his failure to reach Valdivia before the King of Spain.) De Toledo's naval expedition was made up of twenty ships and 1,000 men from El Callao in Peru. The large fleet, which gained a further two ships in Chile, was unprecedented in the region and astounded contemporary observers. It arrived at Valdivia in February 1645 without incident and disembarked the soldiers with their equipment and supplies. The Spanish disinterred and burned Brouwer's body.

The soldiers of the new garrison and the artisans dispatched with them commenced construction of a system of defensive fortifications. These would become the Valdivian Fort System, the most important defensive complex of the American South Pacific coast. It is an exceptional example of the Hispanic-American school of fortification. Spanish authorities had convicts from all-over the Viceroyalty of Peru sent to build the fort system, with the Spanish settlements in Corral Bay effectively becoming penal colonies. To avoid prisoner escapes the Spanish reached agreements with local Mapuches paying them for the recovery of fugitives. The convicts, many of whom were Afro-Peruvians, became later soldier-settlers once they had served their sentence. A 1749 census in Valdivia shows that Afro-descendants had a strong presence in the area. In the 17th century Spanish soldiers lived together with local Mapuche in the fort, some of whom were slaves. Close contacts with the Mapuches made that many soldiers and prisoners had a certain command of Mapuche language.

The building and maintenance of the fortifications was a heavy burden for the Spanish colonial finances but this was felt necessary in order to defend the southern approaches to Peru, the colony which, along with Mexico, constituted the main source of wealth for the Spanish Crown. Investments in the defense of Corral Bay were validated in 1670 when a fully armed ship commanded by John Narborough arrived to the bay rising suspicions of an imminent English attack.

As Futahuillimapu and the whole area between Valdivia and the settlements of Calbuco and Carelmapu remained independent indigenous territory closed to the Spanish, the Spanish had to rely on hearsay for information. This lack of concrete knowledge of the territory fueled substantial speculations about the mythical City of the Caesars among Valdivians.

=== Post-Seven Years' War overhaul ===
In the second half of the 18th century, a thorough plan was carried forward for restoring and improving the fortresses. The engineers José Birt and Juan Garland were commissioned for the task. The defensive complex of Valdivia reached the point of having 17 bastions, with surveillance installations, castles, fortresses and batteries. This complex would exert during the Colony a thoroughly efficacious deterrent effect, since, in fact, it frustrated the raids of the rival powers.

With Spain and Great Britain at war again in the 1770s due to the American Revolutionary War local Spanish authorities in Chile received in 1779 the warning that a British fleet commanded by Edward Hughes was heading to Chilean coasts for an imminent attack. As consequence, the Viceroyalty of Peru send economic aid to the garrisons at Valparaíso and Valdivia. The suspected attack did however never happen.

=== Independence era ===
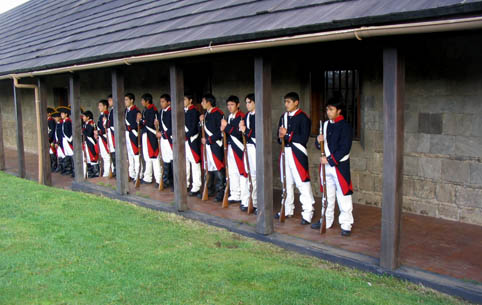
Niebla Fort's former headquarters (now a museum), during a representation of the capture of Valdivia

==== Mackenna controversy ====
A varied list of 18th-century and early 19th-century authors in Chile, Spain and the rest of Europe concurred on the strategic importance of Valdivia and its harbour. A notable dissident was the Governor of Osorno Juan Mackenna who argued in a 1810 report for diminishing the size of the garrison protecting Valdivia and distribute resources aimed at it elsewhere. This report was rebuked by Manuel Olaguer Feliú, the chief military engineer involved in the designs of the defences of Valdivia. Mackenna's thesis that controlling fortified positions was unnecessary to conquer a territory was contradicted both by the experiences of the Peninsular War and by Cochrane's decision to attack the Valdivia Fort System itself in 1820. According to historian Gabriel Guarda Mackenna was more concerned about controlling resources than of providing valid arguments.

The report of which Mackenna was the author was also signed by Juan Egaña and José Samaniego. It came to be strongly disliked by the soldiers of Valdivia once it was known and it contributed to usher a counterrevolutionary coup on March 26, 1812 that took control of the city and created a War Council. The War Council broke trade relations with the rest of Chile and confirmed Valdivia's loyalty to the Spanish government.

==== Patriot capture ====
Military engineer Manuel Olaguer Feliú thought that the fort of Aguada del Inglés, the same place where John Narborough had approached the coast, would be the landing place for an enemy attack on the fort system. For this purpose in Olaguer Feliú's plans this fort had to concentrate most of the troops in case of war.

Lord Cochrane's landing on Aguada del Inglés in 1820 validated the plan of Olaguer Feliú

== Forts, batteries, and outposts ==
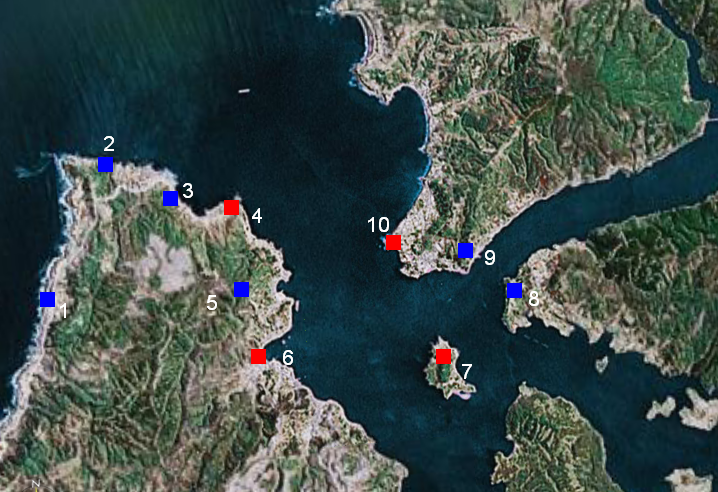
Map of Corral Bay and the location of the coastal defences. The four largest forts are marked with red

The four largest forts in this system were the forts in Corral Bay that controlled the entry to Valdivia River, thus Valdivia. Other fortifications were built to defend the city from land attacks (mostly from indigenous Huilliches).

- Fuerte Aguada del Inglés

It was located 8 kilometers from the Port of Corral outside the bay. It is the exact fort were the Taking of Valdivia began by lord Thomas Alexander Cochrane.

- Fuerte de San Carlos
- Batería del Barro
- Castillo de San Luís de Alba de Amargos
- Batería y Reducto de Chorocamayo
- Castillo de San Sebastián de la Cruz Fort (Corral Fort)

San Sebastián de la Cruz Fort in Corral at the southern side of Corral Bay was the headquarters of the coastal defences. It was built in 1645 by order of the viceroy Pedro Álvarez de Toledo y Leiva.

- Castillo de San Pedro de Alcántara (Isla Mancera Fort)

The fort of Mancera Island lies between Niebla and Corral. Due to its strategical location, several times the city of Valdivia was proposed to be moved into the small Mancera Island – a proposal Valdivias citizens opposed.

- Batería del Carbonero
- Batería del Piojo
- Castillo de la Pura y Limpia Concepción de Monfort de Lemus (Niebla Fort)

The fort in Niebla faces Corral Fort and lies at the northern entrance of Valdivia River. The fort was undergoing an enlargement when works stopped in 1810. In 1834, when controlled by Chile it worked as deposit for the whole system.

- San Luis de Alba Fort (not shown in the map)

San Luis de Alba Fort is located in the shores Cruces River north of Valdivia. It was built to secure the land route (Camino Real) to Valdivia where the road passed by the river.

- Los Torreones (not shown in the map)

Los Torreones (Spanish: The Towers) are two towers built once in what was the outskirts of Valdivia to protect the city against land attacks. The towers are now a local landmark and are used as logo by the local newspaper El Diario Austral de Valdivia.
