= Mancera Island =

Island in Corral Bay, Chile

Native name: Isla Mancera
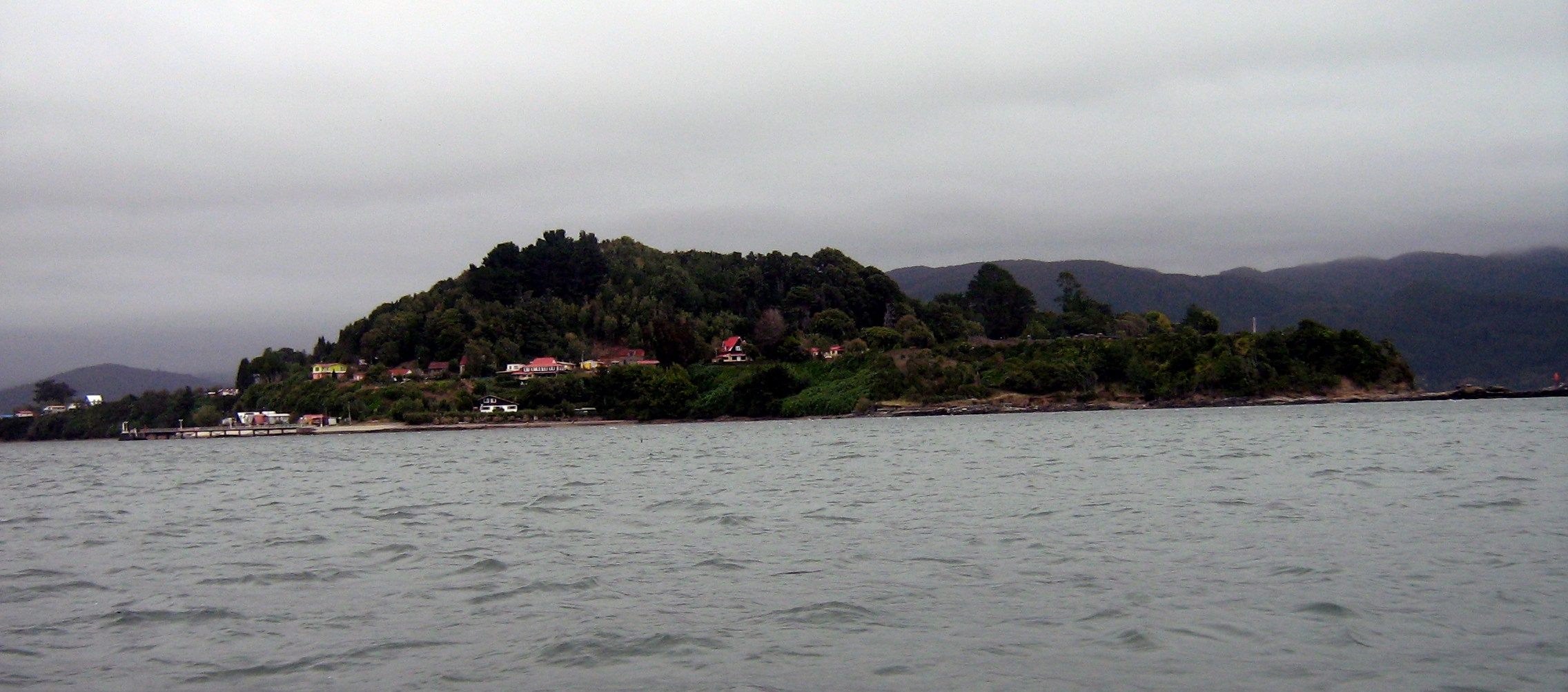
- Mancera Island, view from Niebla, Chile

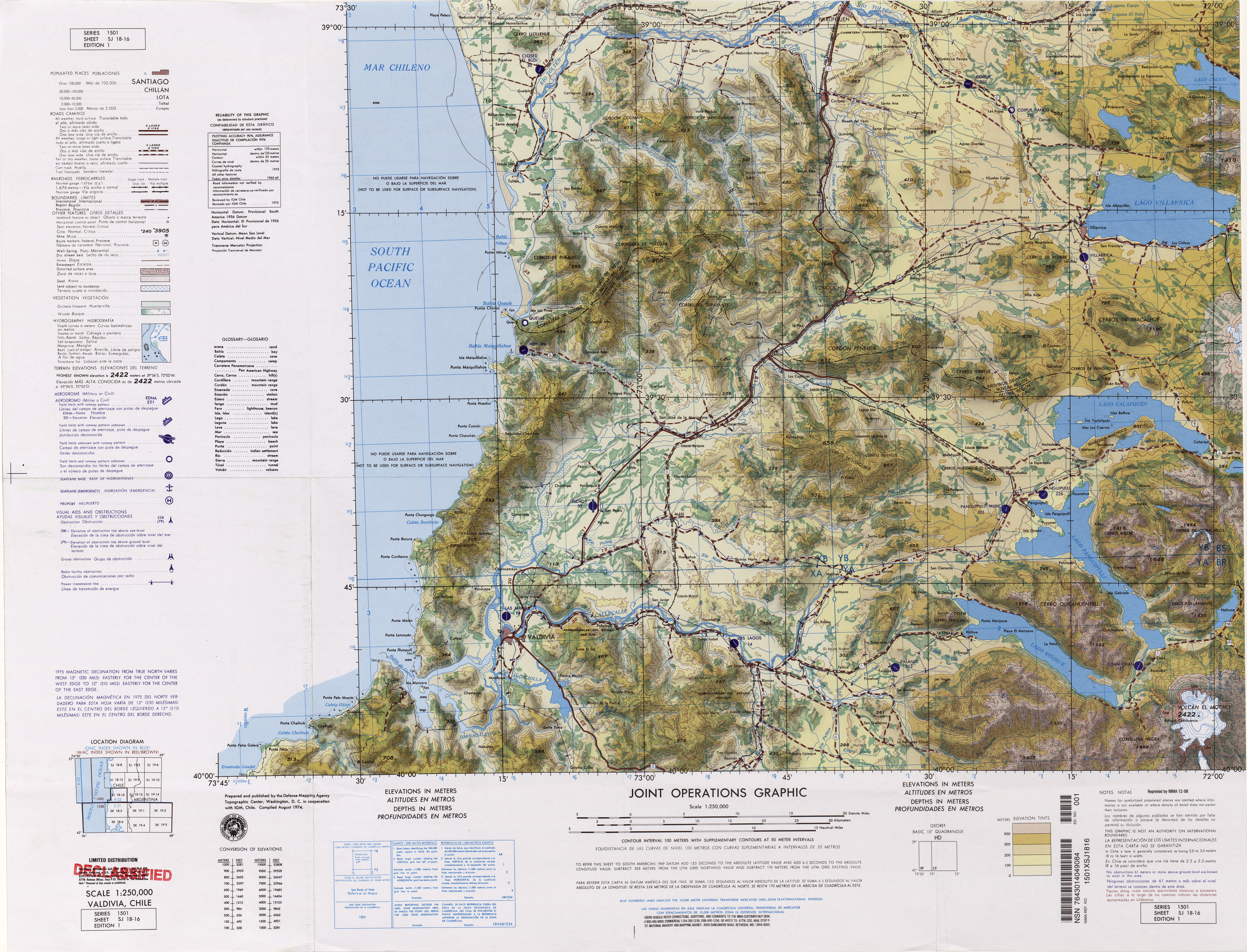
- Regional map

Geography
- Coordinates: 39°53′26″S 73°23′36″W
- Adjacent to: Valdivia River
- Length: 1,300 m (4300 ft)
- Width: 650 m (2130 ft)
- Highest point: 89

Administration
- Chile
- Region: Los Ríos
- Province: Valdivia
- Commune: Valdivia

Demographics
- Population: 53 (2002)

Mancera Island (Spanish: Isla Mancera) is a minor island at the mouth of Valdivia River in Corral Bay.

Prior to being named after the Marquis of Mancera the island was known as Güiguacabin (from ühueñn, "whistle", or ühua, "maize", and cahuin, "party") to the indigenous Mapuches. In his 1544 expedition Juan Bautista Pastene, made the island known for the Spanish and named it Imperial. Later the island became known to the Spanish as Constantino after its owner Constantino Pérez, then it was known for a time as Santa Ines. The name finally settled as Mancera after the Spanish viceroy of Peru Pedro de Toledo, 1st Marquis of Mancera, who ordered the fortification of the island. The fort in Mancera Island begun to be built in 1646 receiving the names Castillo de San Pedro de Alcántara de Mancera or simply Castillo de Mancera. The fort was a vital point in the Valdivian Fort System, allowing with the aid of the forts in Corral and Niebla to crossfire any ship attempting to sail upstream to the city of Valdivia.

In 1682, after Valdivia was badly damaged by a fire it was proposed to move the city to Mancera Island. A similar proposal of moving the city to Mancera Island was done in 1721 in order to protect it against a potential British attack as Spain and Britain were at war. As result of the partial, and eventually reversed move of Valdivia to the island, in the 18th century Mancera Island achieved for a while an upsurge of population and the establishment of numerous buildings made of bricks and wood. At its height in the 18th century, the fort had twenty cannons and hosted one church and two convents. The decline in importance of Mancera Island in the fort system meant that by 1820, when Corral Bay was attacked by Patriots, it hosted only a small garrison and one battery of six cannons.

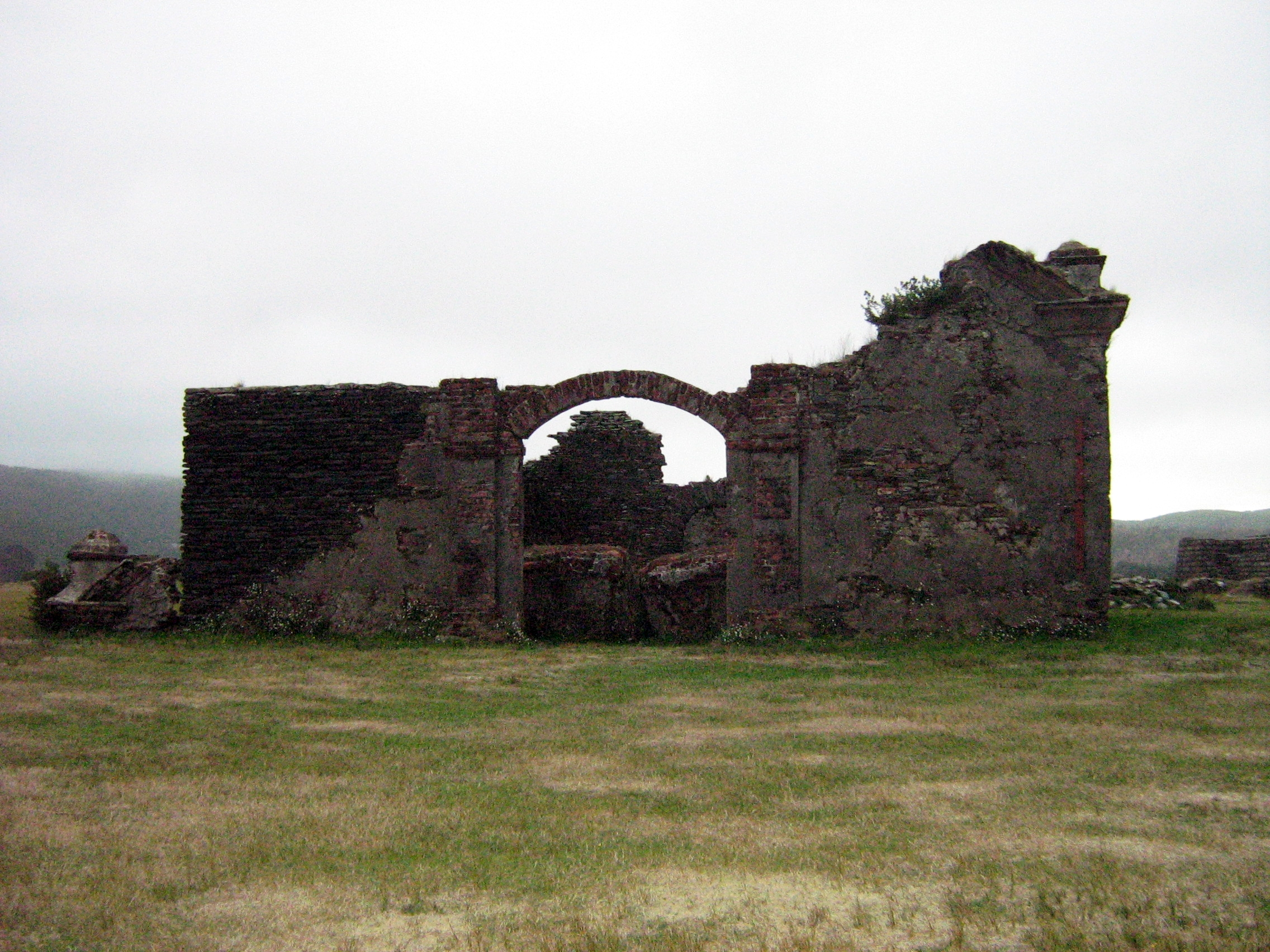
Ruins of the Franciscan convent in the island

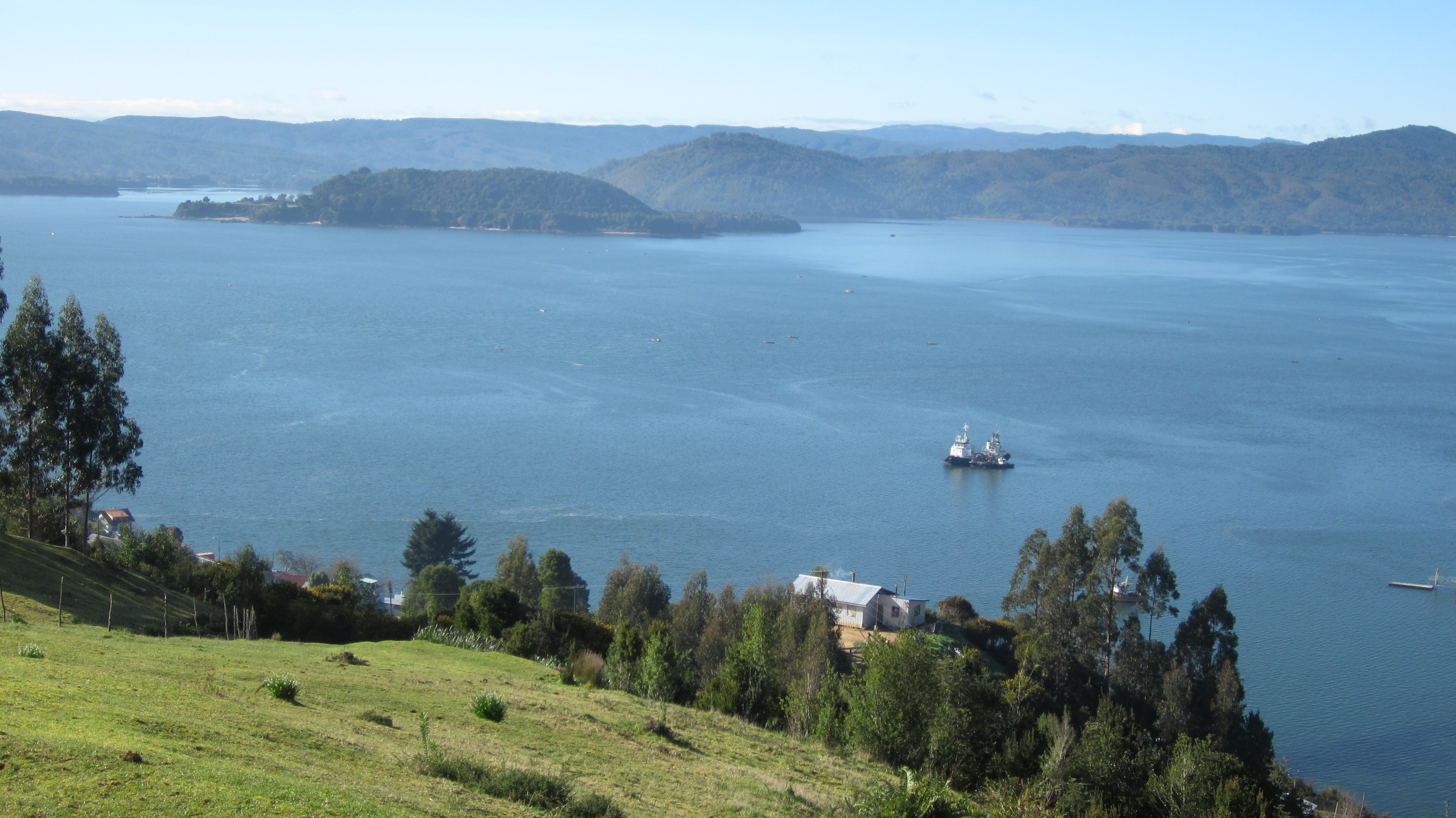
Position of Mancera Island in Corral Bay. View from Corral.

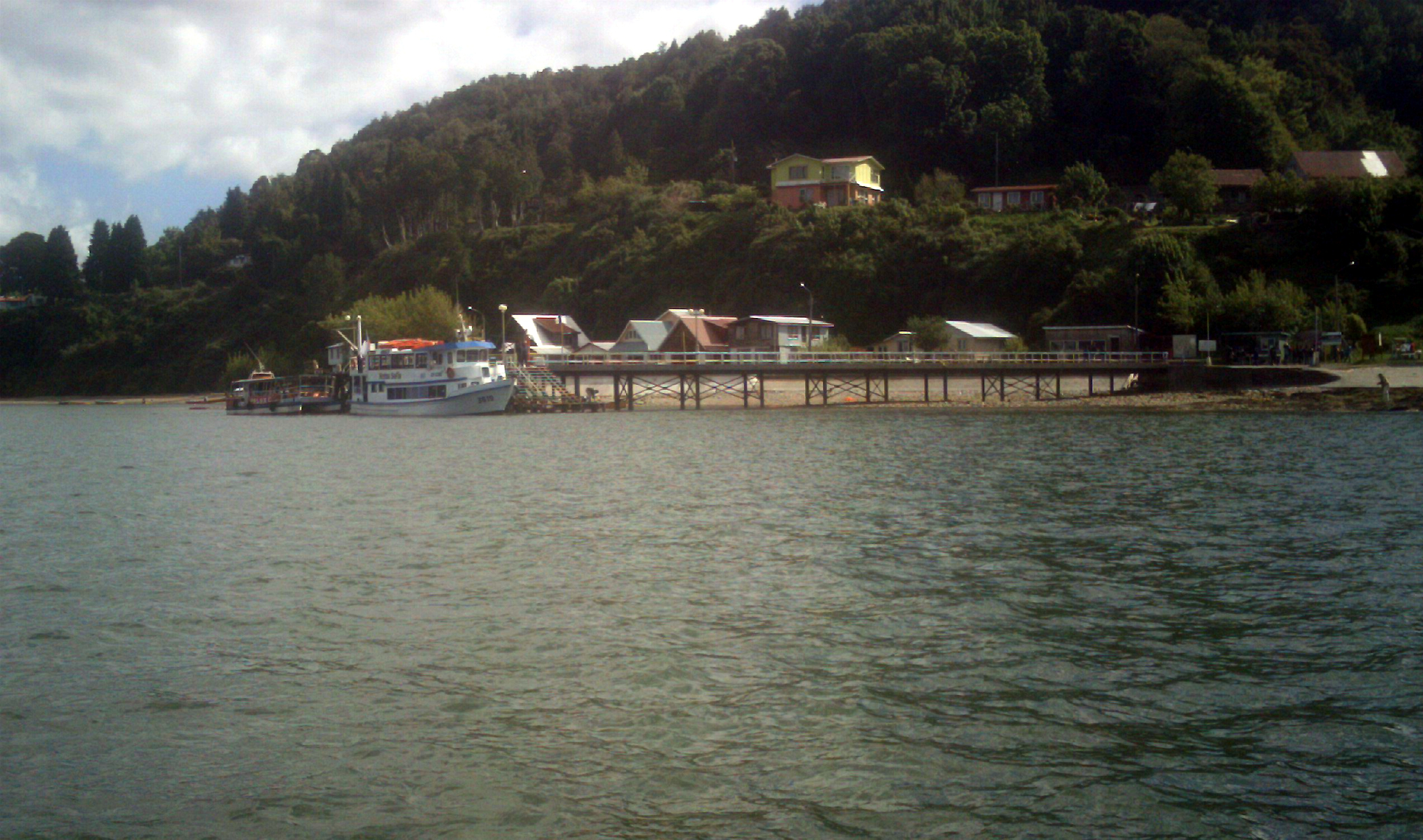
Pier of Mancera Island

== See also ==
- Valdivian Fort System
- Capture of Valdivia
