= Corral Bay =

Bay in the mouth of the Valdivia River, southern Chile

Coordinates: 39.85°S 73.425°W

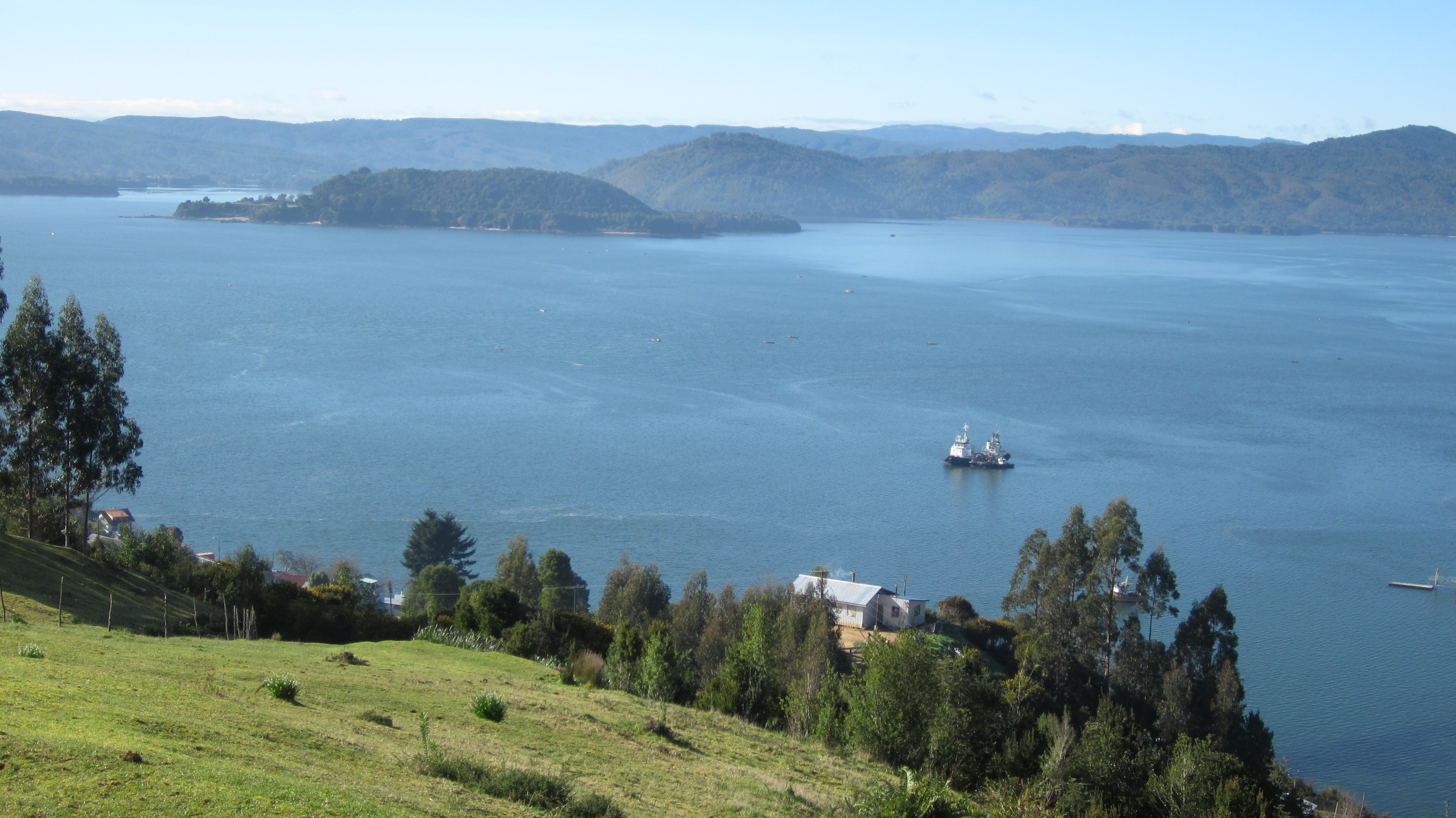
View of Corral Bay from the southwest with Mancera Island in the upper left quadrant.

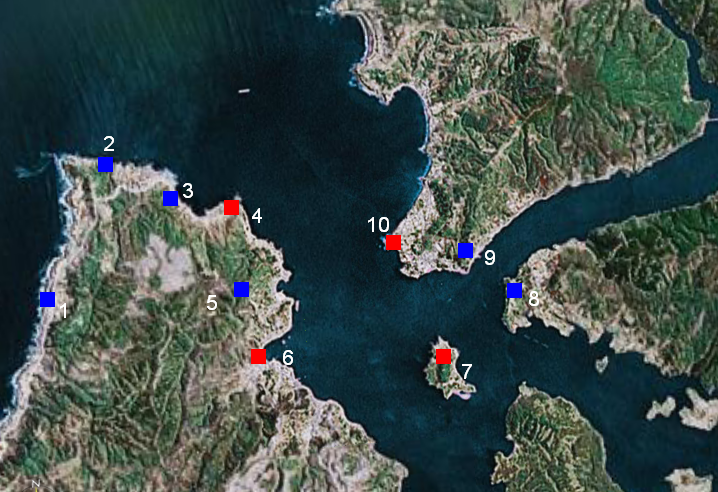
Map of Corral Bay and the location of the coastal defences. The four largest forts are marked with red

Corral Bay is a bay in the mouth of the Valdivia River, southern Chile. Its main towns are Corral and Niebla. The mouth of the bay is between Juan Latorre point and Morro Gonzalo, with a width of 5.5 km. All the year the bay is transited by merchant, transport and fish boats. The bay is famous for being one of the most fortified bays in Spanish America in colonial time (see: Valdivian Fort System).

The outer limits of the bay are Morro Gonzalo in the southwest and Punta Juan Latorre in the northeast. The amplitude of the tide is of 1.28 m. Except the areas next to shores the depths of the bay range from 4.5 to 15 m.
