= Pedro de Toledo, 1st Marquis of Mancera =

Spanish nobleman, general, colonial administrator and diplomat

Don Pedro Álvarez de Toledo Marqués de Mancera Caballero de Alcántara
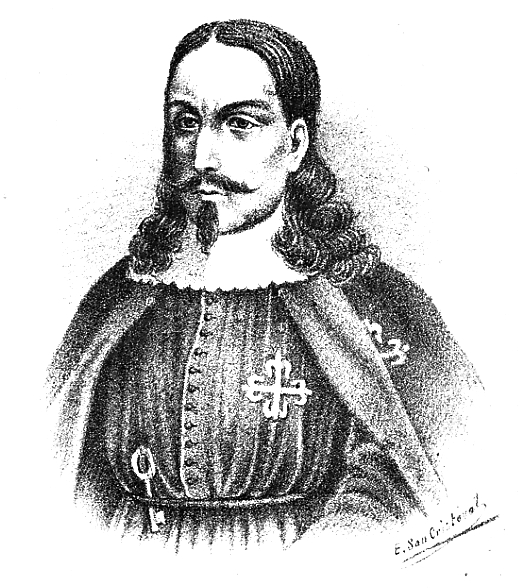
- Portrait by Evaristo San Cristóval

15th Viceroy of Peru
- In office December 18, 1639 – September 20, 1648
- Monarch: Philip IV
- Valido: Count-Duke of Olivares; Luis de Haro
- Preceded by: The Count of Chinchón
- Succeeded by: The Count of Salvatierra

Personal details
- Born: c.1585 Madrid, Spain
- Died: March 9, 1654 (aged 68–69) Madrid, Spain
- Spouse(s): Luisa Feijóo de Novoa; María Luisa de Salazar
- Children: Francisca, Antonio, Antonia
- Profession: Lieutenant General
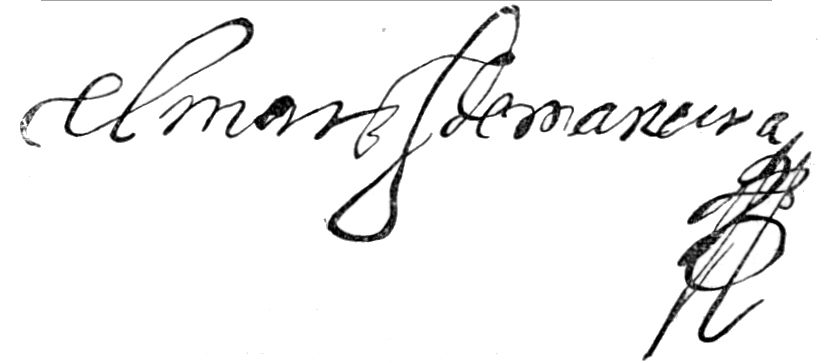
- Signature

Pedro Álvarez de Toledo y Leiva, 1st Marquis of Mancera (c. 1585–1654), was a Spanish nobleman, general, colonial administrator, and diplomat. He served as Captain General of Galicia and Viceroy of Peru from December 18, 1639 to September 20, 1648.

== Early life ==
Pedro de Toledo was the son of Don Luis de Toledo, 4th Lord of Mancera, and of his second wife Isabel de Leiva. He served with the Spanish armies in Italy, rising to the rank of lieutenant general in the royal galleys of Sicily.

King Philip IV of Spain raised his title from Lord to Marquis of Mancera in 1623. Thereafter he served eight years as Governor and Captain General of Galicia.

== Viceroy of Peru ==
Pedro de Toledo was named the 15th Viceroy of Peru in 1639, at the age of 54. He traveled to the Viceroyalty of Peru with his son Antonio Sebastián de Toledo, who later became the Viceroy of New Spain (1664–73) and 2nd Marquis of Mancera.

As viceroy, Pedro de Toledo introduced the papel sellado (literally, sealed paper). He expanded the naval forces and fortified the ports of Valdivia, Valparaíso, Arica and Callao. In Callao he ordered the construction of a 4 kilometres (2.5 mi) long defensive wall, which was completed in 1647. Isla Mancera, an island at the mouth of the Valdivia River, is named after him.

He organized literary discussion parties, tertulias a formalized kind of official salon. In these was introduced the mancerina, a ceramic or silver saucer with a framework for holding a jícara, or chocolate cup. The manufacture of mancerinas later became an industry in the Spanish towns of Manises and Talavera.

At the end of his term as viceroy, Pedro de Toledo returned to Spain. He died in Madrid in 1654.

== Descendants ==
Pedro de Toledo was married first to Luisa Feijóo de Novoa y Zamudio, with whom he had one daughter. In 1621 he married for a second time with María Luisa de Salazar y Enríquez de Navarra, 3rd Lady of El Mármol, with whom he had another two children.

By Luisa Feijóo de Novoa:

- Francisca María de Toledo, 2nd Marchioness of Belvis, married Diego Sarmiento de Acuña, 2nd Count of Gondomar

- Pedro Sarmiento, 3rd Marquis of Mancera

By María Luisa de Salazar:

- Antonio Sebastián Álvarez de Toledo, 2nd Marquis of Mancera
- Antonia María de Toledo, married Pedro Garcés, 14th Count of Priego

== Ancestry ==
8. Pedro de Toledo; 1st Lord of Mancera
4. Enrique de Toledo; 3rd Lord of Mancera
9. Leonor de Ayala
2. Luis de Toledo; 4th Lord of Mancera
10. Diego de Castilla; 3rd Lord of Gor
5. Isabel de Mendoza
11. Beatriz de Mendoza
1. Pedro Álvarez de Toledo
12. Sancho Martínez; Lord of the house of Leiva
6. Sancho Martínez de Leiva; Lord of the house of Leiva
13. Francisca Ladrón de Guevara
3. Isabel de Leiva
14. Garcí II Hurtado de Mendoza; 8th Lord of la Corzana
7. Leonor de Mendoza
15. Ana de Leiva

== Additional information ==
=== Sources ===
- Castro Pereira Mouzinho de Albuquerque e Cunha, Fernando de (1995). Instrumentário Genealógico - Linhagens Milenárias (in Portuguese). pp. 329–30.
- Hobbs, Nicolas (2007). "Grandes de España" (in Spanish). Archived from the original on October 25, 2008.
- Instituto de Salazar y Castro. Elenco de Grandezas y Titulos Nobiliarios Españoles (in Spanish). periodic publication.

Government offices
| Preceded by The Count of Chinchón | Viceroy of Peru; 1639–1648 | Succeeded by The Count of Salvatierra |
Spanish nobility
| New title | Marquis of Mancera; 1623–1654 | Succeeded by Antonio Sebastián de Toledo |
