= Mancera de Arriba =

- municipality
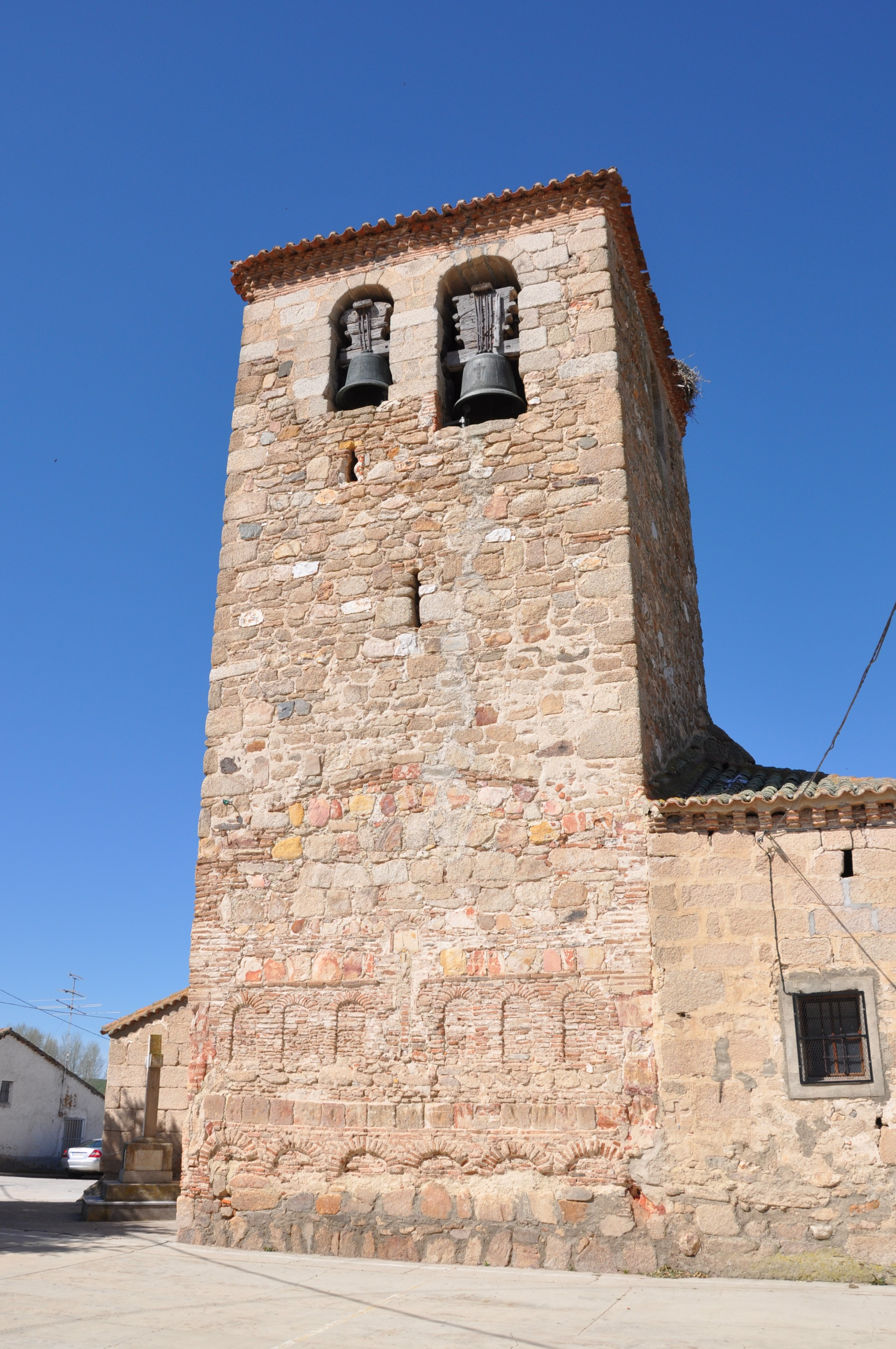
- Church Mudéjar of St. Thomas the Apostle in Mancera de Arriba.
- Flag Coat of arms
- Location in Spain. Mancera de Arriba (Spain)
- Coordinates: 40°47′28″N 5°08′50″W
- Country: Spain
- Autonomous community: Castile and León
- Province: Ávila
- Municipality: Mancera de Arriba

Area
  - Total: 17.59 km^{2} (6.79 sq mi)
- Elevation: 934 m (3,064 ft)

Population (2025-01-01)
  - Total: 66
  - Density: 3.8/km^{2} (9.7/sq mi)
- Time zone: UTC+1 (CET)
  - Summer (DST): UTC+2 (CEST)
- Website: Official website

Mancera de Arriba is a municipality located in the province of Ávila, Castile and León, Spain.

== Population ==
Historical population
Year	Pop.	±% p.a.
2023	71	—
2024	70	−1.41%
2025	66	−5.71%
Source: INE
