= Pedro Sarmiento, 3rd Marquis of Mancera =

Spanish nobleman

Pedro Sarmiento, 3rd Marquis of Mancera and Count of Gondomar, Grandee of Spain (c. 1625 – 1715) was a Spanish nobleman.

He was the son of Don Diego Sarmiento de Acuña, 2nd Count of Gondomar and of Francisca María de Toledo.

== Descendants ==
Pedro Sarmiento married María Josefa de Carvajal, condesa del Puerto (died 1693) with whom he had two daughters. He married for a second time with Inés de Palafox, with whom he had one more daughter.

By María Josefa de Carvajal:

- Teresa (died young in 1700)
- Mariana de la Encarnación Sarmiento (died 1748), 4th Marchioness of Mancera, married twice. No issue.

By Inés de Palafox:

- Joaquina Josefa Sarmiento, 5th Marchioness of Mancera, married Juan Francisco Pimentel, 6th Marquis of Malpica. Had issue.

== Ancestry ==
8.
4. Diego Sarmiento de Acuña; 1st Count of Gondomar
9.
2. Diego Sarmiento de Acuña; 2nd Count of Gondomar
10.
5. Constanza de Acuña
11.
1. Pedro Sarmiento
12. Luis de Toledo; 4th Lord of Mancera
6. Pedro de Toledo; 1st Marquis of Mancera
13. Isabel de Leiva
3. Francisca María de Toledo
14.
7. Luisa Feijóo de Novoa
15.

== Additional information ==
=== Sources ===
- Castro Pereira Mouzinho de Albuquerque e Cunha, Fernando de (1995). Instrumentário Genealógico - Linhagens Milenárias (in Portuguese). pp. 329–30.
- Hobbs, Nicolas (2007). "Grandes de España" (in Spanish). Archived from the original on October 25, 2008.
- Instituto de Salazar y Castro. Elenco de Grandezas y Titulos Nobiliarios Españoles (in Spanish). periodic publication.

Spanish nobility
Preceded by Antonio Sebastián de Toledo	Marquis of Mancera; 1710–1710	Succeeded by Mariana; Sarmiento de Vargas
Preceded by Diego; Sarmiento de Acuña	Count of Gondomar; 1710–1710	Succeeded by Mariana; Sarmiento de Vargas
