= Railef =

Railef (Srayülef) was an apo ülmen of the Mapuche-Huilliche people in western Futahuillimapu. He was the son of Catrihuala from whom he inherited the position of apo ülmen. During the Chilean Independence War Patriot Coronel Jorge Beauchef arrived to his lands with an army. Railef supported Beauchef and his kona (warriors) fought according to oral tradition alongside Chilean patriots against the Spanish in the Battle of El Toro which they won. Railefs support for the patriots was likely a breach of the accord at Parliament of Las Canoas signed in 1793 where his father had promised to support Spain against its enemies.
