= Catrihuala =

Catrihuala (Katrüwala) was an apo ülmen of the Mapuche-Huilliche people in western Futahuillimapu. He was the father of Railef (Srayülef) who inherited the position of apo ülmen. During Catrihuala's time as apo ülmen he had to deal with the devastating incursion of Tomás de Figueroa. In the aftermath of this attack Catrihuala participated in the Spanish-Mapuche parliament of las Parliament of Las Canoas.
