= Battle of El Toro =

Coordinates: 41°09′11″S 73°25′50″W

- Part of the Chilean War of Independence
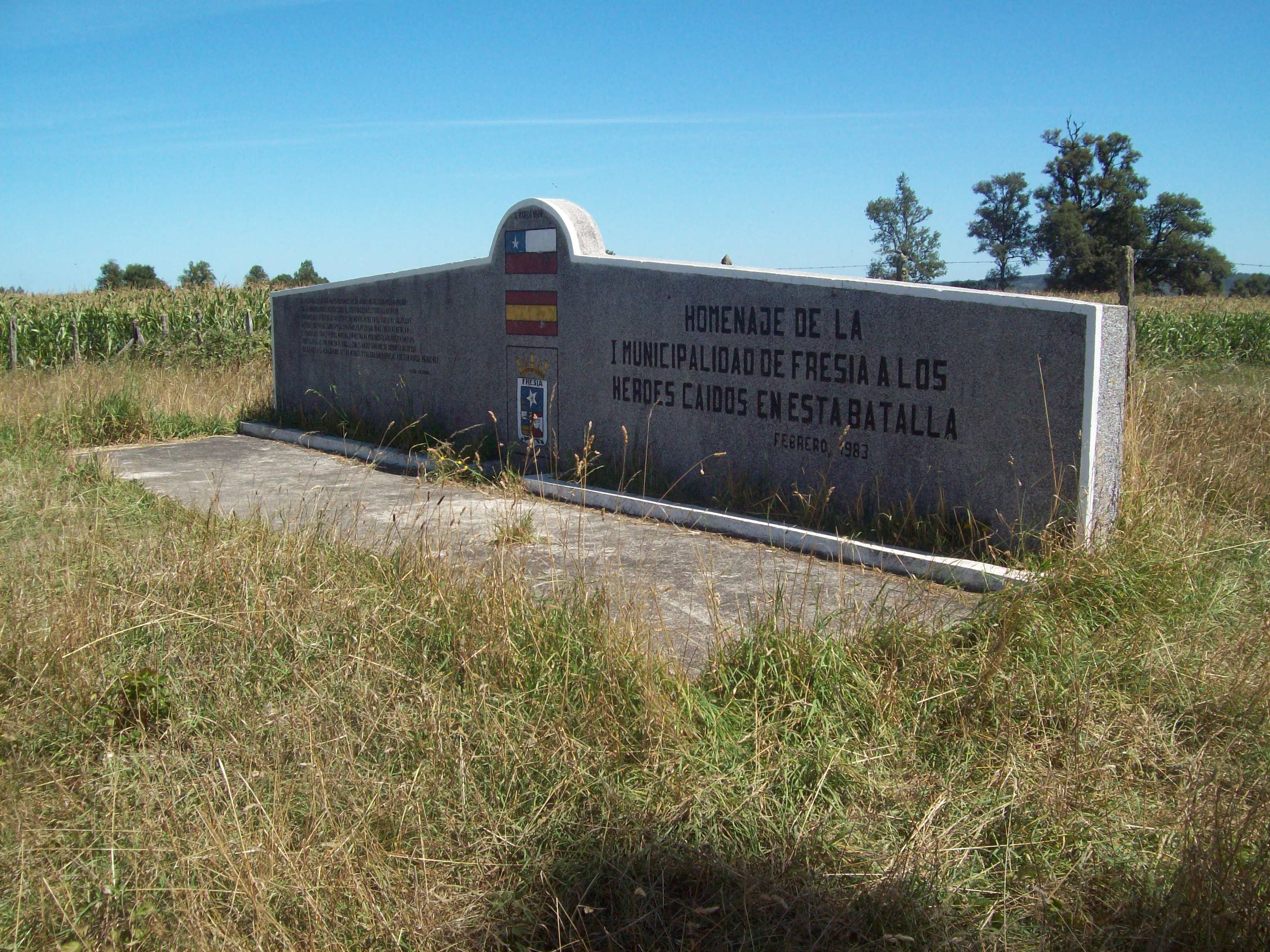
- Monument of the battle of El Toro, March 6, 1820, Chilean war of independence .
Date	March 6, 1820
Location	Hacienda El Toro, near Tegualda in Fresia commune
Result	Patriot victory

Belligerents
Chilean patriots Lof of Railef	(Spain) Royalists

Commanders and leaders
Jorge Beauchef; José María Labé	(Spain) Gaspar Fernández de Bobadilla (Spain) Miguel Senosiaín

Strength
140; 2 cannons	300

Casualties and losses
11 killed 29 wounded	~40 killed 106 prisoners

The Battle of El Toro (March 6, 1820) was fought near Maullín, Chile between Chilean patriots and Spanish royalists, during the Chilean War of Independence.

== Background ==
After the capture of Valdivia, Lord Cochrane departed, leaving Colonel Jorge Beauchef as commander and governor of Valdivia. Beauchef decided to head south in order to secure Osorno, to expel the remains of the royalist forces from the Chilean mainland and to take possession of the area south to the Maullín River, so that the Spanish would not be able to reoccupy Valdivia by land. His main worry was a possible regrouping of the Royalist forces in the area, since they far outnumbered his own. Beauchef and his small army arrived at Trumao where they were aided by local Mapuche-Huilliche who ferried them over Bueno River and provided the Spanish with ox carts. Beuchef reciprocated by giving the Mapuche-Huilliche liqueur and indigo dye which he had brought with him for this end. Oral traditions seem to indicate that local Mapuche-Huilliche joined the patriot army and fought in the battle. This support was in breach with the Parliament of Las Canoas where Mapuche-Huilliche had agreed to support Spain against its enemies.

Previous to this battle, all the royalists garrisons that had managed to escape from the cities of Valdivia and Osorno gathered at the Carelmapu Fort. The governor of Chiloé Brigadier Antonio de Quintanilla was disgusted with the poor performance of the old colonel Manuel Montoya and replaced him with Gaspar Fernández de Bobadilla and captain Miguel Senosiaín, and ordered them to return north and combat the patriots. Bobadilla and Senosiain re-crossed the Maullín River at the head of 300 soldiers.

== The battle ==
On March 6, Colonel Beauchef sent an advanced scouting group of 50 soldiers under the command of captain José María Labé. As the scouting party was advancing south, they were attacked by the royalists, who ambushed them from a forest near the Hacienda El Toro. Labé managed to maintain his ground for about an hour answering the fire, but finally started to retreat overwhelmed by the numerically superior enemy.

The royalists came out of their shelters and started to closely pursue the patriots, who by then were in full retreat. When Beauchef heard the shots, he decided to intervene with the 90 soldiers under his command, while allowing Labe's troop to move to his rear, in order for them to rest and recharge his ammunition. The Royalist were then left to face the fresh and entrenched patriot forces, who faced them with increased firepower. As they didn't know how big were Beauchef's forces, they became discouraged and demoralized, and halted their attack.

Beauchef immediately seized the opportunity and ordered a frontal bayonet counter-charge with all the forces under his command, causing the Royalists to flee. The patriots, using the horses captured to the enemy began an implacable persecution. The Spanish royalists left the field, leaving behind 40 dead, 106 prisoners and 140 guns and most of their ammunition. Beauchef lost 11 soldiers and had 29 injured.
