= Junta General de Caciques =

Junta General de Caciques was a Mapuche-Huilliche organization active in Futahuillimapu between 1936 and 1985. The organization had its roots in the Parliament of Las Canoas held between Mapuche-Huilliche and Spanbish colonial authorities in 1793. The organization insisted in that apo ülmen should be considered local authorities.
