= Huilliche uprising =

There have been various uprisings by Huilliche people through history. While the specifics vary, all of these uprisings were against the Spanish colonial order.

- Mapuche uprising of 1598–1604 in which Huilliches succeeded in destroying Osorno in 1604.
- Huilliche uprising of 1712 in Chiloé Archipelago
- Huilliche uprising of 1792 in Río Bueno
