= Battle of Mocopulli =

- Part of the Chilean War of Independence
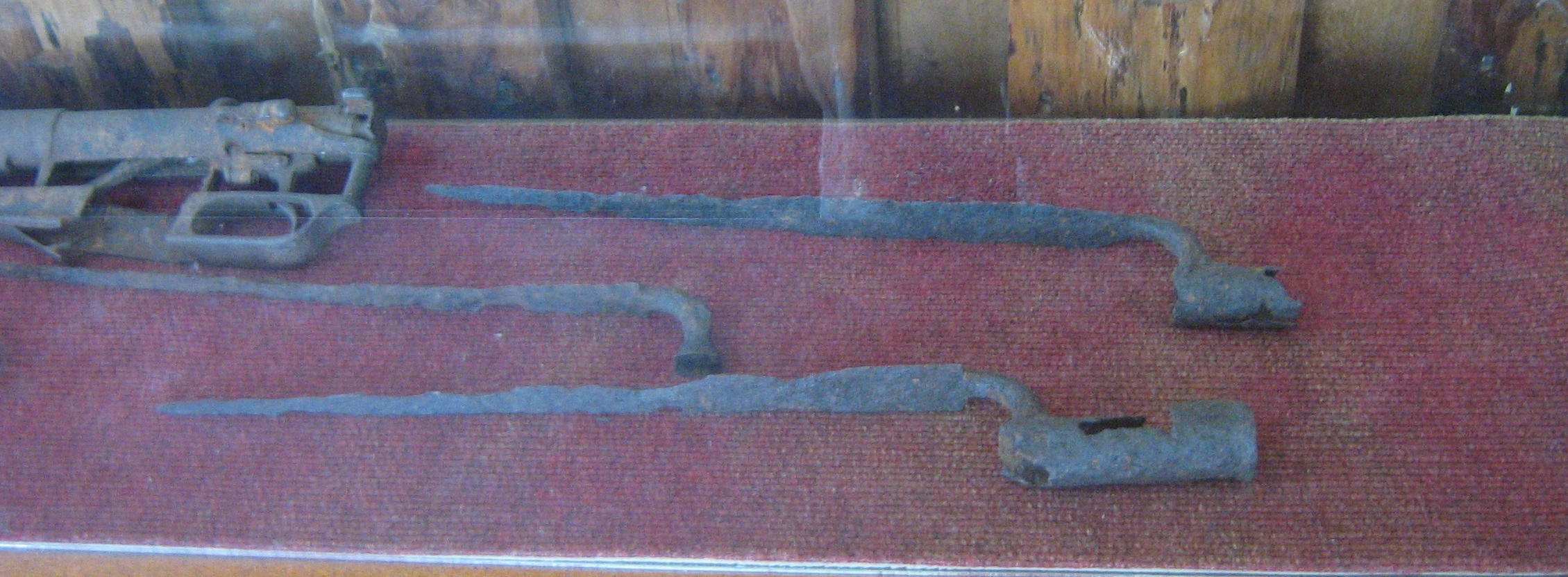
- Bayonets recovered from the battlefield of Mocopulli
Date	April 1, 1824
Location	Mocopulli, Chiloé Island; 42°19′54″S 73°42′29″W
Result	Royalist victory, invasion aborted

Belligerents
Republic of Chile	(Spain) Chiloé royalists

Commanders and leaders
(Chile) Jorge Beauchef	(Spain) José Rodríguez Ballesteros

Strength
~600	~1,000

Casualties and losses
~300 dead and wounded	~150 dead and wounded

The Battle of Mocopulli (Spanish: Batalla de Mocopulli) was fought on April 1 of 1824 as the culmination of a Chilean patriots invasion plan against royalist Chiloé. The battle concluded in a royalist victory that delayed the incorporation of Chiloé into Chile to 1826 when a new invasion was launched.

During all off the Chilean Independence War Chiloé Archipelago had remained under control of the royalist which enjoyed a wide support in the archipelago. In 1820 Lord Cochrane, with the newly created Chilean Navy, had disembarked William Miller in Chiloé to capture the island for Chile. Cochrane's hoped to repeat the success at Valdivia where he with only 350 men had captured the largest Spanish defensive complex in Chile. William Miller's 60-men strong expedition suffered heavy casualties in the Battle of Agüi and had to retreat back to the ships. When Ramón Freire came to power as supreme director of Chile in 1823, one of his first actions was to plan the capture of Chiloé. Freire's invasion army crossed Chacao Channel in March 1824. The troops occupied without resistance the village of Chacao and then continued south and disembarked in the town of Dalcahue. The Chilean plan was to perform a pincer movement and head north to attack San Carlos de Chiloé (Ancud) from Dalcahue while troops disembarked in the north of the island. The Chiloé royalists ambushed the Chileans in a glade and only after some hours could the Chileans retreat to Dalcahue and sail back to Chile.

== Sources ==
- LA Batalla de Mocopulli, Diario Austral de Llanquihue. 2003.
