= Tsesungún dialect =

Dialect of Huilliche

Tsesungún
- Native to: Chile
- Language family: Araucanian: Huiliche; Tsesungún

Language codes
- ISO 639-3: –
- Glottolog: tses1238

Tsesungún is a dialect of Huilliche, an Araucanian language spoken in Chile. Most of its speakers speak Spanish as their first language. It is closely related but barely intelligible to Mapudungun speakers.

It is classified as Araucanian/Huilliche/Tsesungun. It is used mostly in mountain valleys for ceremonial purposes.
