= Llancacura =

- Interactive map of Llancacura
- Coordinates: 40.3147947°S 73.4423998°W
- Region: Los Ríos
- Province: Ranco
- Municipality: La Unión
- Commune: La Unión

Government
  - Type: Municipal

Population (2002)
  - Total: 322
- 122 (eastern sector) and 200 (western sector)
- Time zone: UTC−04:00 (Chilean Standard)
  - Summer (DST): UTC−03:00 (Chilean Daylight)
- Area code: Country + town = 56 + 64

Llancacura is a hamlet (Spanish: caserío) located at northern shores of Bueno River west of city of La Unión in Ranco Province, southern Chile. It lies upstream of La Barra and downstream of Trumao. Forestry has long been the driving economic activity in the hamlet.
