= Mission of Río Bueno =

The Mission of Río Bueno (Spanish: Misión de Río Bueno) was a Franciscan mission in the Huilliche lands in Río Bueno, next to Bueno River, southern Chile.

The establishment of the mission was by 1767 being planned by the Jesuit Andrés Febrés. As the Jesuit order was expelled from Spanish America in 1767 the project was continued by Franciscans who established the mission in 1777.

In 1792 events related to the mission led to a Huilliche uprising that year. According to Diego Barros Arana "an Indian" called Felipe was said to have obtained a letter from the Governor of Valdivia to the head of the mission. This letter would have revealed that the purpose of the mission was to "lull the Indians in the confidence of peace, to give death to their warriors and reduce more easily the peoples into slavery". Albeit these claims are deemed false by Barros Arana in 1792, they were enough to ignite an uprising. The uprising begun in September 1792, with a series of assaults against Spanish settlers in Río Bueno and Lago Ranco. Houses were torched and animals stolen. Ten Spanish settlers are reported to have been killed. Friar Antonio Curcoa (or Cuzcoo) who ran the mission was "tied naked to the tail of a vigorous horse and dragged around in the countryside until he ceased to exist".

== See also ==
- List of Jesuit sites

== Bibliography ==
- Barros Arana, Diego (2000) [1886]. "Capítulo XVII". Historia General de Chile (in Spanish). Vol. VII (2 ed.). Santiago, Chile: Editorial Universitaria. ISBN 956-11-1535-2.
