= Huilliche uprising of 1792 =

Anti-Spanish indigenous uprising in Chile

Date	September 1792 – 14 January 1793
Location	Futahuillimapu, southern Chile
Result	Uprising suppressed Parliament of Las Canoas
Territorial changes	Huilliches recognise Spanish sovereignty over Futahuillimapu; Strip of land between Rahue and Damas rivers opened for Spanish colonization leading to the reestablishment of Osorno

Belligerents
(Spain) Spanish Empire	Mapuche-Huilliches of Futahuillimapu

Commanders and leaders
(Spain) Tomás de Figueroa	

The Huilliche uprising of 1792 was an indigenous uprising against the Spanish penetration into Futahuillimapu, a territory in southern Chile that had been de facto free of Spanish rule since 1602. The first part of the conflict was a series of Huilliche attacks on Spanish settlers and the mission in the frontier next to Bueno River. Following this a militia led by Tomás de Figueroa departed from Valdivia ravaging Huilliche territory in a quest to subdue anti-Spanish elements in Futahuillimapu.

== Background ==
The location of Spanish settlements (yellow dots) by 1792 within the modern boundaries of Chile. In red is the land of Cuncos and Huilliches where the Spanish aimed to build a road to connect Valdivia with the settlements to the south.

Beginning in the mid-18th century the Spanish enclave of Valdivia started a period of agricultural expansion. The expansion was mainly directed to the south and was done mostly by peaceful means, but hostilities with indigenous Huilliches did occur. In 1758 Huilliche chief Huarán requested Spanish soldiers to defend his lands against his Cunco enemies. The Governor of Valdivia Ambrosio Sáes de Bustamante responded to this call leading to the second Battle of Río Bueno in 1759. There are differing views on the outcome of this battle; according to Diego Barros Arana it was a Spanish victory, yet another view is that with battle chiefs Catrillanca and Paidil managed to halt any further Spanish advance. The battle was an exception to the otherwise peaceful penetration.

The expansion of Valdivia included a process of racial mixing, the purchasing of indigenous lands by people of European descent and the transformation of previous indigenous proprietors into bonded labourers. In contrast, the Spanish settlement at Chiloé Archipelago had a history of conflicts with the indigenous peoples to the north. After the Valdivian colonization had reached the Bueno River, the Spanish authorities pushed to connect the city of Valdivia and the settlements at Chacao Channel with a road. This way they hoped to make it possible for Valdivia and Chiloé to offer each other mutual aid in the case of invasion by a European power.

In the 1780s, when attempting to cooperate to build this road, the Governor of Valdivia Mariano Pusterla and the Intendant of Chiloé Francisco Hurtado del Pino disagreed. Hurtado del Pino preferred to confront the Huilliches militarily, while Pusterla rejected this approach. After Hurtado del Pino was removed from his position and replaced by Francisco Garos, cooperation ensued. In October 1788 Pusterla sent an expedition across Huilliche-ruled territory to reach Chiloé. The expedition was successful, and by February 1789 its men were back in Valdivia. After this Pusterla made arrangements to improve the road to Chiloé, in particularly to widen it at places where it was no more than a narrow track through forests. In a meeting the Spaniards held with local Cuncos and Huilliches, Pusterla gave assurances that the opening of the road would not imply a re-establishment of the city of Osorno. (Note: The city of Osorno had originally been founded by the Spanish in 1558 but was destroyed by Cuncos and Huilliches in 1602 during the destruction of the Seven Cities.) Subsequently, safe transit along the road came to depend on the goodwill of local tribes. (Note: A similar road known as Caicumeo was opened in 1788 in Chiloé Island connecting the Spanish settlements of Ancud and Castro.)

In parallel with the agricultural expansion and the drive to connect Valdivia and Chiloé Catholic missionary activity also advanced from Valdivia to the south. Spanish Jesuit Andrés Febrés supported the incorporation of Futahuillimapu into the Spanish Empire and by 1767 Febrés had developed plans to establish a mission in Río Bueno. This mission was however established in 1777 by Franciscans as the Jesuits had been expelled from the Americas in 1767.

== Uprising ==
According to Diego Barros Arana the catalyst of the uprising was a rumour spread by "an Indian" called Felipe who was said to have obtained a letter from the Governor of Valdivia directed to the head of the mission of Río Bueno. This letter would have revealed that the purpose of the mission was to "lull the Indians in the confidence of peace, give death to their warriors and thus reduce more easily the peoples into slavery."

The uprising begun in September 1792, with a series of assaults against Spanish settlers in Río Bueno and Lago Ranco. Houses were torched and animals stolen. Ten Spanish settlers are reported to have been killed. Spanish messengers and priests were caught off guard and brutally killed. Spanish refugees escaped north reaching Valdivia. Once authorities realised it was an uprising and not ordinary crime a detachment under the command of Tomás de Figueroa was sent south from Valdivia on 3 October, following the Futa River. The first step of the campaign was to Daglipulli where the militia of Figueroa was to absorb the 22 soldiers stationed to reach a total of 104 men.

When Figueroa reached the conflict zone the local Huilliches presented themselves as friends. Deeming this to be a tactic to avoid retribution Figueroa had local cacique Manquepán executed along his two sons and seventeen of his men. These men rejected baptism before their death. Subsequently, the Spanish took custody of women and children, while animals were confiscated. Next on the militia continued to cross the Bueno River. Thereafter it advanced slowly amidst heavy rains, obstacles put in their way and minor ambushes. Figueroa reached the ruins of Osorno on 22 November, the view of which made a strong impression on him. The campaign continued to ravage Huilliche territory in pursuit of rebel elements until it arrived back to Valdivia on 14 January 1793.

== Aftermath ==
After the Spanish had suppressed the uprising, Royal Governor of Chile Ambrosio O'Higgins summoned local chiefs to the Parliament of Las Canoas. The parliament is historically relevant since the treaty signed at the end of the meeting allowed the Spanish to reestablish the city of Osorno and secure the transit rights between Valdivia and the Spanish mainland settlements next to Chiloé Archipelago (Carelmapu). The indigenous signatories recognized the king of Spain as their sovereign but they kept considerable autonomy in the lands they had not ceded.

== Bibliography ==
- Barros Arana, Diego (2000) [1886]. "Capítulo XVII". Historia General de Chile (in Spanish). Vol. VII (2 ed.). Santiago, Chile: Editorial Universitaria. ISBN 956-11-1535-2.
- Rumian Cisterna, Salvador (2020-09-17). Gallito Catrilef: Colonialismo y defensa de la tierra en San Juan de la Costa a mediados del siglo XX (M.Sc. thesis) (in Spanish). University of Los Lagos.
- Urbina Carrasco, María Ximena (2009). La Frontera "de arriba" en Chile Colonial (in Spanish). Ediciones Universitarias de Valparaíso. ISBN 978-956-17-0433-6.
