= Trumao, Chile =

Trumao
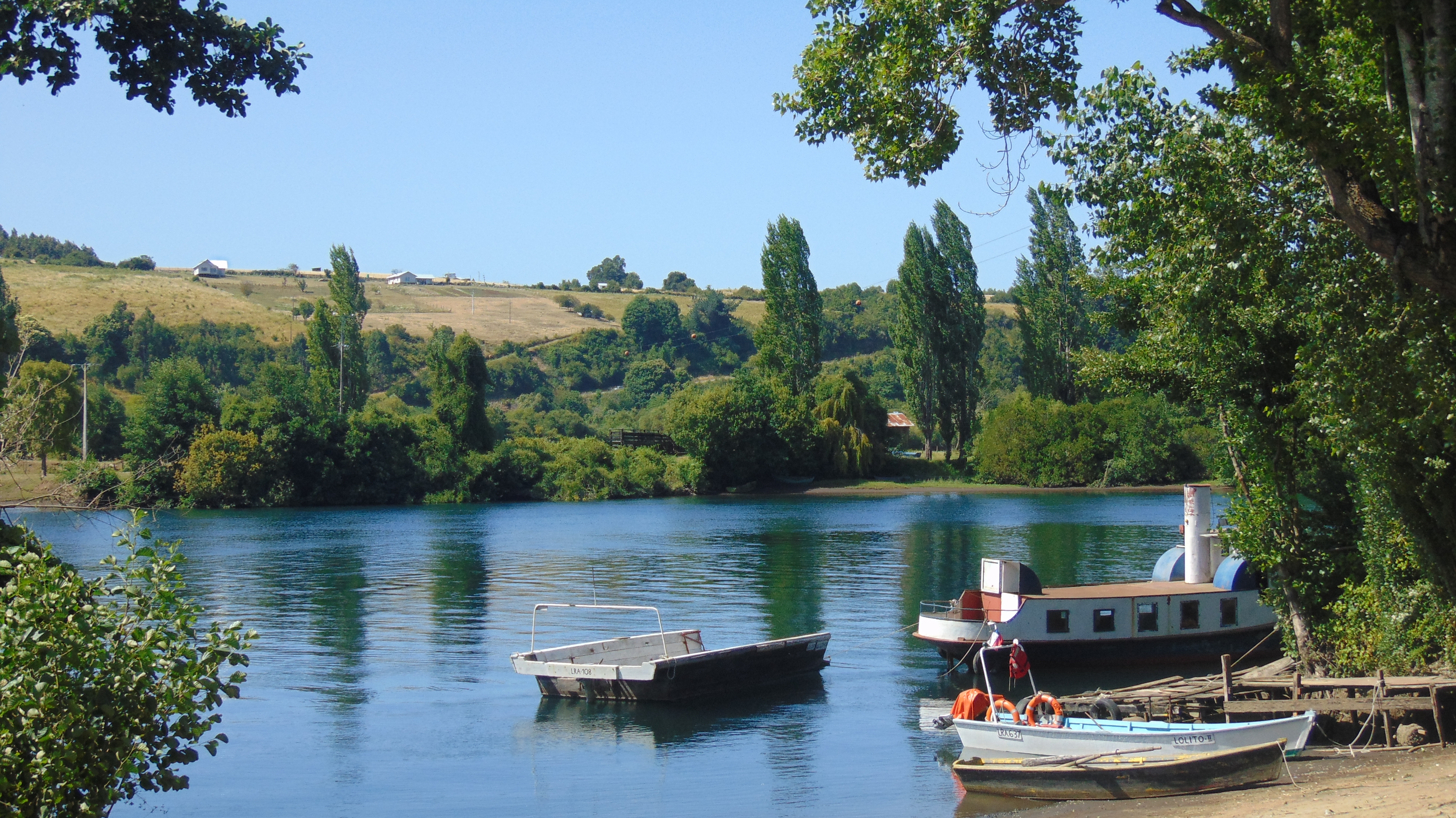
- View from southern Trumao towards northern Trumao across Bueno River. January 2020.
- Interactive map of Trumao
- Coordinates: 40°20′52″S 73°10′46″W
- Region: Los Ríos/Los Lagos
- Province: Ranco/Osorno
- Municipality: La Unión/San Pablo
- Commune: La Unión/San Pablo

Government
  - Type: Municipal
- Elevation: 7 m (23 ft)

Population (2017)
  - Total: 208 (La Unión commune)/48 (San Pablo commune)
- Time zone: UTC−04:00 (Chilean Standard)
  - Summer (DST): UTC−03:00 (Chilean Daylight)
- Area code: Country + town = 56 + 63
- Climate: Cfb

Trumao is the name of two hamlets (Spanish: caserío) in Chile each located in front of the other on the shores of Bueno River. The northern hamlet belong to the La Unión commune and the southern to San Pablo commune.

In 1820 Patriot Colonel Jorge Beauchef reached trumao with his troops. Beauchef noticed the local Mapuche-Huilliche attended church and had a command of Spanish enough to communicate. He was received in friendly terms and helped to cross the river by locals who also put at his disposal bullock carts. Beuchef reciprocated by giving the Mapuche-Huilliche liquor and indigo dye which he had brought with him for this end. After his crossing at Trumao the small patriot army continued south achieving a victory over the royalist at the Battle of El Toro.

Trumao on the north side of the river had by 1899 a public school, a church or mission and a telegraph. Diccionario Geográfico de la República de Chile (1899) mentions that houses "begun to gather in the place in 1854".
