= Andrés Febrés =

Andrés Febrés was 18th-century Spanish Jesuit active in Colonial Chile. He is best known for his book Arte de la lengua general del Reyno de Chile, con un diálogo chileno-hispano muy curioso : a que se añade la doctrina christiana, esto es, rezo, catecismo, coplas, confesionario, y pláticas, lo más en lengua chilena y castellana : y por fin un vocabulario hispano-chileno, y un calepino chileno-hispano mas copioso (in Spanish). Lima. 1765. p. 465.

In his writings he supported the incorporation of the lands of the independent Cunco and Huilliche, the Futahuillimapu, into the Spanish Empire. In 1767 Febrés made plans to establish a mission in Río Bueno south of Valdivia. This mission was however established in 1777 by Franciscans as the Jesuits had been expelled from the Americas in 1767.
