= Araucanian languages =

Language family of South America

Araucanian
- Geographic distribution: Andes of Chile, Argentina
- Linguistic classification: One of the world's primary language families
- Subdivisions: Mapudungun; Huilliche

Language codes
- Glottolog: arau1255

The Araucanian languages (/ˌærɔːˈkeɪniən/ ARR-aw-KAY-nee-ən) are a small language family of indigenous languages of the Americas spoken in central Chile and neighboring areas of Argentina. The living representatives of this family are Mapudungun (ISO 639-3: arn) and Huilliche (ISO 639-3: huh), spoken respectively by the Mapuche and Huilliche people. These are usually considered divergent dialects of a single language isolate.

== Demographics ==
It is estimated that there are approximately 200,000 Mapudungun speakers in Chile and 40,000 speakers in Argentina. Huilliche is the native language of a few thousand Chileans.

== Language contact ==
Jolkesky (2016) notes that there are lexical similarities with the Kunza, Mochika, Uru-Chipaya, Arawak, Pano, Cholon-Hibito, and Kechua language families due to contact.

== Internal classification ==
=== Mason (1950) ===
Internal classification of Araucanian languages by Mason (1950):

- Araucanian
  - North
    - Picunche
    - Mapuche
    - Pewenche
      - Rankel(che)
    - Moluche
  - South
    - Wiliche (Huilliche)
      - Wiliche
        - Serrano
        - Pichi-Wiliche
      - Manzanero
    - Veliche (Chilote)
    - Chikiyami (Cuncho)
    - Leuvuche
  - East
    - Taluhet (Taluche)
    - Divihet (Diviche)

=== Jolkesky (2016) ===
Internal classification by Jolkesky (2016):

(† = extinct)

- Mapudungun
  - Mapudungun, Nuclear
    - Mapudungun
    - Pewenche
    - Rankelche
  - Mapudungun, Southern: Williche
  - Mapudungun, Northern
    - Pikunche †
    - Chango †

== Vocabulary ==
Loukotka (1968) lists the following basic vocabulary items for Mapuche (Araucanian) language varieties.

gloss	Mapuche	Picunche	Pehuenche	Huiliche	Chilote	Ranquelche
one	kiñe	kiñe	kiñe	kiñe	kenge	kiñe
two	epu	epue	epu	epu	epo	epú
three	küla	kela	kela	kila	köla	kʔla
head	longko		lonko	rlonko		lonkó
hand	kũ	kúü	kuü	ghechu		keñeu
water	ko	ko	ko	ko	ku	go
sun	antu	antü	ante	ante	ánte	ant'ü
moon	kuyen	küyén	küyen	kiyen	kién	kiyet
maize	voe	wa	wa	waká		wa
bird	gunún	üñem	küñüm	giñum		trarú
dog	thehua	thewa	thewa	trehua		cheuá
jaguar	nahuel	nahuel	nawel	nahuel		naue
