= British Cemetery, Callao =

Cemetery in Peru

Coordinates: 12.057°S 77.121°W

The British Cemetery of Callao Peru is a cemetery used exclusively for burials of members of the British community in Peru. It has since been used for other expatriate nationalities.

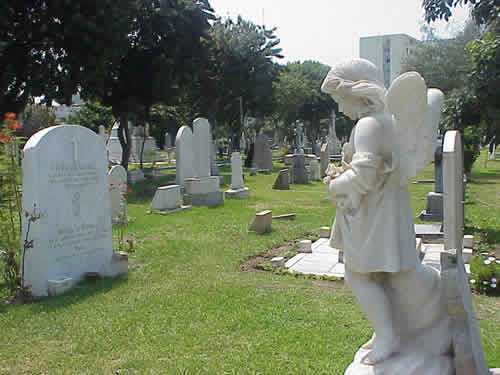
Cemetery tombstone sculpture

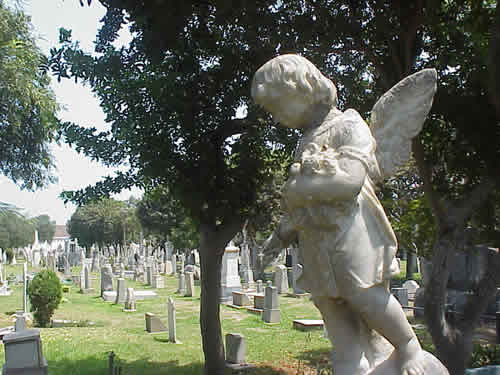
Cemetery Details

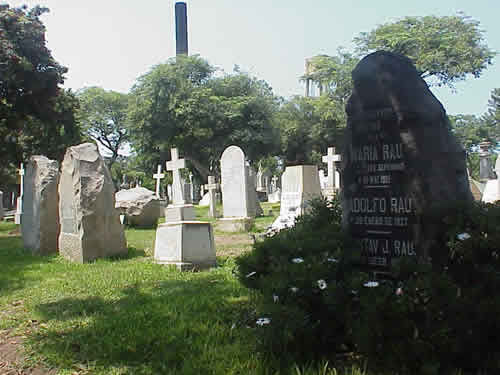
View of the British Cemetery

== History ==
The British Cemetery began its activities in 1834, when the British Consul in Lima and Callao obtained a supreme decree from the Peruvian Government granting him the right to purchase a plot of land for the construction of a cemetery exclusively for burials of members of the British Colony.

For the proper management of this cemetery, in 1835 the Government of King George IV sent money through a British Parliament Act (Art. 6, Chapter 85, Paragraph 14), under the supervision of the British Consul in Peru. This marked the beginning of the British Cemetery Association, which has since then been protected by its statutes.

To corroborate the above, the Peruvian Government issued a supporting regulation under a Decree dated 5 May 1836, authorizing the burial of members of the British Colony.

After more than 160 years, the British continue to be responsible for the Burial Ground Society (now the British Cemetery Association), with two British Cemeteries - the Old Cemetery in Bellavista - Callao and the New Cemetery in Av. Colonial, also in Callao, named that way for strictly chronological reasons.

== Present day ==
Among the tombs at the Old British Cemetery in Bellavista, one can find the names of people of many other nationalities: Germans, Polish, Swedish, Danish, Hungarians, Czechoslovaks, Yugoslavs, Russians, Swiss, Chinese, Japanese, Americans and many others, as well as an endless variety of religions. People of these and other nationalities participated in the development of Peru after the war of independence from Spain in 1821.

The first person to be buried there was the youngest son of General Sir Gordon Drummond G.C.B., Lieutenant William Russell Drummond, who died when his leg was amputated on 1 January 1835 after being shot in an ambush while on duty.

One of the men who fought for Peru's independence was the English General (subsequently named Peruvian Marshall) William Miller, who was originally buried in the British Cemetery in Bellavista upon his death on 31 October 1862, at 65 years of age. His remains were transferred to the " Official Pantheon of Heroes" on 16 October 1926, under the mandate of President Don Augusto B. Leguia, a great anglophile.

However, not only illustrious people are buried in Bellavista. General Miller's favourite cook, a black man named William Hanam born in Kingston, Jamaica, died at the age of 60 from edema and was the 17th person to be buried in the Old British Cemetery.

Several foreigners who died in the Battle of Angamos during the Pacific War between Chile and Peru were also buried there; others who survived the battle were later also laid to rest in the Bellavista Cemetery, including Samuel MacMahon, the first engineer of the Peruvian Monitor Huascar, who witnessed and survived the Battle of Angamos. During the same war, Bernard Fleming, a 17-year-old who was born in Lima of British parents, died in the Battle of Miraflores on 15 June 1881. His colleagues laid his body to rest in the British Cemetery. There are many other anecdotes like these.

The cemetery contains five Commonwealth War Graves of British naval personnel, three from World War I and two from World War II.

Thanks to the documents kept in the Cemetery, we have a record of diseases and plagues of medical interest, such as the Yellow Fever plague in Lima in April 1868, when more than 200 Germans died within only a couple of months, without counting the British and Peruvian casualties of this disease. Another incident recorded was the Smallpox plague in 1879, a disease that has been very rare on these coasts since the discovery of the smallpox vaccine.

Many members of the British and American colonies who helped develop the cemetery are also buried there, such as: William Pitt Adams, Business Manager and a prominent and well-known member of the British Delegation in Peru and one of the promoters of the Cemetery.

Also buried there are the remains of the son of the former secretary of the American Treasury, the honourable A. Adams, Captain Alexander Dallas, Commander of the American Squadron in the Pacific.

Europeans and their descendants include families like the Backus family, founders of the breweries, as well as descendants of the famous railway entrepreneur Mr. Enrique Meiggs who built the Southern Railway (Mollendo - Arequipa) during the Balta Government and, subsequently, the Central Railway. It is also the resting place of Scottish engineers who arrived to build the railway to La Oroya and died of the dreaded malaria. Crew members, officers and employees of the Pacific Steam Navigation Company, which ran a fleet of ships that sailed between our coasts and Europe, are buried there as well.
