= Battle of Agüi =

1820 battle on Chiloé Island

Coordinates: 41°49′46.48″S 73°51′18.26″W

- Part of the Chilean War of Independence
Date	February 18, 1820
Location	Fort Agüi north of Ancud on Chiloé Island
Result	Royalist victory

Belligerents
Chilean patriots	(Spain) Royalists

Commanders and leaders
William Miller	(Spain) Antonio Quintanilla

Strength
60	

Casualties and losses
20 killed	

The Battle of Agüi was fought at Fuerte de Agüi, near Ancud, Chiloé on February 18, 1820 between Chilean patriots and Spanish royalists, during the Chilean War of Independence. After the successful capture of Valdivia Lord Cochrane sought to occupy the Chiloé Archipelago which was the last stronghold of the Spanish in Chile. William Miller disembarked for this task but had to reembark after had been severely wounded in his leg and lost 20 men.

== The battle ==
The battle was part of an effort to drive Spanish forces from the Chiloé archipelago, some of which were fortified in the San Miguel de Agüi Castle. When Commander Saturino García arrived at the castle to reinforce the Spanish army, he found that Chilean Major William Miller had already begun combat. The patriots felt the urgency of this arrival and a force of 60 men assaulted the fort but 38 men, including Miller, were disabled by shot from within.

Assuming command, Captain Francisco Eréscano formed a new column, but canon and gun fire from within the castle made it difficult to advance towards it over a narrow, broken road. The patriots found their situation made more difficult when a gunboat dispatched from San Carlos by colonial governor Antonio Quintanilla arrived and began firing on their flank.

The patriot column was forced to fall back. Captain Eréscano carried it out in an orderly fashion, evacuating the wounded and assuring that the rear of his column would be protected from the garrison inside the castle, now being reinforced by Captain García’s troops. Nevertheless, Eréscano’s forces still had to repel three attacks from the Spanish. The Chilean forces marched down Huechucucuy Beach and arrived at the cove were their ships were anchored. By this point the Spanish had ceased their pursuit of the patriot force, probably out of a fear of being surrounded by a larger force.
