= Barra del Río Bueno =

- Interactive map of Barra del Río Bueno
- Coordinates: 40°14′48″S 73°42′27″W
- Region: Los Lagos
- Province: Osorno
- Municipality: San Juan de la Costa
- Commune: San Juan de la Costa

Government
  - Type: Municipal
  - Alcade: Bernardo Candia Henríquez (DC)
- Elevation: 5 m (16 ft)

Population (2002)
  - Total: 48
- Time zone: UTC−04:00 (Chilean Standard)
  - Summer (DST): UTC−03:00 (Chilean Daylight)
- Area code: Country + town = 56 + 64

Barra del Río Bueno or La Barra is a hamlet (Spanish: caserío) located at coast of Osorno Province, southern Chile. The hamlet lies at the outflow of Bueno River into the Pacific Ocean.
