= Our Lady of the Rosary Cathedral, Valdivia =

Coordinates: 39.8140°S 73.2465°W

Our Lady of the Rosary Cathedral
- Catedral de Nuestra Señora del Rosario
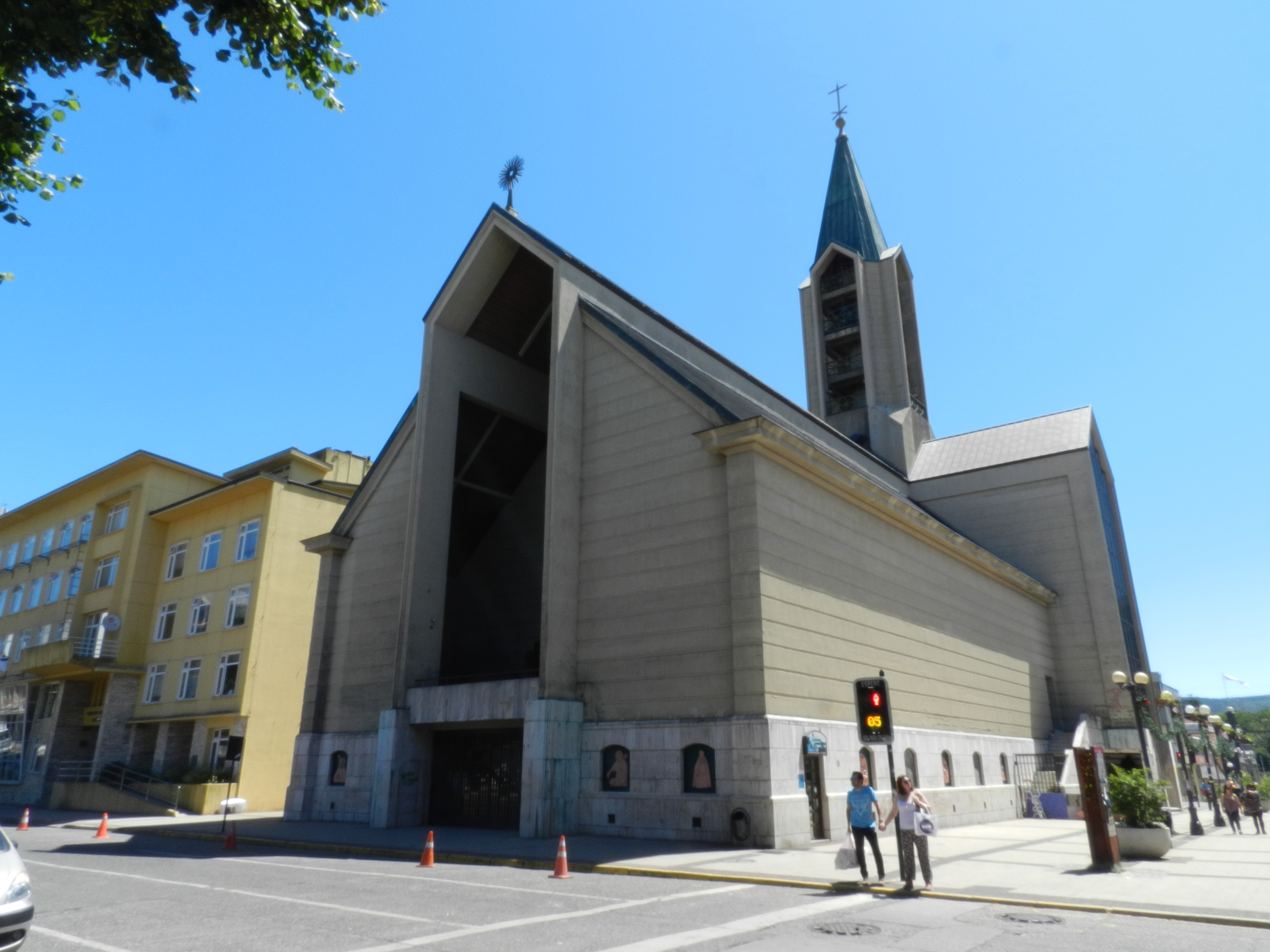
- Our Lady of the Rosary Cathedral
- Location: Valdivia
- Country: Chile
- Denomination: Roman Catholic Church

The Our Lady of the Rosary Cathedral (Spanish: Catedral de Nuestra Señora del Rosario) Also Valdivia Cathedral Is the main Catholic church of the Valdivia diocese, built in the center of the homonymous city of Valdivia, in the South American country of Chile.

The Cathedral of Valdivia is located on one side of the Republic Square (Plaza de la República), in the center of the city. The building of the cathedral currently houses, on its second floor, the Cathedral Temple; In its first floor, a chapel where the Eucharist is celebrated, the Crypt of the Bishops, a wake and the offices and dependencies of the Parish of Our Lady of the Rosary; And in the zócalo, a Museum that conserves different religious objects.

The cathedral is erected in the place where the main Catholic temples of the city have been located, being the thirteenth main Church that has had the city of Valdivia. The different cataclysms that the city has suffered many times destroyed its main temple. The earthquake of 1960 completely destroyed the previous cathedral, built in 1911; The current building dates from 1988.

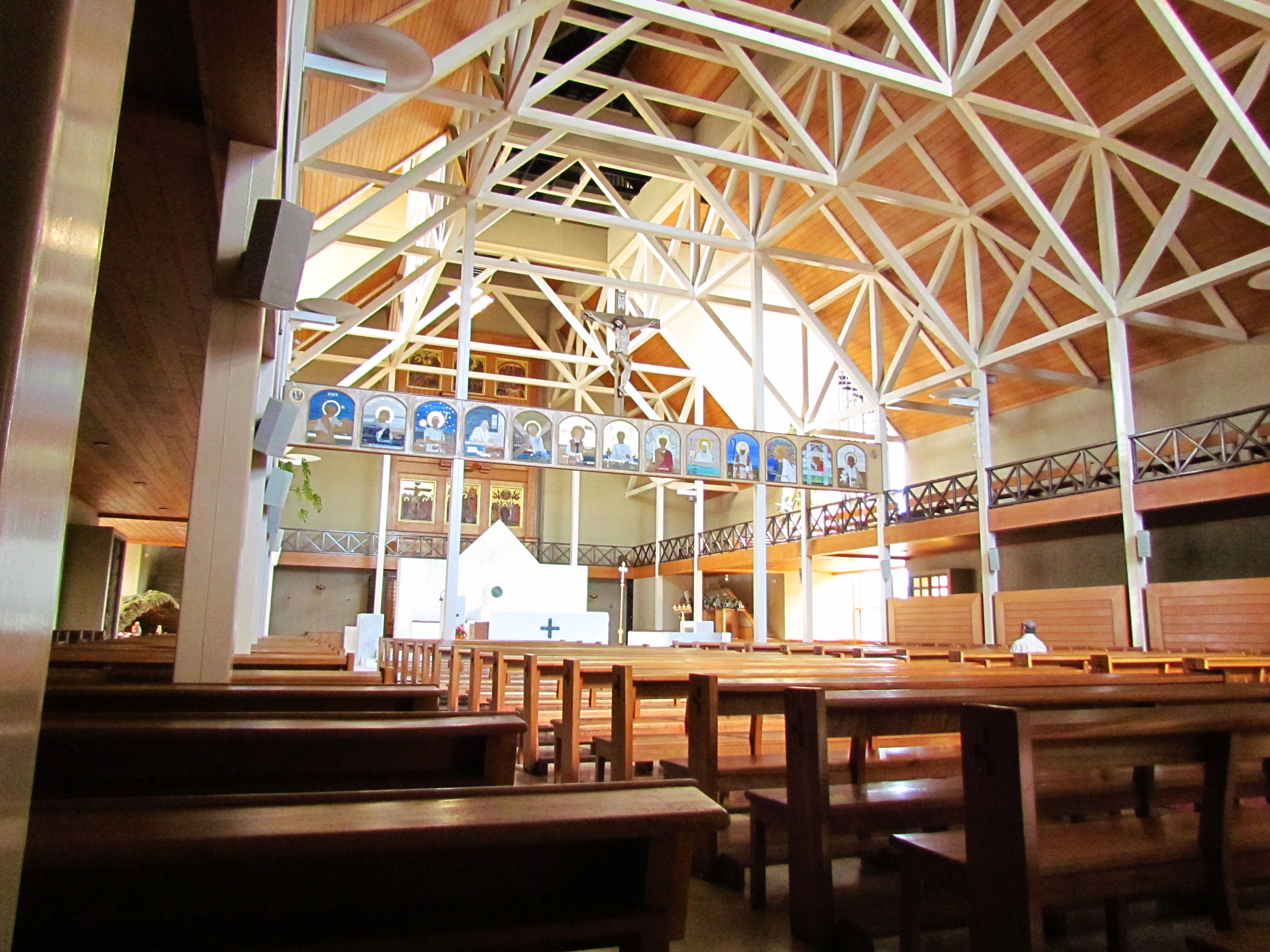
Internal view

== See also ==
- Roman Catholicism in Chile
- Our Lady of the Rosary
