= Huilliche language =

Araucanian language of Chile

Huilliche
- chesungun, chedungun
- Native to: Chile
- Region: Los Lagos, Los Ríos
- Ethnicity: Huilliche people
- Native speakers: A few elderly speakers (2012)
- Language family: Araucanian: Huilliche
- Dialects: Huillichesungun; Tsesungún

Language codes
- ISO 639-3: huh
- Glottolog: huil1244
- ELP: Huilliche
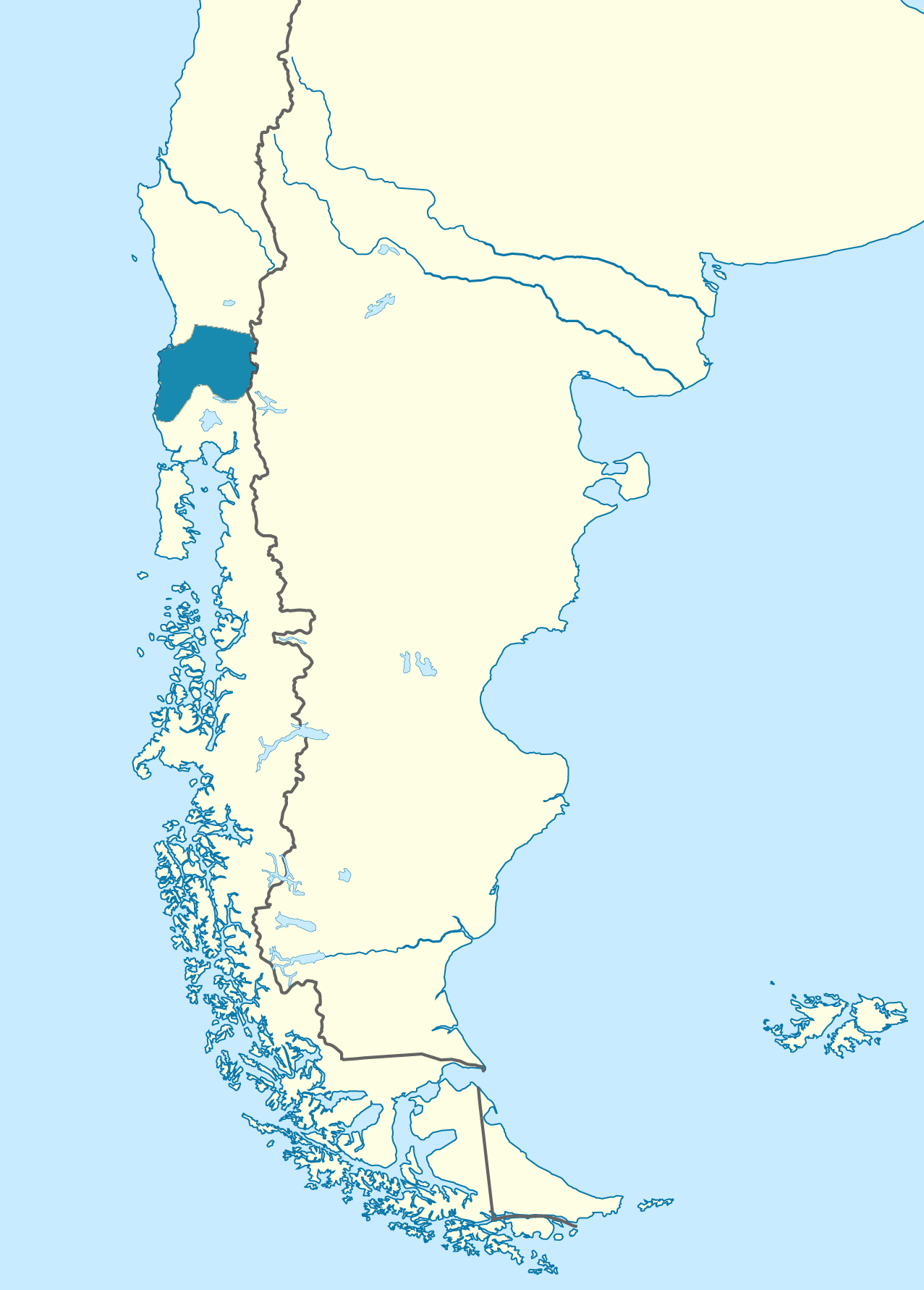

willi "south"
- People: Huilliche
- Language: Chedungun
- Country: Futahuillimapu

Huilliche (which can also be found spelt Williche, Huiliche or Veliche) is a moribund branch of the Araucanian language family. In 1982 it was spoken by about 2,000 ethnic Huilliche people in Chile, but in 2012 it was spoken by only a few elderly speakers. It is spoken in the nation's Los Lagos and Los Ríos regions; and mountain valleys, between the city of Valdivia and south toward the Chiloé Archipelago.

== Dialects ==
Dialect sub-groups

- - - - - I
        - II
    - - - III
        - IV
      - - V
        - VI
        - VII
  - Huilliche

Cladogram showing the closeness of Huilliche with Mapuche dialects (I–VII) based on shared features according to Robert A. Croese. Dialect sub-groups are roughly ordered from their geographical distribution from north to south.

Huilliche is composed of at least two varieties, called Huillichesungun and Tsesungún by their speakers. Huillichesungun is spoken in Wequetrumao, on the island of Chiloé, and Tsesungun is spoken in Choroy Traiguen, on the coast of Osorno province. Huilliche is closely related to Mapudungun, the language of the Mapuche, though more research is needed to determine the degree of mutual intelligibility between the two.

The "Enduring Voices" project of National Geographic reports the following:

They are to some degree hidden within the broader Mapuche ethnic group, yet consider themselves quite distinct in both language and identity [...] Though the two languages [Huillichesungun and Tsesungun] may share as many as 80% of basic words, we confirmed that they differ in their sounds and grammar, as well as in their ethno-linguistic identity [...] Unexpectedly, Tsesungun, though it is geographically closer to Mapudungun, is less similar to it."

The Jesuit priest Luis de Valdivia reported in 1606 that there was linguistic unity in the territory between Coquimbo and Chiloé, from the Pacific to the Andes, and that this was composed of varieties whose differences were mostly in pronunciation and vocabulary. This analysis is supported by researchers at the end of the 19th and beginning of the 20th century, such as Félix José de Augusta or Rodolfo Lenz, and by those in the second half of the 20th century, such as Robert Croese. The latter two noted that Huilliche was the most divergent of the varieties of Araucanian, as did Pilar Álvarez-Santullano, a researcher in the phonology and syntax of Chesungun on the Osorno coast. A 2015 study found that the degree of mutual intelligibility was not possible to evaluate at present given that speakers of Huilliche were too few and with scant linguistic competence, nevertheless with the evidence available authors regarded Huilliche a variety of Mapudungun.

Most Huilliche speakers are older adults, and most ethnic Huilliche speak Spanish as their first language, making both Huilliche varieties highly endangered.

== Phonology ==
The phonemic inventory of the Lafkenche dialect is given below.

Consonants
	Labial	Dental	Alveolar	Palatal/ Postalveolar	Retroflex	Velar
Plosive/ Affricate	p	t̪	t	t͡ʃ	ʈʂ	k
Fricative	f	θ	s	ʃ	ʐ	ɣ
Nasal	m	n̪	n	ɲ		ŋ
Lateral		l̪	l	ʎ		
Semivowel	w			j		

Vowels
	Front	Central	Back
High	/i/ [ɪ]	/ɨ/ [ɘ]	/u/ [ʊ]
Mid	/e/ [ə]		/o/ [ɔ]
Low		/a/ [ɐ̝]	

== See also ==
- Chilote Spanish
- Languages of Chile
