= Guillermo Miller =

William Miller
- William Miller
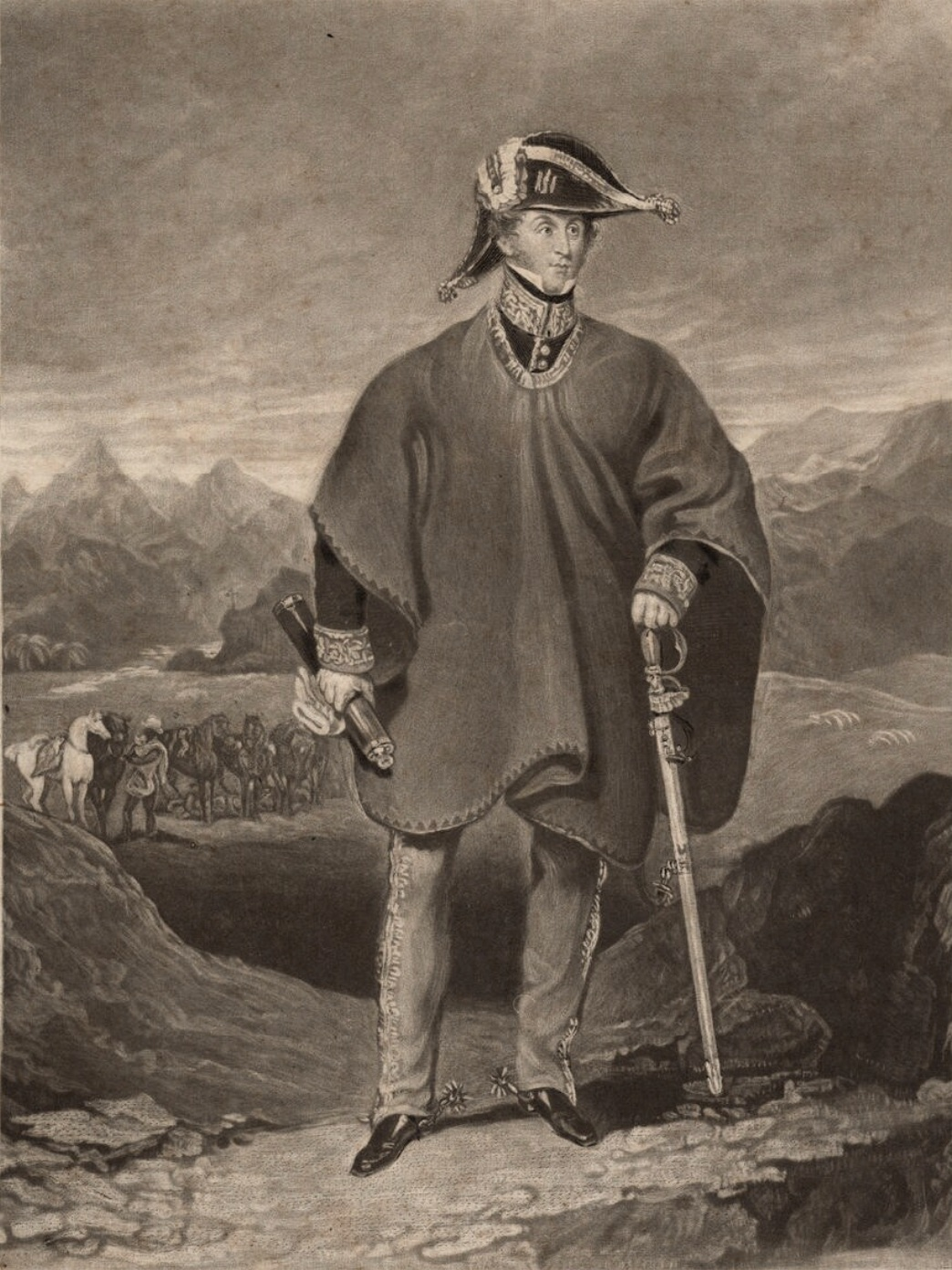
- Portrait by Charles Turner, 1829
- Born: 2 December 1795; Wingham, Kent
- Died: 31 October 1861 (aged 65); Lima, Peru
- Military career
- Allegiance: United Kingdom; Chile; Peru
- Rank: Grand Marshal of Peru
- Conflicts: Peninsular War; Siege of Badajoz (1812); Battle of Vitoria; War of 1812; Chilean War of Independence; Second Battle of Cancha Rayada; Battle of Maipú; Capture of Valdivia; Battle of Agüi; Peruvian War of Independence; Battle of Torata; Battle of Junín; Battle of Ayacucho

William Miller (2 December 1795 – 31 October 1861), known as Guillermo Miller in the Spanish-speaking world, was a British-born army officer and diplomat who served in the Peninsular War and the Spanish American wars of independence.

== Biography ==
Born December 2, 1795 in Wingham, Kent, Miller was fluent in several languages by the age of seventeen, when he enrolled in the British army to fight in the Napoleonic Wars, taking part in the Siege of Badajoz and Battle of Vittoria under the Duke of Wellington. In September 1817, hearing of the wars in Latin America, he set sail for Buenos Aires to join San Martín's Army of the Andes. He took part in San Martín's liberation of Chile, participating in the decisive battle of Maipú, and then joined Lord Cochrane as the commander of marines in the Chilean Navy. He participated in the Cochrane's Capture of Valdivia leading a force 60 soldiers. After this he participated in the failed expedition to Chiloé and lost the little but significant Battle of Agüi.

=== Peru ===
After the liberation of Lima, Peru he was appointed commander of the Peruvian Legion. General Miller – while suffering from malaria – played a big part in the Battle of Torata: storming the hills and taking them when everything seemed to be lost. Peru President José de la Riva Agüero promoted Miller to General of Brigade and, when Simón Bolívar arrived, he was promoted to Chief of a cavalry unit that included Argentines and Chileans who had arrived with San Martín, in addition to many Peruvians and Colombians.

At the Battle of Junín his cavalry was largely responsible for the defeat of the Spanish and at the Battle of Ayacucho his initiative in launching an attack at a critical moment, without waiting for Sucre's orders, was decisive in securing victory. During these wars Miller was wounded twenty two times, and after his death the autopsy revealed he had carried two bullets in his liver for 40 years.

He created the Hussars of the Peruvian Legion who, after turning the course of the Battle of Junín in favour of the revolutionaries, were renamed the "Hussars of Junín". These same Hussars remain in charge of the guard at the Peruvian Palace of Government in Lima.

After the war was over, Miller settled in Lima. On June 11, 1834, in appreciation for services rendered to the existing government, General Miller received promotion to the rank of grand marshal, the highest military grade in Peru. He held various public offices, but argued with the governments after 1836, mainly about their treatment of the Indians. As a result, on March 25, 1839, he was stripped of his rank as Grand Marshal of Peru. While he was later reinstated in all his ranks and privileges, Miller never again held active political or military command in Peru. His brother John wrote a two-volume biography in 1828.

=== Hawaii ===
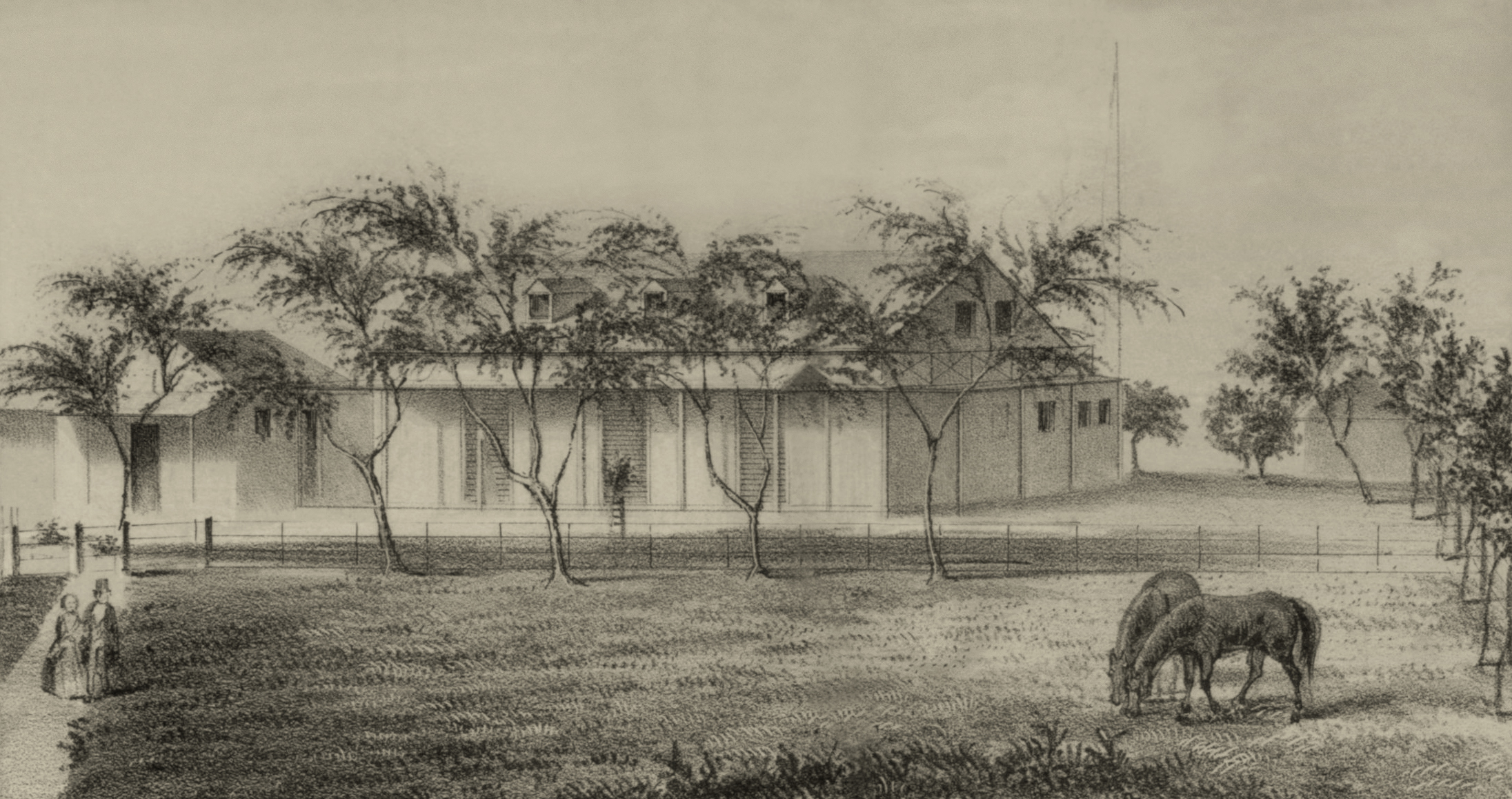
Residence of the British Consul in Honolulu, 1853

Miller became British diplomatic Consul to Pacific islands such as the Kingdom of Hawaii in 1843 after Richard Charlton. He arrived in Honolulu in January 1844 with his Scottish friend Robert Crichton Wyllie. Wyllie acted as assistant in Hawaii while Miller traveled to the rest of the Pacific islands from July 1844 to March 15, 1845. Wyllie would then become Minister of Foreign Affairs for the Kingdom of Hawaii.

In 1859 Busvargus Toup Nicolas (1819–1859), son of Admiral John Toup Nicolas (1788–1851), temporarily replaced Miller as consul.

=== Return to Peru ===
On Nicolas' return because of ill health, English merchant William Lowthian Green acted as consul until William W. F. Synge (1826–1891), could finally be sent as a permanent official replacement. Miller died in Callao October 31, 1861, aged 65, and was initially buried in the Old British Cemetery, Bellavista. In the 1920s, his body was transferred to the Panteon de los Proceres, the final resting place for the heroes of the War of Independence.

There is a house in Markham College named after him.

There is a street in Wingham, England named after him. A plaque, presented by the Peruvian government in 2006, is inside St. Mary's Church.

Diplomatic posts
Preceded by Richard Charlton	U.K. Consul to Kingdom of Hawaii; 1844–1859	Succeeded by William W. F. Synge
