= Tomás de Figueroa =

Spanish Army officer (1747–1811)

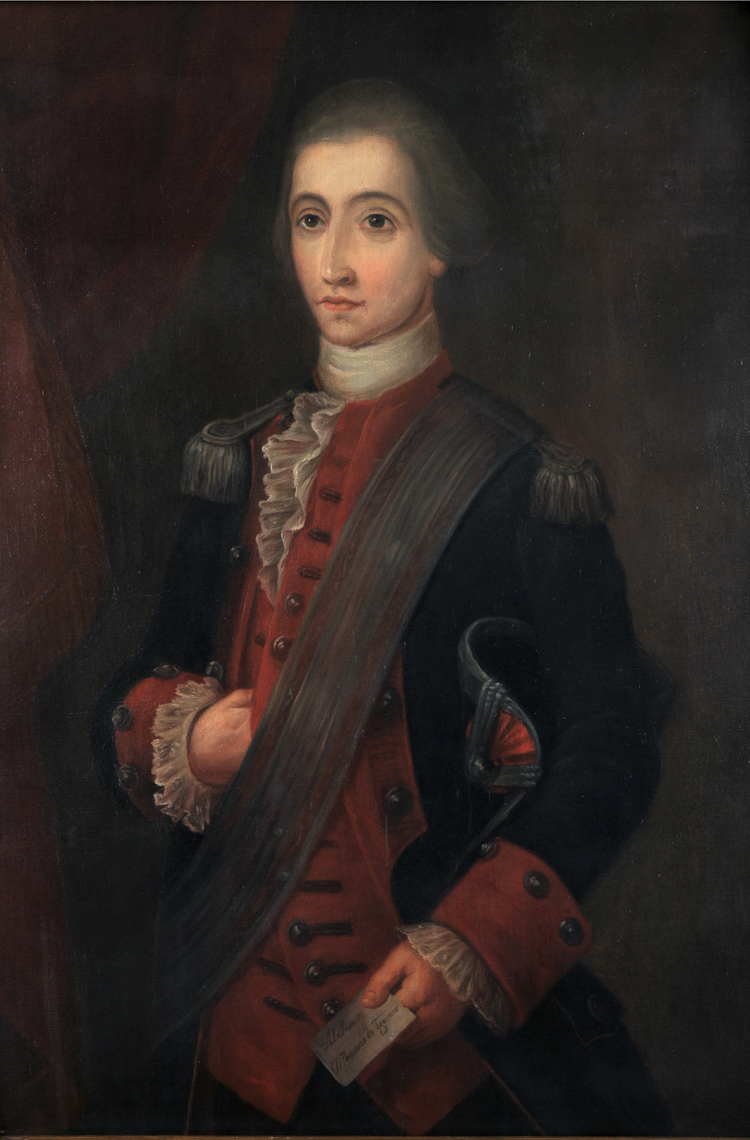
- Born: 1747; Estepona, Spain
- Died: 1 April 1811 (aged 63–64) Santiago, Captaincy General of Chile
- Allegiance: Spain
- Conflicts: Huilliche uprising of 1792; Figueroa mutiny (executed)

Tomás de Figueroa y Caravaca (c. 1747 – 1 April 1811) was a Spanish Army officer. He was active in the military outpost of Valdivia and later in Santiago as a royalist during the early phase of the Chilean struggle for independence. He was born in Estepona, near Málaga in southern Spain. A soldier by profession, he had to migrate Chile in 1775 after having killed a man in a duel in Spain. In late 1792 he led Spanish forces that suppressed a Huilliche uprising around Río Bueno and Futahuillimapu in southern Chile. After leading a mutiny to restore colonial order in Santiago on 1 April 1811, he was summarily executed on the orders of pro-independence leader Juan Martínez de Rozas.
