= Jorge Beauchef =

- George Beauchef
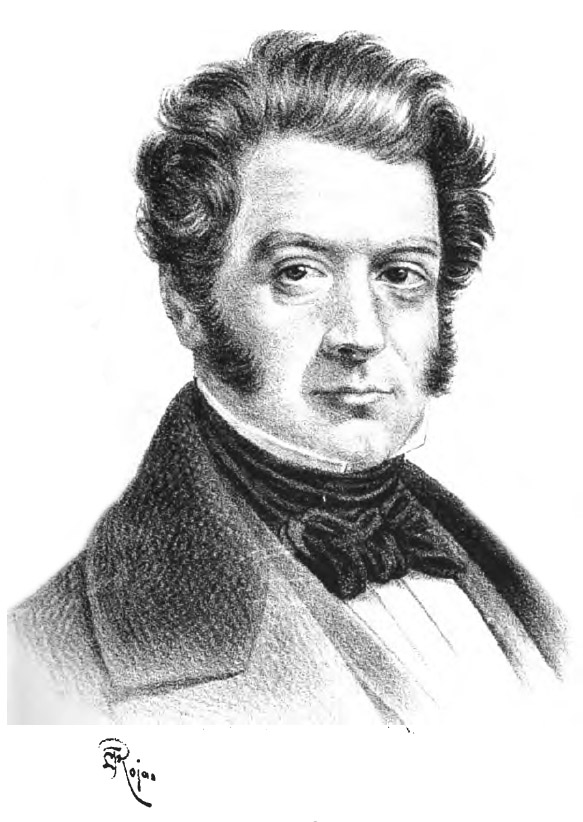
- Born: 1787; Le Puy-en-Velay, France
- Died: June 10, 1840 (aged 52-53); Santiago, Chile
- Spouse: Teresa Manso
- Military career
- Allegiance: (France) French Empire; Republic of Chile
- Conflicts: War of the Third Coalition; Battle of Ulm; Battle of Austerlitz; War of the Fourth Coalition; Battle of Jena–Auerstedt; Battle of Mohrungen; Battle of Friedland; Peninsular War; Chilean War of Independence; Second Battle of Cancha Rayada; Battle of Maipú; Capture of Valdivia; Battle of El Toro; Battle of Mocopulli; Battle of Pudeto; Peruvian War of Independence

Jorge Beauchef (1787 in Le Puy-en-Velay, France – June 10, 1840 in Santiago, Chile) was a French military officer who participated in the Napoleonic Wars. He is best known in Latin America for his participation in the Chilean War of Independence, where he won many battles (Battle of Maipú, capture of Valdivia etc). This first battle, one of the most famous, ensured Chile's independence, putting an end to the continuous Spanish domination since 1536.

A pioneer of the Chilean Navy, he distinguished himself under the orders of the famous British mercenary Lord Cochrane. He won the battle of Valdivia with him, for which they were both decorated. He was governor of Lima (to a lesser extent, he participated in the Peruvian War of Independence by commanding an expedition to help José de San Martín, a national hero of Argentina and Peru).

In his honour, a street in downtown Santiago has been renamed "Beauchef Street". The main buildings of the Faculty of Physical and Mathematical Sciences of the University of Chile are located there and are called "Campus Beauchef". A series entitled "La huella de Beauchef" (in English: "The Beauchef footprint") of 6 one-hour episodes was released about him in 2006. His war memoirs have been reprinted several times in the 20th and 21st centuries, mainly in Spanish and English but also in French.

== Napoleonic Wars ==
At the age of nineteen, he participated with the French forces in the Battle of Austerlitz against the Third Coalition. In 1808, as part of Napoleon's forces that invaded Spain, he was taken prisoner but managed to escape. After the defeat at Waterloo in 1815, Beauchef was discharged for refusing to take the oath to the Bourbon monarchy, leaving for New York.

== Activity in South America ==
While in the United States, he was invited to join South American patriots in the Army of the Andes. However, he did not manage to arrive in time for the army's crossing of the Andes into Chile and the decisive battle of Chacabuco. When he arrived he soon begun to participate in engagement with the royalist; first in the siege of Talcahuano (1817) and later on in the decisive patriot victory at the Battle of Maipú (1818).

In 1819 he joined the newly formed Chilean Navy under the command of Lord Cochrane. In February 1820 he led an amphibious assault on the heavily fortified Corral Bay leading to the capture of Valdivia. He stayed in Valdivia to chase remaining royalists while Cochrane sailed further south to Chiloé Island. Beauchef then left Valdivia to expel the royalists from Osorno. The royalist forces of Valdivia had fled to Osorno and then gathered at Carelmapu fort where they received orders from Antonio de Quintanilla to confront Beauchef. In the Battle of El Toro (1820) Beauchef succeeded in defeating the royalist expedition.

In 1823 he was sent in charge of a reinforcement to José de San Martín's army in Peru. There he served as governor of Lima for a short time. Back in Chile he participated in the 1824 expedition to Chiloé Island where he was defeated in the Battle of Mocopulli. Chiloé would only be incorporated into Chile after Ramón Freire's 1826 expedition.

== Later years ==
In 1828 Beauchef left the army and three years later, in 1831 he went on visit to France where he remained two years before returning to Chile. He died in Santiago on June 10 of 1840.

== Legacy ==
In 1970, a statue was erected in his honour in Valdivia, following his greatest victory, the capture of Valdivia in 1820.
