= Ximena Urbina =

Chilean historian

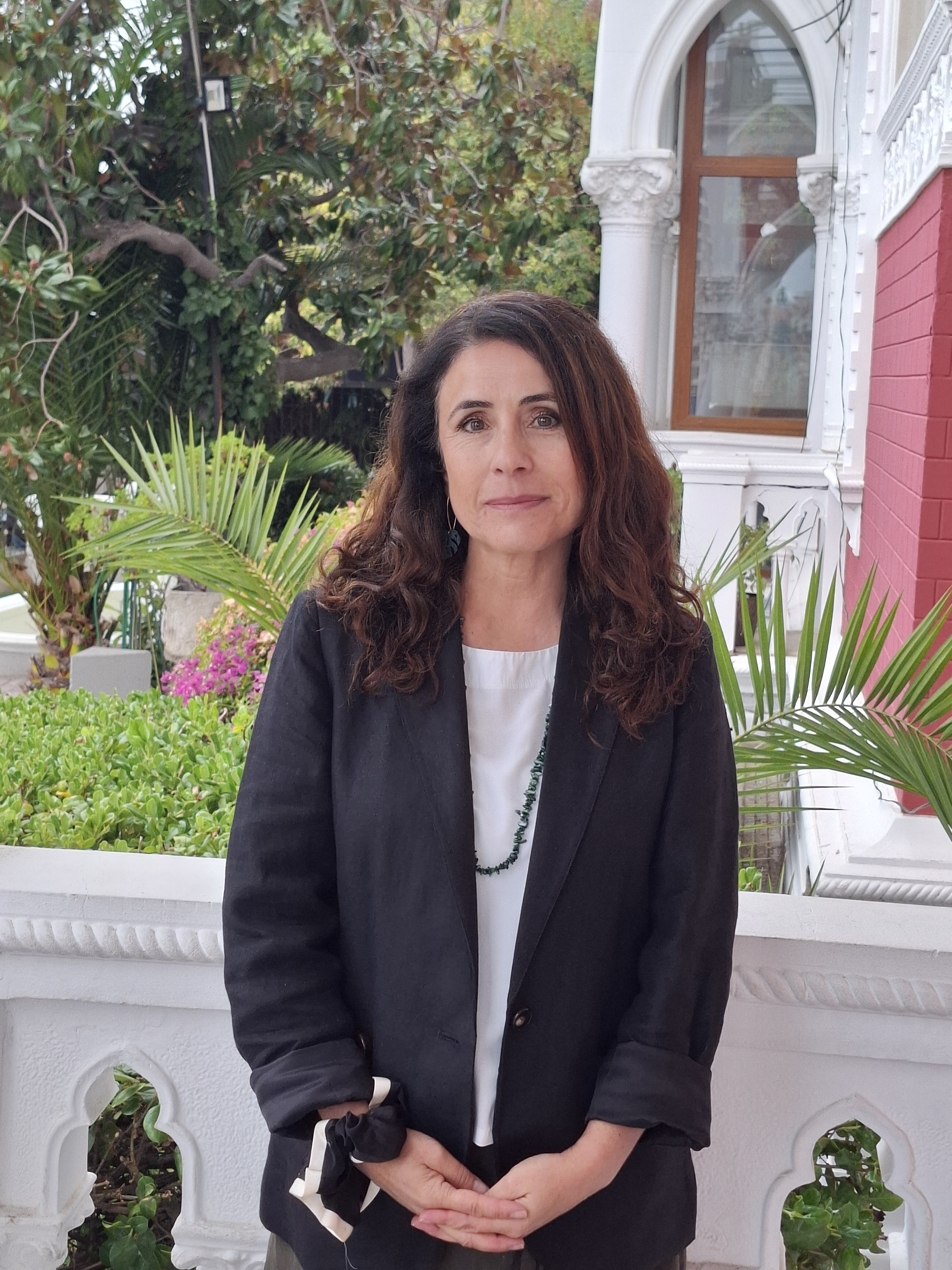
- Born: Valparaíso, Chile
- Occupation: Historian
- Years active: 1990s–present
- Known for: Colonial history of fjords and channels of Patagonia
- Awards: Premio Miguel Cruchaga Tocornal (2003); Premio de Historia Colonial Silvio Zavala (2009)

Academic background
- Education: Pontifical Catholic University of Valparaíso (Bachelor of Arts) (Master's Degree); University of Seville (Ph.D.)
- Influences: Héctor Herrera Cajas • Rodolfo Urbina • Francisco Morales Padrón • Luis Navarro

María Ximena Urbina Carrasco is a Chilean historian. She is best known for her work on the colonial era in the fjords and channels of Patagonia. She did her undergraduate studies at the Pontifical Catholic University of Valparaiso (PUCV), and her Ph.D. at the University of Seville.

Her work has earned her various history awards. Since 2015 she is a full member of the Naval and Maritime History Academy of Chile and since 2019, of the Chilean Academy of History. She is a full professor at the Institute of History of the PUCV, as well as Editor of its scientific journal named Historia 396.

== Scholar career ==
Born in Valparaíso, she is the daughter of the Chilean historian, Rodolfo Urbina.

In the early 1990s, Urbina entered the Institute of History of the Pontifical Catholic University of Valparaíso (PUCV), where she received her degree as a professor and graduate. Likewise, she completed her master's degree at the same faculty. Thereby, in the early-2000s, Urbina was able to complete her doctorate at her then-known University of Seville, which ended up installing her as a professor at the PUCV.

On April 9, 2019, Urbina achieved an important milestone in her career by being officially admitted to the Chilean Academy of History. On the other hand, on January 13, 2020, the PUCV recognized her academic excellence.

On August 31, 2020, Urbina participated in the release of the book General History of the Kingdom of Chile at the University of the Andes, Chile. On the other hand, at the San Sebastián University (December 2020), she participated in the presentation of a book about the myth of the City of the Caesars. Years later, in 2023, Dr. Urbina managed to win a Fondecyt project focused on the British-Australian navigator, Phillip Parker King.

== Works ==
=== Books ===
- Los conventillos en Valparaíso, 1880–1920, Ediciones Universitarias de la Pontificia Universidad Católica de Valparaíso (2002).
- La Frontera de Arriba en el Reino de Chile, Centro de Investigaciones Barros Arana, Santiago de Chile (2009).
- Fuentes Para la Historia de la Patagonia Occidental en el periodo colonial, Tomo I (siglos XVI y XVII), Ediciones Universitarias de la Pontificia Universidad Católica de Valparaíso (2014).
- Fuentes Para la Historia de la Patagonia Occidental en el periodo colonial, Tomo II (siglo XVIII), Ediciones Universitarias de la Pontificia Universidad Católica de Valparaíso (2018).

== See also ==
- Pontifical Catholic University of Valparaíso History Institute
