= Bueno River =

River in Chile

Bueno River (Río Bueno)
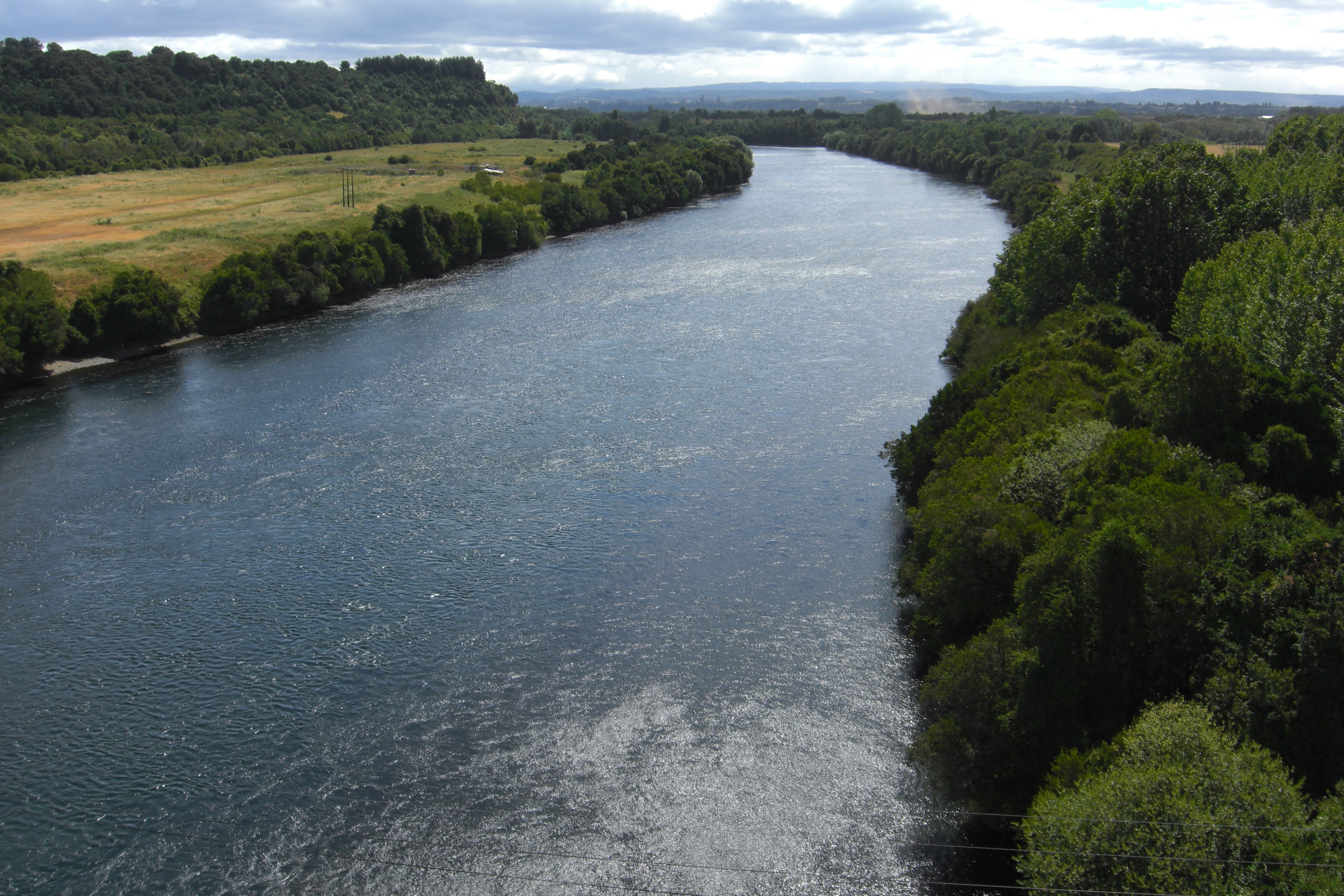
- The river as seen from Chile Route 5

- Location of mouth

Location
- Country: Chile

Physical characteristics
- Source
  - location: Ranco Lake
- Mouth
  - location: La Barra and Valdivian Coastal Reserve, Pacific Ocean
  - coordinates: 40°14′41″S 73°42′50″W
  - elevation: 0 m (0 ft)
- Length: 130 km (81 mi)
- Basin size: 15,367 km^{2} (5,933 sq mi)
- Discharge
  - average: 570 m^{3}/s (20,000 cu ft/s)

The Bueno River (Spanish: Río Bueno) is a river in southern Chile. It originates in Ranco Lake and like most of Chile rivers it drains into the Pacific Ocean at the southern boundary of the Valdivian Coastal Reserve. Its lower flow forms the border between Osorno Province and Ranco Province. Traditionally, it marks also the northern boundary of the indigenous Huilliche territory known as Futahuillimapu. The river passes through Río Bueno commune and city that takes name from the river.

The major tributaries of the Bueno River are the Pilmaiquén River and the Rahue River, joining the river from the south. The former is the outlet of Puyehue Lake and the latter is the outlet of Rupanco Lake.

Starting upstream the following settlements lie along the river: Puerto Nuevo at the source, Río Bueno, Trumao, Llancacura, and La Barra at the outflow in the ocean.

The original Huilliche name for the river was Huenuleufu, a combination of huenu "upper" and leufü "river". Río Bueno is thus a hybrid word with huenu being replaced by phono-semantic matching with the Spanish word bueno "good". A more recent translation of the indigenous name puts it as "Celestial River".

In 1654, the Bueno River was the site of the battle of Río Bueno between a Spanish slave-hunting expedition and local Mapuche-Huilliches. This battle ended in clear defeat for the Spanish forces whose pontoon bridge broke apart causing many casualties. On January 27, 1759, the river was again the site of a Spanish-Huilliche battle. In the years following the battle, the Spanish established a Franciscan mission and a fort next to the river.
