= Parliament of Las Canoas =

The Parliament of Las Canoas (Spanish: Parlamento de Las Canoas) was a diplomatic meeting between Mapuche-Huilliches and Spanish authorities in 1793 held at the confluence of Rahue River and Damas River near what is today the city of Osorno. The parliament was summoned by the Royal Governor of Chile Ambrosio O'Higgins after the Spanish had suppressed an uprising by the Mapuche-Huilliches of Ranco and Río Bueno in 1792. The parliament is historically relevant since the treaty signed at the end of the meeting allowed the Spanish to reestablish the city of Osorno (Note: The city of Osorno had originally been founded by the Spanish in 1558 but was destroyed by Mapuche-Huilliches in 1602 during the destruction of the Seven Cities.) and secure the transit rights between Valdivia and the Spanish mainland settlements near Chiloé Archipelago. The indigenous signatories recognized the king of Spain as their sovereign but they kept considerable autonomy in the lands they did not cede. The treaty is unique in that it was the first time Mapuches formally ceded territory to the Spanish.

The Mapuche-Huilliche leaders summoned by the Spanish to the parliament were those whose lands were affected by the Spanish proposal. The Mapuche-Huilliche leaders present in the parliament were Catrihuala, Iñil, Caniu, Calfuguir, Ancaguir, Colin, Naguinguir and Pichi Huaiquipan plus the messengers of the Cunco Paylapan. The caciques Juan Queipul and José Antitipay, who belonged to the area, were not present at the parliament since they were in Santiago where they held a small parliament with Ambrosio O'Higgins in person. (Note: This meeting goes by the name Parliament of Santiago (1793).) The issues to be dealt with were the same as in Las Canoas.

== Background ==
Beginning in the mid-18th century the Spanish enclave of Valdivia begun a period of agricultural expansion. The expansion, that mainly directed to the south, was done mostly by pacific means, but hostilities with indigenous Huilliches did occur. The expansion of Valdivia included a process of mestization and the purchasing of indigenous lands by criollos and transformation of previous indigenous proprietors into inquilinos. In contrast the Spanish settlement at Chiloé Archipelago had a history of conflicts with the indigenous peoples north of the archipelago. After the Valdivian colonization had reached Bueno River Spanish authorities pushed for connecting the city of Valdivia with the settlements at Chacao Channel by a road. This way the Spanish authorities hoped to make its possible for Valdivia and Chiloé to offer each other mutual aid in the case of an invasion by a European power.
