= Futahuillimapu =

Traditional territory of the Huilliche people

willi "south"
- People: Huilliche
- Language: Chedungun
- Country: Futahuillimapu

Futahuillimapu within the modern boundaries of Chile.

Futahuillimapu, or Fütawillimapu, is a traditional territory of the Huilliche people. Futahuillimapu spans the land between Bueno River and Reloncaví Sound. Futahuillimapu means "great land of the south".

Back in the 18th century when this territory was free of foreign rule its western part, corresponding to the Chilean Coast Range and its foothills was inhabited by so-called Cuncos while proper Huilliches lived in the flatlands of the eastern portion corresponding to the Central Valley.

After the destruction of Osorno in 1602 Futahuillimapu and the whole area between Valdivia and the settlements of Calbuco and Carelmapu remained independent indigenous territory closed to the Spanish. The Spanish had thus little information on this territory and had to rely on hearsay. This lack of concrete knowledge of the territory fueled speculations about the mythical City of the Caesars.

The territory was ravaged by a Spanish militia in 1792. The next year the Spanish-Huilliche Parliament of Las Canoas was held. In this official meeting local chiefs had to accept the incorporation of Futahuillimapu to the Spanish Empire and allow the Spanish to reestablish the city of Osorno. Soon after the reestablishment of Osorno nearby Huilliche lands begun to be coveted by the new settlers whose purchase of land was only occasionally objected by local governor Juan Mackenna. In the mid-19th century these settlers were joined by new ones from Germany whom the Huilliche called leupe lonko (blond heads). Loss of lands by the Huilliche in the 19th century was often related to scams, language barriers, and the decline of legal framework, such as the comisario de naciones, that protected indigenous rights. As result of Chilean and German settlers settling around Bueno River in the 19th century, Huilliches living in the Central Valley migrated to the coastal region of Osorno.
