= Huilliche people =

Ethnic group native to south-central Chile

Huilliches, Mapuche-Huilliche
- Flag of the General Council of the Chiefs of Chiloé

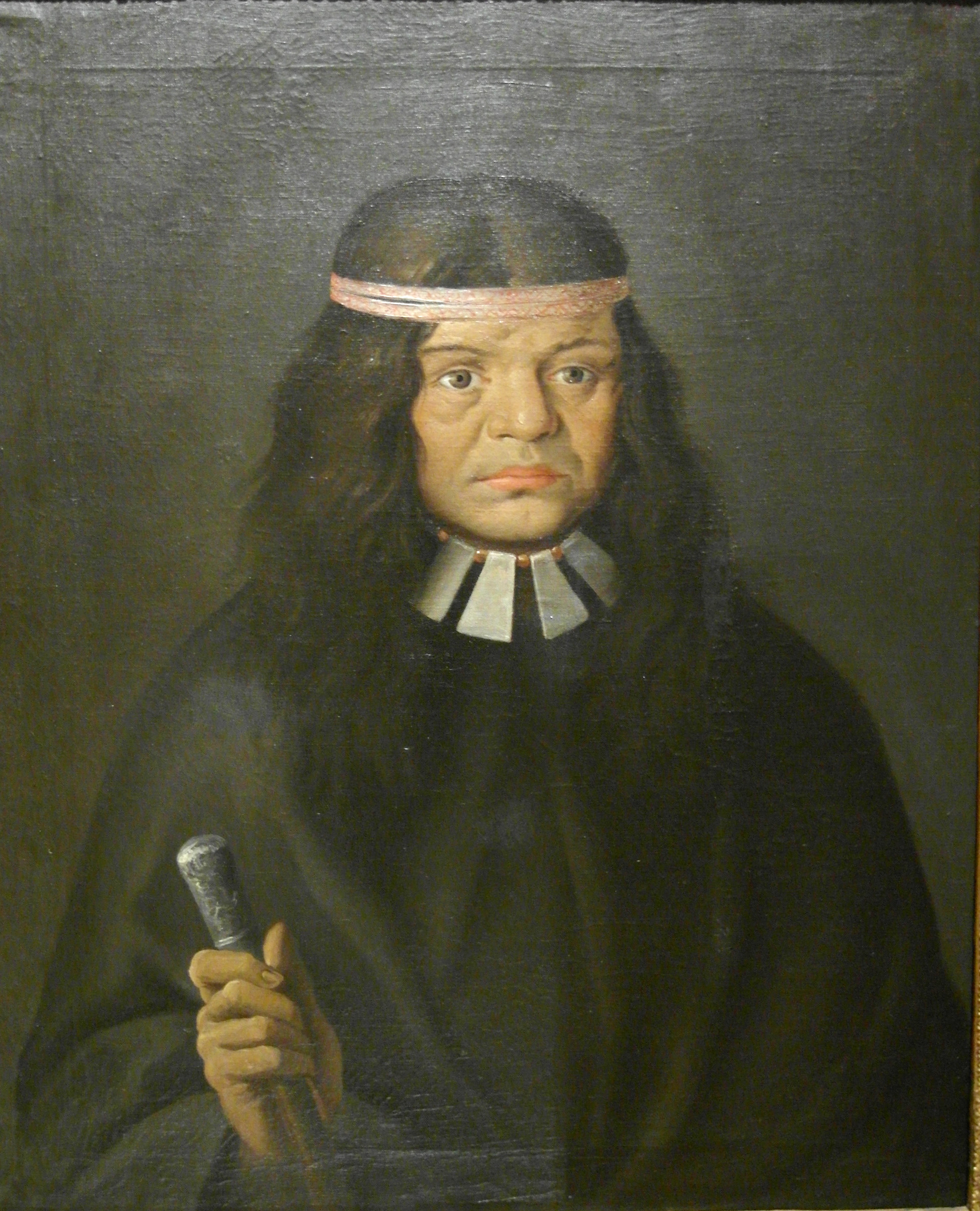
- Catiguala, a cacique of the Huilliche in the 18th century

Total population
- 17,000 in Chiloé Archipelago

Regions with significant populations
- Futahuillimapu and Chiloé Archipelago, Chile

Languages
- Spanish (Chilean Spanish), Huilliche

Religion
- Christianity (mainly Roman Catholic) and Indigenous religion

Related ethnic groups
- Cunco people, Mapuche people, Picunche people, Chilean people, Veliche people, Payos

willi "south"
- People: Huilliche
- Language: Chedungun
- Country: Futahuillimapu

The Huilliche (Spanish pronunciation: [(g)wi.ˈʝi.tʃe], Huilliche pronunciation: [wi.ˈʎi.tʃe]), Huiliche or Huilliche-Mapuche are the southern part of the Mapuche macroethnic group in Chile and Argentina. Located in the Zona Sur, they inhabit both Futahuillimapu ("great land of the south") and, as the Cunco or Veliche subgroup, the northern half of Chiloé Island. The Huilliche are the principal Indigenous people of those regions. According to Ricardo E. Latcham the term Huilliche started to be used in Spanish after the second founding of Valdivia in 1645, adopting the usage of the Mapuches of Araucanía for the southern Mapuche tribes. Huilliche means 'southerners' (Mapudungun willi 'south' and che 'people'.) A genetic study showed significant affinities between Huilliches and Indigenous peoples east of the Andes, which suggests but does not prove a partial origin in present-day Argentina.

During the 16th, 17th, and 18th centuries, the mainland Huilliche were generally successful at resisting Spanish encroachment. However, after the Figueroa incursion of 1792 Huilliches were decisively defeated and their territory was gradually opened to European settlement beginning with the Parliament of Las Canoas. Today, most Huilliche speak Spanish, but some, especially older adults, speak the Huilliche language. Laurelia sempervirens, known in Huilliche triwe and in Spanish as laurel, is the ritual tree of the Huilliche of Futahuillimapu.

The main modern areas of Huilliche settlement are two; San Juan de la Costa west of Osorno and Compu-Chadmo in the southeast of Chiloé Island.

The mythological cosmologies of the Huilliche has many parallels in the Indigenous religions of the Central Andes including the Inca religion.

== Colonization ==
Map showing Indigenous peoples of Chile; the Huilliche are shaded peach, near the middle of the country.

=== 16th century ===
In the 1540s Spanish conquereros led by Pedro de Valdivia arrived in Central Chile from newly conquered Peru. Between 1549 and 1553 the Spanish founded several cities in Mapuche territory and one in Huilliche territory: Valdivia. Albeit the death of Pedro de Valdivia in 1553 halted the Spanish conquests for a while Osorno and Castro were established in Huilliche territory in 1558 and 1567 respectively. The Spanish defeat by Mapuches in the battle of Curalaba in 1598 triggered a general uprising that led to the destruction of all Spanish cities in Huilliche territory except Castro.

=== 17th century ===
The portion of Futahuillimapu south of Maipué River became largely depopulated following a period of pillaging by the Spanish and loyalist Huilliches that had relocated from Osorno to the forts of Carelmapu and Calbuco. After Valdivia was refounded in 1645, the Spanish struggled to establish a land route to the vicinities of Chiloé Archipelago across independent Huilliche territory. (Note: The idea behind this road was to provide a provide pathway for reciprocal military aid in case of an invasion by a foreign power, likely Britain.)

There are reports in the 17th and 18th centuries of internal conflicts among the Huilliche. This may have stunted population growth.

=== 18th century ===
In late 18th century Basque navigator José de Moraleda wrote that Huilliches of Osorno were more stocky, agile and of general better appearance than the people of Chiloé. Their ponchos were described by Moraleds as less pleasing ("vistosos") than those of Chiloé.

A new battle took place between Spanish and Huilliche forces in 1759 near the shores of río Bueno. The outcome of the battle has been subject ot different interpretations. The battle of 1759 was an exception to the overall policy of befriending Indigenous communities on behalf of the Spanish authorities in Valdivia.

In 1792 the Huilliches were ravaged by a Spanish army led by Tomás de Figueroa. A peace parliament and treaty was signed in 1793. In the treaty Huilliche property was recognized by the Spanish.

=== 19th century ===
Sociedad Stuttgart, a society established in the 19th century to bring German settlers to Chile, purchased about 15 000 km^{2} under fraudulent conditions from Huilliches in the Precordillera east of Osorno. This purchase was later ratified by Chilean courts and serves to illustrate how Chilean authorities ignored their own legal order that guaranteed Huilliche property.

As result of the establishment of Chilean and European settlers, including Germans, around Bueno River, Osorno Huilliches living in the Central Valley migrated to the coastal region of Osorno. In the 1920s, The economy of Osorno shifted towards cattle farming, with land ownership concentrated among the German immigrants, and many Huilliches became peasants of haciendas.

== See also ==
- Colonial alerce logging and trade

== Bibliography ==
- Barros Arana, Diego (2000) [1886]. Historia General de Chile (in Spanish). Vol. VI (2 ed.). Santiago, Chile: Editorial Universitaria.
- Alberto Trivero (1999); Trentrenfilú, Proyecto de Documentación Ñuke Mapu. (in Spanish)
- Montt Pinto, Isabel (1971). Breve Historia de Valdivia (in Spanish). Editorial Francisco de Aguirre.
- Rumian Cisterna, Salvador (2020-09-17). Gallito Catrilef: Colonialismo y defensa de la tierra en San Juan de la Costa a mediados del siglo XX (M.Sc. thesis) (in Spanish). University of Los Lagos.
- Otero, Luis (2006). La huella del fuego: Historia de los bosques nativos. Poblamiento y cambios en el paisaje del sur de Chile. Pehuén Editores. ISBN 956-16-0409-4.
- Urbina Carrasco, María Ximena (2009). La Frontera "de arriba" en Chile Colonial (in Spanish). Ediciones Universitarias de Valparaíso. ISBN 978-956-17-0433-6.
- Villalobos R., Sergio; Silva G., Osvaldo; Silva V., Fernando; Estelle M., Patricio (1974). Historia de Chile (in Spanish) (1995 ed.). Editorial Universitaria. ISBN 956-11-1163-2.
