= Zúñiga (surname) =

- Place of origin: Spain

Zúñiga is a Spanish surname originally from the Basque language. Notable people with the surname include:

- Adela Elizabeth Zúñiga (born 1942), Honduran politician
- Alejandro Zúñiga, Chilean judoka
- Alonso de Ercilla y Zúñiga (1533–1594), Spanish nobleman, soldier and poet
- Alonso Zúñiga (born 1980), Chilean footballer
- Álvaro Manrique de Zúñiga, marqués de Villamanrique (died 1590), Spanish nobleman and the seventh viceroy of New Spain
- Andrés Zúñiga, Mexican television actor and singer
- Antonio de Zúñiga (c.1458–1533), Prior of Castile, Spanish general and Viceroy of Catalonia
- Arcadio Zúñiga y Tejeda (1858–1892), Mexican composer
- Arturo Zúñiga (born 1982), Chilean politician
- Baltasar de Zúñiga (1561–1622), Spanish diplomat, royal favourite and minister
- Baltasar de Zúñiga, 1st Duke of Arión (1658–1727), Spanish viceroy of New Spain
- Bernardita Zúñiga (born 1983), Chilean model
- Cristián Gutiérrez (soccer, born 1997) (born 1997), Chilean footballer
- Daphne Zuniga (born 1962), American actress
- David Zuniga, American wrestler
- Diego de Zúñiga (1536–1597), Augustinian Hermit and academic
- Diego Gutiérrez Zuñiga (born 1997), Canadian soccer player
- Diego López de Zúñiga, 4th Count of Nieva (c. 1510–1564), Spanish viceroy of Peru
- Dilan Zúñiga (born 1996), Chilean footballer
- Enrique Zúñiga (born 1976), Mexican basketball player
- Felipe de Zúñiga y Ontiveros (1717–1793), scientist of New Spain
- Fernando Zúñiga (born 1968), Chilean-Swiss linguist
- Francisca Fernández-Hall Zúñiga (1921–2002), Guatemalan engineer and diplomat
- Francisco López de Zúñiga, 2nd Marquis of Baides (1599–1655), Spanish soldier, Royal Governor of Chile
- Francisco Zúñiga (1912–1998), Costa Rican and Mexican artist
- Fulgencio Zúñiga (born 1977), Colombian boxer
- Gaspar de Zúñiga, 5th Count of Monterrey (1560–1606), Spanish nobleman, ninth viceroy of New Spain
- Gerardo Flores Zúñiga (born 1986), Mexican footballer
- Guillermo Zúñiga Martínez (1942–2015), Mexican politician
- Hernaldo Zúñiga (born 1955), Nicaraguan singer
- Íñigo López de Mendoza y Zúñiga (1476–1535), Castilian cardinal, archbishop of Burgos, bishop of Coria and abbot of Santa Maria de la Vid
- Jabari Zuniga (born 1997), American football player
- José Zúñiga (born 1965), Honduran–American actor
- José de Züñiga (1755–?), Spanish settler in California
- José Alfredo Zúñiga (born 1985), Mexican boxer
- Josefina Klinger Zúñiga (born 1965), Colombian environmentalist
- Juan Domingo de Zuñiga y Fonseca (1640–1716), Spanish military and political figure
- Juan Camilo Zúñiga (born 1985), Colombian footballer
- Juan Carlos Zuniga, Honduran mayor of San Pedro Sula
- Juan José Zúñiga, Bolivian military official
- Julio Granda Zúñiga (born 1967), Peruvian chess player
- Laura Zúñiga (born 1985), Mexican model and beauty queen
- Laura Zúñiga Cáceres, Honduran human rights and indigenous rights activist
- Ledy Zuñiga, Ecuadorian Minister of Justice
- Luis de Requesens y Zúñiga (1528–1576), Spanish governor of the Netherlands
- Maite Zúñiga (born 1964), Basque athlete
- Manuel Zúñiga (born 1960), Spanish footballer
- Mariana Zúñiga (born 2002), Chilean Paralympic archer
- Mario Pérez Zúñiga (born 1982), Mexican footballer
- Markos Moulitsas Zúñiga (born 1971), American political columnist and publisher
- Martín Zúñiga (born 1970), Mexican footballer
- Martín Eduardo Zúñiga (born 1993), Mexican footballer
- Mauricio de Zúñiga (died 1816), Governor of Florida in 1812–13 and 1816
- Miguel Sierra Zúñiga, Mexican politician
- Nicolás Zúñiga y Miranda (1865–1925), Mexican eccentric
- Nigel Zúniga (born 1971), Honduran football player
- Nonoy Zuñiga, Filipino singer
- Olivia Zúñiga (1916–1992), Mexican poet, novelist, and essayist
- Pedro de Zúñiga (1383–1453), Spanish nobleman.
- Priscilla Zuniga (born 1990), American wrestler
- Rafael Zuñiga (born 1963), Bolivian boxer
- Ricardo Miranda Zuñiga (born 1971), Nicaraguan-American artist
- Sara Chacón Zúñiga (1914–1998), first winner of the Miss Ecuador title
- Sebastián Zúñiga (born 1990), Chilean footballer
- Todd Zuniga (born 1975), American writer
- Violeta Zúñiga (1933–2019), Chilean human rights activist
- Xavier Azuara Zúñiga (born 1979), Mexican politician
- Ysrael Zúñiga (born 1976), Peruvian footballer
