= Francisco Burgoa =

Francisco Burgoa (b. Oaxaca, c.1600; d. Tepozotlán in 1681) was a historian of the Dominican Order in Mexico. He entered the Dominican Order on 2 August 1629, and soon became a master in theology. The voluminous books written by him on the past of his native Mexican province of Antequera, (now called Oaxaca), are very rare and valuable, though not absolutely reliable on several topics. Burgoa utilizes material on particular Dominicans from Agustín Dávila Padilla, but emphasizes their work in Oaxaca. Burgoa was curate of several Indian parishes and his knowledge of the native languages, the Zapotec and Mixtec, is stated to have been very thorough. In 1649 he became Provincial of the province of San Hipólito and took part in the chapter general of his order in Rome in 1656. Returning to Mexico with the title of vicar-general, a member of the Spanish Inquisition, and Commissary and Inspector of Libraries of New Spain (Mexico), he again became Provincial of Oaxaca in 1662. He was interested in several ecclesiastical foundations and improvements, and was highly respected at the time of his death. The two historical and geographical works through which he is best known are the Palestra histórica, ó Historia de la Provincia de San Hipólito de Oaxaca, de la Orden de Predicadores (Mexico, 1670), and the Descripción geográfica de la América setentrional etc. (Mexico, 1674). He published a number of sermons and also wrote Itinerario de Oaxaca á Roma y de Roma a Oaxaca.

== Sources ==
- Pinelo, Epitome de la biblioteca oriental y occidental (Madrid, 1737)
- Nicolás Antonio, Bibliotheca hispana nova (Madrid, 1733–38)
- Eguiara, Biblioteca mexicana (Mexico, 1755)
- Beristain, Biblioteca hispano-americana etc. (Amecameca, 1883)
- Brasseur de Bourbourg, Bibl. mexico-guatemalienne (Paris, 1871).
- Bandelier, Adolph Francis Alphonse (1908). "Francisco Burgoa" . Catholic Encyclopedia. Vol. 3.
