= José de Souza =

José de Souza is the name of

- José de Souza (javelin thrower) (fl. 1981-1983), Brazilian javelin thrower
- José de Souza (discus thrower) (born 1965), Brazilian discus thrower and shot putter
- José de Souza (hurdler) (born 1963), Beninese hurdler
- José de Souza (long-distance runner) (born 1971), Brazilian long-distance runner

See also

- José Mariano Beristain y Martin de Souza (1756–1817), Mexican bibliographer
