= Fernando Zúñiga =

Linguist

Fernando Zúñiga (born 6 January 1968) is a Chilean-born Swiss linguist at the University of Bern, where he held the chair of General Linguistics from February, 2013 until January, 2024; after retiring for health reasons, he became an associate researcher at the Institute of Linguistics. He works in the fields of linguistic typology and indigenous languages of the Americas, especially Mapudungun and Algonquian languages.

He was elected as a member of the Academia Europaea in 2018.

== Partial bibliography ==
- Mapudungun, Munich: LINCOM Europa, 2000 ISBN 3895869767
- Deixis and Alignment. Inverse systems in indigenous languages of the Americas, Amsterdam/Philadelphia: John Benjamins, 2006, ISBN 90 272 2982 1
- Mapudungun: el habla mapuche. Introducción a la lengua mapuche, con notas comparativas y un CD, Santiago de Chile: Centro de Estudios Públicos, 2006, ISBN 956 7015 40 6
- Benefactives and Malefactives. Typological perspectives and case studies, co-edited with Seppo Kittilä, Amsterdam/Philadelphia: John Benjamins, 2010, ISBN 978 90 272 0673 2
- Word Formation in South American Languages, co-edited with Swintha Danielsen and Katja Hannss, Amsterdam/Philadelphia: John Benjamins, 2014, ISBN 978 90 272 59288
- Advances in Research on Semantic Roles, co-edited with Seppo Kittilä, Amsterdam/Philadelphia: John Benjamins, 2016, ISBN 978 90 272 42761
- Typological Hierarchies in Synchrony and Diachrony, co-edited with Sonia Cristofaro, Amsterdam/Philadelphia: John Benjamins, 2017, ISBN 978 90 272 00266
- Grammatical Voice, co-authored with Seppo Kittilä, Cambridge: Cambridge University Press, 2019, ISBN 978 13 166 71399
- Mapudungun: el habla mapuche. Introducción a la lengua mapuche, con notas comparativas y audio, Santiago de Chile: Fondo de Cultura Económica / Centro de Estudios Públicos, 2022, ISBN 978 9562892469
- Applicative constructions in the world's languages, co-edited with Denis Creissels, Berlin: De Gruyter Mouton, 2024, ISBN 9783110735482
