= Monastery of Santiago Apóstol, Cuilapan de Guerrero =

Monastery in Cuilapan de Guerrero, Mexico

Convento de Santiago Apóstol
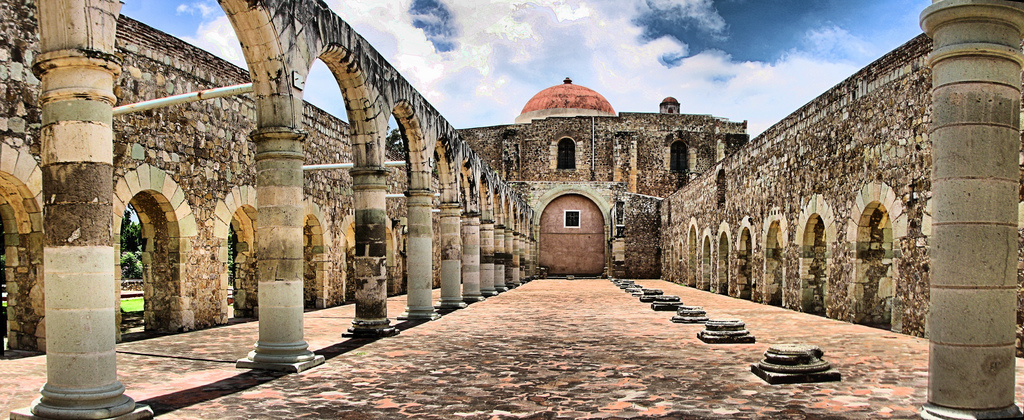
- Inside of the open-air Basilica

Religion
- Affiliation: Roman Catholic
- Province: Archdiocese of Antequera, Oaxaca
- Rite: Latin Rite
- Year consecrated: 1556

Location
- Location: Cuilapan de Guerrero, Oaxaca de Juárez
- Country: Mexico
- Interactive map of Convento de Santiago Apóstol
- Coordinates: 16.99228°N 96.77907°W

Architecture
- Architect: Antonio de Barbosa
- Type: church
- Style: Gothic, Renaissance, Plateresque, Mudéjar
- Groundbreaking: 1556
- Completed: 1570 (halted)
- Materials: cantera

The Ex-monastery of Santiago Apóstol is located in the town of Cuilapan de Guerrero in the Mexican state of Oaxaca. The fortress-like complex is easily seen from the highway as one travels south from the capital city of Oaxaca on the road leading to Villa de Zaachila, and it is visited by both Mexican and international tourists. The complex is located on a small hill which gives it a view of much of the valley area. It is one of the most extravagant and elaborate colonial era constructions in Oaxaca, but it is often overlooked in favor of churches and monasteries located in the Mexico City area. Built of green quarried stone and river rocks, it is a quiet place where footsteps can echo in the hallways. The extravagances of the site, including the tall basilica, the elaborate baptismal font, the Gothic cloister and murals remain as national treasures. The decorative work of the monastery, especially its murals, are important because they show a systematic blending of indigenous elements into the Christian framework, done in order to support the evangelization process in the local Mixtec and Zapotec peoples. The single-naved church is used for worship but the roofless basilica and cloister are under the control of INAH, which uses many of the second-floor rooms of the cloister as workshops for restoration projects and runs a small museum with important liturgical items from the 16th century.

== History ==
Construction of the monastery complex began in the 1550s. The Dominicans came to Oaxaca and established themselves in Cuilapan in 1550, taking charge of evangelization efforts in the central valleys region. Official license to build the complex was granted in 1555 by viceroy Luís de Velasco and contained the mandate that the construction be “modest”. Construction began in 1556 with Antonio de Barbosa as designer. The complex is a mixture of several architectural styles that were predominant in Europe in the 16th century and includes Gothic, Renaissance, Plateresque and Mudéjar elements. There are also some indigenous elements to be found in the decorative work. Unlike larger monastic institutions in Mexico City and Puebla, which could have as many as fifty monks, only four friars were stationed there in 1555, Domingo de Aguiñaga, Tomás Hurtado, Vicente Gómez and Antonio Barbosa. They were also in charge of the regular clergy, who probably built their church in the middle of the old Mixtec town.

Abuses of the encomienda system, which reduced native population to near slaves, often led to grandiose projects, violating the mandate for modesty, with documents from the 1560s admonishing friars for their exploitation of native workers. Construction of the complex was halted in the 1570s and the precise reason is not known. Possibilities include the lack of funds, or that the complex had become so sumptuous that authorities stopped it. Another very likely reason was a dispute over who should continue paying for the construction. If a monastery was built on encomienda land, then the encomendero (in this case the Cortés family) would pay. If built on Crown lands (such as the city of Antequera) then the Crown was responsible. Disputes over the land led to dispute over who needed to pay for the construction of the monastery. Another possibility was the native population declined from about 43,000 in the 1520s to 7,000 in 1600, leaving no workers. The pause was initially meant to be temporary, but it became permanent.

In 1753, the church and monastery was secularized, meaning control passed from the Dominicans to regular priests. At this time, the monastery had a large collection of ecclesiastical ornaments, painted altarpieces, polychrome sculptures and murals. The complex served as the principal site of interaction between the native populations and the Spaniards and was the center of the political, economic, social and religious life of the town, becoming Cuilapan’s identifying feature. However, from this point the wealth and prestige of the institution declined. These secular authorities neglected the maintenance needs of the complex and it deteriorated until it was finally divested of its religious function by the 19th century. Vicente Guerrero was imprisoned in the small rooms of the lower cloister by political opponents and subsequently executed on 14 February 1831.

The basilica and church remained unfinished and mostly unused as late as the 19th century. The single-naved church was roofed in the 19th and early 20th centuries and is the only portion of the complex which is used for worship. The basilica and monasteries are tourist attractions under the control of INAH. The Cristero War forced the closing of the complex altogether in 1926. When it reopened three years later, much of it was converted into a school for local rural children. Ten years later, that school was relocated to San Antonio de Cal and it was declared a national monument by Instituto Nacional de Arqueología e Historia (INAH) on 10 July 1937.

The main elements of the complex include the atrium, the three-aisled basilica, the single-naved church, the two-story cloister, the porteria (covered porch entrance to the cloister), a pilgrim reception area and a number of small chapels.

== Structure ==
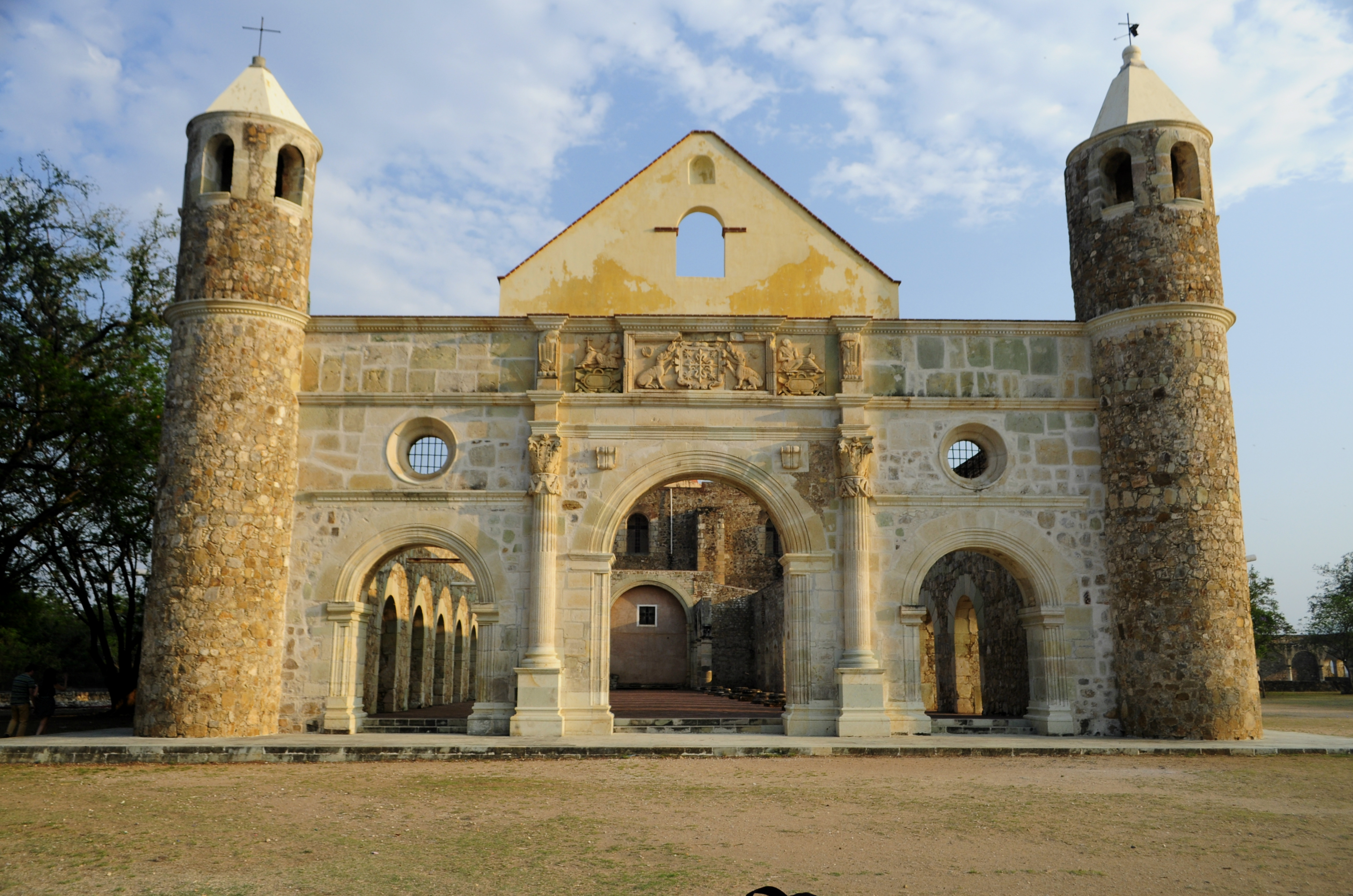
The ex-monistery complex

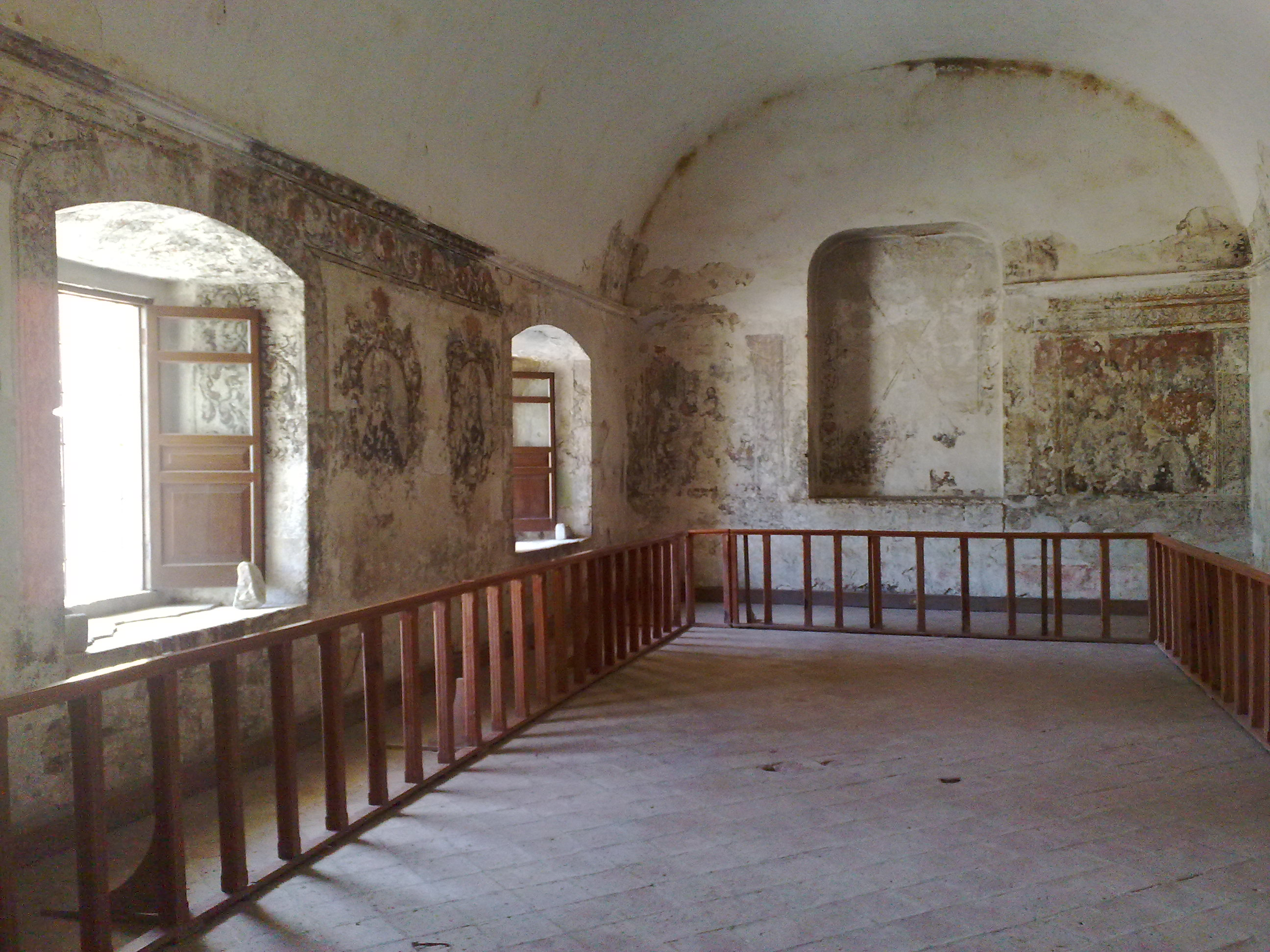
Rests of Colonial mural paintings

The complex is center on a large walled courtyard or atrium, with small stone chapels in the northeastern and northwestern corners. This rather large atrium had a practical as well as symbolic function. The atrium resembled the extensive courtyards (teocallis) of pre-Hispanic temples, and provided space for the 20,000 people that inhabited the area in the 1560s. With only four friars and a small enclosed church, large services in this open area, especially on Sundays and holidays, became the only practical solution The atrium possessed a large atrium cross similar to those found in Acolman, Alzacoalco, Tepoztlán and Pátzcuaro, but only the base now remains.

The largest structure is a rectangular unroofed basilica with elegant arches decorating its exterior facades. The facade is Plateresque, with three arched entrances topped by a triangular pediment with a crest over that. In the center of the pediment, there is the coat of arms of the Dominican order with a dog to the side, symbolizing Saint Dominic of Guzman. Flanking the facade are two towers with circular bases topped with peaked cones. The interior divides into three naves by heavy columns with Tuscan capitals, which were meant to support a complex Gothic roof. These arcades of stone columns are mirrored by a series of doorless arched entrances on the eastern and western facades of the building. This has led some to classify the building as an “open chapel,” but the purpose of this unusual feature is not truly known. The three nave design is also interesting as this had mostly gone out of fashion in other parts of Mexico in favor of single naved structures. No documents from that time explain why the older design was chosen A plaque located inside has a mixture of Mixtec signs and the date 1555 written in Arabic script

One curious aside is a small wall and a large pile of rocks which is located to the side of this basilica. This is the remnants of the first wall, mixed with rock being prepared to build a house for Hernán Cortés. However, Cortés later abandoned this project.

While smaller, a more traditional style church is considered to be the main one, and is still used as a religious building. The building is austere with heavy buttresses supporting a semicircular dome In the interior, there is an altarpiece with paintings attributed to Andrés de la Concha and a headstone marking the final resting place of Fray Francisco Burgoa. This church has only one nave with a choir and an upper choir area, baptistery and presbytery. At the side of the church is the area for pilgrims which preserves some of its dependencies and vestiges of its murals. The pilgrim area would often house travelers who did not have funds for hotel.

The cloister is a two-story building, and much of it underwent restoration work in 1962. INAH occupies many of the second floor with workshops for restoration projects. There are also portraits of priests on the second floor which have been almost entirely lost to time. Vicente Guerrero was imprisoned in the noviate wing of this cloister for three days, with the window of his cell one of the site’s attractions. To the south of the monastery, there is a monument to the execution.

One of the most significant aspects of the complex is its murals and other decorative features. There are both monochromatic and polychromatic murals, with monochromatic dominating. The murals contain Biblical and other religious scenes which show some interesting localized modifications, starting with the use of monochrome paintings. Elements of imagery and symbols from Mixtec and Zapotec religious and cultural traditions can be found in both the murals and in some of the architectural elements. The purpose of the blend was to juxtapose the spiritual traditions of Mesoamerica and the Iberian Peninsula. The idea was to make conversion easier for the indigenous people by allowing them to recognize similarities and compatibilities between the old and new religions so that there would be gradual conversion and acculturalation. The most obvious of this is the large atrium, which mimics a teocalli or sacred precinct. A mural of the crucifixion on the wall of the sacristy of the basilica has scenery with references to the geographical features of Cuilapan. The monochromatic scenes in the processional corridors contain allusion to the religious practices and cosmogonies of the Mixtecs.

== Bibliography ==
- Sara Morasch Taylor (2006). Art and evangelization at the sixteenth-century convento of Santiago Apostol at Cuilapan, Mexico (Ph.D thesis). Bryn Mawr College. Docket AAT 3240495.
