= Luis Abadiano =

Luis Abadiano y Valdés
- Born: José María Ygnacio Luis Obispo Sotero Gonzaga Abadiano y Valdés c. 22 April 1789; Mexico
- Died: 11 October 1854; Mexico City, Mexico
- Other names: Cástulo Luis Abadiano y Valdés
- Occupations: Printer, publisher
- Years active: 19th century
- Title: Printing & publishing
- Spouse: María del Carmen Rita Cabrera y Martínez
- Children: 2

Luis Abadiano y Valdés (born José María Ygnacio Luis Obispo Sotero Gonzaga Abadiano y Valdés; baptised 22 April 1789 – 11 October 1854) was a Mexican printer and publisher in Mexico City, one in a long line of printers, publishers, booksellers and book collectors traceable back to the famous Humanist and bibliographer Juan José de Eguiara y Eguren, founder of the printing house Biblioteca Mexicana (Mexican Library) in 1753.

== Antecedents ==
Juan José Eguiara y Eguren founded the publishing house Biblioteca Mexicana in 1753. He also published the work Biblioteca Mexicana. This was a compilation, a work of literary history, a dictionary of literary biography, and a bibliography, but Eguiara y Egure got only as far as the letter "J".

Eguiara's printing shop was acquired by Licenciado José de Jáuregui in 1767. The following year Jáuregui's establishment merged with that of heirs of María de Ribera. Jáuregui died in 1778, and the business passed to his heirs. In 1791 his nephew José Fernández Jáuregui took over the business and directed it until his death in 1800. His heir was María Fernández de Jáuregui. She died in 1815, and in 1817 the business was sold to Alejandro Valdés.

Valdés was already an established printer, having maintained his own print shop from 1808 to 1814. In 1815 he acquired the business of his famed father, Manuel Antonio Valdés y Munguía. The elder Valdés had been the printer for the Jesuit College of San Ildefonso until 1767. In that year he joined Felipe de Zúñiga y Ontiveros, at that time the largest printer in the Americas. While he was associated with Zúñiga y Ontiveros, Valdés y Munguía was the editor of the Gaceta de México, after its reestablishment in 1784.

The Spanish Constitution of Cádiz of 1812 included a guarantee of freedom of the press. Many more political books and tracts appeared then in the preceding years. Alejandro Valdés continued publishing in this more liberal atmosphere. In 1816 he published the classic bibliography, José Mariano Beristáin y Sousa's Biblioteca Americana Septentrional. This was based on Eguiara's Biblioteca Mexicana, but much updated and expanded.

== Biography ==
Following Mexican independence in 1821, Valdés became imperial printer for the government of Agustín de Iturbide, for the printing of official documents. About this time, Valdés took Luis Abadiano as partner, an association that lasted until Valdés's death in 1831. At this date, the firm was the oldest publisher and bookseller in the country.

In 1836 Luis Abadiano published the following invitation (given in part):

Translation of the Marvelous Image of Our Lady of Guadalupe

"In December 1836 will be presented with new brilliance the glory that was given to our America in 1531. At 9 in the morning of December 10, the celestial image of St. Mary of Guadalupe will be transferred from the Church of the Carmelites to the renowned Collegiate Church, so that the image will be placed in a new altar, a worthy work of the magnificent piety of the Mexicans. Perhaps there will never be seen a procession so solemn and edifying as that which is being prepared for this event, which will be proceeded and accompanied by the most affectionate and fervent orations in all of the Republic."

On the death of Luis Abadiano, the business passed to his sons Francisco and Dionisio.

== Afterwards ==
Between 1825 and 1884, the Abadiano family ran both the printing and the bookselling enterprises descended from Eguiara's original shop. They published several thousand titles, of high quality, and were extremely active as booksellers. The sons were students of Mexican antiquities, and also collectors.

The highly religious and conservative Abadiano family also dealt extensively in books and pamphlets related to the Church in Mexico. During the secular reforms of 1857 through 1861, many of the books and manuscripts of the libraries of Mexico City convents were transferred to the Abadianos or purchased by them and held in trust with the intent of restoring them at a future date. The fear was that they would be appropriated or destroyed by the government.

In 1883 the book business, located at Calle de las Escalerillas (today, calle de Guatemala), was inherited by Eufemio Abadiano, son of Francisco, but Eufemio lacked the inclination or the ability to continue the family tradition. In 1885 he founded a magazine devoted to Mexican literature and history, and also began making reproductions of famous Mexican archaeological objects. However, this enterprise was unsuccessful. In 1887 he announced his intention of auctioning the library and art collection of his father and the stock on hand in the bookstore. In 1889, most of the remaining books were sold to Adolph Sutro of San Francisco.

Sutro (or his agents) acquired everything that remained of the firm — individual titles published from the sixteenth to the mid-19th centuries, the largest collection of 19th-century Mexican pamphlets and ephemera in the world, an extraordinary collection of imprints and manuscripts relating to the Church in Mexico, and publisher's remainders dating from as far back as the mid-18th century. Sutro also bought the Abadiano ledgers, receipt books and galley proofs dating from the late 18th century. He thus obtained an important collection of documents related to the history of printing and bookselling in Mexico.

Much of Sutro's collection (of which his Mexican purchases were only a part), was destroyed in the earthquake and fire of 1906. However the Mexican collection survived intact. It consisted of forty to fifty thousand books, pamphlets, broadsides and manuscripts. In 1913 Sutro's heirs donated his surviving library, including the Mexican collection, to the California State Library under the condition that it remain in San Francisco.

== See also ==
- Juan José Eguiara y Eguren
