= Mapudungun =

Araucanian language

- Mapuche, Chilidúgu
- Mapudungun, Chedungun
- A Mapudungun speaker
- Native to: Chile; Argentina
- Ethnicity: Mapuches
- Native speakers: 410,000 (2024)
- Language family: Araucanian: Mapudungun

Official status
- Official language in: Galvarino (Chile); Padre Las Casas (Chile); Temuco (Chile)

Language codes
- ISO 639-2: arn
- ISO 639-3: arn
- Glottolog: mapu1245
- ELP: Mapudungun
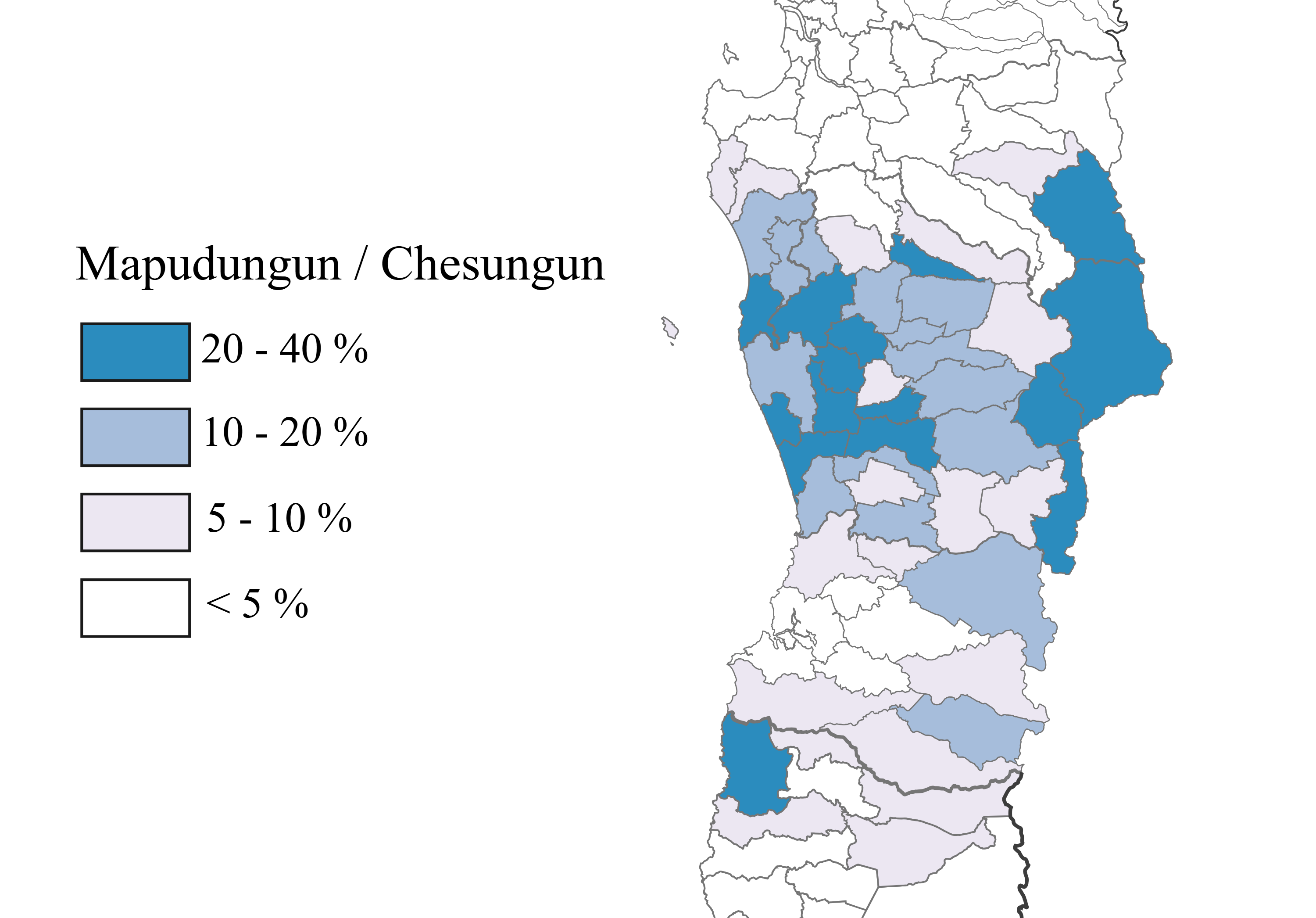
- Extent of the Mapuche language in Araucanía

mapu "land"
- People: Mapuche
- Language: Mapudungun
- Country: Wallmapu

Mapudungun (from mapu 'land' and dungun 'speak, speech', meaning 'the speech of the land'; also rendered as Mapuzugun and Mapudungu) or Mapuche (/məˈpuːtʃi/ mə-POO-che, Mapuche and Spanish: [maˈputʃe]; from mapu 'land' and che 'people', meaning 'the people of the land') is a language, either a language isolate or member of the small Araucanian family related to Huilliche, spoken in south-central Chile and west-central Argentina by the Mapuche people. It was historically known as Araucanian, the name given to the Mapuche by the Spanish. The Mapuche avoid this term as a remnant of Spanish colonialism.

Mapudungun is not an official national language of Chile or Argentina, having received virtually no government support throughout its history. However, since 2013, Mapuche, along with Spanish, has been granted the status of an official language by the local government of Galvarino, one of the many communes of Chile. It is not used as a language of instruction in either country's educational system despite the Chilean government's commitment to provide full access to education in Mapuche areas in southern Chile. There is an ongoing political debate over which alphabet to use as the standard alphabet of written Mapudungun.

In 1982, it was estimated that there were 202,000 Mapuche speakers in Chile, including those that speak the Pehuenche and Huilliche dialects, and another 100,000 speakers in Argentina as of the year 2000. However, a 2002 study suggests that only 16% of those who identify as Mapuche speak the language (active speakers) and another 18% can only understand it (passive speakers). These figures suggest that the total number of active speakers is about 120,000 and that there are slightly more passive speakers of Mapuche in Chile. As of 2013 only 2.4% of urban speakers and 16% of rural speakers use Mapudungun when speaking with children. Only 3.8% of speakers aged 10–19 years in the south of Chile (the language's stronghold) are "highly competent" in the language.

Speakers of Chilean Spanish who also speak Mapudungun tend to use more impersonal pronouns when speaking Spanish. In Cautín Province and Llifén, contact with Mapuche language may be the reason why there is a lack of yeísmo among some Spanish speakers. The language has also influenced the Spanish lexicon within the areas in which it is spoken. At the same time, it has incorporated loanwords from both Spanish and Quechua.

== Name ==
Its speakers call the language mapudungun or mapundungun "speech of the land", mapuchedungun or mapunchedungun "speech of the Mapuche", and chedungun "speech of the people". The names it received in Spanish during the period of Spanish conquest and colonization were Araucano ("Araucanian"), lengua chilena ("Chilean language"), lengua de Chile ("language of Chile"), chileno ("Chilean"), lengua general de Chile ("general language of Chile"), and also chilidungu, which in the language itself means "language of Chile".

The term Araucano was coined during the Conquest of Chile to refer to the people and their language and was commonly used until the 20th century; however, the rejection it provokes among the Mapuche has led to its gradual abandonment in the areas they inhabit and to the increasing use of "Mapuche language" or mapudungun. The term mapudungun means "speech of the land", that is, the language of the country or the native language as opposed to Spanish (wingkadungun, "speech of foreigners"), and it is thought to have emerged relatively late, whereas chedungun is considered an older designation that remains in use in peripheral areas where the language is spoken.

Depending on the alphabet, the sound /tʃ/ is spelled ⟨ch⟩ or ⟨c⟩, and /ŋ/ as ⟨g⟩ or ⟨ng⟩. The language is called either the "speech (d/zuŋun) of the land (mapu)" or the "speech of the people (tʃe)". An ⟨n⟩ may connect the two words. There are thus several ways to write the name of the language:

Alphabet	Mapu-	Mapu with n	Che-/Ce-
Ragileo	Mapuzugun	Mapunzugun	Cezugun
Unified	Mapudungun	Mapundungun	Chedungun
Nhewenh	Mapusdugun	Mapunsdugun	Cesdugun
Azümchefe	Mapuzugun	Mapunzugun	Chezugun
Wirizüŋun	Mapuzüŋun	Mapunzüŋun	Chezüŋun

== Classification ==
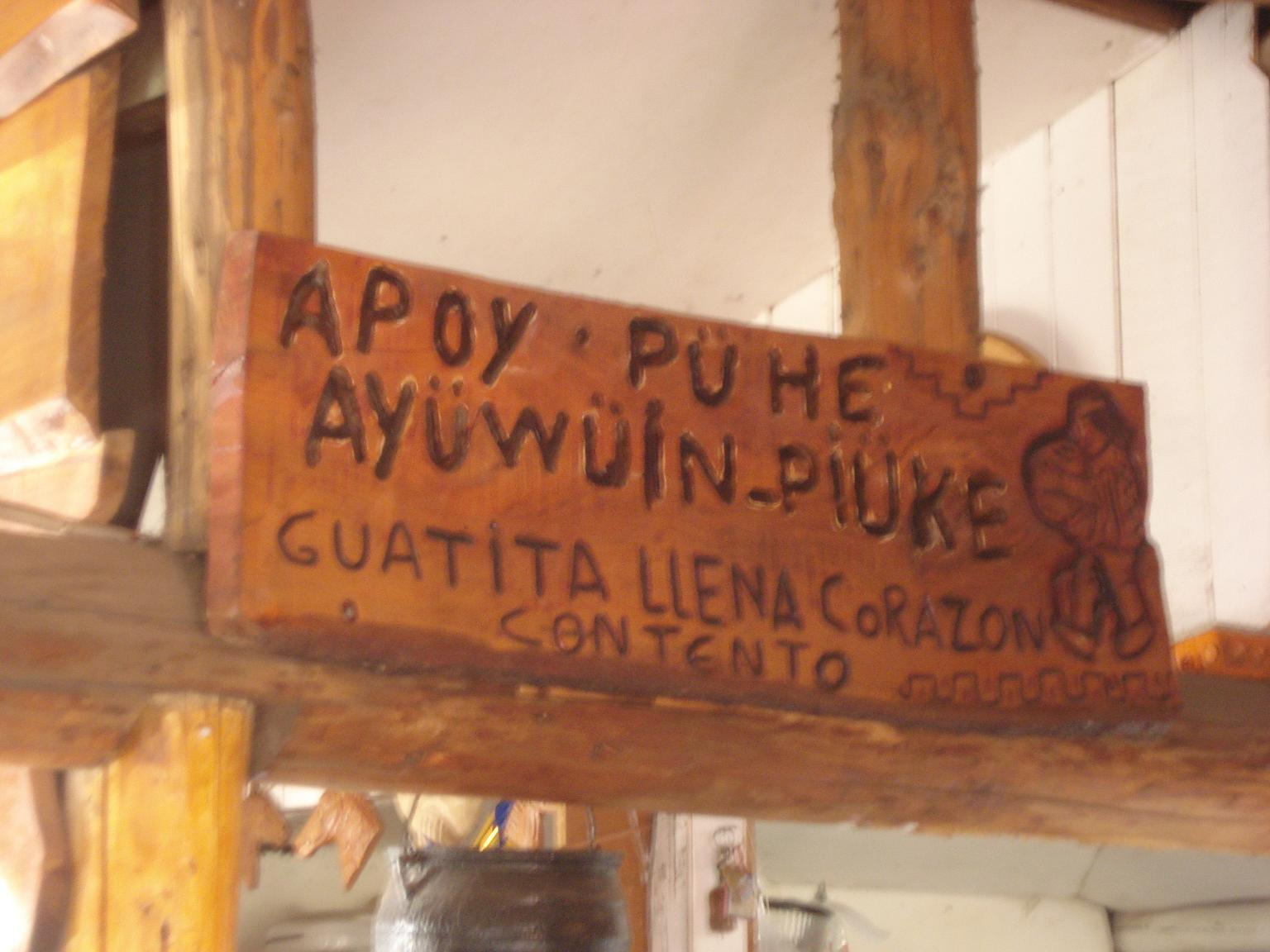
Chilean proverb written in Mapuche and Chilean Spanish. The Mapudungun alphabet used here does not reflect an agreed-upon standard. In fact, there are three distinct alphabets currently used to write the Mapuche language.

Names of the parts of the head in Mapudungun and Spanish

There is no consensus among experts regarding the relation between Mapuche and other indigenous languages of South America and it is classified as a language isolate, or more conservatively, an unclassified language while researchers await more definitive evidence linking it to other languages.

The origin of Mapuche is a historically debated topic and hypotheses have changed over time. In a 1970 publication, Stark argued that Mapuche is related to Mayan languages of Mesoamerica. The following year, Hamp adopted this same hypothesis. Stark later argued in 1973 that Mapuche descended from a language known as 'Yucha' which is a sister of Proto-Mayan language and a predecessor of the Chimuan languages, which hail from the northern coast of Peru, and Uru-Chipaya (Uruquilla and Chipaya) languages, which are spoken by those who currently inhabit the islands of Lake Titicaca and peoples living in Oruro Department in Bolivia, respectively. This hypothesis was later rejected by Campbell in the same year.

The research carried out by Mary R. Key in 1978 considered Mapuche to be related to other languages of Chile: specifically Kawésgar language and Yagán language which were both spoken by nomadic canoer communities from the Zona Austral and also with Chonan languages of Patagonia, some of which are now extinct. However, according to Key, there is a closer relation still between Mapuche and the Pano-Tacanan languages from Bolivia and Peru, a connection also made by Loos in 1973. Key also argued that there is a link to two Bolivian language isolates: the Mosetén and Yuracaré languages.

In 1987, Joseph Greenberg, a linguist from the United States, proposed a system of classification of the many indigenous languages of the Americas in which the Amerindian language family would include the large majority of languages found on the South American continent, which were formerly grouped in distinct families. The only families that fell outside of his framework were the Eskimo–Aleut languages and Na-Dene languages. According to this classification, Mapuche would be considered part of the Andean language family, within the Meridional subgroup which also includes the Kawésgar language, the Puelche language, the Tehuelche language and the Yagán language. To Greenberg, Araucano is not an individual language, but rather a subgroup composed of four languages: Araucano, Mapuche, Moluche, and Pehuenche. However, the comparative methods employed by Greenberg are controversial. In 1994, Viegas Barros directly contradicted Greenberg's hypothesis and part of Key's, arguing that a connection between the Merindonal subgroup mentioned above and the Mapuche language does not exist. Current linguists reject Greenberg's findings due to methodological concerns and opt instead for more conservative methods of classification. Moreover, many linguists do not accept the existence of an Amerindian language family due to the lack of available information needed to confirm it.

Other authorities such as SIL International classify Mapuche as one of the two languages that form that Araucana family along with Huilliche. However, most current linguists maintain a more conservative stance, classifying Mapuche as a language that remains separated from other indigenous languages of South America while its differences and similarities to them are being studied.

== History ==
=== Prehistory ===
Moulian et al. (2015) argue that the Puquina language influenced Mapudungun long before the rise of the Inca Empire. The influence of Puquina is thought to be the reason for the existence of Mapuche-Aymara-Quechua cognates. The following Pre-Incan cognates have been identified by Moulian et al.: sun (Mapudungun: antü, Quechua: inti), moon (Mapudungun: küllen, Quechua: killa), warlock (Mapudungun: kalku, Quechua: kawchu), salt (Mapudungun: chadi, Quechua: cachi) and mother (Mapudungun: ñuque, Quechua: ñuñu). This areal linguistic influence may have arrived with a migratory wave arising from the collapse of the Tiwanaku Empire around 1000 CE.

There is a more recent lexical influence from the Quechuan languages (pataka 'hundred', warangka 'thousand'), associated with the Inca Empire, and from Spanish.

As result of Inca rule, there was some Mapudungun–Imperial Quechua bilingualism among the Mapuches of Aconcagua Valley at the time of the arrival of the Spanish in the 1530s and 1540s.

The discovery of many Chono toponyms in Chiloé Archipelago, where Huilliche, a language closely related to Mapudungun, has been dominant, suggest that Mapudungun displaced Chono there prior to the arrival of the Spanish in the mid-16th century. A theory postulated by chronicler José Pérez García holds that the Cuncos settled in Chiloé Island in Pre-Hispanic times as consequence of a push from more northern Huilliches, who in turn were being displaced by Mapuches.

According to Ramírez "more than a dozen Mapuche – Rapa Nui cognates have been described". Among these are the Mapuche/Rapa Nui words toki/toki (axe), kuri/uri (black) and piti/iti (little).

=== Spanish–Mapuche bilingualism in colonial times ===
As the 16th and 17th century Central Chile was becoming a melting pot for uprooted indigenous peoples, it has been argued that Mapuche, Quechua and Spanish coexisted there, with significant bilingualism, during the 17th century. However the indigenous language that has influenced Chilean Spanish the most is Quechua rather than Mapuche.

In colonial times, many Spanish and Mestizos spoke the Mapuche language. For example, in the 17th century, many soldiers at the Valdivian Fort System had some command of Mapuche.

During the 17th and 18th centuries, most of Chiloé Archipelago's population was bilingual, and according to John Byron, many Spaniards preferred to use the local Huilliche language because they considered it "more beautiful". Around the same time, Governor Narciso de Santa María complained that Spanish settlers in the islands could not speak Spanish properly, but could speak Veliche, and that this second language was more used.

=== Further decline ===
Mapudungun was once the main language spoken in central Chile. The sociolinguistic situation of the Mapuche has changed rapidly. Now, nearly all of Mapuche people are bilingual or monolingual in Spanish. The degree of bilingualism depends on the community, participation in Chilean society, and the individual's choice towards the traditional or modern/urban way of life.

== Revitalization ==
The Chilean Ministry of Education created the Office of Intercultural Bilingual Education in 1996 in an attempt to include indigenous language in education. By 2004, there were still no programs in public schools in Santiago, despite the fact that 50% of the country’s Mapuche population resides in and around the area of Santiago. 30.4% of Mapuche students never graduate eighth grade and they have high rates of poverty. Most language revitalization efforts have been in rural communities and these efforts have been received in different ways by the Mapuche population: Ortiz says some feel that teaching Mapudungu in schools will set their children behind other Chileans, which reveals that their culture has been devalued by the Chilean government for so long that, unfortunately, some Mapuche people have come to see their language as worthless, too, which is a direct and lasting impact of colonization. Despite the absence of Mapudungun instruction in public schools, there are limited language course offerings at select Chilean universities, such as Pontifical Catholic University of Chile.

== Dialects ==
Dialect sub-groups

- - - - - I
        - II
    - - - III
        - IV
      - - V
        - VI
        - VII
  - VIII

Cladogram showing the closeness of Mapuche dialect sub-groups based on shared features according to Robert A. Croese. Dialect sub-groups are roughly ordered from their geographical distribution from north to south.

Linguist Robert A. Croese divides Mapudungun into eight dialectal sub-groups (I-VIII). Sub-group I is centered in Arauco Province, Sub-group II is the dialect of Angol, Los Ángeles and the middle and lower Bío Bío River. Sub-group III is centered around Purén. In the areas around Lonquimay, Melipeuco and Allipén River dialect sub-group IV is spoken. Sub-group V is spoken at the coast of Araucanía Region including Queule, Budi Lake and Toltén.

Temuco is the epicenter of the Mapuche territory today. Around Temuco, Freire and Gorbea the sub-group VI is spoken. Group VII is spoken in Valdivia Province plus Pucón and Curarrehue. The last "dialect" sub-group is VIII which is the Huilliche language spoken from Lago Ranco and Río Bueno to the south and is not mutually intelligible with the other dialects.

These can be grouped in four dialect groups: north, central, south-central and south. These are further divided into eight sub-groups: I and II (northern), III–IV (central), V-VII (south-central) and VIII (southern). The sub-groups III-VII are more closely related to each other than they are to I-II and VIII. Croese finds these relationships as consistent, but not proof, with the theory of origin of the Mapuche proposed by Ricardo E. Latcham.

The Mapudungun spoken in the Argentinian provinces of Neuquen and Río Negro is similar to that of the central dialect group in Chile, while the Ranquel (Rankülche) variety spoken in the Argentinian province of La Pampa is closer to the northern dialect group.

== Phonology ==
=== Prosody ===
Mapudungun has partially predictable, non-contrastive stress and there is no phonemic tone. The stressed syllable is generally the last one if it is closed (awkán 'game', tralkán 'thunder'), and the penultimate one if the last one is open (lóngko 'head'). In two-syllable words, for example, when both syllables are open (ending in a vowel) or both are closed (ending in a consonant), the accent falls on the final syllable. In the case that only one of the two is open, the accent falls on the closed syllable.

Example

iñchiñ 'we'
ruká 'house'

With words that have more than two syllables and have the final two either open or closed, the accent falls on the penultimate syllable. If only one of the two is closed, that one receives the accent.

Example

williche 'Huilliche language'
pichiwentru 'boy'
warangka 'thousand'
mapudungun 'Mapuche language'.

=== Vowels ===
Stressed monophthongs of Mapudungun, from Sadowsky et al. (2013:92)

Vowel phonemes
	Front	Central	Back
Close	ɪ		ʊ
Mid	e	ɘ	o
Open		ɐ	

- Sadowsky et al. transcribe the vowels with ⟨ɪ, ɘ, ʊ, ë, ö, ɐ̝⟩. Although other sources may follow the traditional transcription ⟨i, ɨ, u, e, o, a⟩.
- In stressed syllables, /ɪ, ʊ/ are near-close [ɪ, ʊ], whereas the mid-/e, o/ are centralized close-mid [ë, ö]. The open vowel is realized as a raised open central [ɐ], making it sound closer to [ɜ] than to [ä]. Unstressed vowels are more close [i, u, ɪ, ʊ, ə] (though unstressed /e, o/ are still somewhat more open than stressed /ɪ, ʊ/). Utterance-final unstressed vowels are generally devoiced or even elided when they occur after voiceless consonants, sometimes even after voiced consonants.
- Traditionally, /ɘ/ has been described as a close central vowel with an unstressed mid-central allophone. According to Sadowsky et al., the vowel is close-mid [ɘ] when stressed and near-close [ɨ̞] when unstressed, patterning phonetically with the mid-series.

=== Consonants ===
Mapudungun consonant phonemes
		Labial	Dental	Alveolar	Postalveolar	Retroflex	Palatal	Velar
Nasal		m	(n̪)	n			ɲ	ŋ
Stop		p	(t̪)	t	tʃ	ʈʂ		k
Fricative		f	θ	s	ʃ			ɣ
Approximant	median					ɻ	j	w
Approximant	lateral		(l̪)	l			ʎ	

- /m, p/ are bilabial, whereas /f/ is labiodental.
- The dental series /n̪, t̪, l̪/ is phonetically interdental and occurs only in some dialects.
- Utterance-final coronal laterals /l̪, l/ may be devoiced and fricated: [ɬ̪, ɬ].
- The plosives may be aspirated. It is often the case with the main allophone of /k/ ([k]). Its fronted allophone [c] is less frequently aspirated, as is the alveolar /t/. When it comes to the dental /t̪/ as well as the bilabial /p/, aspiration is even rarer. For stops, voicing is not a distinctive feature, as well as aspiration.
- Some speakers realize /ʈʂ/ as apical postalveolar, either an affricate or an aspirated plosive.
- /ɻ/ has been traditionally classified as an approximant; however, Sadowsky et al. prefer to classify it as a fricative [ʐ] as that is the predominant variant in their sample. Other possible variants include a lateral approximant [ɭ] and, in post-nuclear position, a voiceless fricative [ʂ].
- /j/ may be realized with frication: [ʝ].
- Among the velar consonants, /w/ is labialized. Before front vowels, /ŋ, k, ɣ/ are fronted to [ŋ˖, c, ɣ˖~ʝ].

== Orthography ==
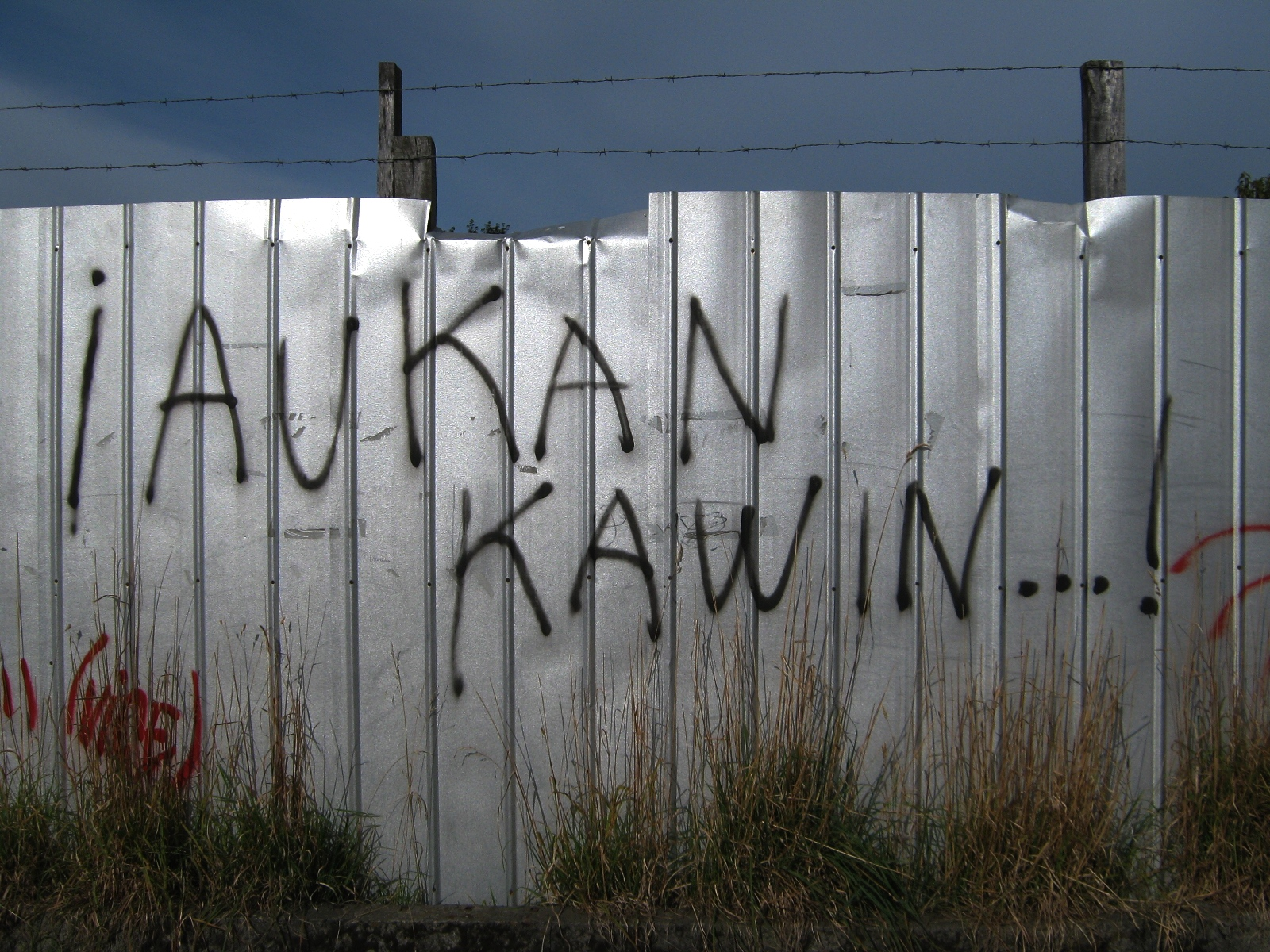
Graffiti in Mapudungun meaning "Uprise Meeting...!"

The Mapuche had no writing system before the Spanish arrived, but the language is now written with the Latin script. Although the orthography used in this article is based on the Alfabeto Mapuche Unificado, the system used by Chilean linguists and other people in many publications in the language, the competing Ragileo, Nhewenh and Azumchefi systems all have their supporters, and there is still no consensus among authorities, linguists and Mapuche communities. The same word can look very different in each system, with the word for "conversation or story" being written either gvxam, gytram, or ngütram, for example.

=== Microsoft legal threats ===
In late 2006, Mapuche leaders threatened to sue Microsoft when the latter completed a translation of their Windows operating system into Mapudungun. They claimed that Microsoft needed permission to do so and had not sought it. The event can be seen in the light of the greater political struggle concerning the alphabet that should become the standard alphabet of the Mapuche people.

== Morphology ==
- Mapuche is an agglutinative language. The word order of Mapudungun is flexible, but a topic–comment construction is common. The subject (agent) of a transitive clause tends to precede the verb, and the object tends to follow (A–V–O order); the subject of an intransitive clause tends to follow the verb (V–S order).
- Nouns are grouped in two classes, animate and inanimate. For example, pu is a plural indicator for animate nouns and yuka as the plural for inanimate nouns. Chi (or ti) can be used as a definite animate article, as in chi wentru 'the man' and chi pu wentru for 'the men'. The number kiñe 'one' serves as an indefinite article. Subjects and objects use the same case.
- Mapudungun uses particles, which is a small group of morphemes that enable the speaker to express how they feel about what they have said. Examples include chi (doubt), am (surprise), nga (regret), llemay (certainty), chemay (amazement), chiam (wonder), amfe (exclamation). There are also more complicated particles such as kay, which suggest the information about to be said is in contrast to what was just said. Another complex particle is may, which is used when the speaker expects to get a positive reaction from what they are saying. One particle, anchi, refers to the subject of the sentence, and an example would be "chem anchi?" which translates to what [is] that (pointed out)?
- "An inflection can be added to a noun with -mew or -mu. This suffix can refer to time, place, cause or comparison. "An example of this is the sentence

Mesa-mew müle-y ti mamüllü ñi müle-n mi tukupu-a-l.
table-LOC be-IND/3S.SBJ the wood POSS be-NOML 2S.POSS use-NRLD-NOML
‘On the table is the wood that you should use.’

- Numbers from 1 to 10 are as follows: 1 kiñe, 2 epu, 3 küla, 4 meli, 5 kechu, 6 kayu, 7 regle, 8 pura, 9 aylla, 10 mari; further numbers include 20 epu mari, 30 küla mari, 110 (kiñe) pataka mari. Numbers are extremely regular in formation, which is comparable to Chinese and Wolof. Mapuche is a polysynthetic language with noun incorporation and root composition. Broadly speaking this means that words are formed by morpheme agglutination of lexical elements to the extent that a single word can require a translation that produces a complete sentence.

trari- mansun- pa- rke- la- (y)- a- y- ngu
SURROUND- ox- CIS- SURPRISE- NEG- (E)- FUT- IND- {3DU}
'Those two won't yoke the oxen here!'

=== Pronouns ===
- There are, for personal pronouns, three persons and three numbers:

		Number
		Singular	Dual	Plural
Person	First	iñche, 'I'	iñchiw, 'we (2)'	iñchiñ, 'we (more than 2)'
Person	Second	eymi, 'you'	eymu, 'you (2)'	eymün, 'you (more than 2)'
Person	Third	fey, 'he/she/it'	feyengu, 'they (2)'	feyengün, 'they (more than 2)'

- Possessive pronouns are related to the personal forms: ñi 'my; his, her; their', yu 'our (2)', iñ 'our (more than 2)'; mi 'your', mu 'your (2)', mün 'your (more than 2)'. They are often found with a particle ta, which does not seem to add anything specific to the meaning: tami 'your'.
- Interrogative pronouns include iney 'who', chem 'what', chumül 'when', chew 'where', chum(ngechi) 'how' and chumngelu 'why'.

=== Verbs ===
- Most complex verb formations in Mapudungun are constructed with five or six morphemes.
- Verbs can be finite or non-finite (non-finite endings: -n, -el, -etew, -lu, -am, etc.), are intransitive or transitive and are conjugated according to person (first, second and third), number (singular, dual and plural), voice (active, agentless passive and reflexive-reciprocal, plus two applicatives) and mood (indicative, imperative and subjunctive). In the indicative, the present (zero) and future (-(y)a) tenses are distinguished. There are a number of aspects: the progressive, resultative and habitual are well established; some forms that seem to mark some subtype of perfect are also found. Other verb morphology includes an evidential marker (reportative-mirative), directionals (cislocative, translocative, andative and ambulative, plus an interruptive and continuous action marker) and modal markers (sudden action, faked action, immediate action, etc.). There is productive noun incorporation, and the case can be made for root compounding morphology.
- "Spanish loan verbs have generally been adapted into Mapudungu in the third person singular form. An example is the Mapudungu verb for "to be able" is "pwede", and the Spanish translation for "he can" is "puede".

The indicative present paradigm for an intransitive verb like konün 'enter' is as follows:

		Number
		Singular	Dual	Plural
Person	First	konün ( ← kon-n)	koniyu ( ← kon-i-i-u)	koniyiñ ( ← kon-i-i-n)
Person	Second	konimi ( ← kon-i-m-i)	konimu ( ← kon-i-m-u)	konimün ( ← kon-i-m-n)
Person	Third	koni ( ← kon-i-0-0)	koningu ( ← kon-i-ng-u)	koningün ( ← kon-i-ng-n)

What some authors have described as an inverse system (similar to the ones described for Algonquian languages) can be seen from the forms of a transitive verb like pen 'see'. The 'intransitive' forms are the following:

		Number
		Singular	Dual	Plural
Person	First	pen ( ← pe-n)	peyu ( ← pe-i-i-u)	peiñ ( ← pe-i-i-n)
Person	Second	peymi ( ← pe-i-m-i)	peymu ( ← pe-i-m-u)	peymün ( ← pe-i-m-n)
Person	Third	pey ( ← pe-i-0-0)	peyngu ( ← pe-i-ng-u)	peyngün ( ← pe-i-ng-n)

The 'transitive' forms are the following (only singular forms are provided here):

		Agent
		First	Second	Third
Patient	First	pewün ( ← pe-w-n)	peen ( ← pe-e-n)	peenew ( ← pe-e-n-mew)
Patient	Second	peeyu ( ← pe-e-i-u)	pewimu ( ← pe-w-i-m-u)	peeymew ( ← pe-e-i-m-i-mew)
Patient	Third	pefiñ ( ← pe-fi-n)	pefimi ( ← pe-fi-i-m-i)	DIR pefi ( ← pe-fi-i-0-0)
Patient	Third	pefiñ ( ← pe-fi-n)	pefimi ( ← pe-fi-i-m-i)	INV peeyew ( ← pe-e-i-0-0-mew)
Patient	Third	pefiñ ( ← pe-fi-n)	pefimi ( ← pe-fi-i-m-i)	REFL pewi ( ← pe-w-i-0-0)

When a third person interacts with a first or second person, the forms are direct (without -e) or inverse (with -e); the speaker has no choice. When two third persons interact, two different forms are available. The direct form (pefi) is appropriate when the agent is topical (the central figure in that particular passage). By contrast, the inverse form (peenew) is appropriate when the patient is topical. Thus, chi wentru pefi chi domo means 'the man saw the woman', while chi wentru peeyew chi domo means something like 'the man was seen by the woman'. However, it is not a passive construction; the passive would be chi wentru pengey 'the man was seen/someone saw the man'. Therefore, a better translation may be 'it was the woman who saw the man' or 'the woman was the one who saw the man'.

== Studies ==
=== Older works ===
The formalization and normalization of Mapudungun was effected by the first Mapudungun grammar published by the Jesuit priest Luis de Valdivia in 1606 (Arte y Gramatica General de la Lengva que Corre en Todo el Reyno de Chile). More important is the Arte de la Lengua General del Reyno de Chile by the Jesuit Andrés Fabrés (1765, Lima) composed of a grammar and dictionary. In 1776 three volumes in Latin were published in Westphalia (Chilidúgú sive Res Chilenses) by the German Jesuit Bernhard Havestadt.

The work by Febrés was used as a basic preparation from 1810 for missionary priests going into the regions occupied by the Mapuche people. A corrected version was completed in 1846 and a summary, without a dictionary in 1864.

A work based on Febrés' book is the Breve Metodo della Lingua Araucana y Dizionario Italo-Araucano e Viceversa by the Italian Octaviano de Niza in 1888. It was destroyed in a fire at the Convento de San Francisco in Valdivia in 1928.

=== Modern works ===
The most comprehensive works to date are the ones by Augusta (1903, 1916). Salas (1992, 2006) is an introduction for non-specialists, featuring an ethnographic introduction and a valuable text collection as well. Zúñiga (2006) includes a complete grammatical description, a bilingual dictionary, some texts and an audio CD with text recordings (educational material, a traditional folktale and six contemporary poems). Smeets (1989) and Zúñiga (2000) are for specialists only. Fernández-Garay (2005) introduces both the language and the culture. Catrileo (1995) and the dictionaries by Hernández & Ramos are trilingual (Spanish, English and Mapudungun).

==== Bibliography ====
- Gramática mapuche bilingüe, by Félix José de Augusta, Santiago, 1903. [1990 reprint by Séneca, Santiago.]
- Idioma mapuche, by Ernesto Wilhelm de Moesbach, Padre Las Casas, Chile: San Francisco, 1962.
- El mapuche o araucano. Fonología, gramática y antología de cuentos, by Adalberto Salas, Madrid: MAPFRE, 1992.
- El mapuche o araucano. Fonología, gramática y antología de cuentos, by Adalberto Salas, edited by Fernando Zúñiga, Santiago: Centro de Estudios Públicos, 2006. [2nd (revised) edition of Salas 1992.] ISBN 956-7015-41-4
- A Mapuche grammar, by Ineke Smeets, Ph.D. dissertation, Leiden University, 1989.
- Mapudungun, by Fernando Zúñiga, Munich: Lincom Europa, 2000. ISBN 3-89586-976-7
- Parlons Mapuche: La langue des Araucans, by Ana Fernández-Garay. Editions L'Harmattan, 2005, ISBN 2-7475-9237-5
- Mapudungun: El habla mapuche. Introducción a la lengua mapuche, con notas comparativas y un CD, by Fernando Zúñiga, Santiago: Centro de Estudios Públicos, 2006. ISBN 956-7015-40-6
- A Grammar of Mapuche, by Ineke Smeets. Berlin / New York: Mouton de Gruyter, 2008. ISBN 978-3-11-019558-3

===== Dictionaries =====
- Félix José de Augusta, Diccionario araucano, Santiago de Chile: Imprenta Universitaria, 1916 (Tomo primero; Tomo segundo) [1996 reprint by Cerro Manquehue, Santiago.] ISBN 956-7210-17-9*
- María Catrileo, Diccionario lingüístico-etnográfico de la lengua mapuche. Mapudungun-español-English, Santiago: Andrés Bello, 1995.
- Esteban Erize, Diccionario comentado mapuche-español, Bahía Blanca: Yepun, 1960.
- Ana Fernández Garay, Ranquel-español/español-ranquel. Diccionario de una variedad mapuche de la Pampa (Argentina), Leiden: CNWS (Leiden University), 2001. ISBN 90-5789-058-5
- Arturo Hernández and Nelly Ramos, Diccionario ilustrado mapudungun-español-inglés, Santiago: Pehuén, 1997.
- Arturo Hernández and Nelly Ramos, Mapuche: lengua y cultura. Mapudungun-español-inglés, Santiago: Pehuén, 2005. [5th (augmented) edition of their 1997 dictionary.]
- Muñoz Urrutia, Rafael, ed. (2006). Diccionario Mapuche: Mapudungun/Español, Español/Mapudungun (2ª edición). Santiago de Chile: Editorial Centro Gráfico Ltda. ISBN 956-8287-99-X.

===== Mapudungun language courses =====
- Mapudunguyu 1. Curso de lengua mapuche, by María Catrileo, Valdivia: Universidad Austral de Chile, 2002.
- Manual de aprendizaje del idioma mapuche: Aspectos morfológicos y sintácticos, by Bryan Harmelink, Temuco: Universidad de la Frontera, 1996. ISBN 956-236-077-6
- EH2518 Introducción a la lengua y cultura Mapuche, Santago Universidad de Chile, 2020.

== See also ==
- List of Mapudungun placenames
- María Catrileo

== Bibliography ==
- Aprueban alfabeto mapuche único (Oct 19, 1999). El Mercurio de Santiago.
- Campbell, Lyle (1997) American Indian languages: The historical linguistics of Native America. New York: Oxford University Press. ISBN 0-19-509427-1.
- Instituto Nacional de Estadística y Censos (2005) Encuesta Complementaria de Pueblos Indígenas (ECPI), 2004–2005 – Primeros resultados provisionales. Buenos Aires: INDEC. ISSN 0327-7968.
- Sadowsky, Scott; Painequeo, Héctor; Salamanca, Gastón; Avelino, Heriberto (2013), "Mapudungun", Journal of the International Phonetic Association, 43 (1): 87–96, doi:10.1017/S0025100312000369, ISSN 0025-1003, JSTOR 26351939
- Téllez, Eduardo (2008). Los Diaguitas: Estudios (in Spanish). Santiago, Chile: Ediciones Akhilleus. ISBN 978-956-8762-00-1.
