= Alfonso Toral Moreno =

Mexican short story writer, essayist, and proofreader (1914–2003)

- Born: 24 December 1914; Guadalajara, Jalisco, Mexico
- Died: 3 January 2003 (aged 88); Guadalajara, Jalisco, México
- Occupations: short story writer, essayist, and proofreader
- Spouse: Ana Rosa Ávila Zerecero
- Parents: Pascual María Toral Ruiz (physician and philologist) (father); Rosa Moreno Fonseca (mother)
- Relatives: José de León Toral (cousin)

Alfonso Toral Moreno (24 December 1914 – 3 January 2003) was a Mexican short story writer, essayist, and proofreader.

== Biography ==
Alfonso Toral Moreno was born in Guadalajara, Jalisco, Mexico, on 24 December 1914.

In the 1950s and 1960s he collaborated with stories and essays in the literary magazine Et Caetera, edited by Adalberto Navarro Sánchez.

From 1980 to 1 March 1983, he was the editorial advisor to the bimonthly literature magazine Summa, directed by Arturo Rivas Sainz.

According to literary critic and essayist Emmanuel Carballo, Toral's narrative texts were "well-intentioned and insipid."

Fond of coffee and café, in the 1940s and 1950s he was a regular at Café Apolo, then located at Avenida Juárez 401, corner with Galeana, in downtown Guadalajara, where he used to proofread galley proofs from the printing house of the University of Guadalajara. There he used to talk with Adalberto Navarro Sánchez and this one's wife, María Luisa Hidalgo, Alfredo Leal Cortés, Arturo Rivas Sainz, Salvador Echavarría, Ramón Rubín Rivas, Olivia Zúñiga, Lola Vidrio, and other writers. Years later, after the Apolo was permanently closed, he used to go to the Café Treve and the Café Madoka, also downtown.

In 1982, his wife Ana Rosa Ávila Zerecero (6 June 1929 – 7 October 1982) passed away.

Alfonso Toral was the first cousin of assassin José de León Toral, who on 17 July 1928, killed General Álvaro Obregón, re-elected president of Mexico.

=== Tribute to Agustín Yáñez ===
On the occasion of the centenary of the birth of the writer from Guadalajara Agustín Yáñez (1904–1980), author and cultural promoter Martín Almádez organized a diachronic tribute collected on 29 March 2004 in a page from the Arts section of the Guadalajaran newspaper El Informador. Toral declared that his envy of Agustín Yáñez because the latter's novel, The Creation, did not come from himself feeling like a novelist, since he was not. "With my apodictic rancorous phrase that finished off the mending I did on the novel, I did not think of any competition; I confessed my collapse on the rocks of my own incompetence".

=== Death ===
Alfonso Toral Moreno died in Guadalajara, Jalisco, on 3 January 2003, at the age of 88.

== Some of his works ==
- Uxor y otros uxores (short stories), Unidad Editorial (Uned) del Gobierno del Estado de Jalisco, Guadalajara, 1983, 110 pp.
- "Cafeína, nicotina y dialectina", essay included in Travesías de un café (Voyages of a café), Ediciones Treve, Guadalajara, 1990.
- La novela y el cuento como problema metafísico (essay), 1960.
- El toralazo, an extensive novel with autobiographical features, published in installments in the Guadalajaran daily newspaper El Occidental on Sundays from June 1990 to August 1991.

== See also ==
- Agustín Yáñez
