= Lucia Jaramillo =

Ecuadorian politician (born 1990)

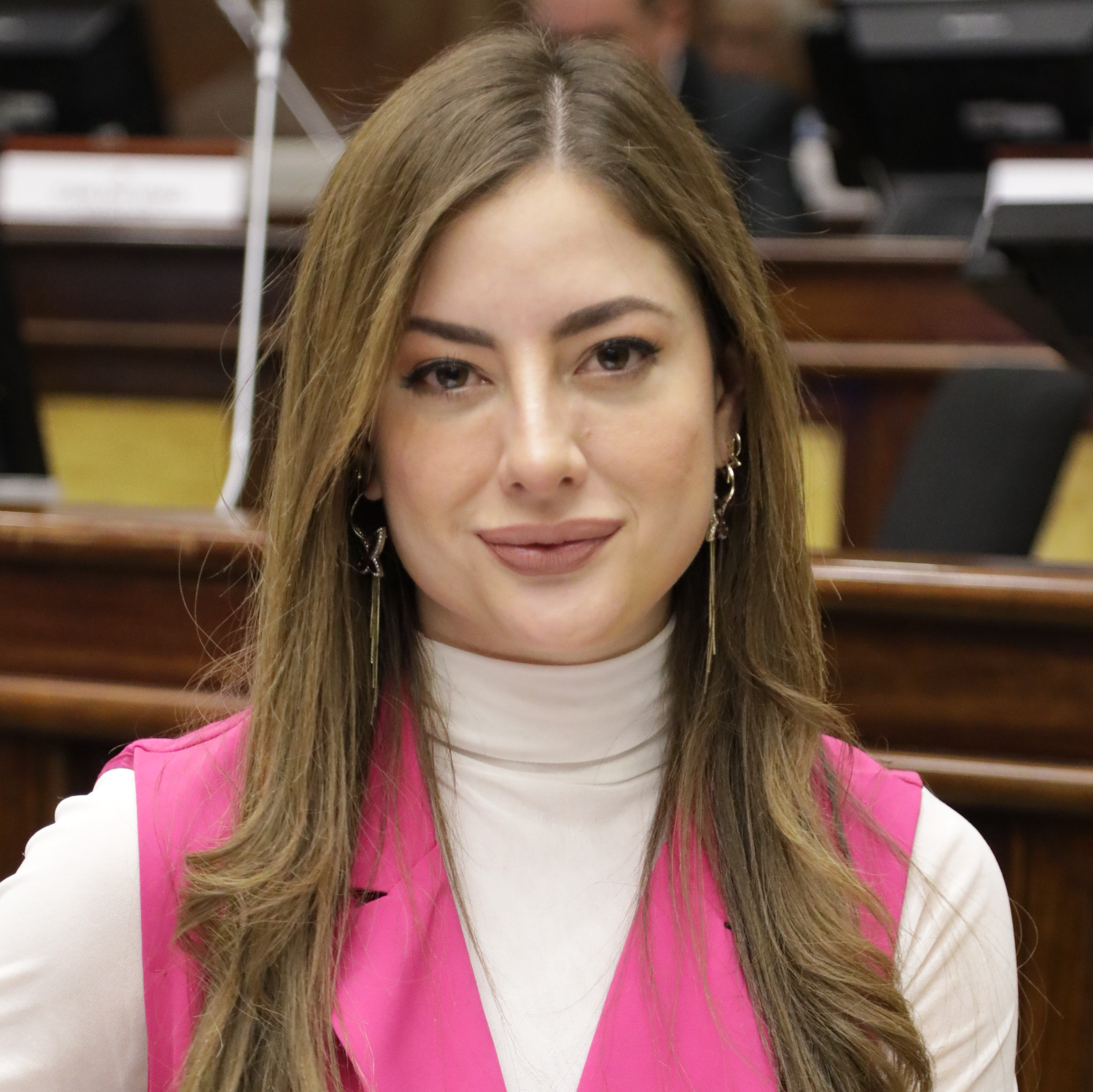
- Born: 29 July 1990 (age 35); Guayaquil
- Education: Catholic University of Santiago de Guayaquil.
- Occupation: politician
- Political party: Social Christian Party in 2023, later the National Democratic Action party.

Lucia Jaramillo or Lucía Lizbeth Jaramillo Zurita (born 29 July 1990) is an Ecuadorian politician in Ecuador's National Assembly. She went from a career in television to be elected in 2023 and again in 2025. She and her twin sister have had similar careers.

== Life ==
Jaramillo and her twin sister were born in 1990 in Guayaquil. She has a degree from the Catholic University of Santiago de Guayaquil. Like her twin sister Paola she initially worked in television. They both had parts in the TV series Súper Papá when they were teenagers.

She represents the Guayas province.

She was elected first in 2023 to the National Assembly as a member of the Social Christian Party. She was soon in trouble with her party after she abstained in a vote where her party asked her to vote against a proposal by Daniel Nobea's National Democratic Action party. Jaramillo was an active politician on social media and her official position changed to Independent as she increasingly supported Nobea.

In 2025 she was leading the Commission on International Relations and Human Mobility. Her deputy was Edwin Estuardo Jarrín Rivadeneira and other members included Sara Noemí Cabrera Chacón, Arisdely Paola Parrales Yagual, Ledy Andrea Zuñiga Rocha, Doménica Carolina Escobar Galarza, Graciela Janeth Ramírez Chalán and Bertha Betsabé Vélez Vélez.
