= Jory (surname) =

Jory is a surname.

- Arturo Zúñiga Jory (born 1982), Chilean politician
- Herbert Jory (1888–1966), South Australian architect
- Jon Jory, American theatrical director
- Percy Jory (1888–?), Australian rules footballer and umpire
- Peter Jory (born 1974), British sport shooter
- Rex Jory, Australian journalist
- Rodney Jory (1938–2021), Australian physicist
- Sarah Jory (born 1969), English musician and vocalist
- Victor Jory (1902–1982), Canadian-born American actor
