= María Catrileo =

Mapuche linguist (born 1944)

María Catrileo Chiguailaf de Codo (born 1944 in Nueva Imperial) is a native Mapuche linguist and professor of Spanish, English and Mapudungun language.

Catrileo grew up in the Mapuche community of Rangintulewfü, Boroa, Nueva Imperial. Obtaining her basic education in the community, she finished school at the Liceo de Niñas Gabriela Mistral in La Serena. Afterward, she obtained her Master of Arts in linguistics at the University of Texas at Austin with a Fulbright grant. She married a Yoruba man from Nigeria, with whom she had Anail Rayén, and taught English and Mapudungun linguistics at the Austral University of Chile. In 1980, she began working on the Diccionario lingüístico-etnográfico de la lengua mapuche, which was published in 1995.

In the late 1990s, she was a volunteer host of Wixage anai!, a Santiago-based Mapuche radio program that first aired on 26 June 1993.

In 2009, Catrileo received the Provincial Prize for Conservation of National Monuments for her studies of the native Mapudungun language. Catrileo's work has focused on the phonology and morpho-syntax of the Mapudungun language and specially the verb forms. She is considered to be perhaps the only living Mapuche Indian to be a master of Spanish, English and Mapudungun. Currently, she is working at the Institute of Linguistics and Literature of the Austral University of Chile, where she holds courses in Mapudungun.

== Books ==
- Mapudunguyu: curso de lengua mapuche. Valdivia: Universidad Austral de Chile. 1988. OCLC 22154648.
- Diccionario lingüístico-etnográfico de la lengua mapuche: mapudungun-Español-English (1. ed.). Santiago: Editorial Andrés Bello. 1995. ISBN 978-9561-3133-61. OCLC 34878976.
- La lengua mapuche en el siglo XXI. Valdivia: Universidad Austral de Chile. 2010. ISBN 978-9563-3227-12. OCLC 1318507317.
