= Arturo Zúñiga =

Chilean politician

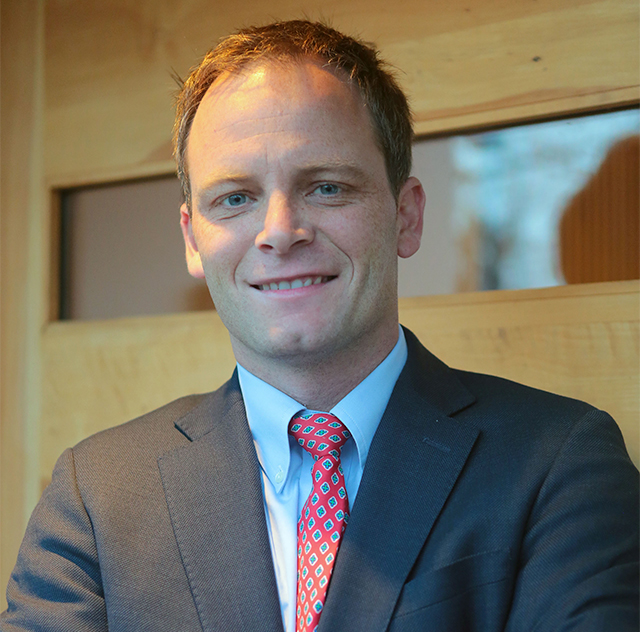
- Official portrait, 2019

Member of the Constitutional Convention
- In office 4 July 2021 – 4 July 2022
- Constituency: 9th District

Undersecretary of Assistance Networks
- In office 11 July 2019 – 3 November 2020
- President: Sebastián Piñera
- Preceded by: Luis Castillo Fuenzalida
- Succeeded by: Alberto Dougnac

Personal details
- Born: 1 December 1982 (age 43) Santiago, Chile
- Party: Independent
- Education: Pontifical Catholic University of Chile

Arturo Zúñiga Jory (Note: In this Chilean name, the first or paternal surname is Zúñiga and the second or maternal family name is Jory.) (born 1 December 1982) is a Chilean commercial engineer and politician affiliated with the Independent Democratic Union (UDI). He served as a member of the Constitutional Convention of Chile representing District 9 of the Metropolitan Region of Santiago.

He previously served as Undersecretary of Healthcare Networks at the Ministry of Health between 2019 and 2020, during the second administration of President Sebastián Piñera.

== Early life and education ==
Zúñiga Jory was born on 1 December 1982 in Santiago. He is the son of Luis Zúñiga Escala and Adriana Jory Guzmán. He is married to María de la Luz Errázuriz Almarza.

He completed his primary and secondary education at Colegio de los Sagrados Corazones de Vitacura, graduating in 2000. He later pursued higher education at the Pontifical Catholic University of Chile, where he studied commercial engineering.

== Professional career ==
Zúñiga Jory worked as Director of Health for the Municipality of Panguipulli.

== Political career ==
He is a member of the Independent Democratic Union (UDI). During the first administration of President Sebastián Piñera, he served as Chief of Staff to the Minister of Health Jaime Mañalich.

In July 2019, he was appointed Undersecretary of Healthcare Networks at the Ministry of Health, a position he held until November 2020, when he resigned to run for a seat in the Constitutional Convention.

In the elections held on 15 and 16 May 2021, Zúñiga Jory ran as a candidate for the Constitutional Convention representing District 9 of the Metropolitan Region, on behalf of the UDI within the Vamos por Chile electoral pact. He obtained 11,571 votes, corresponding to 3.65% of the valid votes cast.
