= Sara Cabrera =

Ecuadorian politician

Sara Noemi Cabrera
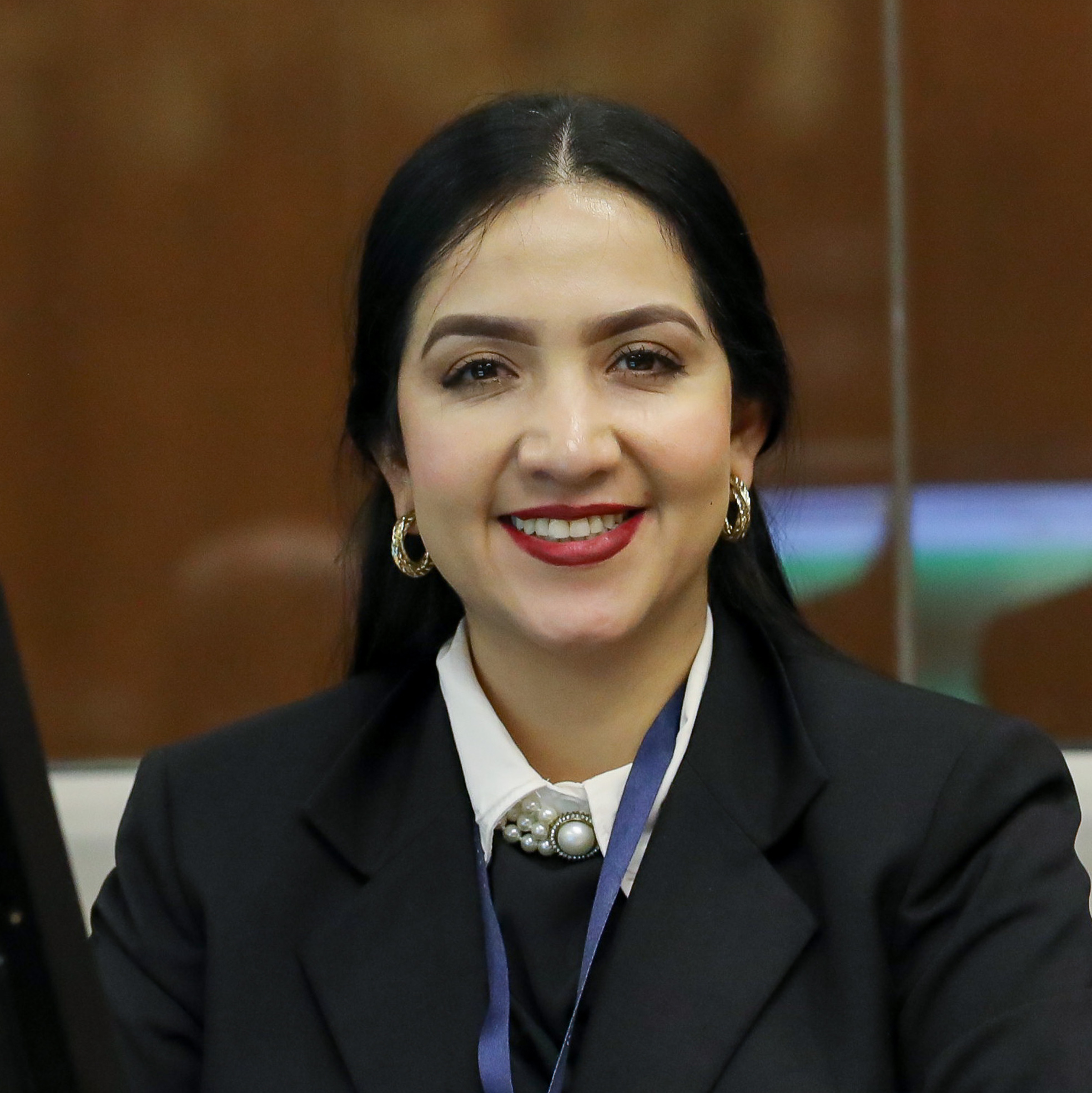
- in 2022
- Born: c. 1988; Pasaje, Ecuador
- Occupation: politician
- Known for: represents the Province of El Oro in the National Assembly
- Political party: Citizen Revolution Political Movement

Sara Noemi Cabrera Chacon (born c. 1988) is an Ecuadorian politician. She is a member of the Citizen Revolution Political Movement and she represents the Province of El Oro in the National Assembly.

== Life ==
She was born about 1988 and she comes from the city of Pasaje in the Province of El Oro. She trained as a psychologist.

She was an alternate member in 2021, and she became a full member of the National Assembly in 2022.

In 2025, she was re-elected to the National Assembly to serve until 2029. She is a member of the Citizen Revolution Political Movement and she represents the Province of El Oro. She has a team of four people and an alternate.

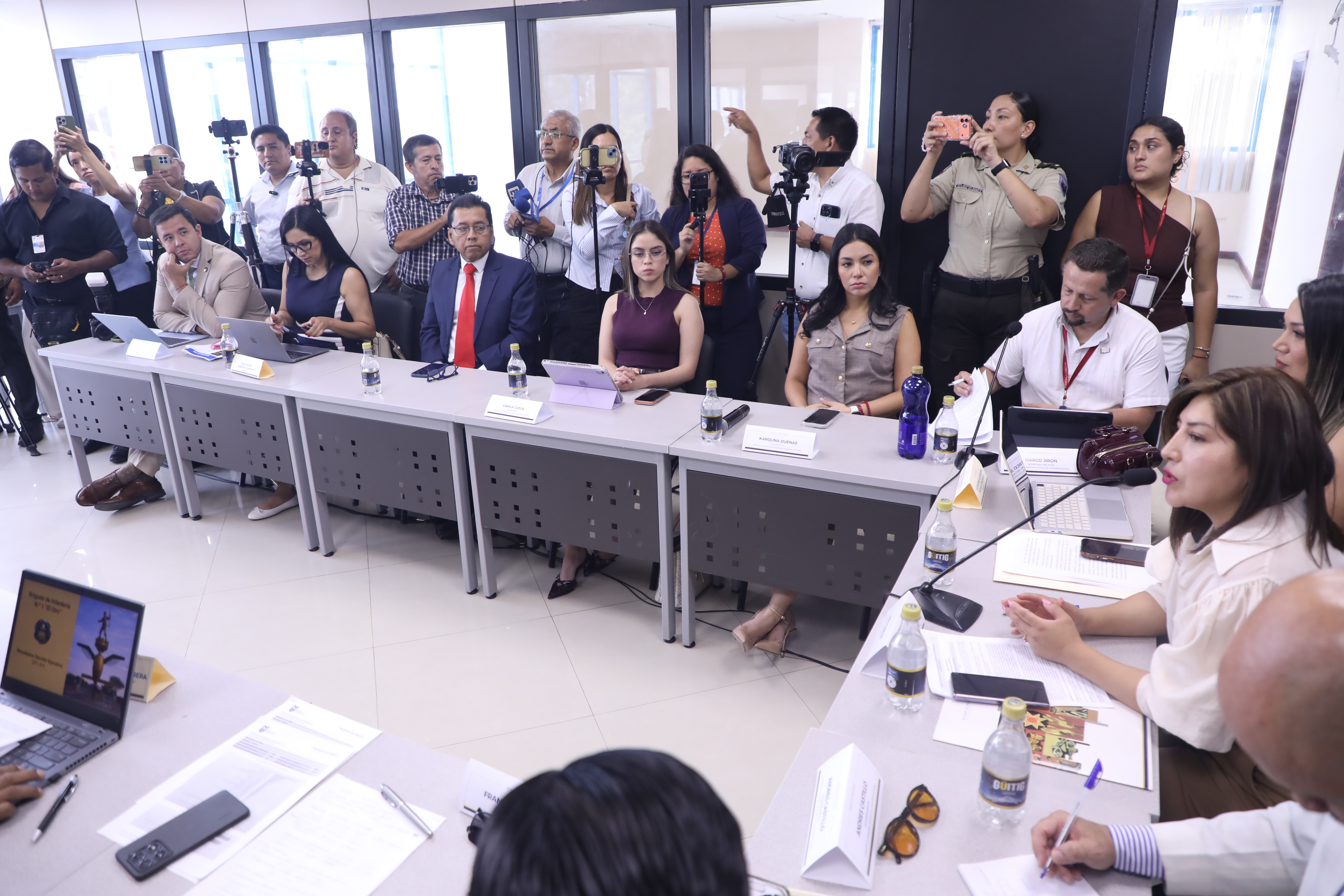
left to right: two men, Sara Cabrera, unknown, Camila Cueva, Karolina Duenas, unknown and in front Inés Alarcón.

She joined the Assembly's Commission on International Relations and Human Mobility. It was led by Lucia Jaramillo with Edwin Estuardo Jarrín Rivadeneira as her duputy. Other members included Ledy Zúñiga, Arisdely Paola Parrales Yagual, Doménica Carolina Escobar Galarza, Graciela Janeth Ramírez Chalán and Bertha Betsabé Vélez Vélez. However she attended the Integrated Security Commission in March 2026.
