= Sonia Cristofaro =

Linguist

Sonia Cristofaro is a linguist at Sorbonne University who specializes in linguistic typology and subordination.

== Education, career and honours ==
Cristofaro studied for an MA in linguistics at the University of Pavia, graduating in 1993. After periods studying at the University of Manchester and the Free University of Berlin, she returned to Pavia for her doctorate, awarded in 1998.

In 1999 Cristofaro left Pavia to take up a position as assistant professor at the University of Verona, but shortly after returned to Pavia as associate professor, where she remained until 2020. She is currently full professor of linguistics in the Faculty of Letters at the Sorbonne University.

In 2021 Cristofaro was elected ordinary member of the Academia Europaea.

== Research ==
Cristofaro is well known for her work on linguistic subordination; her 2003 monograph on the topic has been cited over a thousand times. In the volume, Cristofaro departs from traditional approaches by adopting a non-structural definition of subordination, characterized in terms of a cognitive asymmetry between two states of affairs; she also establishes a number of implicational hierarchies for subordination types.

Cristofaro's work takes a functionalist perspective on linguistic typology. Her more recent work has focused on the extent to which linguistic universals and typological generalizations can be explained diachronically, in terms of common patterns of language change such as grammaticalization.

== Selected publications ==
- Cristofaro, Sonia. 2003. Subordination. Oxford: Oxford University Press. ISBN 9780199282005
- Cristofaro, Sonia. 2007. Deconstructing categories: Finiteness in a functional-typological perspective. In Irina Nikolaeva (ed.), Finiteness: Theoretical and Empirical Foundations, 91–114. Oxford: Oxford University Press. ISBN 9780199213733
- Cristofaro, Sonia. 2012. Descriptive notions vs. grammatical categories: Unrealized states of affairs and ‘irrealis’. Language Sciences 34 (2), 131–146. doi:10.1016/j.langsci.2011.08.001
- Cristofaro, Sonia. 2013. The referential hierarchy: reviewing the evidence in diachronic perspective. In Dik Bakker and Martin Haspelmath (eds.), Languages Across Boundaries: Studies in Memory of Anna Siewierska, 69–94. Berlin: Mouton de Gruyter. doi:10.1515/9783110331127.69
- Cristofaro, Sonia. 2019. Taking diachronic evidence seriously: Result-oriented vs. source-oriented explanations of typological universals. In Karsten Schmidtke-Bode, Natalia Levshina, Susanne Maria Michaelis & Ilja A. Seržant (eds.), Explanation in typology: Diachronic sources, functional motivations and the nature of the evidence, 25–46. Berlin: Language Science Press. doi:10.5281/zenodo.2583806
