= Ledy Zúñiga =

Ecuadorian politician

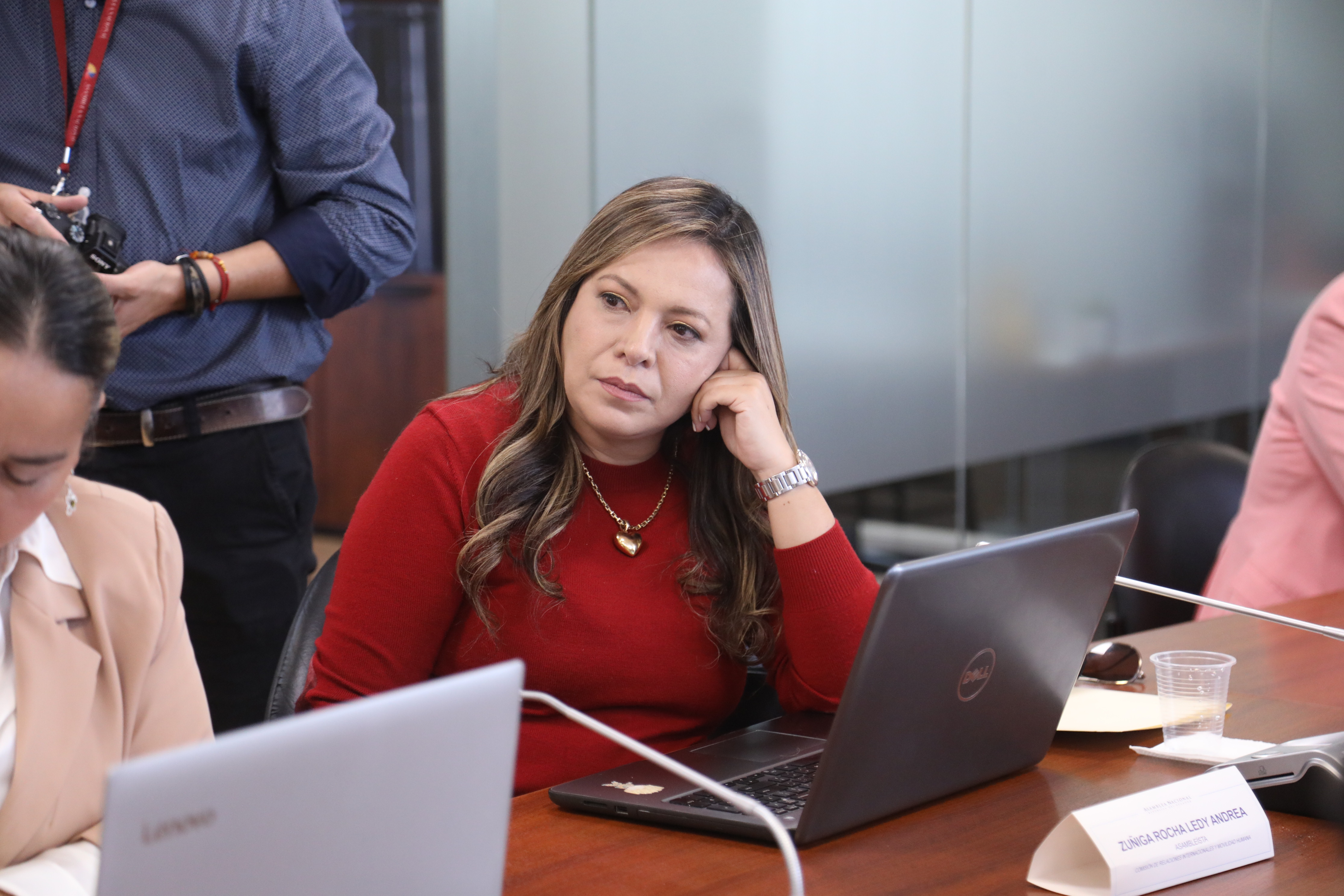
- in 2026
- Occupation: politician
- Known for: Minister for Justice
- Political party: Citizen Revolution Movement

Ledy Andrea Zúñiga Rocha is a lawyer and a politician from Ecuador who became a Minister for Justice.

== Life ==
Zúñiga is a lawyer and a politician from Ecuador. She was appointed Minister of Justice, Human Rights, and Religious Affairs of Ecuador in 2014. She was said to be the first woman to lead the country's drug policy agency. She highlighted the special role of women in the drug trade. Many get involved in small time trading in order to support their family. She believed that the law needed to take gender into account.

She announced a co-operation with experts from France's National School of Penitentiary Administration, the Red Cross and the United Nations to introduce a "social rehabilitation system". 60 prison officers were trained in new approaches in May and June 2014. Eight of Ecuador's prison officers were sent to France for additional training.

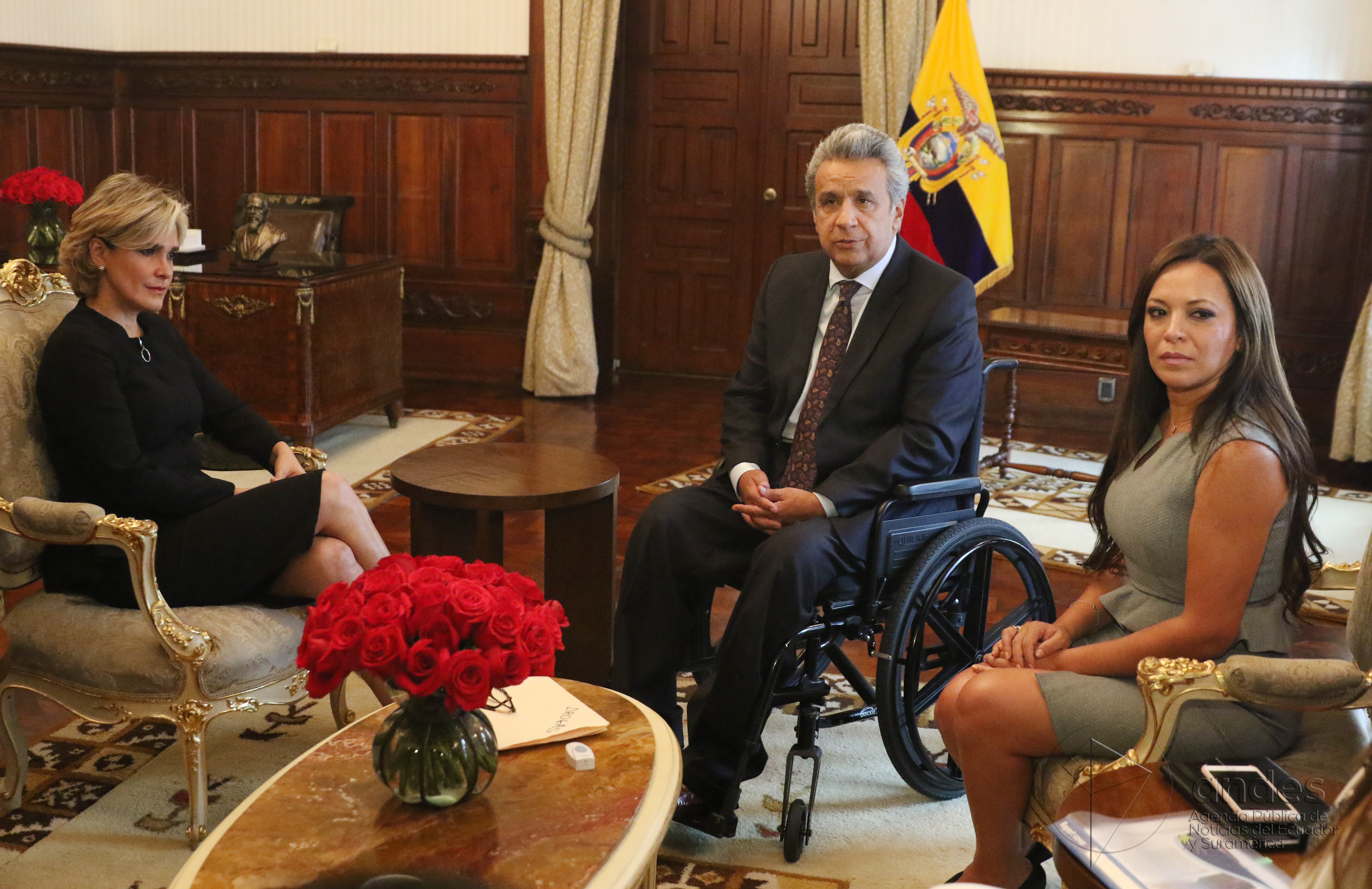
Cynthia Viteri, President Lenín Moreno and Zúñiga in 2017

After she was minister she led Ecuador's National Rehabilitation Council.

In 2025 she was elected to the National Assembly to serve until 2029. She is a member of the Citizen Revolution Political Movement and she represents the province of Pichincha. She joined the Assembly's Commission on International Relations and Human Mobility. It was led by Lucia Jaramillo with Edwin Estuardo Jarrín Rivadeneira as her duputy. Other members included Sara Noemí Cabrera Chacón, Arisdely Paola Parrales Yagual, Doménica Carolina Escobar Galarza, Graciela Janeth Ramírez Chalán and Bertha Betsabé Vélez Vélez.

== Controversy ==
In 2025 another party and National Assembly member, Santiago Díaz, proposed that the age of consent should be reduced from 18 to 14. Zúñiga was among ten from her party who gave their support. She later said that this was because the proposal included a change to the penalty for femicide from 26 to 30 years. She withdrew her support after Santiago Díaz was accused of having sex with a twelve-year-old and she and others supported his arrest. Diaz was arrested and sent to trial in November.
