= Felipe de Zúñiga y Ontiveros =

The title page of Antonio de León y Gama's account of the Aztec calendar stone

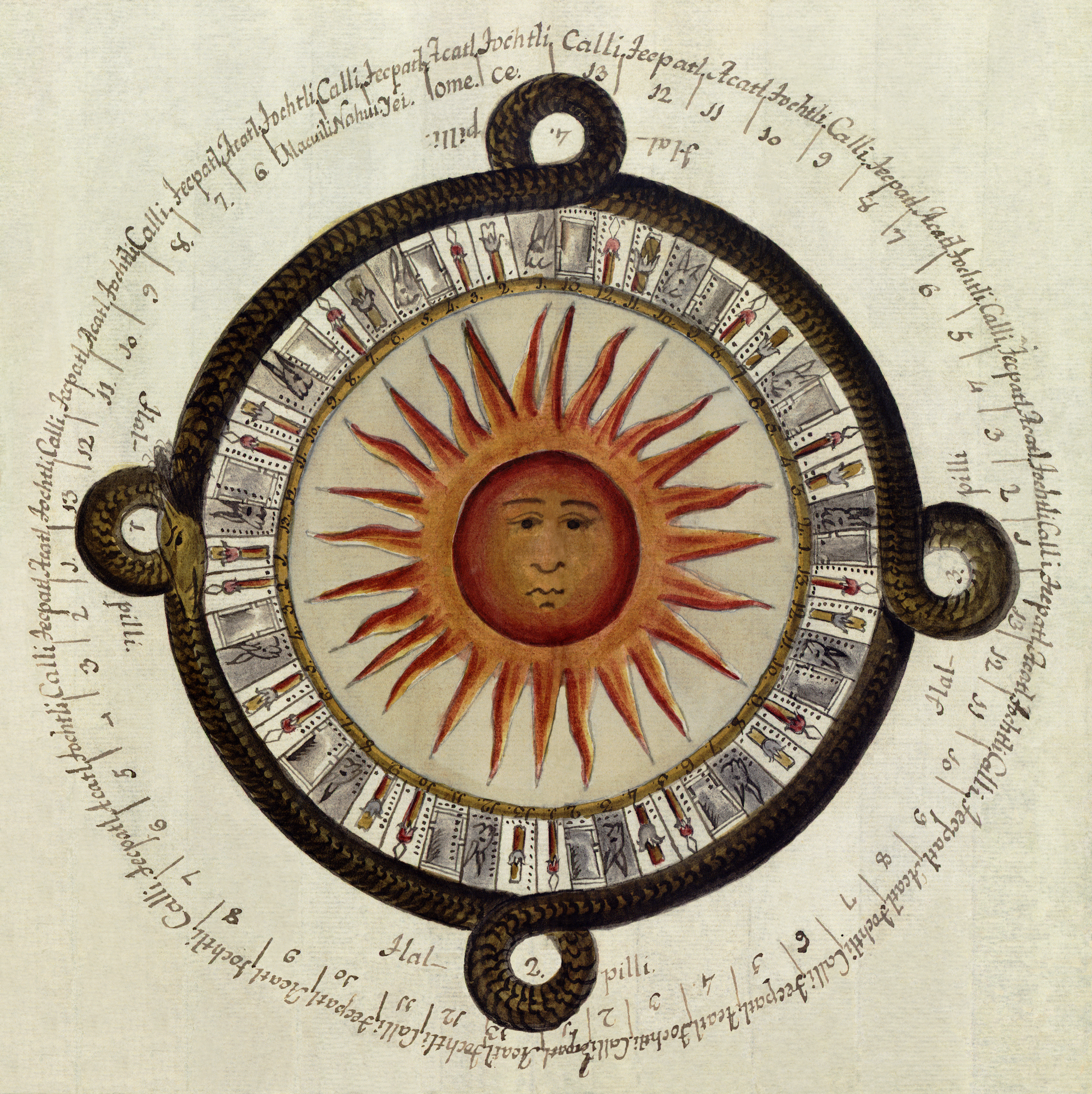
Illustration on the méxican ancient calendar from the Antonio de Leon y Gama's book

Felipe de Zúñiga y Ontiveros (1717, in Mexico City – 1793, in Mexico City) was a scientist, cartographer and publisher in New Spain during the Spanish colonial period. He was also royal land surveyor and hydraulic and mining engineer.

Together with his brother Cristóbal, he took over the Imprenta Antuerpiana (Antuerpiana Press) in 1752. They remained as sole proprietors until late 1764. By 1767 this was the largest printing establishment in the Americas. In that year Manuel Antonio Valdés y Munguía joined the business. After Zúñiga's death in 1793, Valdés took on Luis Abadiano as a partner (about 1821). At the time of Valdés's death in 1831, the firm was the oldest publisher in Mexico.

From 1762 to 1780 Zúñiga y Ontiveros published Efemérides calculadas y pronosticadas según el meridiano de México. These octavo volumes contained information on eclipses and other astronomical phenomena. In 1767 he began publishing Guía de Forasteros, a kind of almanac, which was published each year through 1792, although the name was changed to Calendario mensual (Monthly Calendar). He also published an updated version of Carlos de Sigüenza y Góngora's map of the valley of Mexico.

Zúñiga paid much attention to detail in the works he published, including the typefaces. He spent 50,000 pesos acquiring type from Antwerp and Madrid. He was the first to use type cast in New Spain, by the clockmaker and printer Dimas Rangel, with whom Zúñiga edited Estatutos de la Real Academia de San Carlos (Statutes of the Royal Academy of San Carlos) (1785).

He was the author of Bomba hidráulica para levantar las aguas (Hydraulic Pump to Raise Water) (1770) and a sonnet published in Fénix de los mineros ricos (1779).

== Other works published by Zúniga ==
- Neve, Felipe de, Reglamento para el Gobierno de la Peninsula de Californias (1784) — government regulations for the Californias
- Palóu, Francisco, Relacion Historica de la Vida y Apos tolicas Tareas del Venerable Padre Fray Junipero Serra, y de las Misiones que fundó en la California Septentrional, y nuevos establecimientos de Monterey (1787) — the life and work of Father Junípero Serra, founder of many California missions
- León y Gama, Antonio de, Descripción histórica y cronológica de las dos piedras que con occasion del nueve empedrado que se está formando en la plaza principal de Mexico (1792) — a description of the Aztec calendar stone shortly after it was rediscovered
