= Juan José Eguiara y Eguren =

Mexican bishop (1696–1763)

Juan Eguren
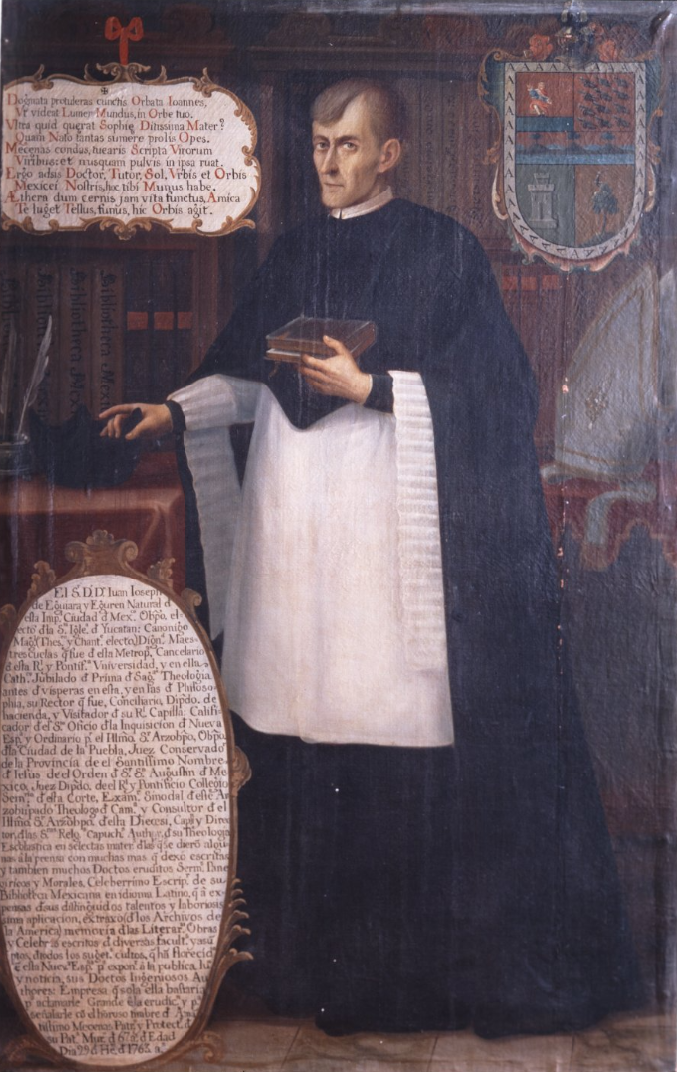
- Born: 2 February 1696; Mexico City, Spain
- Died: 29 January 1763 (aged 66); Mexico City, Spain

Juan José Eguiara y Eguren (2 February 1696 – 29 January 1763) was a Mexican Catholic scholar and bishop. He is the author of Bibliotheca mexicana, "a pioneering bibliographical work for Mexico."

== Life ==
Eguiara y Eguren was of Basque heritage, with his father an immigrant merchant and his mother a first-generation American-born Basque. He was a brilliant student, ultimately earning a doctorate in theology, and he became a faculty member at the University of Mexico. He was elected rector in 1749. His learning was extensive, covering theology, canon law, philosophy, mathematics, and letters; and he was a gifted orator. Eguiara was elected Bishop of Yucatán, but did not take the post claiming ill health. He continued his literary work in Mexico City. He has been called "the initiator of the history of ideas in Mexico."

== Works ==
Eguiara y Eguren published his Biblioteca Mexicana in response to the text of the Dean of Alicante, Manuel Martí, which denigrated the attainments of the men of letters of the New World in his "epistolas latinas" printed in Madrid in 1735.

He published the first volume, which comprised the letters A, B, and C, and left in manuscript many biographies down to J. In the preface he refutes the charges of Dean Martí with much spirit and patriotism. The Biblioteca Mexicana is written in Latin and, besides the fact that it is incomplete, a pompous style detracts from it. It was, though, the first work of its kind published in Mexico and perhaps in the whole of Spanish-America. The complete title is Biblioteca Mexicana sive eruditorum historia virorum qui in America Boreali nati, vel alibi geniti, in ipsam domicilio aut studiis asciti, quavis lingua scripto aliquid tradiderunt. Ferdinando VI Hispaniarum Regi Catholico, Nuncupata Mexici 1755.

He also published "Panegiricos", printed separately in Mexico (1727–57); "Elogios fúnebres" (1755–66); "Praelectiones" (Mexico, 1746); fourteen volumes in theological and juridical questions; twenty volumes of sermons and instructions; and several other treatises.

== See also ==
Luis Abadiano
