= Olivia Zúñiga =

Mexican poet, novelist, and essayist (1916–1992)

- Born: Olivia Zúñiga Correa; 21 August 1916; Villa Purificación, Jalisco, Mexico
- Died: 1992 (aged 75–76)
- Occupations: Poet, novelist, essayist
- Spouse: Heliodoro Rojas
- Children: 2
- Writing career
- Language: Spanish

Olivia Zúñiga Correa (21 August 1916 – 1992) was a Mexican poet, novelist, and essayist.

== Biography ==
Olivia Zúñiga Correa was born in Villa Purificación, Jalisco, on 21 August 1916. Her parents were the revolutionary General Eugenio Zúñiga and Trinidad Correa Gonzalez-Hermosillo.

From the age of two or three she was under the care of a maternal uncle, priest Rafael Guillermo Correa González-Hermosillo, who took her to live in Tenamaxtlán, Jalisco and assigned her a private teacher, Miss Crescencia López. Later, Olivia dedicated herself to reading the books of the parish.

In 1930, General Lázaro Cárdenas, who had been part of the General Staff of General Eugenio Zúñiga in 1914, took her to live in Mexico City. Olivia, of extraordinary beauty, in 1942 was studying dramatic art with the japanese actor, stage director and choreographer Seki Sano.

Her first work was published in print in 1947, a volume of poetry titled Amante imaginado (Imagined Lover), with a prologue by the Spanish playwright Luis Fernández Ardavín.

In the 1950s and 1960s she collaborated in the Guadalajaran magazines Ariel, by Emmanuel Carballo; Et Caetera, by Adalberto Navarro Sánchez, and Summa and Xallixtlico, by Arturo Rivas Sainz (of whom she was a student in the subject of Grammar), and in the Mexico City magazines Fuensanta and México en la Cultura.

She also wrote for the readers of the newspapers Excélsior, Supplement of Novedades de México, and El Nacional.

Her novels are decidedly autobiographical. She was the first person to receive the Premio de Literatura Jalisco, in 1950, for her novel Retrato de una niña triste (Portrait of a Sad Girl). In 1958 she received the José María Vigil Medal, which is awarded to distinguished writers.

In her last years she could be seen in Mexico City, living alone and with her face covered by a veil, because like the Swedish actress Greta Garbo, she disliked for people to see how time had taken its toll on her beauty.

== Works ==
=== Poetry ===
- Amante imaginado (Imagined Lover), 1947.
- Los amantes y la noche (The Lovers and the Night), 1953.
- Hasta el grano de luz (Until the grain of light), 1969.
- El hijo, inédito (The son, unpublished).

=== Novel ===
- Retrato de una niña triste (Portrait of a Sad Girl), 1950.
- Entre el infierno y la luz (Between Hell and Light), 1952.
- La muerte es una ciudad distinta (Death is a Different City), 1959.

=== Story ===
- Antología universal de lecturas infantiles (Universal Anthology of Children's Reading), 1952.

=== Essay ===
- Mathias Goeritz, 1962; it was later translated into English.
