= Centro de Estudios Públicos =

Chilean think tank

- Established: 17 April 1980
- Focus: Public policy
- President: Juan Obach
- Executive director: Leonidas Montes
- Location: Nuncio Monseñor Sótero Sanz 162, Providencia, Santiago de Chile, Chile
- Website: www.cepchile.cl

Centro de Estudios Públicos (CEP) is a non-profit Chilean think tank founded in 1980. Its stated mission is to "contribute to the development of a free and democratic society" through: 1) the analysis and dissemination of philosophical, political, social and economic problems of interest to Chilean society; 2) the study, discussion and design of public policies; and 3) the promotion of institutions that support and enable the existence of a constitutional and democratic order. CEP contributes to the public debate through its seminars, the policy brief Puntos de Referencia, the journal, Estudios Públicos which has appeared continuously since 1980, the publication of books and various research studies, as well as social surveys, which have been conducted since 1987. CEP has become a household name for political, academic, and intellectual debate.

Currently, CEP is engaged with the constitutional debate, public policy, modernization of the State, the study of social sciences and humanities. It has a multidisciplinary team composed of 22 full-time researchers, with expertise in the fields of economics, education, health, constitutional law, environmental studies, among others.

== Notable speakers ==
Lectures have been given by people including Mario Vargas Llosa, Hernando de Soto, Michael Novak, Robert Lucas, Eric Donald Hirsch, Eric Anderson, Friedrich Hayek, Margaret Thatcher, Václav Klaus, Peter Berger, Salman Rushdie and Milton Friedman.

== Publications ==
- Joaquín Barceló 2021. Para leer La Divina Comedia. Santiago: Ediciones Tácitas.
- Joaquín Fermandois 2021. La democracia en Chile: trayectoria de Sísifo. Santiago: Ediciones UC.
- Juan Luis Ossa 2020. Chile Constitucional. Santiago: Fondo de Cultura Económica.
- Rodrigo Valdés y Rodrigo Vergara (eds.) 2020. Aspectos económicos de la Constitución. Alternativas y propuestas. Santiago: Fondo de Cultura Económica.
- Carolina Velasco y Alejandra Benítez 2020. Propuestas para una reforma integral del Fondo Nacional de Salud. Santiago: Centro de Estudios Públicos.
- Isabel Aninat, Ignacio Irarrázaval, Slaven Razmilic y Jorge Rodríguez 2020. Más allá de Santiago: descentralización fiscal en Chile. Santiago: Centro de Estudios Públicos y Centro UC Políticas Públicas.
- Varios autores 2018. Gestión de personas en el Estado. Primer Informe grupo de trabajo para la modernización del Estado. Santiago: Centro de Estudios Públicos, Chile 21, Espacio Público, Libertad y Desarrollo.
- Varios autores 2018. Transparencia, acceso a información pública y gestión de la información en el Estado. Segundo Informe grupo de trabajo para la modernización del Estado. Santiago: Centro de Estudios Públicos, Chile 21, Espacio Público, Libertad y Desarrollo.
- Isabel Aninat S. y Rodrigo Vergara M., 2019. Inmigración en Chile. Una mirada multidimensional. Santiago: Fondo de Cultura Económica.
- Joaquín Trujillo Silva 2019. Andrés Bello: libertad, imperio, estilo. Santiago: Editorial Roneo.
- Leonidas Montes (ed.) 2019. Encantamientos en prosa. Conversando con Peter Sloterdijk. Santiago: Fondo de Cultura Económica.
- Jacques Clerc, Juan Carlos Olmedo, Jaime Peralta, María Luisa Saavedra, Enzo Sauma, Ignacio Urzúa y Andrés Hernando 2018. Energías renovables en Chile: Hacia una inserción eficiente en la matriz eléctrica. Santiago: Centro de Estudios Públicos.
- Isabel Aninat S. y Slaven Razmilic 2018. Un Estado para la Ciudadanía. Estudios para su modernización. Santiago: Centro de Estudios Públicos.
- Ricardo González 2018 Modernización: Sus otras caras. Santiago: Centro de Estudios Públicos.
- Ricardo González T. 2017. ¿Malestar en Chile? Informe Encuesta CEP 2016. Santiago: Centro de Estudios Públicos.
- Óscar Arteaga, Harald Beyer, Soledad Martínez, Emilio Santelices, Carolina Velasco y Salvador Villarino (coords.) 2017. Propuesta de modernización y fortalecimiento de los prestadores estatales de servicios de salud. Santiago: Centro de Estudios Públicos y Escuela de Salud Pública Universidad de Chile.
- Isabel Aninat S., Ricardo González T., y Verónica Figueroa Huencho (eds.) 2017. El pueblo mapuche en el siglo XXI. Propuestas para un nuevo entendimiento entre culturas en Chile. Santiago: Centro de Estudios Públicos.
- Isabel Aninat S. y Slaven Razmilic (coords.) 2017. Un Estado para la Ciudadanía. Informe de la Comisión de Modernización del Estado. Santiago: Centro de Estudios Públicos.
- Thomas Bullemore y Javier Gallego (eds.) 2016. Igualitarismo: una discusión necesaria. Santiago: Centro de Estudios Públicos.
- Hugo Eduardo Herrera 2016. La frágil universidad. Seguido de derechos sociales, deliberación pública y universidad. Santiago: Centro de Estudios Públicos.
- Lucas Sierra I. (ed.) 2016. Propuestas Constitucionales. La academia y el cambio constitucional en Chile. Santiago: Centro de Estudios Públicos.
- Lucas Sierra I. (ed.) 2015. Diálogos Constitucionales. La academia y la cuestión constitucional en Chile. Santiago: Centro de Estudios Públicos.
- Fernando Claro y Juan José Donoso 2015. Geografía de Pájaros. Chile Central. Santiago: Centro de Estudios Públicos.
- Vittorio Corbo (ed.) 2014. Growth opportunities for Chile. Santiago: Editorial Universitaria.
- José Pablo Arellano y Vittorio Corbo (eds.) 2013. Tributación para el desarrollo. Estudios para la reforma del sistema chileno. Santiago: Centro de Estudios Públicos, Cieplan.
- Joaquín Fermandois 2013. La revolución inconclusa. La izquierda chilena y el gobierno de la Unidad Popular. Santiago: Centro de Estudios Públicos.
- Cristián Pérez I. 2013. Vidas revolucionarias. Santiago: Editorial Universitaria.
- Miguel González Pino, Arturo Fontaine T. (eds.) 2013. Los mil días de Allende. Portadas y recortes de prensa, fotografías y caricaturas. Santiago: Centro de Estudios Públicos.
- Francisco Javier Díaz, Lucas Sierra I. (eds.) 2012. Democracia con partidos. Informe para la reforma de los partidos políticos en Chile. Santiago: Centro de Estudios Públicos, Cieplan.
- Lucas McClure, Lucas Sierra I. 2011. Frente a las mayorías: Leyes supramayoritarias y Tribunal Constitucional en Chile. Santiago: Centro de Estudios Públicos, Cieplan, Libertad y Desarrollo, Proyectamérica.
- Vicente Espinoza y Sebastián Madrid 2010. Trayectoria y eficacia política de los militantes en juventudes políticas. Estudio de la élite política emergente. Santiago: Centro de Estudios Públicos, Cieplan, ProyectAmérica, Libertad y Desarrollo, Instituto de Estudios Avanzados USACH.
- Arturo Fontaine T., Cristián Larroulet, Ignacio Walker y Jorge Navarrete (eds.) 2009. Reforma del sistema electoral chileno. Santiago: Centro de Estudios Públicos, Cieplan, ProyectAmérica, Libertad y Desarrollo.
- Loreto Fontaine C. y Bárbara Eyzaguirre 2008. Las escuelas que tenemos. Santiago: Centro de Estudios Públicos.
- David Skilling et al. 2007, Institucionalidad para el desarrollo: Los nuevos desafíos. Santiago: Centro de Estudios Públicos, Expansiva.
- Alexander Galetovic (ed.) 2006. Santiago. Dónde estamos y hacia dónde vamos. Santiago: Centro de Estudios Públicos.
- Fernando Zúñiga, 2006. Mapudungun. El habla mapuche. Santiago: Centro de Estudios Públicos.
- Antonio Cussen, Arturo Fontaine T., Harald Beyer, y Loreto Fontaine C. (eds.) 2006. Cuento contigo. Santiago: Centro de Estudios Públicos.
- Adalberto Salas y Fernando Zúñiga 2006. El mapuche o araucano. Fonología, gramática y antología de cuentos. Santiago: Centro de Estudios Públicos.
- Ignacio Irarrázaval (ed.) 2003. Desafíos de la descentralización. Santiago: Centro de Estudios Públicos.
- Salvador Valdés Prieto (ed.) 2002. Reforma del Estado. Volumen II: Dirección pública y compras públicas. Santiago: Centro de Estudios Públicos.
- Harald Beyer y Rodrigo Vergara M. (eds.) 2001.¿Qué hacer ahora? Propuestas para el desarrollo. Santiago: Centro de Estudios Públicos.
- Felipe Morandé Lavín y Rodrigo Vergara M. (eds.) 2001. Análisis empírico del ahorro en Chile. Santiago: Centro de Estudios Públicos.
- Víctor Farías 2001 La Izquierda Chilena 1969–1973. Santiago: Centro de Estudios Públicos.
- Felipe Larraín Bascuñán y Rodrigo Vergara M. (eds.) 2000. La transformación económica de Chile. Santiago: Centro de Estudios Públicos.
- Salvador Valdés Prieto (ed.) 2000. Reforma del Estado. Volumen I: Financiamiento político. Santiago: Centro de Estudios Públicos.
- Arturo Fontaine T. y Miguel González Pino (eds.) 1997. Los mil días de Allende. Santiago: Centro de Estudios Públicos.
- Loreto Fontaine C. Bárbara Eyzaguirre (eds.) 1997. El futuro en riesgo. Nuestros textos escolares. Santiago: Centro de Estudios Públicos.
- Felipe Morandé Lavín y Rodrigo Vergara M. (eds.)1997. Análisis empírico del crecimiento en Chile. Santiago: Centro de Estudios Públicos.
- Felipe Morandé Lavín y Rodrigo Vergara M. (eds.) 1996. Análisis empírico del tipo de cambio en Chile. Santiago: Centro de Estudios Públicos.
- Luis Hernán Paúl y Fernando F. Suárez (eds.) 1996. Competitividad. El gran desafío de las empresas chilenas. Santiago: Centro de Estudios Públicos.
- Sergio Baeza y Francisco Margozzini (eds.) 1995. Quince años después. Una mirada al sistema privado de pensiones. Santiago: Centro de Estudios Públicos.
- Michael Novak 1995. La ética católica y el espíritu del capitalismo. Santiago: Centro de Estudios Públicos.
- Juan Giaconi G. (ed.) 1995. La salud en el siglo XXI: Cambios necesarios. Santiago: Centro de Estudios Públicos.
- Ignacio Irarrázaval y Carla Lehmann (eds.) 1994. Más recursos para la ciudad. Santiago: Centro de Estudios Públicos, Centro de Estudios y Asistencia Legislativa.
- Ernesto Miranda (ed.) 1994. La salud en Chile: Evolución y perspectivas. Santiago: Centro de Estudios Públicos.
- Varios autores 1992. El Ladrillo: Bases de la política económica del gobierno militar chileno. Santiago: Centro de Estudios Públicos.
- Gabriel Del Fávero y Ricardo Katz (eds.) 1992. Medio ambiente en desarrollo. Santiago: Centro de Estudios Públicos.
- David Gallagher 1992. Improvisaciones. Santiago: Centro de Estudios Públicos.
- Pedro Gazmuri (ed.) 1992. Educación superior en Chile: Los programas de posgrado y el desarrollo científico. Santiago: Centro de Estudios Públicos.
- Varios autores (ed.) 1991. Colección Foro de la Educación Superior. Santiago: Centro de Estudios Públicos.
- Eugenio Valenzuela (ed.) 1991. Proposiciones para la reforma judicial. Santiago: Centro de Estudios Públicos.
- Tarsicio Castañeda 1990. Para combatir la pobreza: Política social y descentralización en Chile durante los ’80. Santiago: Centro de Estudios Públicos.
- Carla Lehmann 1990. Financiamiento de la educación superior: Antecedentes y desafíos. Santiago: Centro de Estudios Públicos.
- Hernán Cheyre 1988. La previsión en Chile ayer y hoy: Impacto de una reforma. Santiago: Centro de Estudios Públicos.
- Eliodoro Matte L. (ed.) 1988. Cristianismo, sociedad libre y opción por los pobres. Santiago: Centro de Estudios Públicos.
- Sergio Baeza y Rodrigo Manubens (eds.) 1988. Sistema privado de pensiones en Chile. Santiago: Centro de Estudios Públicos.
- Sergio Baeza (ed.) 1986. Análisis de la previsión en Chile. Santiago: Centro de Estudios Públicos.
- Armando de Ramón y José Manuel Larraín 1982. Orígenes de la vida económica chilena 1659–1808. Santiago: Centro de Estudios Públicos.
- Friedrich Hayek et al. 1981. Camino de libertad. Santiago: Centro de Estudios Públicos.
