= José Mariano Beristain =

Mexican historian

José Mariano Beristáin y Martín de Souza (22 May 1756 – 23 March 1817) was a Mexican bibliographer and author of one of the principal sources of knowledge of the bibliography of Mexico and Central America.

== Biography ==
Beristain was born in Puebla, Mexico, where he studied to become a secular priest. He completed his education in Spain, where he spent some time in the family of the former bishop of Puebla, then Archbishop of Toledo. Returning to Mexico (1811) he was made archdeacon of the Metropolitan church of Mexico (1813), and was afterwards its dean. He died in Mexico.

== Works ==
Beristain wrote a number of treatises, some of them on economic subjects, but hardly any were published, the manuscripts being mostly lost in sending them to Europe.

His magnum opus is the Biblioteca hispano-americana septentrional, the last part of which was published after his death. For this he used as a basis the Biblioteca mexicana of Bishop Juan José de Eguiara y Eguren of which only the first volume (as far as "J") appeared in print. Beristáin at first intended to republish Eguiara, completing the alphabet by means of sketches and notes left by the author, but, as he proceeded to carry out the idea, he found that it would be preferable to compose an independent bibliography, incorporating in it the material Eguiara had collected. Beristain's Biblioteca contains many errors in names and dates.
