= Wager Mutiny =

1741 British naval mutiny

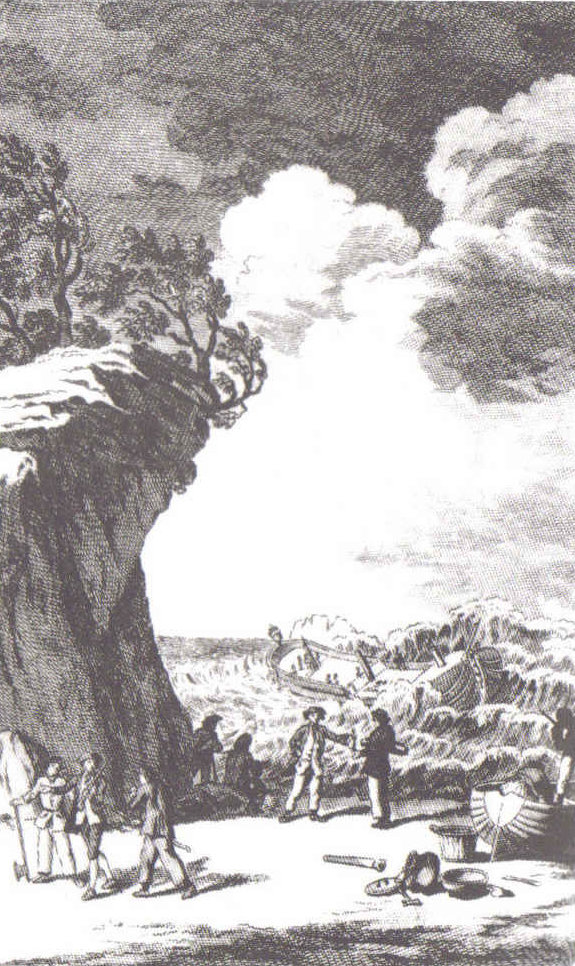
The Wreck of the Wager, frontispiece from John Byron's account

The Wager Mutiny took place in 1741, after the British warship HMS Wager was shipwrecked on a desolate island off the south coast of present-day Chile.

Wager was part of a naval squadron bound to attack Spanish interests in the Pacific. She lost contact with the squadron while rounding Cape Horn, ran aground during a storm, and wrecked on what would become known as Wager Island. The main body of the crew mutinied against their captain, David Cheap, abandoned him and a group of loyal crew members on the island, and set off in a modified schooner (named Speedwell) via the Strait of Magellan to Portuguese-administered Rio de Janeiro. Most of the mutineers either died or were abandoned on shore during the journey, but the survivors eventually returned to England.

Cheap's group could not weather the cape in the voyage north and therefore returned to Wager Island three months after they had left, having given up hope of escape. A few days later, however, a group of indigenous Chonos visited the island and, after some negotiation, agreed to guide the group north to the Spanish-inhabited Chiloé Archipelago in return for the longboat and some guns. Most of the group died on the journey from starvation and exposure, but Cheap and several others survived and returned to England in 1745, two years after the surviving mutineers.

The adventures of the crew of Wager were a public sensation and inspired many narratives written by survivors and others to the present day.

== Background and events before the wreck ==
=== HMS Wager ===
HMS Wager was a square-rigged, sixth-rate Royal Navy warship of 28 guns. She was built as an East Indiaman in approximately 1734 and made two voyages to India for the East India Company (EIC) before the navy purchased her in 1739. As an Indiaman, she carried 30 guns and had a crew of 98. Under Captain Charles Raymond, Wager sailed from the Downs on 13 February 1735, arriving in Madras on 18 July and returning to England via St Helena in July 1736. She made her second and final run for the EIC in 1738, sailing via the Cape of Good Hope to Madras and Bengal, and returning to the Downs on 27 August 1739.

The Admiralty purchased Wager from Mr J. Raymond on 21 November 1739, and rated her as a 28-gun sixth-rate. Wager was to complete a squadron under Commodore George Anson that would attack Spanish interests on the Pacific coast of South America, transporting arms, powder, and ammunition for landing parties. She was fitted for naval service at Deptford Dockyard between 23 November 1739 and 23 May 1740 for £7,096.2.4d and was registered as a sixth rate on 22 April 1740, being established with 120 men and 28 guns.

=== Commodore Anson's squadron ===
Anson's squadron consisted of some 1,980 men (crew plus infantry), of whom only 188 would survive the voyage. It included six warships and two victuallers (supply ships) in addition to Wager:

- Centurion, the flagship (a fourth-rate ship of 1,005 tons, 60 guns, and 400 men)
- Gloucester (866 tons, 50 guns, 300 men)
- Severn (683 tons, 50 guns, 300 men)
- Pearl (559 tons, 40 guns, 250 men)
- Wager (559 tons, 24 guns, 160 men)
- Tryal (201 tons, 8 guns, 70 men)

The two merchant vessels were Anna (400 tons, 16 men) and Industry (200 tons), both carrying additional stores. The squadron also included 470 invalids and disabled men discharged from Chelsea hospital under the command of Lieutenant Colonel Cracherode. Most of these men were the first to die during the hardships of the voyage. Their inclusion in place of regular troops was severely criticized by historian Glyndwr Williams as cruel and ineffective.

The inclusion of the invalids and marines caused overcrowding. For example, the Wager sailed with 250 men, only 105 of whom were crew.

=== Spithead to Staten Island ===
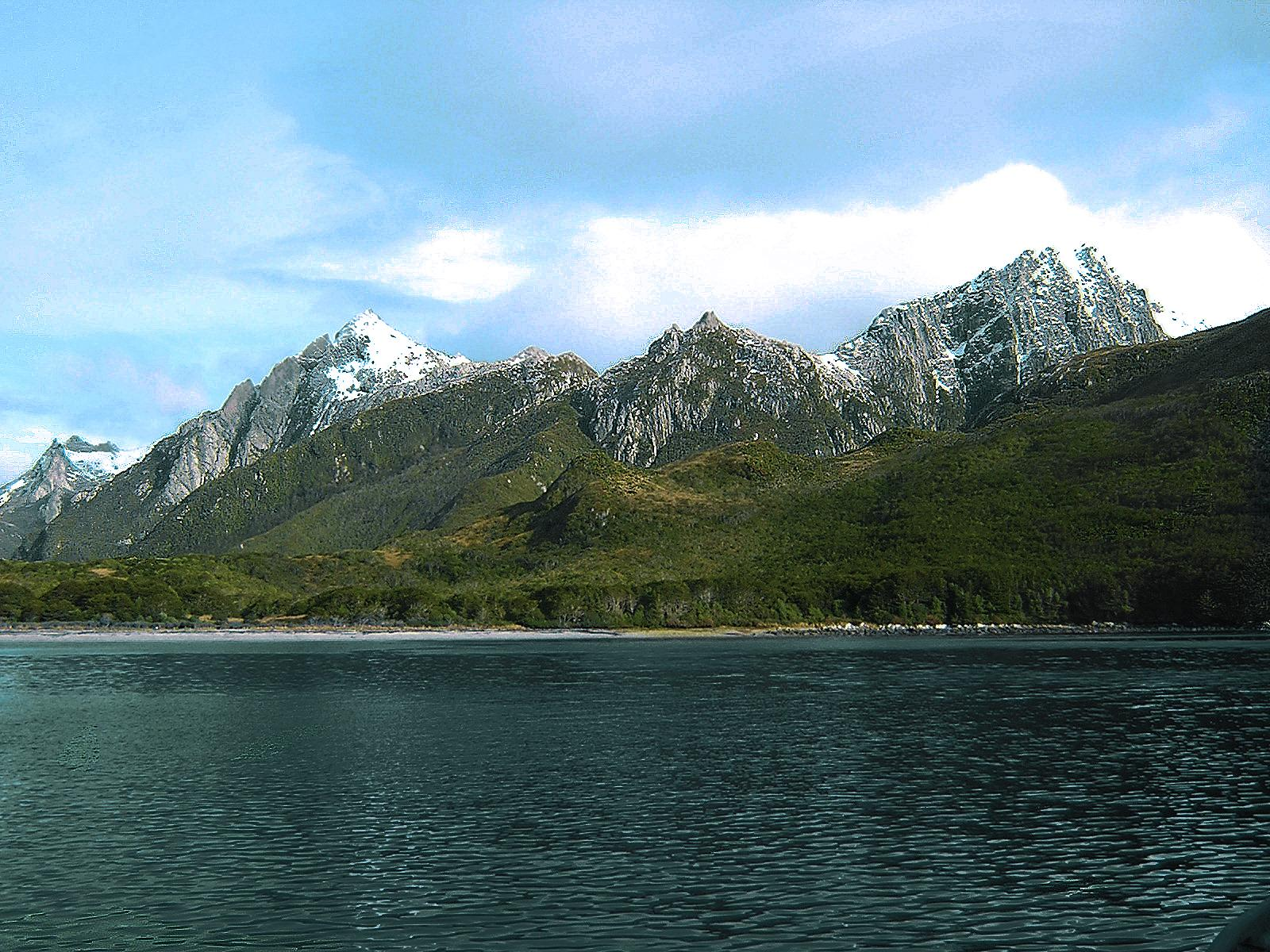
North coast of Staten Island (Isla de los Estados)

The squadron took forty days to reach Funchal, where they replenished supplies of water, wood, and food before making the Atlantic crossing to Santa Catarina. Two weeks into this leg of the journey, the store ship Industry signaled to Anson. The captain of Industry informed Anson that her contract had been fulfilled and the ship would return to England immediately. Her stores were distributed among the remaining ships, with a large quantity of rum sent aboard Wager. Many men in the squadron died of scurvy due to lack of fresh citrus fruits or meats. The high contingent of invalids, coupled with disease among the crew, meant that Anson's squadron was in poor condition for the arduous rounding of Cape Horn.

Anson used his authority to have Captain Dandy Kidd transferred from Wager to Pearl and Captain Murray to Wager. Kidd died of sickness after the squadron left Santa Catarina and before they reached the straits of Staten Island. He allegedly made a deathbed prediction of success and riches for some, but death and devastating hardship for the crew of Wager.

Murray was relieved of command and sent back to the Pearl. Anson then moved Lieutenant David Cheap from the small sloop Tryal and named him acting captain of Wager. Cheap had no experience commanding a large vessel. Cheap was, however, a capable seaman and navigator, a big and imposing man, and a loyal and determined officer. Anson impressed on Cheap the importance of Wager and her role in the mission, as the squadron would draw on her store of small arms and ammunition to attack shore bases along the coast of present-day Chile, along with the heavy siege guns carried in the ship's hold.

=== The rounding of the Horn ===
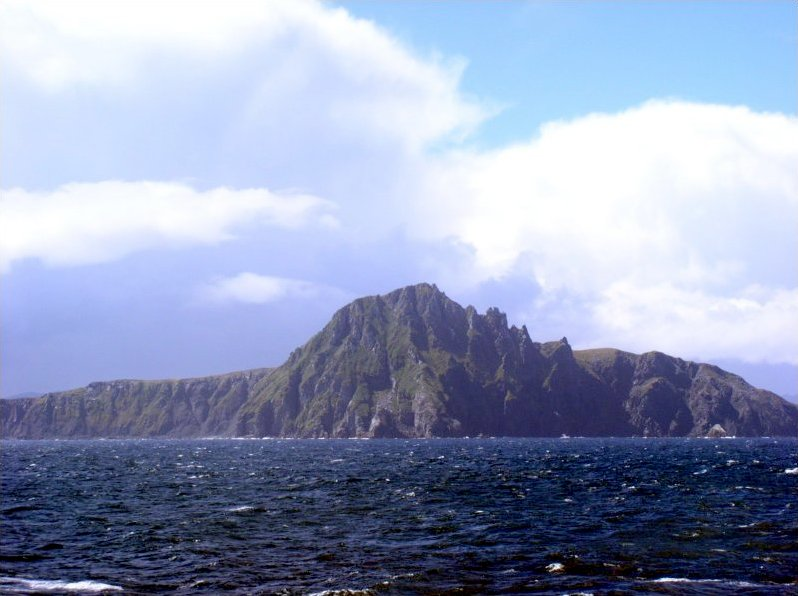
Cape Horn, near the southern tip of South America

The delays of the voyage were most keenly felt when the squadron rounded Cape Horn. Weather conditions were atrocious; high sea states and contrary winds meant that progress west was very slow. Added to this was the deteriorating health of Wager's crew: the ongoing scurvy outbreak meant few non-disabled seamen were available to work the ship and carry out running repairs to the continually battered rigging.

After many weeks working westwards to clear the Horn, the squadron turned north when navigational reckoning suggested enough westing had been made. At this time, latitudinal determination was relatively easy with the use of a sextant; however, longitudinal determination was much harder to predict, requiring accurate timepieces or a good view of the stars on stable ground, neither of which was available to the squadron. The only other method available was dead reckoning, an impossible task given the storm conditions, strong, unfamiliar currents, and the length of time involved. The intention was to turn north only when Anson was reasonably certain that the Horn had been cleared.

The result was nearly a complete disaster. In the middle of the night, the moon shone through the cloud for a few minutes, revealing to diligent sentinels aboard Anna towering waves breaking onto the Patagonian coastline. Anna fired guns and set up lights to warn the other ships of the danger. Without this sighting, the whole of Anson's squadron would have been dashed upon the coast, with the likely loss of all hands. The ships turned around and headed south again into huge seas and a foul wind. During one particularly severe night, Wager became separated from the rest of the squadron and was unable to reestablish contact; the squadron assumed she was lost and continued.

== Events leading up to the wreck and on Wager Island ==
=== The wrecking of Wager ===
Yellow dots show the location of Spanish settlements and forts within the modern boundaries of Chile and Argentina. Presidente Ríos Lake is shown in blue.

As Wager, now alone, continued beating to the west, the crew debated when to turn north and hopefully rejoin Anson. The ship was in bad shape, however, and nearly out of healthy crew members to man her. The dilemma became contentious when Cheap stated his intention to make for Socorro Island. The gunner, John Bulkeley, objected strongly to this proposal, instead arguing that they should proceed to the secondary squadron rendezvous, the island of Juan Fernández, their primary destination; it was not as close to the mainland as Socorro and was less likely to result in the wrecking of the ship on a lee shore. Bulkeley was recognized as probably the most capable seaman on the ship and held an officer's rank. Navigation was technically the master's responsibility, Thomas Clark, but Cheap had little respect for him or his opinions.

Bulkeley repeatedly tried and failed to convince Cheap that, given the state of Wager and the uncharted area they were in, he should change his navigational course or risk wrecking the ship. Bulkeley was to prove exactly correct, but Cheap refused to change course. What Bulkeley did not know was that Cheap was following his orders, and it had been impressed upon him that the siege guns in the hold of Wager were required for attacking Valdivia; he was unwilling to abandon hope of reuniting with Anson. These orders were secret and Bulkeley's belief that Juan Fernández was their secondary rendezvous was incorrect.

On 13 May 1741, at 9 am, John Cummins, Wager's carpenter, went forward to inspect the ship's chainplates. Whilst there, he thought he caught a fleeting glimpse of land to the west. The first lieutenant, Baynes, was also on deck but saw nothing; thus, the sighting was not reported. Baynes was later reprimanded at a court-martial for failing to alert the captain, thereby losing a precious opportunity to save the ship. Unbeknownst to the crew, Wager had entered a large uncharted bay, now called the Gulf of Penas, and the land to the west was later to be called the Tres Montes Peninsula.

At 2 pm, land was positively sighted to the west and northwest. All surviving hands were mustered to make sail and turn the ship to the southwest. During the frantic operations that followed, Cheap fell down the quarterdeck ladder and dislocated his shoulder, resulting in his confinement below. What followed was a night of terrible weather, with Wager becoming difficult to steer as her lack of maintenance left the hull and rigging at breaking point. At 4:30 am, the ship struck rocks repeatedly and broke her tiller. The hull was punctured, and water quickly flooded the lower decks, drowning dozens of ill and disabled crew members. Bulkeley and another sailor, John Jones, began steering the ship with sail alone towards land, but later in the morning the ship struck again; this time, the hull was damaged beyond repair and Wager began to sink.

=== Shipwrecked on Wager Island ===
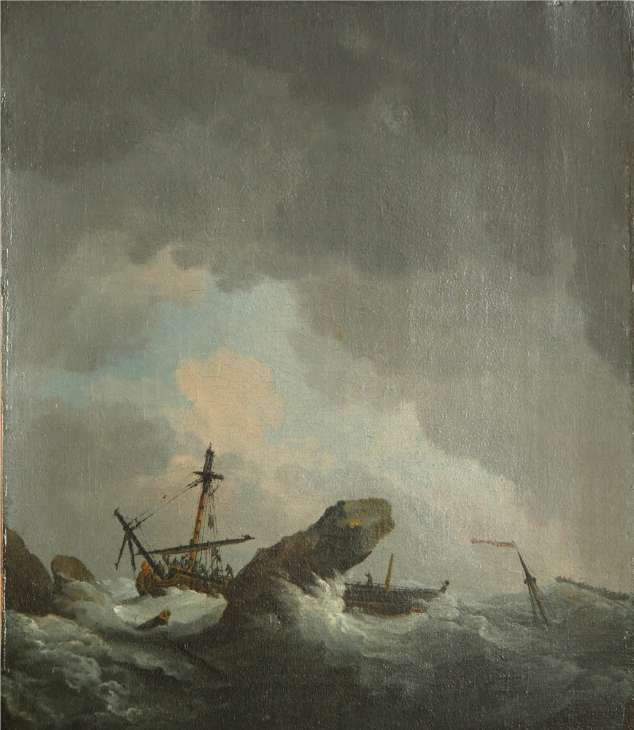
Wreck of HMS Wager, by Charles Brooking (1744), based on Bulkeley's published journal

Wager struck rocks off the coast of a small, uninhabited island. Overcome with terror at the prospect of sinking, some of the men ransacked the ship's rum stores and became uncontrollably drunk and violent. As they went about looting the officers' quarters, the other survivors took to the boats and reached land. They detached four vessels that were strapped to the deck: a longboat, a cutter, a yawl, and a barge, and used these to get to shore and to return many times to get supplies off the ship. Their prospects were desperate, as they were shipwrecked far into the southern latitudes at the start of winter; little food remained, and the desolate island had few resources to sustain them.

The crew was dangerously divided, with many blaming Cheap for their predicament. On 15 May, Wager bilged (the bottom of the hull broke open) amidships, and many of the drunken crew were found to have drowned. The only crewmembers left aboard were boatswain John King, a rebellious and difficult individual, and a few of his followers, but after a few days they consented to be taken ashore.

=== Mutiny ===
With the crew of Wager frightened at their situation and angry with Cheap, dissent and insubordination grew. King managed to find and load a cannon, firing a shot at Cheap's hut and threatening to load another until the captain sent boats to rescue him and his followers.

The crew knew that they were in danger of harsh justice if they mutinied, so for the time, they tried to negotiate with Cheap. Full mutiny would likely not have occurred had Cheap agreed to a plan of escape devised by Bulkeley, who had the confidence of most of the men. He proposed that Cummins, the carpenter, would lengthen the longboat and convert it into a schooner which could accommodate more men. They would make their way via the Strait of Magellan to either Brazil or the British West Indies, and then home to England. The smaller barge and cutter would accompany the schooner and be important for inshore foraging work along their journey. Bulkeley was skillful enough to give the plan a chance of success. Despite much prevarication, Cheap refused to accept Bulkeley's plan.

Cheap was in a predicament. By being shipwrecked, he would automatically be tried with the possibility of expulsion from the navy, and a strong likelihood of a lifetime of poverty and isolation. At worst, he could be found guilty of cowardice and executed by firing squad, as demonstrated a few years later by the 1757 execution of Admiral John Byng. Cheap wanted to head north along the coast to rendezvous with Anson at Valdivia. His warrant officers had warned him against some of his actions, which would reflect badly on him when the Admiralty investigated the loss of Wager.

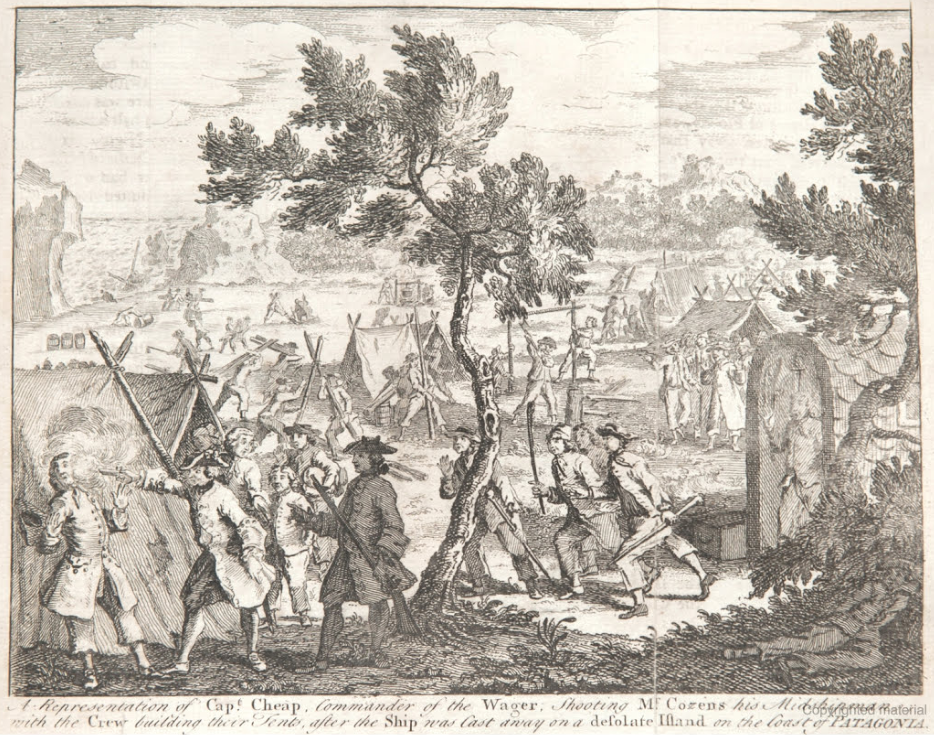
Captain Cheap shoots Midshipman Cozens in the face (from Layman (2015))

The mutineers later justified their actions based on other events, including Cheap's shooting of a midshipman named Henry Cozens. Cheap heard an altercation and a shot fired outside his tent, came out in a rage, and shot Cozens, with whom he had a documented animosity, in the face at point-blank range without any warning. Cheap ordered Cozens moved to the sick tent, where he was operated on twice to remove the bullet and a fragment, but died after 14 days.

Cummins continued modifying the boats for an undetermined plan of escape, and outright mutiny remained only a possibility so long as his work continued. Once the schooner was ready, however, events happened quickly. Bulkeley set the wheels in motion by drafting the following letter for Cheap to sign:

Whereas upon a General Consultation, it has been agreed to go from this Place through the Streights of Magellan, for the coast of Brazil, in our way for England: We do, notwithstanding, find the People separating into Parties, which must consequently end in the Destruction of the whole Body; and as also there have been great robberies committed on the Stores and every Thing is now at a Stand; therefore, to prevent all future Frauds and Animosities, we are unanimously agreed to proceed as above-mentioned.

Baynes was presented with the letter to read, after which he said:

I cannot suppose the Captain will refuse the signing of it; but he is so self-willed, the best step we can take, is to put him under arrest for the killing of Mr. Cozens. In this case I will, with your approbation, assume command. Then our affairs will be concluded to the satisfaction of the whole company, without being any longer liable to the obstruction they now meet from the Captain's perverseness and chicanery.

Cheap refused to sign Bulkeley's letter. Armed seamen entered his hut on 9 October and bound him, claiming that he was now their prisoner and they were taking him to England for trial for Cozens' murder. Lieutenant Hamilton of the Royal Marines was also confined, the mutineers fearing his resistance to their plan. Cheap was completely taken aback, having no real idea how far things had gone. He said to Lieutenant Baynes, "Well 'Captain' Baynes! You will doubtless be called to account for this hereafter."

== Events after the mutiny ==
=== The voyage of Speedwell ===
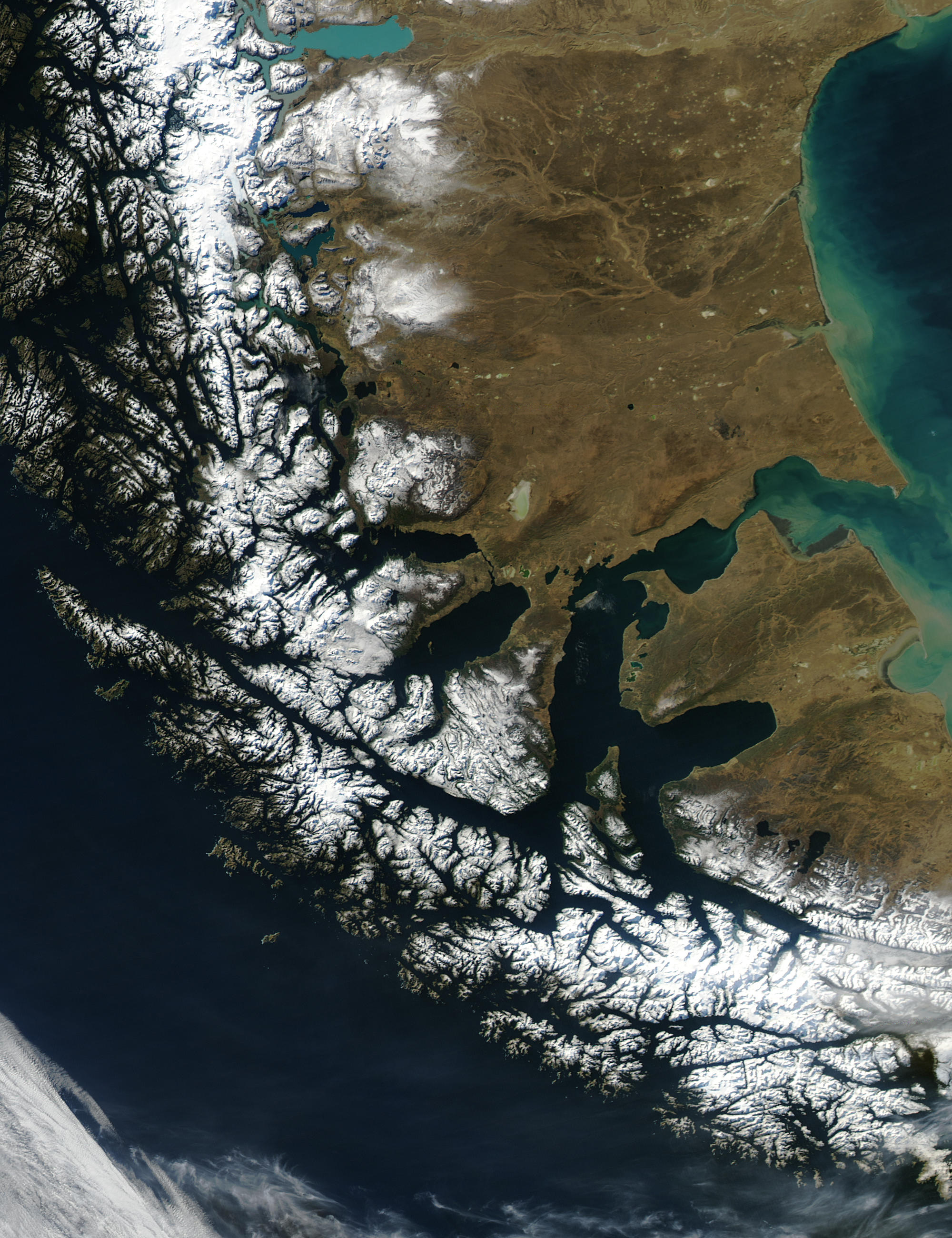
Satellite image of the Strait of Magellan

At noon on 13 October 1741, the schooner, now named the Speedwell, got under sail with the cutter and barge in company. Cheap refused to go, and to the relief of the mutineers, he agreed to be left behind with two marines who were earlier shunned for stealing food. Everyone expected Cheap to die on the island, making their arrival in England much easier to explain. Bulkeley assumed this by writing in his journal that day, "This was the last time I ever saw the unfortunate Captain Cheap." In the event, both men would make it back to England alive to tell their version of events, Cheap some two years after Bulkeley.

The voyage got off to a bad start. After repeatedly splitting sails, the barge was sent back to the island, where there were additional stores. Two midshipmen, John Byron and Alexander Campbell, who had not expected Cheap to be left behind, quietly slipped aboard the barge and were among the nine who returned. Once back at the island, the barge party was greeted by Cheap, who was delighted to hear of their wish to remain with him. Byron and Campbell then returned to the schooner to ask for their share of provisions, but they returned empty-handed. Bulkeley did not attempt to retrieve the barge, but set out for the Strait of Magellan immediately.

Speedwell and the cutter turned around and sailed south. The journey was arduous, and food was in very short supply. On 3 November, the cutter parted company; this was serious, as she was needed for inshore foraging. By now, Bulkeley was despairing of the men aboard the schooner; most were in the advanced stages of starvation, exposed in a desperately cold, open boat, and had lapsed into apathy. Some days later, they had good news: they sighted the cutter and rejoined it. Soon after, at night, she broke loose from her consort's tow line, with one man who was sleeping on it, and was wrecked on the coast. Of the eighty-one men who had departed about two weeks before, ten had already perished. The following day, eleven men requested to be cast out there rather than continue in the seemingly doomed trip. Bulkeley and Baynes drafted a certificate for the Lords of the Admiralty, stating that they had willingly made the decision and indemnified "all persons from ever being called to an account for putting us on shore". Sixty men remained aboard Speedwell. Eventually, the schooner entered the Strait of Magellan, in monstrous seas which threatened the boat with every swell. Men were dying from starvation regularly. Some days after exiting the Strait, the boat moved closer to land to take in water and hunt for food. Later, as the last of their supplies were being taken on board, Bulkeley made sail, abandoning eight men on the desolate shore 300 miles (480 km) south of Buenos Aires. For the second time, he would abandon men to a seemingly certain death, only to confront some of them back in England years later; three of the party he left behind, after much exertion, made it back to England alive. Only thirty-three men remained aboard Speedwell.

Eventually, and after a brief stop at a Portuguese outpost on the River Plate, where the crew were fleeced by the locals for meagre provisions and cheated by a priest who disappeared with their fowling pieces (shotguns) on the promise of returning with game, Speedwell set sail once more. On 28 January 1742, it sighted Rio Grande, after a journey of over two thousand miles in an open boat over fifteen weeks. Of the eighty-one men who set off from the island, thirty arrived at Rio in a desperate condition and one of those thirty, the carpenter William Oram, died soon after they landed.

=== Cheap's group ===
Title page of Byron's Book

Twenty men remained on the island after the departure of Speedwell. Poor weather continued during October and November. One man died of exposure after being marooned for three days on a rock for stealing food. By December and the summer solstice, it was decided to launch the barge and the yawl and skirt up the coast 300 miles (480 km) to an inhabited part of Chile. During bad weather, the yawl was overturned and lost, with the quartermaster drowned.

There was not enough room for everyone in the barge, and four of the most helpless men, all marines, were left on the shore to fend for themselves. In his account, Campbell describes events thus:

The loss of the yawl was a great misfortune to us who belonged to her (being seven in number) all our clothes, arms, etc. being lost with her. As the barge was not capable of carrying both us and her own company, being in all seventeen men, it was determined to leave four of the Marines on this desolate place. This was a melancholy thing, but necessity compelled us to it. And as we were obliged to leave some behind us, the marines were fixed on, as not being of any service on board. What made the case of these poor men the more deplorable, was the place being destitute of seal, shellfish, or anything they could possibly live upon. The captain left them arms, ammunition, a frying pan, and several other necessaries.

Fourteen men were now left, all in the barge. After repeated failed attempts to round the headland, they decided to return to the island and give up all hope of escape. The four stranded marines were looked for but had disappeared. Two months after leaving the island, Cheap's group returned. The thirteen survivors were close to death, and one man died of starvation shortly after arriving.

Back at the island, Cheap's health was observed to deteriorate markedly, with his legs swelling to twice their normal size. He also attracted criticism in Byron's subsequent narrative for taking more food than the others but doing less work. Fifteen days after returning to the island, the men were visited by a party of indigenous Chono nomads led by Martín Olleta, who were astonished to find castaways there. After some negotiation, with the surgeon speaking halting Spanish, the Chono agreed to guide Cheap's group to a small Spanish settlement up the coast, using an overland route to avoid the peninsula. The castaways traded the barge for the journey. The Chono highly valued Iron as this metal was scarce even in the Spanish settlements further north.

Martín Olleta led the survivors through an unusual route across Presidente Ríos Lake in the Taitao Peninsula, avoiding the common route through the San Tadeo River and San Rafael Lake. Byron gives a detailed account of the journey to the Spanish village of Castro in the Chiloé Archipelago, as does Campbell. The ordeal took four months, during which another ten men died of starvation, exhaustion, and fatigue. Marine Lieutenant Hamilton, Midshipmen Byron and Campbell, and Captain Cheap were the only survivors.

Before handing over the English to the Spanish authorities, Olleta's party stopped somewhere south of Chiloé Island to hide all iron objects, likely to avoid their confiscation. Scholar Ximena Urbina conjectures that Olleta must have lived close to the Spanish and heard from other natives of the wreckage; thus the rescue was not by chance but an enterprise done with prior knowledge of the Spanish interest in foreigners and of the valuable loot to be found at the wreck site.

=== Bulkeley and the Speedwell survivors return to England ===
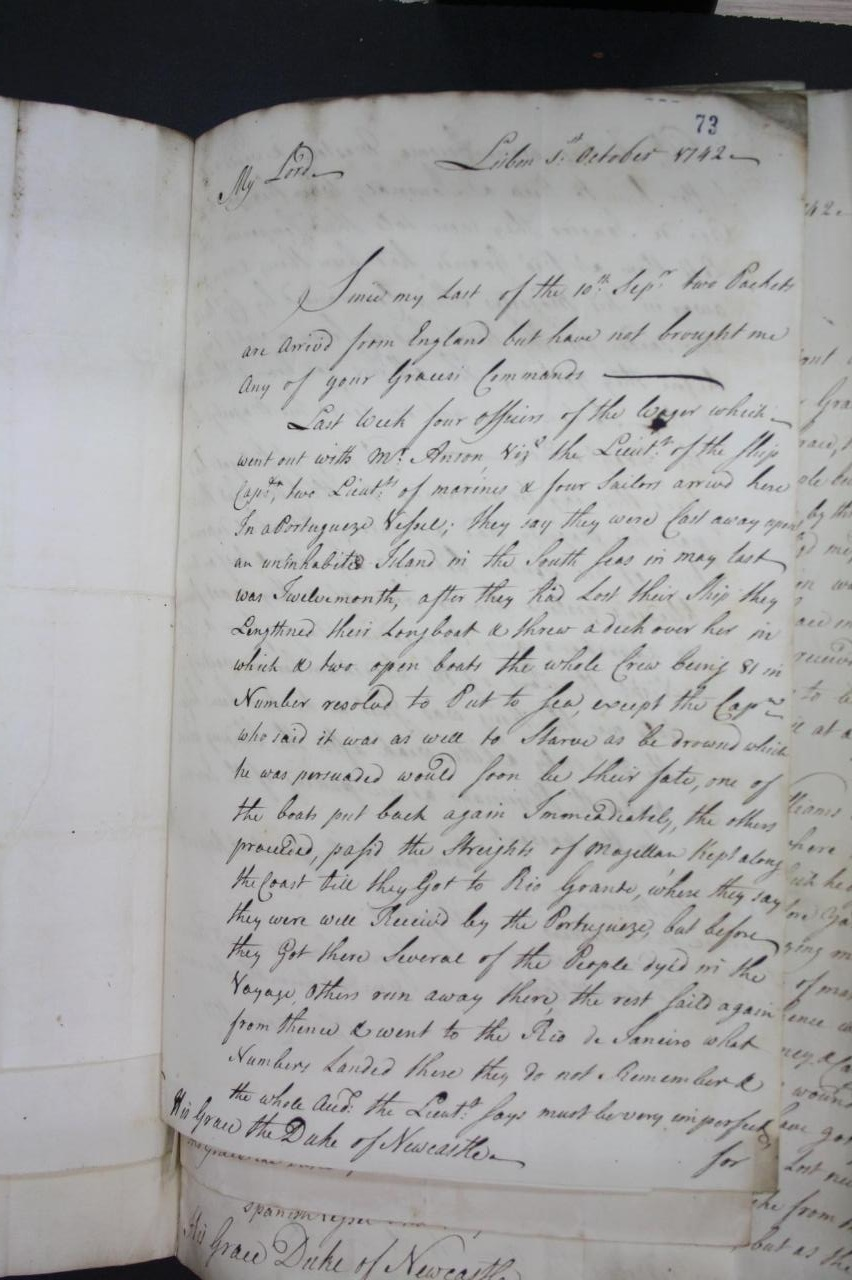
British Ambassador writes of Speedwell survivors arrival in Lisbon

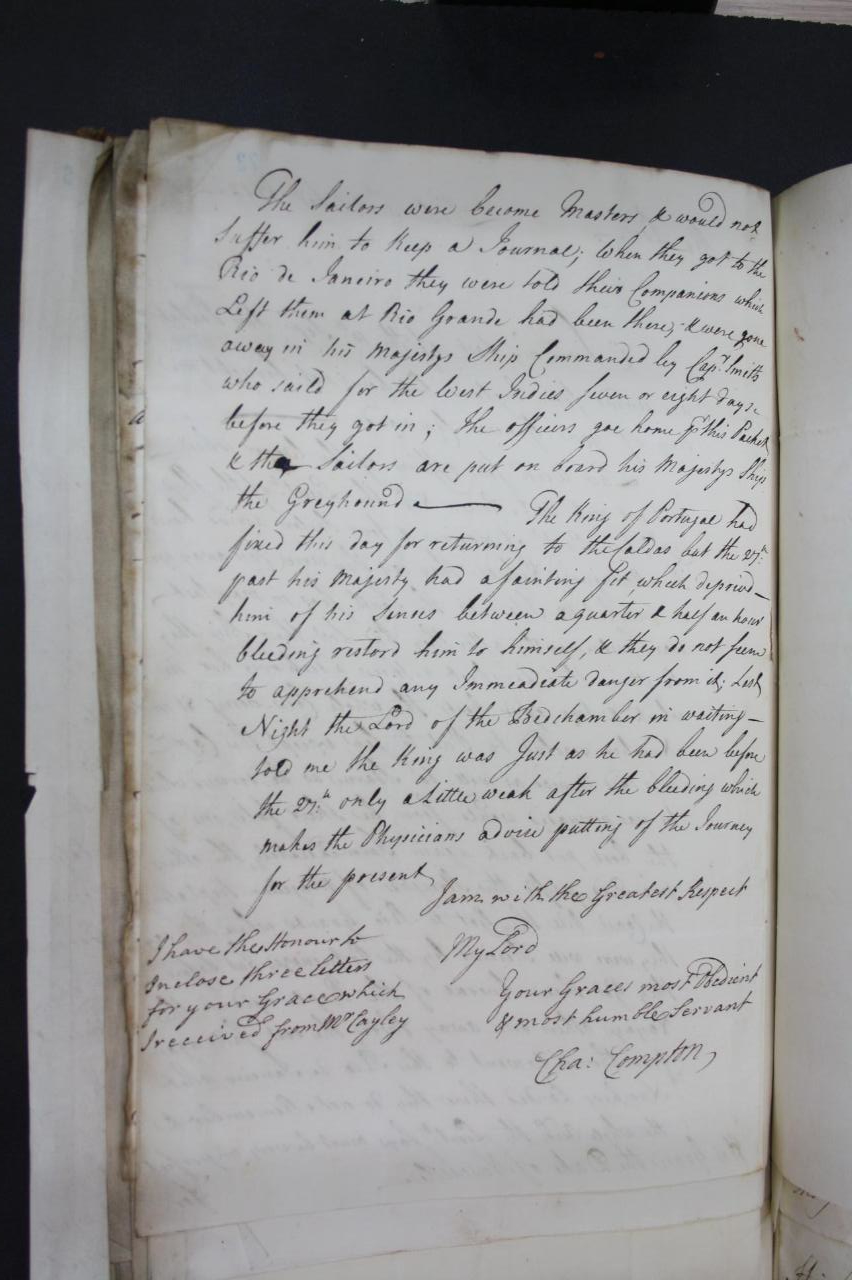
Baynes says he did not keep a journal as the men 'would not suffer it'.

The surviving mutineers had an anxious time before eventually securing passage to Rio de Janeiro on the brigantine Saint Catherine, which set sail on 28 March 1742. Once in Rio, internal and external diplomatic wrangling continually threatened to complicate their lives, if not their return to England. King did not help the situation, having formed a violent gang that repeatedly terrorised his former shipmates on various pretexts, causing them to move to the opposite side of the city to avoid King. After many episodes of fleeing their accommodations, Bulkeley, Cummins, and the cooper, John Young, eventually sought protection from Portuguese authorities, as related by Captain Stanley Walter Croucher Pack:

As soon as the ruffians had gone [King's gang], the terrified occupants left their house via the back wall and fled into the country. Early the next morning they called on the consul and asked for protection. He readily understood that they were all in mortal peril from the mad designs of the boatswain [King] and placed them under protection and undertook to get them on board a ship where they could work their passage.

The mutineers eventually secured passage to Bahia aboard the Saint Tubes, which set sail on 20 May 1742. They gladly left King behind to continue causing criminal havoc in Rio. On 11 September 1742, Saint Tubes left Bahia bound for Lisbon, and from there they embarked in HMS Stirling Castle on 20 December bound for Spithead, England. They arrived on New Year's Day 1743, after an absence of more than two years. Events were also reported back to London from the British consul in Lisbon, in a dispatch dated 1 October 1742 (see images):

Last week four officers of the Wager which went out with Mr Anson, viz the Lieutenant of the ship [illegible, Bulkeley?], two lieutenants of marines and four sailors arrived here in a Portuguese vessel; they say they were cast away upon an uninhabited island in the South Seas in May last twelvemonth, after they had lost their ship they lengthened their longboat and threw a deck over her in which & two open boats the whole crew being 81 in number resorted to put to sea, except their Captain who said it was as well to starve as be drowned which he was persuaded would be their fate [this is a lie]. One of the boats put back again immediately [the barge], the others proceeded, sailed the Straights of Magellan, kept along the coast 'till they got to Rio Grande, where they say they were well received by the Portuguese. But before they got there several of the people died in the voyage, others ran away there [meaning Isaac Morris and others, this is also a lie]. The rest sailed again from thence and went to Rio de Janeiro, what numbers landed there they do not remember. The whole event the Lieutenant [Baynes] says must be very important for [Page 2] the sailors were become masters and would not suffer him to keep a journal. When they got to the Rio de Janeiro there were lots of their companions who left them at Rio Grande had been there & were gone away in His Majesty's ship commanded by Captain Smith who sailed for the West Indies seven or eight days before they got in. The officers gone home of this Packet [HMS Stirling Castle] & the sailors are put on board His Majesty's ship the Greyhound.

Pack's book describes a similar report:

Arrival of some of the castaways from the loss of H.M.S. Wager in the South Pacific. Were well treated by Portuguese at Rio de Janeiro, but sailors were mutinous against their officers. King of Portugal has had another seizure and his departure for Caldas is postponed... etc."

Baynes rushed ahead of Bulkeley and Cummins to the Admiralty and gave an account of what happened to Wager, which reflected badly on Bulkeley and Cummins but not himself. Baynes was a weak man and an incompetent officer, as recorded by all who provided narratives of the shipwreck and mutiny. As a result of Baynes' report, Bulkeley and Cummins were detained aboard Stirling Castle for two weeks whilst the Admiralty decided how to act. It was eventually decided to release them and to defer any formal court-martial proceedings until the return of either Anson or Cheap. When Anson did return in 1744, it was decided that no trial would proceed until Cheap returned. Bulkeley asked the Admiralty for permission to publish his journal; it responded that it was his business and he could do as he liked. Bulkeley released a book containing his journal, but the initial reaction from some was that he should have been hanged as a mutineer.

Bulkeley found employment when he assumed command of a forty-gun privateer Saphire. It was not long before his competence and nerve brought him success as he tricked his way around a superior force of French frigates that his vessel encountered while cruising. As a result, Bulkeley's exploits were reported in popular London papers, and he gained some celebrity. He began thinking that it would not be long before the Admiralty would offer him the coveted command of a Royal Navy ship. On 9 April 1745, however, Cheap returned to England.

=== Survivors of Cheap's group return to England ===
By January 1742 (January 1743 in the modern calendar, the year changed on 25 March in those days), as Bulkeley was returning to Spithead, the four survivors of Cheap's group had spent seven months in Chacao. Nominal prisoners of the local governor, they were allowed to live with local hosts and were left unmolested. The biggest obstacle in Byron's efforts to return to England began with the old lady who initially looked after him (and her two daughters) in the countryside before his move to the town itself. All the ladies were fond of Byron and became extremely reluctant to let him leave, successfully persuading the governor to allow him to stay with them for a few extra weeks. He finally left, amidst many tears. Once in Chacao, Byron was also offered the hand in marriage of the richest heiress in the town, but he declined. On 2 January 1743, the group left on a ship bound for Valparaíso. Cheap and Hamilton removed to Santiago, as they were officers who had preserved their commissions; Byron and Campbell were jailed.

Byron and Campbell were confined in a single cell infested with insects and placed on a starvation diet. Many locals visited their cell, paying officials for the privilege of looking at the 'terrible Englishmen', people they had heard much about, but never seen before. However, the harsh conditions moved not only their curious visitors but also the sentry at their cell door, who allowed food and money to be taken to them. Eventually, Cheap's whole group made it to Santiago, where conditions were much better. They stayed there on parole for the rest of 1743 and 1744. Exactly why becomes clearer in Campbell's account:

The Spaniards are very proud, and dress extremely gay; particularly the women, who spend a great deal of money upon their persons and houses. They are a good sort of people, and very courteous to strangers. Their women are also fond of gentlemen from other countries, and of other nations."

After two years, the group was offered passage on a ship to Spain; all agreed, except Campbell. He chose to travel overland with some Spanish naval officers to Buenos Aires, and from there to connect with another ship also bound for Spain. Campbell deeply resented Cheap's giving him a lower cash allowance than he gave to Hamilton and Byron. Campbell was suspected of being edging toward marrying a Spanish colonial woman, which was against the rules of the Royal Navy at that time. Campbell was furious at this treatment. He wrote:

...the misunderstanding between me and the Captain, as already related, and since which we had not conversed together, induced me not to go home in the same ship with a man who had used me so ill; but rather to embark in a Spanish man-of-war then lying at Buenos Aires.

On 20 December 1744, Cheap, Hamilton, and Byron embarked on the French ship Lys, which had to return to Valparaíso after springing a leak. On 1 March 1744 (modern 1745), Lys set out for Europe, and after a good passage round the Horn she dropped anchor in Tobago in late June 1745. After managing to get lost and sail obliviously by night through the very dangerous island chain between Grenada and St Vincent, the ship headed for Puerto Rico. The crew was alarmed at seeing abandoned barrels from British warships, as Britain was now at war with France. After narrowly avoiding being captured off San Domingo, the ship made her way to Brest, arriving on 31 October 1744. After six months in Brest being virtually abandoned with no money, shelter, food, or clothing, the destitute group embarked for England on a Dutch ship. On 9 April 1745, they landed at Dover, three men of the twenty who had left in the barge with Cheap on 15 December 1741.

News of their arrival quickly reached the Admiralty and Bulkeley. Cheap went directly to London with his version of events. A court-martial was organised, with Bulkeley being at risk of execution.

=== Abandoned survivors of the Speedwell group return to England ===
Left by Bulkeley at Freshwater Bay, in the place where today stands the resort city of Mar del Plata, were eight men who were alone, starving, sickly and in a hostile and remote country. After a month of living on sea lions killed with stones to preserve ball and powder, the group began the 300-mile (480 km) trek north to Buenos Aires. Their greatest fear was the Tehuelche nomads, who were known to transit through the region. After a 60-mile (97 km) trek north in two days, they were forced to return to Freshwater Bay because of the lack of water resources. Once back, they decided to wait for the wet season before making another attempt. They became more settled at the bay, built a hut, tamed some puppies they took from a wild dog, and began raising pigs. One of the party spotted what they described as a 'tiger' reconnoitering their hut one night. Another sighting of a 'lion' shortly after this had the men hastily planning another attempt to walk to Buenos Aires (they actually saw a jaguar and a cougar).

One day, when most of the men were out hunting, the group returned to find the two left behind to mind the camp had been murdered, the hut torn down, and all their possessions taken. Two other men who were hunting elsewhere disappeared, and their dogs made their way back to the devastated camp. The four remaining men left Freshwater Bay for Buenos Aires, accompanied by sixteen dogs and two pigs.

The party eventually reached the mouth of the River Plate, but, unable to negotiate the marshes on the shores of Samborombon Bay, they were forced to make their way back to Freshwater Bay. Shortly afterwards, a large group of Tehuelches on horseback surrounded them, took them all prisoner, and enslaved them. After being bought and sold four times, they were eventually taken before Cangapol, a chieftain who led a loose confederation of nomad tribes dwelling between the rivers Negro and Lujan. When he learned they were English and at war with the Spanish, he treated them better. By the end of 1743, after eight months of being enslaved, they eventually told the chief that they wanted to return to Buenos Aires. Cangapol agreed but refused to give up John Duck, who was mulatto. An English trader in Montevideo, upon hearing of their plight, put up the ransom of $270 for the other three, and they were released.

On their arrival in Buenos Aires, the Spanish governor put the party in jail after they refused to convert to Catholicism. In early 1745, they were moved to the ship Asia, where they were to work as prisoners of war. After this, they were thrown in prison again, chained and placed on a bread and water diet for fourteen weeks, before a judge eventually ordered their release. Then Campbell, another of Wager's crew, arrived in town.

=== Campbell's overland trek to Buenos Aires ===
On 20 January 1745, Campbell and four Spanish naval officers set out across South America from Valparaíso to Buenos Aires. Using mules, the party trekked into the high Andes, where they faced precipitous mountains, severe cold, and, at times, serious altitude sickness. First, a mule slipped on an exposed path and was dashed onto rocks far below, then two mules froze to death on a particularly horrendous night of blizzards, and an additional twenty died of thirst or starvation on the remaining journey. After seven weeks travelling, the party eventually arrived in Buenos Aires.

=== Campbell and the Freshwater Bay survivors return to England ===
It took five months for Campbell to get out of Buenos Aires, where he was twice confined in a fort for periods of several weeks. Eventually the governor sent him to Montevideo, which was just 100 miles (160 km) across the River Plate. It was here that the three Freshwater Bay survivors—Midshipman Isaac Morris, Seaman Samuel Cooper and John Andrews—were languishing as prisoners of war aboard Asia, along with sixteen other English sailors from another ship. While his fellow shipmates were treated harshly and confined aboard Asia, Campbell, who had voluntarily converted to Catholicism, wined and dined with various captains on the social circuit of Montevideo.

All four Wager survivors departed for Spain aboard Asia at the end of October 1745, but the passage was not without incident. Having been at sea three days, eleven Indian crew members on board mutinied against their barbaric treatment by the Spanish officers. They killed twenty Spaniards and wounded another twenty before briefly taking control of the ship (which had a total crew of over five hundred). Eventually, the Spaniards worked to reassert control, and through a 'lucky shot', according to Morris, they killed the Indian chief Orellana. His followers all jumped overboard rather than submit to Spanish retribution.

Asia dropped anchor at the port Corcubion, near Cape Finisterre, on 20 January 1746. The authorities chained together Morris, Cooper, and Andrews and put them in jail. Campbell went to Madrid for questioning. After four months held captive in awful conditions, the three Freshwater Bay survivors were eventually released to Portugal, from where they sailed for England, arriving in London on 5 July 1746. Bulkeley had to confront men he assumed had died on a desolate coastline thousands of miles away.

Campbell's insistence that he had not entered the service of the Spanish Navy, as Cheap and Byron had believed, was apparently confirmed when he arrived in London during early May 1746, shortly after Cheap. Campbell went straight to the Admiralty, where he was promptly dismissed from the service for his change in religion. His hatred for Cheap had, if anything, intensified. After all he had been through, he completes his account of this incredible story thus:

Most of the hardships I suffered in following the fortunes of Captain Cheap were the consequence of my voluntary attachment to that gentleman. In reward for this the Captain has approved himself the greatest Enemy I have in the world. ... His ungenerous Usage of me forced me to quit his Company, and embark for Europe in a Spanish ship rather than a French one.

=== Court martial into the loss of Wager ===
Proceedings for a full court martial to inquire into the loss of Wager were initiated once Cheap had returned and made his report to the Admiralty. All Wager survivors were ordered to report aboard HMS Prince George at Spithead for the court martial. On hearing this, Bulkeley arranged to dine with the Deputy Marshal of the Admiralty (the enforcing officer of the Royal Navy command) but kept his true identity concealed. He wrote about his prepared conversation with the Deputy Marshal at Paul's Head Tavern in Cateaton Street:

Desiring to know his opinion in regard to the Officers of the Wager, as their Captain was come home; for that I had a near relation which was an Officer that came in the long-boat from Brazil, and it would give me concern if he would suffer: His answer was that he believ'd that we should be hang'd. To which I replied, for God's Sake for what, for not being drown'd? And is a Murderer at last come home to their Accuser? I have carefully perused the Journal, and can't conceive that they have been guilty of Piracy, Mutiny, nor any Thing else to deserve it. It looks to me as if their Adversaries have taken up arms against the Power of the Almighty, for delivering them.

At which point the Marshal responded:

Sir, they have been guilty of such things to Captain Cheap whilst a Prisoner, that I believe the Gunner and Carpenter will be hang'd if no Body else.

Bulkeley revealed his true identity to the Marshal, who immediately arrested him. Upon arrival aboard Prince George, he sent some of his friends to visit Cheap to gauge his mood and intentions. Their report gave Bulkeley little comfort. Cheap was in a vindictive frame of mind, telling them:

Gentlemen, I have nothing to say for nor against Villains, until the Day of Tryal, and then it is not in my Power to be off from hanging them.

Upon securing the main players, a trial was set for Tuesday, 15 April 1746, presided by Vice Admiral of the Red Squadron James Steuart. Much of what happened on the day land was first sighted off Patagonia, as recounted here, came out in sworn testimonies, with statements from Cheap, Byron, Hamilton, Bulkeley, Cummins, and King (who had also returned to England, under unknown circumstances) and several other crew members.

Cheap, although keen to charge those who abandoned him aboard Speedwell with mutiny, decided not to make any accusations when it was suggested to him that any such claims would lead to his being accused of murdering Cozens. None of the witnesses was aware at this point that the Admiralty had decided not to examine events after the ship foundered as part of the scope of the court martial proceedings. After testimony and questioning, the men were all promptly acquitted of any wrongdoing, except for Baynes. He was admonished for not reporting the carpenter's sighting of land to the west to the captain or letting go of the anchor when ordered.

=== Aftermath ===
The mutineers argued that, since their pay stopped on the day their vessel was wrecked, they were no longer under naval law. Pack, in his book about the mutiny, describes this and the Admiralty's decision not to investigate events after Wager was lost in more detail:

Their Lordships knew that a conviction of mutiny would be unpopular with the country. Things were bad with the Navy in April 1746. Their Lordships were out of favour. One of the reasons for this was their harsh treatment of Admiral Vernon, a popular figure with the public... The defence that the Mutineers had was that as their wages automatically stopped when the ship was lost, they were no longer under naval law. Existence of such a misconception could lead, in time of enemy action or other hazard, to anticipation that the ship was already lost. Anson realised the danger and corrected this misconception. As Lord Commissioner he removed any further doubt in 1747. An Act was passed 'for extending the discipline of the Navy to crews of his majesty's ships, wrecked lost or taken, and continuing to receive wages upon certain conditions...' The survivors of the Wager were extremely lucky not to be convicted of mutiny and owe their acquittal not only to the unpopularity of the Board, but to the strength of public opinion, to the fact that their miraculous escapes had captured the public fancy.

Cheap was promoted to the rank of post captain and appointed to command the forty-gun ship Lark, demonstrating that the Admiralty considered his many faults secondary to his steadfast loyalty and sense of purpose. He captured a valuable prize soon after, which allowed him to marry in 1748. He died in 1752. His service records, reports, and will are preserved in the National Archives.

Byron was promoted to the rank of master and commander and appointed to command the twenty-gun ship Syren. He eventually rose to the rank of vice admiral. Byron had a varied and significant active service history, which included a circumnavigation of the globe. He married in 1748 and raised a family. He died in 1786. His grandson George Gordon Byron, better known as Lord Byron, became a poet of great fame and lasting literary importance; he sometimes alluded to his grandfather's experiences in his darker poetic works.

Baynes' service records predate the sailing of Anson's squadron. Upon his return to England after the Wager affair, he never served at sea again. Instead, in February 1745, before the court martial, he was given a position onshore running a naval store yard in Clay near the Sea, Norfolk. Apart from some reports he made of thieving from his yard, his life did not create other records. He remained in this capacity until he died in 1758.

Shortly after the court-martial, Bulkeley was offered command of the cutter Royal George, which he declined, thinking her "too small to keep to the sea". He was right in his assessment, as the vessel subsequently foundered in the Bay of Biscay, with the loss of all hands. Bulkeley eventually emigrated to the Colony of Pennsylvania where his book was re-published in 1757. Bulkeley thereafter vanished from the historical record, and his final fate is unknown.

Campbell completed his narrative of the Wager affair by denying that he had entered the service of the Spanish Navy; however, in the same year his book was published, a report was filed against him. Commodore Edward Legge (formerly captain of Severn in Anson's original squadron) reported that whilst cruising in Portuguese waters, he encountered a certain Alexander Campbell in port, formerly of the Royal Navy and HMS Wager, enlisting English seamen and sending them overland to Cádiz to join the Spanish service.
