= Wager Island =

Remote, uninhabited island of Chilean Patagonia

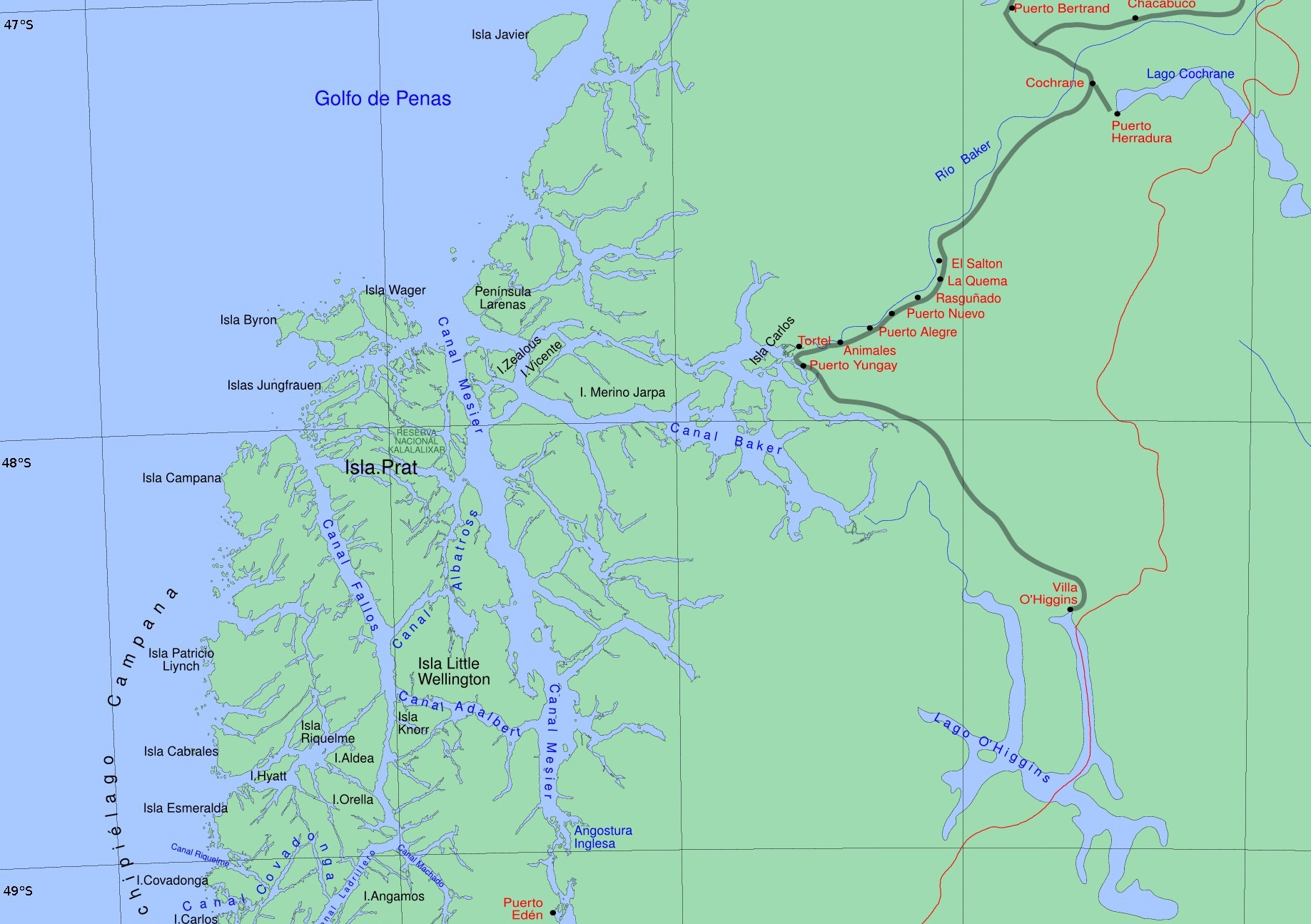
- Map of Chilean Patagonia (latitudes 47°S to 49°S). Wager Island forms the northwestern terminus of the Messier Channel, while the Larenas Peninsula forms the northeastern terminus.

- Location of the commune of Tortel in Aysén Region, Chile

- Location of Wager Island in Chile

Geography
- Location: Capitán Prat Province, Aysén Region, Chile
- Coordinates: 47°43′27″S 74°57′37″W
- Archipelago: Guayaneco Archipelago
- Area: 105 km^{2} (41 sq mi)
- Highest elevation: 586 m (1923 ft)
- Highest point: Monte Wager

Administration
- Chile

Wager Island (Spanish: Isla Wager) is an uninhabited island in Guayaneco Archipelago, a remote part of western Patagonia. Located 1,600 kilometres (990 miles) south of Santiago, the island is part of Capitán Prat Province of the Aysén Region, Chile. The island was the location of the Wager Mutiny, which took place in October 1741 after the wreck of the British warship HMS Wager.

== History ==
=== Early history ===
The Guayaneco Archipelago is thought to have been a cohabitational contact zone between different canoe-faring indigenous peoples living north and south of it. Anthropologist John Montgomery Cooper points out that it possibly made up a "meeting ground of quasi-friendly bilingual tribes".

European explorers began to map this area after the discovery of the Strait of Magellan in 1520. Members of the 1553 naval expedition of Francisco de Ulloa were the first Europeans to encounter the Chono people. The islands were first reached by Jesuits based in Chiloé in 1613. False rumors of European settlements near the Straits of Magellan prompted the Spanish to send an expedition led by Bartolomé Gallardo in 1674–1675, and later the Antonio de Vea expedition of 1675–1676.

Northern tribes such as the Chonos, Huilliche, and the Spanish of Chiloé called the sea-faring people of the area of Wager Island "Caucahue" in colonial times. They spoke a language different from Chono and according to historian Ximena Urbina and co-workers, the Caucahue are essentially ancient Kawésqar.

=== Wreck of HMS Wager ===
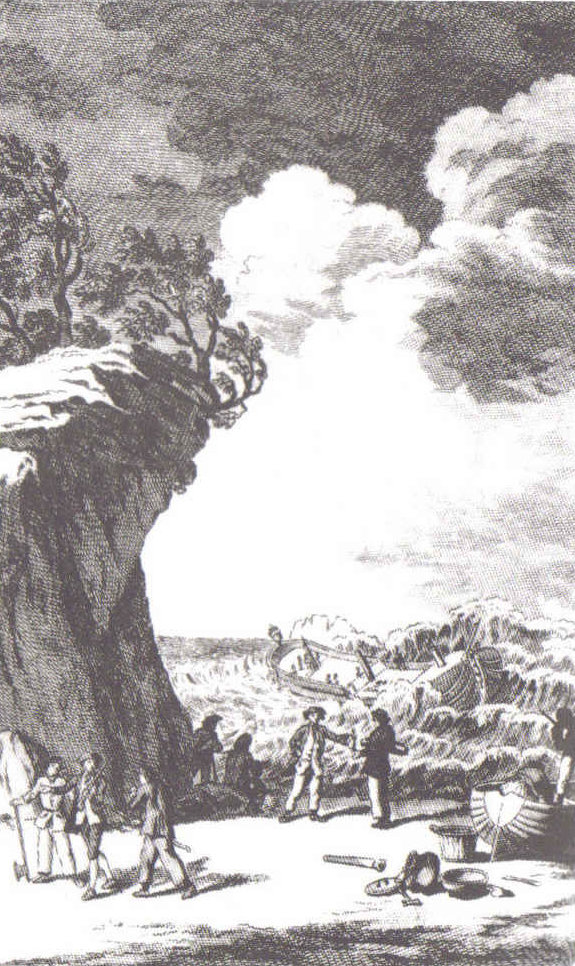
The Wreck of the Wager, the frontispiece from John Byron's account

On 18 September 1740, the British warship HMS Wager (a part of Commodore George Anson's squadron) departed St Helens with a crew of 160 men along with a large number of invalids and marines. After becoming embayed in the Gulf of Penas just south of the Taitao Peninsula, Wager ran aground at what would become known as Wager Island on 14 May 1741. Initially, about 140 men survived, making it to the island in ship's boats. By the end of June, many of these men had died on the island from starvation, drowning, hypothermia, and trauma.

After many arduous months, two groups of castaways eventually departed Wager Island. The first group, consisting of 81 mutineers, departed Wager Island on 13 October 1741. Of this group, 30 men arrived in Río Grande, Brazil, on 28 January 1742. One of these men died shortly after arriving at Río Grande.

A second group of men (11 castaways and one Indian guide) departed Wager Island on 6 March 1742. Guided by the Chono cheftain Martín Olleta, the group navigated through Presidente Ríos Lake in the interior of Taitao Peninsula instead of rounding to the west of the treacherous Tres Montes Peninsula. Of this group, three survivors (Captain David Cheap, midshipman John Byron, and midshipman Alexander Campbell) arrived in Chiloé Island, Chile, in early June 1742. One final survivor (Marine Lieutenant Thomas Hamilton) was rescued and brought to Chiloé Island by a Spanish search party about three months later. Altogether, only 36 men returned alive to Britain, according to The Wager Disaster (2015) by Rear Admiral C. H. Layman.

=== Fate of the wreck of HMS Wager ===
From late 1742 to 1769, the Spanish and the local indigenous people conducted multiple salvage expeditions on the wreck of HMS Wager. A Jesuit priest named Pedro Flores conducted a small salvage operation in late 1742, in which he recovered nearly 100 kg (220 lb) of iron. The first large-scale salvage effort was the expedition of Mateo Abraham Evrard, which took place in 1743. Among the items recovered from this operation were ten iron six-pound cannons, four bronze three-pound cannons, an anchor, more than 100 cannonballs, 1000 musket balls, and three copper cauldrons.

In 1779, Spanish missionaries Fray Benito Marín and Fray Julián Real found an indigenous settlement consisting of four dwellings that had been constructed on the beach close to the site of the wreck.

The Scientific Exploration Society mounted an expedition in 2006 to locate what remained of the wreck. The team found, in shallow water, a 5 square metres (54 square feet) piece of wooden hull planking that appeared to be consistent with the construction of Wager.

== Geography ==
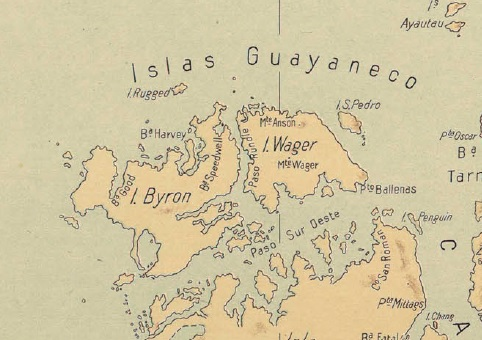
Detail of the "Centennial Atlas", published by the Land Survey Office of the Government of Chile in 1910

Wager Island is located in the Guayaneco Archipelago, 1,600 kilometres (990 miles) south of Santiago, in the southern part of the Gulf of Penas of the southern Pacific Ocean. It is 18 kilometres (11 miles) long on its NW-SE axis and 10 kilometres (6.2 miles) wide. Of the two main islands that make up the Guayaneco Archipelago, Byron Island is the larger, and Wager Island is the smaller. It is separated from Byron Island by Paso Rundle, and separated from Islote San Pedro by Bahía Acosta. Wager Island and Islote San Pedro form the northwestern terminus of the Messier Channel, while the Larenas Peninsula forms the northeastern terminus. There is a lighthouse (NGA 2044) on Islote San Pedro. The Messier Channel is regularly traversed by large cargo ships and cruiseferries.

Because the island is located between 46° and 60° south of the equator, it is classified as a subantarctic island. During the Llanquihue glaciation, advancing glaciers caused the forests to retreat far to the north. The region was gradually reforested starting about 10,000 years ago as the climate warmed and the glaciers retreated. Deglaciation was almost complete around 14,000 years ago. Today, Wager Island consists of a series of highlands and ravines and has many steep headlands and promontories. Notable peaks include Monte Anson, with its summit at 377 metres (1,237 feet), and Monte Wager, with its summit at 586 metres (1,923 feet). The lower slopes of these mountains are covered with Magellanic subpolar forests.

The nearest settlement is the village of Caleta Tortel, which is situated 107 kilometres (66 miles) to the east, while the nearest airport is Caleta Tortel Airport. Apart from Caleta Tortel, the next closest settlement is the village of Villa Puerto Edén, 165 kilometres (103 miles) to the south. Villa Puerto Edén is among the most remote villages of southern Chile.

== Geology ==
Wager Island is one of a series of islands and deep bays that are the remnants of a now-submerged coastal range. The island is of igneous origin, and dates from the tertiary period. It is the product of the same geological phenomenon that caused the development of the Chilean Coast Range and the Andes. Passing through Paso Suroeste—off the southern coast of Wager Island— is the Liquiñe-Ofqui Fault system, a major geological fault that exhibits current seismicity.

Three tectonic plates (the Antarctica, South America and Nazca) meet at the Chile Triple Junction (CTJ), near the Taitao Peninsula. The Nazca and Antarctic plates are moving to the east, while the South American plate is moving to the west. This situation has resulted in the subsidence of the western edge of the South American plate, lowering it to its current level and producing the large number of islands that exist there today. Subduction of the Chile Ridge beneath the South American plate at the CTJ has caused a sequence of three ridge–continent collisions, starting about 5 million years ago.

During the Llanquihue glaciation, the Guayaneco Archipelago was covered with glaciers, which carved deep valleys into the islands. Today, these glacial troughs are deep channels (such as the Messier Channel and the Fallos Channel) and fjords.

== Flora and fauna ==
Wager Island falls within the terrestrial ecoregion known as the Magellanic subpolar forests. This is a temperate broadleaf and mixed forests ecoregion within the neotropical realm. Due to its climate and recent glaciation, biodiversity on the island is somewhat limited. Environmental conditions on the island are characterized by cool temperatures, high rainfall, strong subpolar winds, and rocky ground with generally thin soil and poor drainage. Accordingly, most of the terrain is Magellanic moorland, peatlands and bogs consisting of mosses, grasses, cushion plants, and dwarf shrubs. Depending on which criteria are used, Magellanic moorland may be classified as either tundra or heathland.

== Climate ==
Climate data for Wager Island (San Pedro)
Month	Jan	Feb	Mar	Apr	May	Jun	Jul	Aug	Sep	Oct	Nov	Dec	Year
Mean daily maximum °C (°F)	14.6 (58.3)	14.9 (58.8)	13.8 (56.8)	11.8 (53.2)	9.9 (49.8)	8.5 (47.3)	7.9 (46.2)	8.2 (46.8)	9.6 (49.3)	10.9 (51.6)	12.2 (54.0)	13.4 (56.1)	11.3 (52.4)
Daily mean °C (°F)	11.2 (52.2)	11.5 (52.7)	10.5 (50.9)	9.0 (48.2)	7.6 (45.7)	6.0 (42.8)	5.3 (41.5)	5.5 (41.9)	6.6 (43.9)	7.6 (45.7)	9.0 (48.2)	10.3 (50.5)	8.3 (47.0)
Mean daily minimum °C (°F)	8.0 (46.4)	8.3 (46.9)	7.1 (44.8)	6.0 (42.8)	4.6 (40.3)	3.3 (37.9)	2.9 (37.2)	3.1 (37.6)	3.9 (39.0)	4.8 (40.6)	6.0 (42.8)	6.9 (44.4)	5.4 (41.7)
Average precipitation mm (inches)	314.2 (12.37)	323.8 (12.75)	329.4 (12.97)	325.1 (12.80)	314.9 (12.40)	298.9 (11.77)	309.3 (12.18)	259.5 (10.22)	233.9 (9.21)	276.8 (10.90)	282.7 (11.13)	287.7 (11.33)	3,556.2 (140.03)
Source: Meteorología Interactiva

== Gallery ==

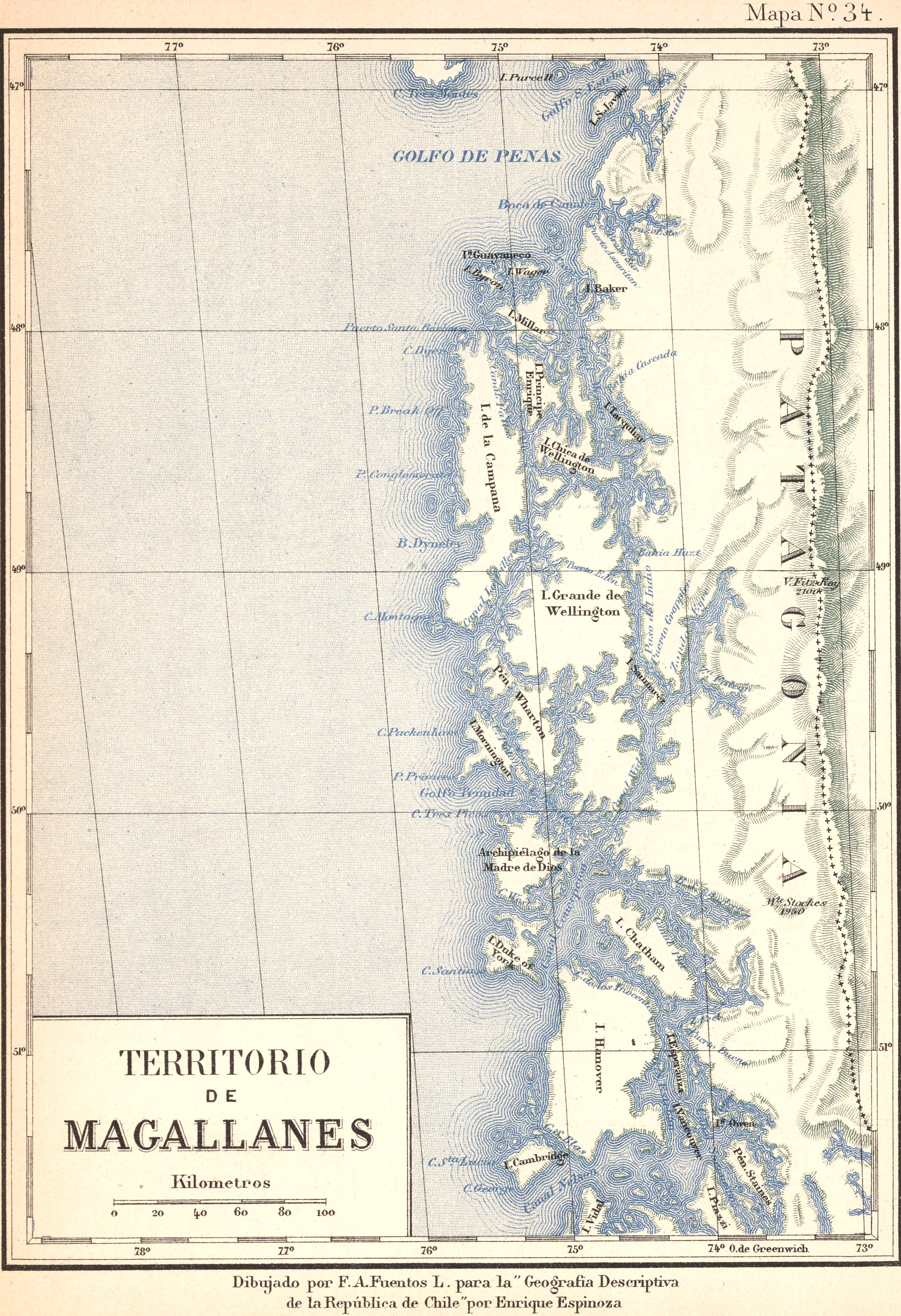

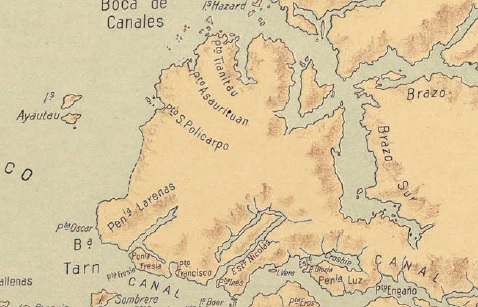

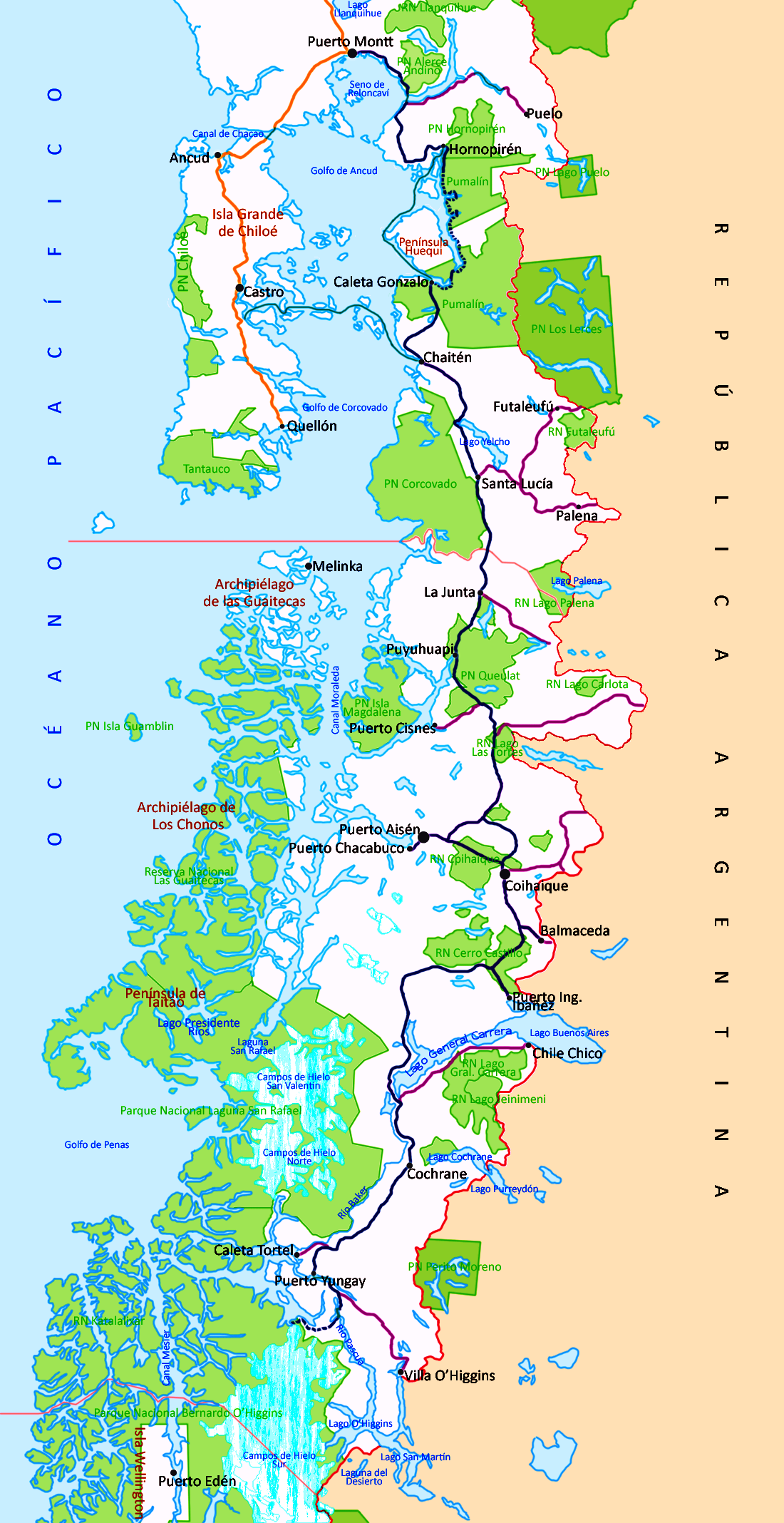

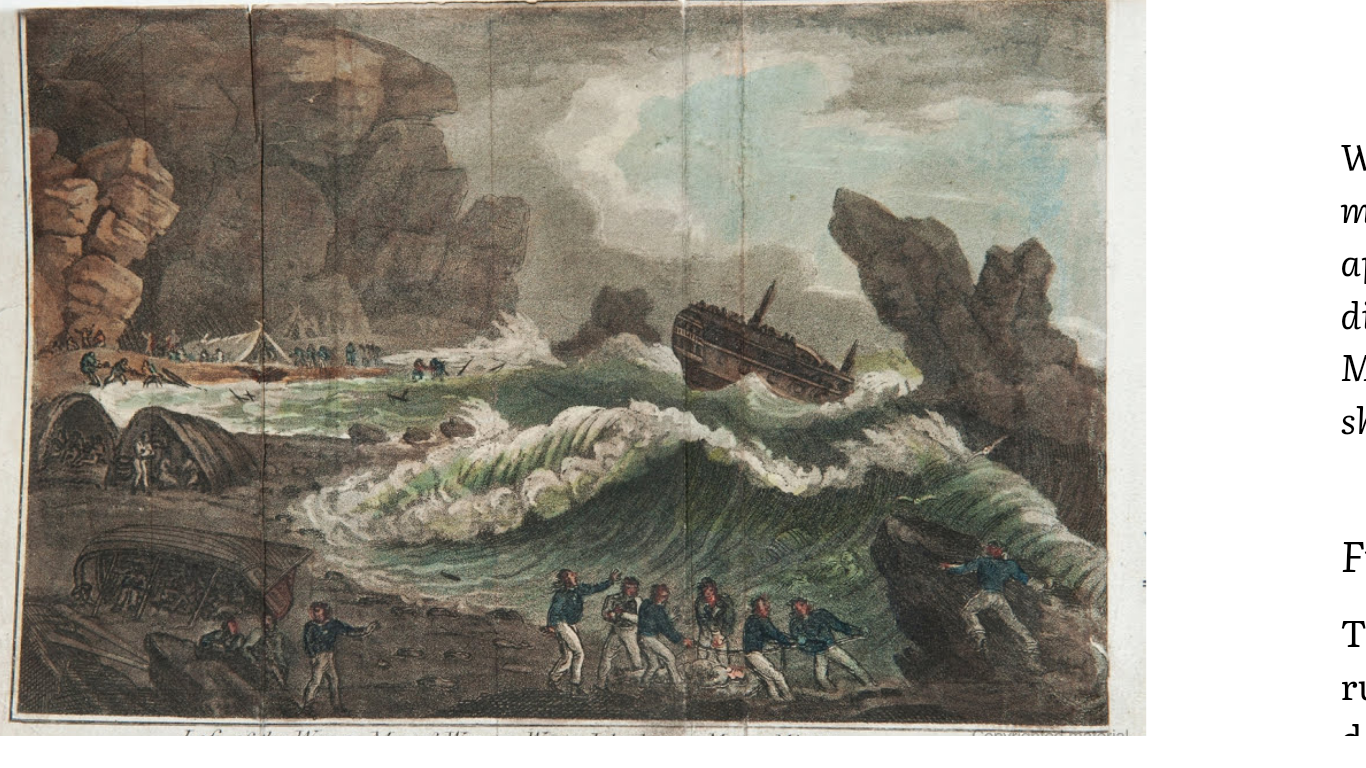

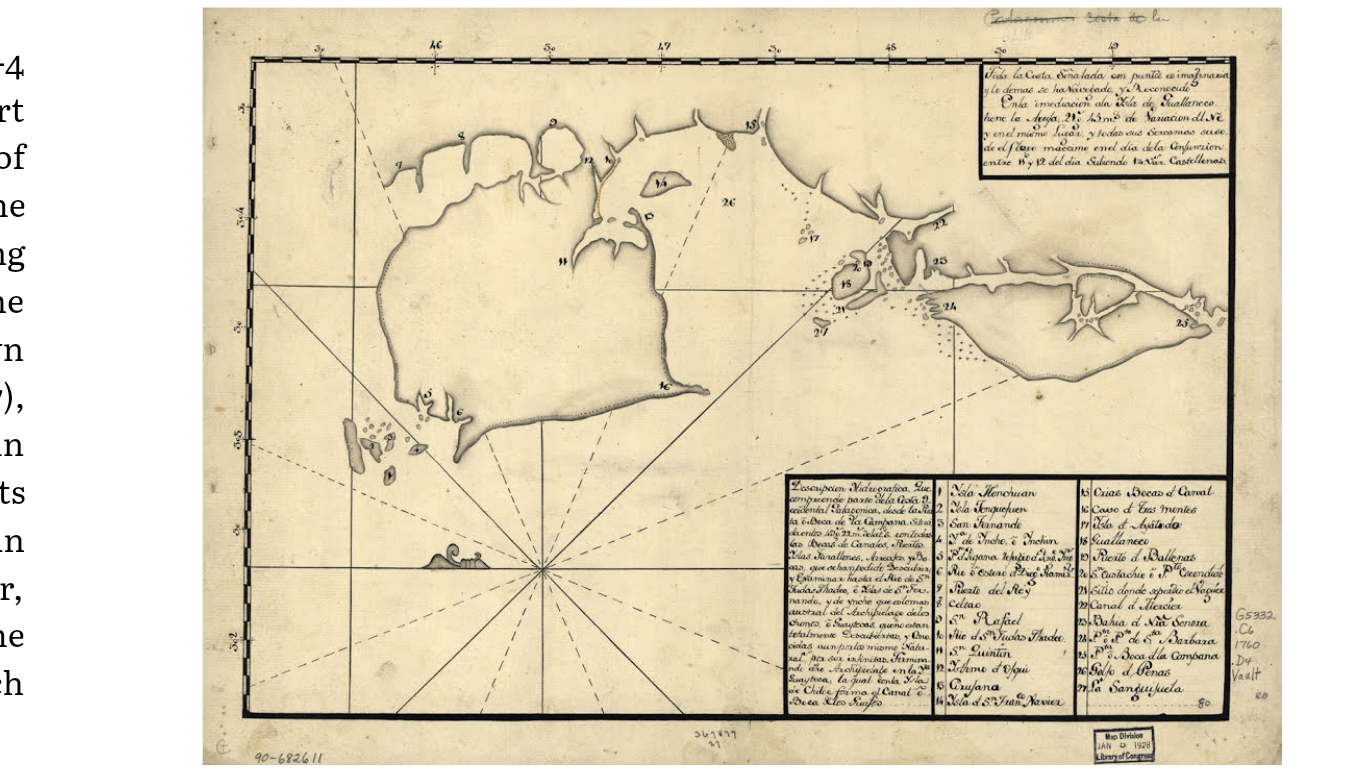

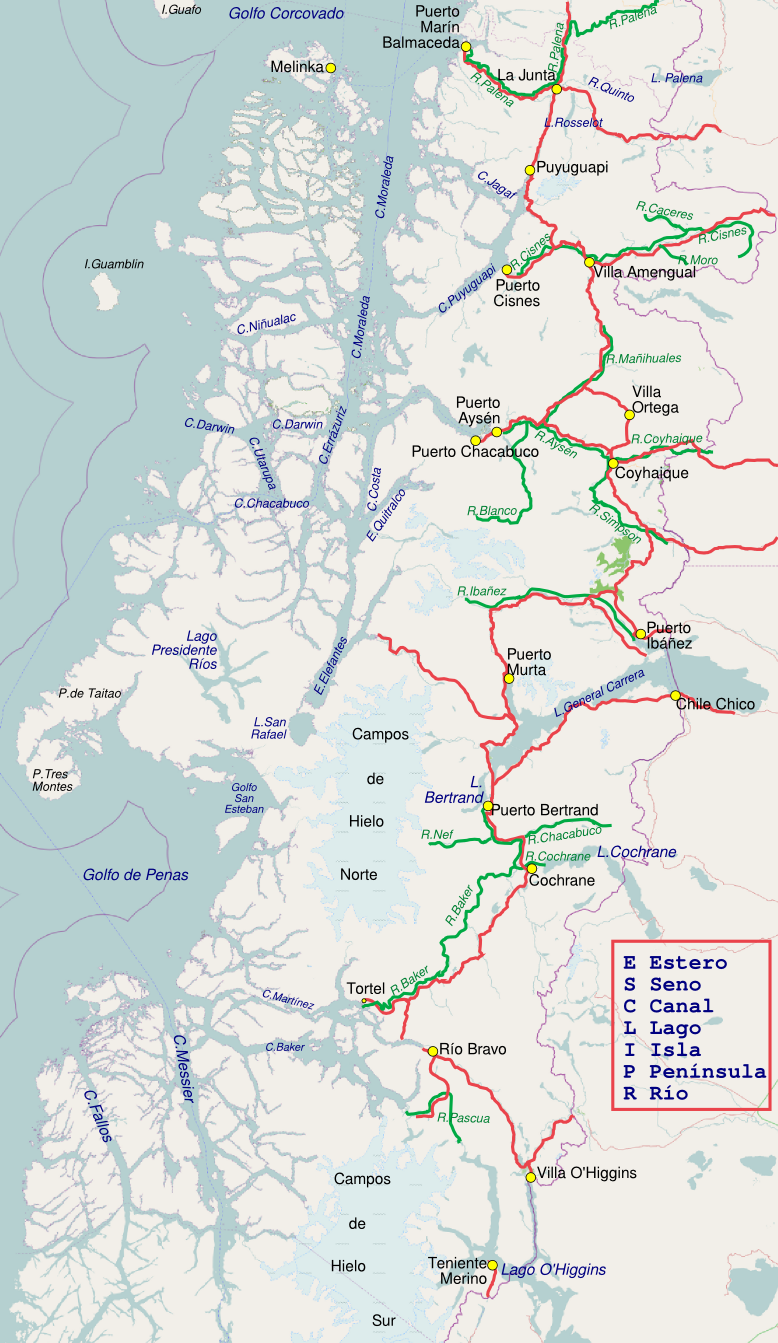

== See also ==
- Fjords and channels of Chile
- George Anson's voyage around the world
- List of islands of Chile
- The Unknown Shore

== Bibliography ==
- Anson, George (1748). Walter, Richard (ed.). A Voyage Round the World in the years MDCCXL, I, II, III, IV. London: John & Paul Knapton.
- Bulkeley, John; Cummins, John (1743). A voyage to the South-Seas, in the years 1740-1. London: Jacob Robinson.
- Byron, John (1768). The narrative of the Honourable John Byron. London: S. Baker & G. Leigh.
- Cooper, John M. (1917). Analytical and Critical Bibliography of the Tribes of Tierra Del Fuego and Adjacent Territory. Bulletin 63. Washington, DC: Bureau of American Ethnology, Smithsonian Institution.
- Grann, David (2023). The Wager: A Tale of Shipwreck, Mutiny and Murder. New York: Doubleday. ISBN 978-0385534277.
- Layman, C. H. (2015). The Wager disaster: mayhem, mutiny and murder in the south seas. London: Uniform Press. ISBN 978-1910065501.
- Longton, R.E. (1988). Biology of Polar Bryophytes and Lichens. Studies in Polar Research. Vol. 1. Cambridge, England: Cambridge University Press. ISBN 0521250153.
- Pack, S. W. C. (1960). Admiral Lord Anson: the story of Anson's voyage and naval events of his day. London: Cassell & Company.
- Pack, S. W. C. (1964). The Wager Mutiny. London: Alvin Redman.
- Paine, Ralph Delahaye (1921). Lost Ships and Lonely Seas. New York: The Century Company.
- Trivero Rivera, Alberto (2005). Los primeros pobladores de Chiloé: Génesis del horizonte mapuche [The first settlers of Chiloé: Genesis of the Mapuche horizon] (PDF) (in Spanish). Uppsala: Ñuke Mapuförlaget. ISBN 91-89629-28-0.
