= John Bulkeley =

John Bulkeley may refer to:

- John Bulkeley (Royal Navy), see HMS Wager (1739)
- John Bulkeley (MP), English MP
- John D. Bulkeley, US Admiral
