= Anna (1739 ship) =

British merchant and naval vessel

History
- Name: Anna
- Builder: John Gorill and John Parke, Liverpool
- Fate: Broken-up 18 August 1741
- Notes: See George Anson's voyage around the world for details of final voyage Reference for career details

General characteristics
- Class & type: Storeship
- Tons burthen: 400
- Complement: 16
- Armament: 8 guns

Anna was a merchant vessel originally employed as a collier taking coal from Yorkshire to London. The Admiralty chartered her in 1739 and subsequently purchased her to carry additional stores for the squadron of Commodore George Anson on his voyage around the world in 1740–44. She was often referred to as 'Anna Pink', as a 'Pink' is a type of ship with a narrow stern. She lost company with the squadron on 24 April 1741, but rejoined it at the Juan Fernández Islands on 16 August 1741 (Julian calendar) after sheltering for two months in a natural harbour on the South Chilean coast. A subsequent survey found her timbers were too badly damaged for a re-fit, therefore her stores and crew were distributed about the squadron and she was scuttled on 18 August 1741 in Cumberland Bay, Juan Fernández.

== Final voyage ==
By early April 1741, Anson's squadron was rounding the Horn and in very bad weather was struggling to make enough westerly to clear Tierra del Fuego. Anna and Pearl briefly became separated from the squadron. In this event, orders were to rendezvous at the island of Socorro (now Guamblin Island). By 13 April, she had regained visual contact with the squadron, and that night lookouts on Anna spotted land to the north, which was the western extremity of Isla Noir, off Tierra del Fuego. She fired her cannon and set of rocket lights to warn the rest of the squadron, which turned around and beat-off the coast before making more westerly to clear land. This saved the squadron from being wrecked on a lee-shore.

On 24 April, the squadron became dispersed in a severe storm and Anna found herself alone. Her Master, Mr Gerrard, therefore followed orders and tried to make for Socorro Island. As she approached the latitude of the rendezvous in mid-May, another westerly gale forced Anna towards the coast, threatening to wreck her. The crew dropped anchors in an attempt to avert disaster but they refused to hold. Just as being wrecked appeared unavoidable, a small opening appeared, so the anchors were cut away and the ship steered through two towering cliffs into a fine natural harbour.

Anna remained there for two months whilst the crew gathered fresh food and recovered from the effects of scurvy. Except for one indigenous family, the area was uninhabited; however the Master didn't fire the evening gun in case there were Spanish settlers nearby which would be alerted to the presence of British ships in the Pacific.

After this short stop to recuperate and repair the ship, Anna left her bay, which is to this day still known as Bahía Anna Pink and made for the secondary rendezvous location, the island of Juan Fernandez. The core of the squadron was indeed at Juan Fernandez, also recuperating from the exertions of rounding the Horn. They were minus Pearl and Severn, which had turned back for England after being separated from the squadron, and Wager, which was wrecked on the coast of Wager Island 80 miles (130 km) south of Bahía Anna Pink on 14 May 1741. Anna rejoined Anson's squadron on 28 August.

The squadron did not have enough stores to fully repair Anna for the continued voyage, therefore her stores of food, which were desperately needed, were removed and she was broken up. The relationship between some of her crew and the Master must have been strained however, as some petitioned to be removed from Gloucester and sent aboard Centurion, which Anson granted.

The story of Anna made a lasting impression on the First Lord of the Admiralty, John Montagu, 4th Earl of Sandwich as in 1772 when the Admiralty was organising Cook's second voyage, Joseph Banks was dismayed at the small size of the vessel proposed by Cook, Resolution; however, the First Lord commented, "The Anna, a collier like Resolution, did get round [Cape Horn] and made her way thro these stormy seas, which were so difficult to resist'."

Thus the performance of Anna confirmed the selection of Resolution for Cook's second voyage and is specifically mentioned in the diary entry of Charles Darwin on 4 January 1835 when his ship HMS Beagle entered Bahía Anna Pink.
