= Presidente Ríos Lake =

Lake in Chile

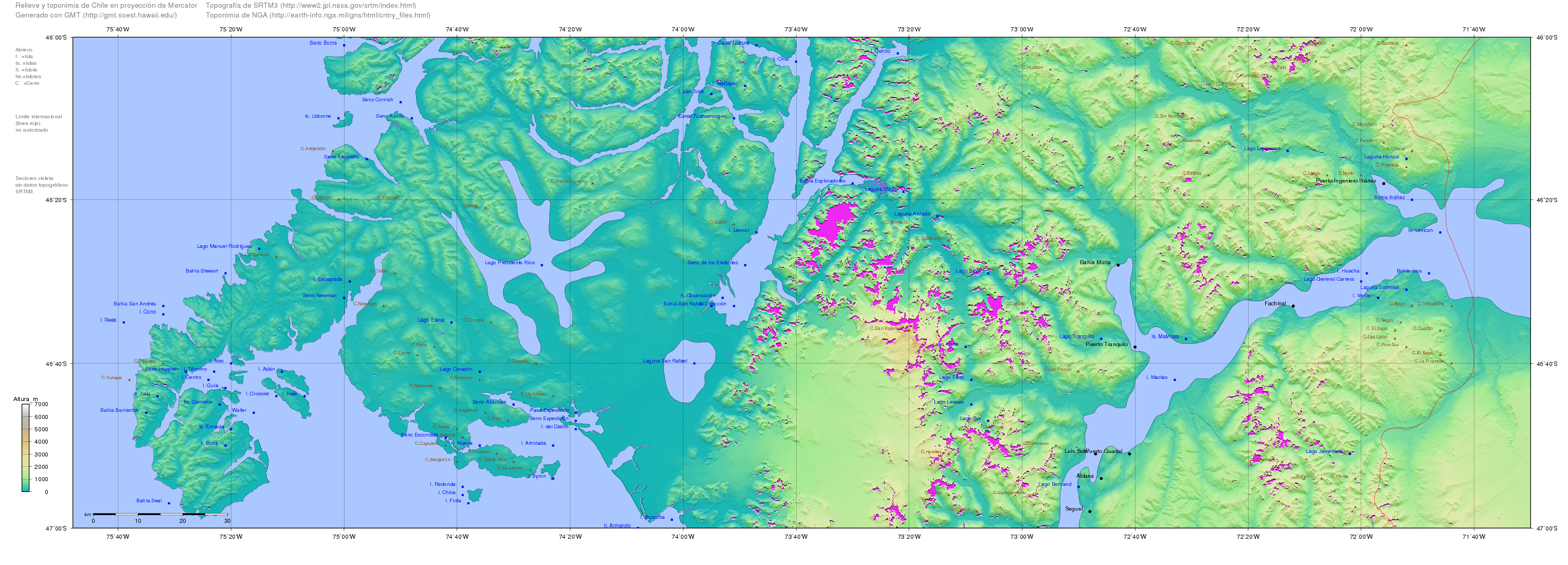
- The Presidente Ríos Lake is on the left half of the image. The SRTM map doesn't show the (existent) connection between the Laguna San Rafael and the Moraleda Channel.

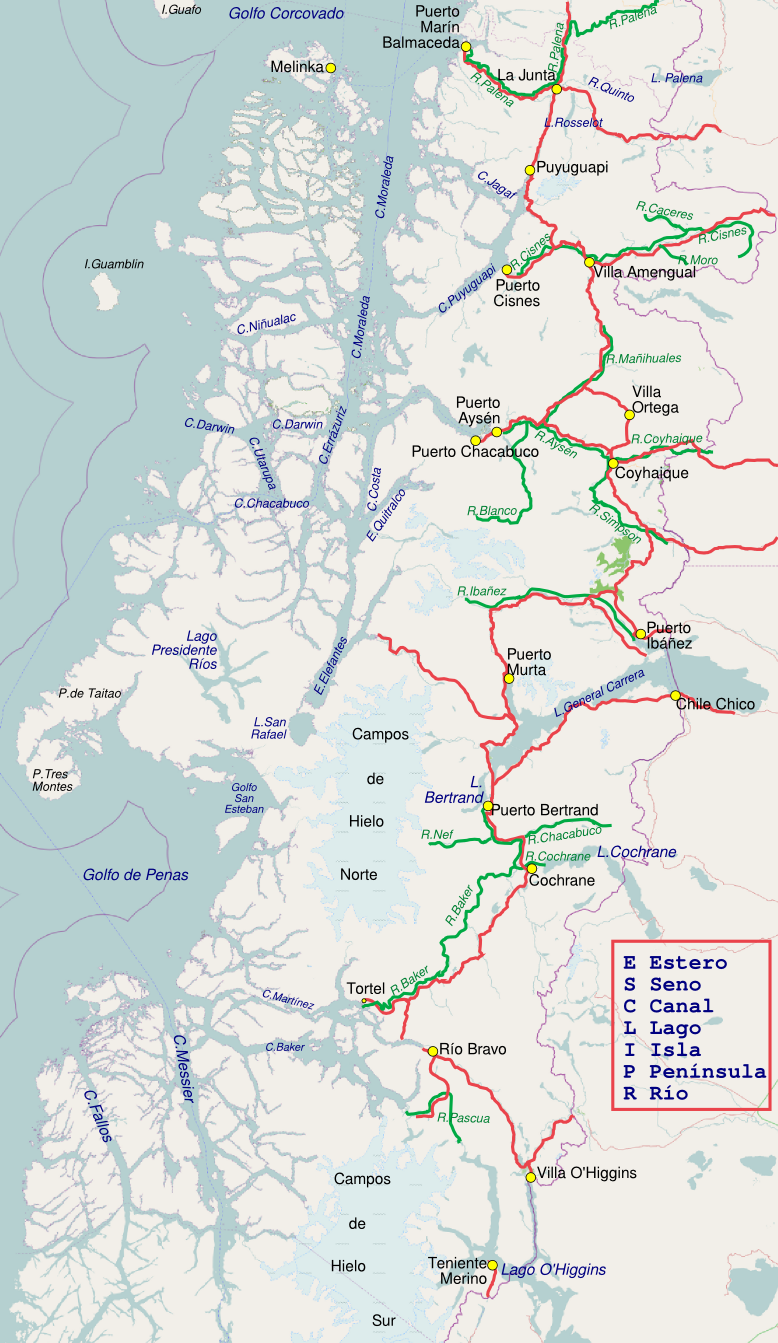
- Presidente Ríos Lake in the Aysén Region

- Location within Chile
- Interactive map of Presidente Ríos Lake
- Location: Aysén Province
- Coordinates: 46°28′S 74°25′W
- Catchment area: 27,410 km^{2} (10,580 sq mi)
- Basin countries: Chile
- Max. length: 40 km (25 mi)
- Max. width: 40 km (25 mi)
- Surface area: 352 km^{2} (136 sq mi)
- Surface elevation: 60 m (200 ft)

Presidente Ríos Lake (Spanish pronunciation: [pɾesiˈðente ˈri.os]) is located in the Aysén del General Carlos Ibáñez del Campo Region of Chile. It lies in the middle of the Taitao Peninsula.

While the lake's existence only became known in Chile in 1945, it appears to have been known by Chono natives, who led 19 survivors of HMS Wager (including Captain David Cheap and Midshipman John Byron) from Wager Island through it in 1742. The Chonos, who often had a hostile relationship with the Spanish, kept the lake secret from them despite serving the Spanish as maritime pilots. Despite official discovery in 1945, the lake was already known to seafarers from Chiloé.
