= Lieutenant (navy) =

Commissioned officer rank in many nations' navies

Lieutenant (Note: The pronunciation of lieutenant is generally split between /lɛfˈtɛnənt/ lef-TEN-ənt, /lɪf-/ lif-, generally in the United Kingdom, Ireland, and Commonwealth countries, and /luːˈtɛnənt/ loo-TEN-ənt, /lə-/, generally associated with the United States. See lieutenant.) (abbreviated Lt, LT (U.S.), LT(USN), Lieut and LEUT, depending on nation) is a commissioned officer rank in many English-speaking nations' navies and coast guards. It is typically the most senior of junior officer ranks. In most navies, the rank's insignia may consist of two medium gold braid stripes, the uppermost stripe featuring an executive curl in many Commonwealth of Nations; or three stripes of equal or unequal width.

The now immediately senior rank of lieutenant commander was formerly a senior naval lieutenant rank. Many navies also use a subordinate rank of sub-lieutenant. The appointment of "first lieutenant" in many navies is held by a senior lieutenant.

This naval lieutenant ranks higher than an army lieutenants; within NATO countries the naval rank of lieutenant is a OF-2 and is the equivalent rank of an army captain. Other nations will use a naval lieutenant rank equivalent to an army lieutenant.

== History ==
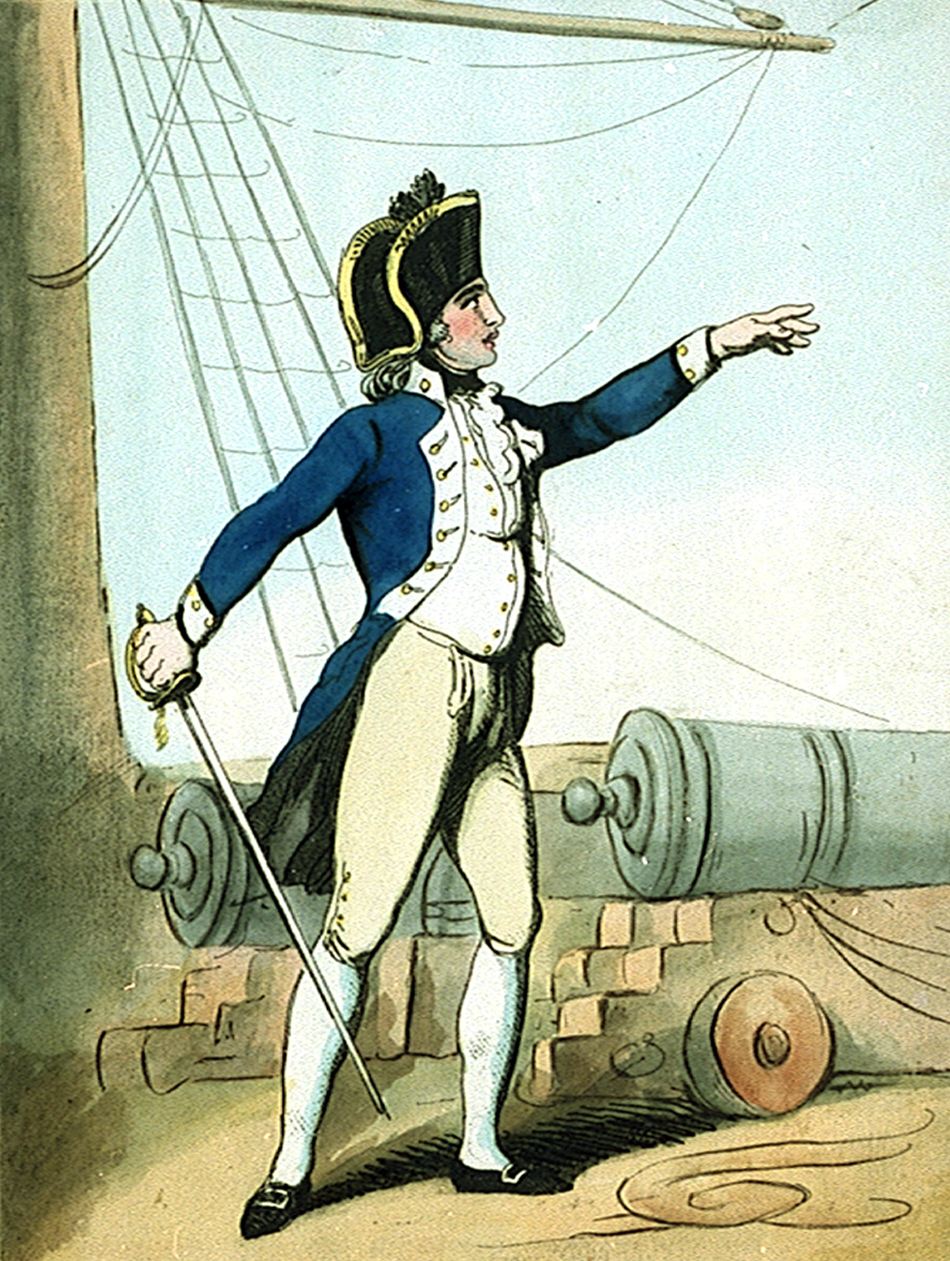
1799 illustration of a Royal Navy lieutenant

From at least 1580, the lieutenant on a ship had been the officer immediately subordinate to the captain. Before the English Restoration, lieutenants were appointed by their captains, and this inevitably led to abuses and to the widespread appointment of men of insufficient qualification. In 1677, Samuel Pepys, while he was Chief Secretary to the Admiralty, introduced the first examination for lieutenant, and thereafter their seniority was dated from the passing of this examination.

A lieutenant was numbered by his seniority within the ship on which he served, so that a frigate (which was entitled to three) would have a first, a second, and a third lieutenant. A first-rate ship was entitled to six, and they were numbered accordingly. At first, a lieutenant's commission was given only for the particular ship in which he served, but after the loss of HMS Wager in 1741 and the subsequent mutiny, the Royal Navy changed its policy and lieutenants were given more general commissions upon passing their examination.

During the early days of the naval rank, some lieutenants could be very junior indeed, while others could be on the cusp of promotion to captain; those lieutenants ranged across present-day army ranks from a second lieutenant through to a lieutenant colonel. As the rank structure of navies stabilized, and the ranks of commander, lieutenant commander, and sub-lieutenant (or lieutenant, junior grade in the U.S. services) were introduced, the rank of naval lieutenant became less wide-ranging and is today the equivalent of an army captain.

== Promotion ==
In the United States Navy, promotion to lieutenant is governed by United States Department of Defense policies derived from the Defense Officer Personnel Management Act (DOPMA) of 1980. The United States Coast Guard follows the same policy regarding promotion to lieutenant. DOPMA guidelines suggest that at least 95% of lieutenants (junior grade) should be promoted to lieutenant after serving a minimum of two years at the lower rank.

In the Royal Navy, promotion to lieutenant is done in line with seniority. Officers are typically promoted after serving as a sub-lieutenants (OF-1) for 30 months. However, promotion may be quicker if a candidate has previous naval service and commissions from the ranks (upper yardsman/senior upper yardsman).

== "First lieutenant" in naval usage ==
The first lieutenant (1st Lt or 1LT) in the Royal Navy and other Commonwealth navies, is a post or appointment, rather than a rank. Historically, the lieutenants in a ship were ranked in accordance with seniority, with the most senior being termed the first lieutenant and acting as the second-in-command. Although lieutenants are no longer numbered by seniority, the post of "first lieutenant" remains.

In minor war vessels, destroyers and frigates, the first lieutenant (either a lieutenant or lieutenant commander) is second in command, executive officer (XO) and head of the executive branch; in larger ships, where a commander of the warfare specialisation is appointed as the executive officer, a first lieutenant (normally a lieutenant commander) is appointed as his deputy. The post of first lieutenant in a shore establishment carries a similar responsibility to that of the first lieutenant of a capital ship.

In the U.S. Navy or U.S. Coast Guard, the billet of first lieutenant describes the officer in charge of the deck department or division, depending on the size of the ship. In smaller ships that have only a single deck division, the billet is typically filled by an ensign; while in larger ships, with a deck department consisting of multiple subordinate divisions, the billet may be filled by a lieutenant commander. On submarines and smaller Coast Guard cutters, the billet of first lieutenant may be filled by a petty officer.

== Rank insignia ==
The insignia of a lieutenant in many navies, including the Royal Navy, consists of two medium gold braid stripes (top stripe with loop) on a navy blue or black background. This pattern was copied by the United States Navy, the United States Coast Guard, United States Public Health Service (USPHS) Commissioned Corps the National Oceanographic and Atmospheric Administration Commissioned Officer Corps (NOAA Corps), and various air forces (primarily those of the United Kingdom, British Commonwealth, and nations formerly aligned with the Crown) for their equivalent ranks and grades, except that the executive curl is removed (see flight lieutenant).

In the United States, contingent on the type of uniform worn, U.S. Navy, U.S. Coast Guard, USPHS Commissioned Corps, and NOAA Corps lieutenants also wear pin-on metal collar, shoulder, or headgear insignia, or cloth shoulder, collar, tabbed, or headgear insignia identical to that of a United States Marine Corps captain and similar to that of a United States Army, United States Air Force, or United States Space Force captain.

== Gallery ==
Lieutenant
(Antigua and Barbuda Coast Guard)

Lieutenant
(Royal Australian Navy)

Lieutenant
(Royal Bahamas Defence Force)

Lieutenant
(Bangladesh Navy)

Lieutenant
(Barbados Coast Guard)

Lieutenant
(Belize Coast Guard)

Leftenan
(Royal Brunei Navy)

Lieutenant
(French: Lieutenant de vaisseau)
(Royal Canadian Navy)

Lieutenant
(Republic of Fiji Navy)

Lieutenant
(Gambian Navy)

Lieutenant
(Ghana Navy)

Lieutenant
(Guyana Coast Guard)

Lieutenant
(Indian Navy)

Lieutenant
(Irish Naval Service)

Lieutenant
(Jamaican Coast Guard)

Lieutenant
(Liberian National Coast Guard)

Leftenan
(Royal Malaysian Navy)

Lieutenant
(Namibian Navy)

Lieutenant
(Royal New Zealand Navy)

Lieutenant
(Nigerian Navy)

Lieutenant
(Urdu: لیفٹیننٹ, romanized: Leftinent)
(Pakistan Navy)

Lieutenant
(Papua New Guinea Maritime Element)

Lieutenant
(Philippine Navy)

Lieutenant
(Saint Kitts and Nevis Coast Guard)

Lieutenant
(Sierra Leone Navy)

Lieutenant
(South African Navy)

Lieutenant
(Sri Lanka Navy)

Lieutenant
(Tanzania Naval Command)

Lieutenant
(Tongan Navy)

Lieutenant
(Trinidad and Tobago Coast Guard)

Lieutenant
(Royal Navy)

Lieutenant
(United States Navy)

Lieutenant
(United States Coast Guard)

Lieutenant
(Bislama: Lietnen)
(Vanuatu Maritime Wing)

== See also ==
- Captain lieutenant
- Instructor lieutenant (Royal Navy)
- List of comparative military ranks
