= Río Bravo Airport =

- IATA: none; ICAO: SCRB

Summary
- Airport type: Public
- Serves: Caleta Tortel, Chile
- Location: Rio Bravo
- Elevation AMSL: 37 ft / 11 m
- Coordinates: 47°59′25″S 73°08′33″W

Map
- Location of Río Bravo Airport in Chile

Runways
Direction	Length		Surface
Direction	m	ft	Surface
10/28	710	2,329	Grass
- Sources: Landings.com Google Maps GCM

Río Bravo Airport (Spanish: Aeropuerto Río Bravo, (ICAO: SCRB)) is an airstrip 36 kilometres (22 mi) southeast of Caleta Tortel in the Aysén Region of Chile. The airstrip serves settlements along the Estero Mitchell, one of the many channels leading to the Pacific Ocean.

There is mountainous terrain in all quadrants.

== See also ==
- Transport in Chile
- List of airports in Chile
