= Caleta Tortel Airport =

Enrique Mayer Soto Airport Caleta Tortel Airport
- IATA: none; ICAO: SCCR

Summary
- Airport type: Public
- Serves: Caleta Tortel, Chile
- Elevation AMSL: 4 ft / 1 m
- Coordinates: 47°47′12″S 73°31′57″W

Map
- Location of Enrique Mayer Soto Airport in Chile

Runways
Direction	Length		Surface
Direction	m	ft	Surface
04/22	570	1,870	Grass
- Sources: Landings.com Google Maps GCM

Enrique Meyer Soto Airport (ICAO: SCCR) is an airport serving Caleta Tortel, a Pacific coastal village in the Aysén Region of Chile.

The runway is on the opposite side of a hill north of the village. There is mountainous terrain in all quadrants.

== See also ==
- Transport in Chile
- List of airports in Chile
