= David Cheap =

British Royal Navy officer

Captain David Cheap
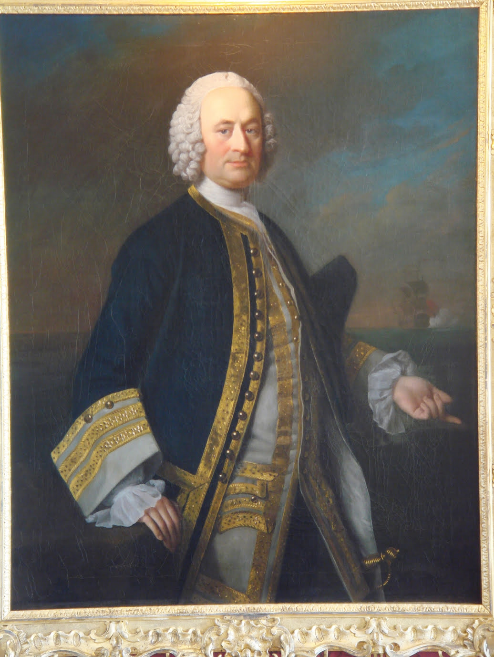
- Cheap in 1748
- Born: 1697
- Died: 21 July 1752 (aged 54–55); Scotland
- Military career
- Allegiance: Great Britain
- Branch: Royal Navy
- Rank: Captain
- Commands: HMS Tryall; HMS Wager; HMS Lark
- Conflicts: War of Jenkins' Ear; George Anson's voyage around the world

Captain David Cheap (1697 – 21 July 1752) was a Scottish Royal Navy officer. He is most known for being in command of HMS Wager when it was wrecked in May 1741 on the shores of Wager Island in Chilean Patagonia.

Spain and Great Britain were at war in 1739. Cheap, then just a lieutenant, was appointed to serve under Commodore George Anson, commander of an expedition to the Pacific Ocean. The original captain of Wager died, at sea, while the expedition was still navigating the South Atlantic. Anson gave Cheap acting command of the vessel.

Cheap's management of Wager, prior to the wreck, and his attempts to manage his former crew, after the wreck, continue to be discussed to the present day. Cheap had been an unpopular commander, and, after the ship was wrecked, most of his crew would not follow his instructions. Officer's commissions, at the time, only appointed them to command ships. Seamen's pay ended when a ship was sunk. His former crew thought his formal authority over them ended when the ship was sunk. Most of the surviving crew attempted to sail to safety in the ship's longboat, the Speedwell, under the command of the ship's former gunner, John Bulkeley. After being brought to the Chilean coast by Chono guides, Cheap and three of his former officers were captured by Spanish authorities and arrived back in Britain years after Bulkeley, and after Bulkeley had published an account of the voyage that showed Cheap in a poor light.
