= Tortel =

- Commune
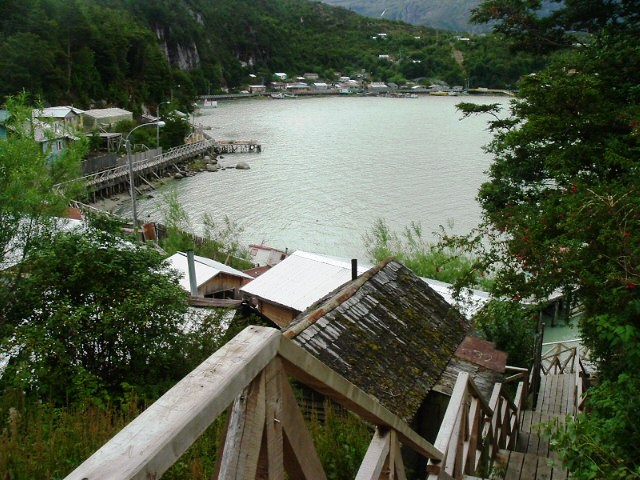
- Wooden walkways in Caleta Tortel

- Location of the Tortel commune in the Aysén Region Location within Chile
- Coordinates: 47°47′49″S 73°31′59″W
- Country: Chile
- Region: Aysén
- Province: Capitán Prat
- Seat: Caleta Tortel

Government
  - Type: Municipality
  - Alcalde: Marisela Jimenez (Independent)

Area
  - Total: 19,930.6 km^{2} (7,695.2 sq mi)
- Elevation: 7 m (23 ft)

Population (2012 Census)
  - Total: 487
  - Density: 0.0244/km^{2} (0.0633/sq mi)
  - Urban: 0
  - Rural: 507

Sex
  - Men: 322
  - Women: 185
- Time zone: UTC−04:00 (CLT)
  - Summer (DST): UTC−03:00 (CLST)
- Area code: 56 + 67
- Website: www.tortel.cl

Tortel is a Chilean commune located at the outflow of the Baker River and Pascua River to the Pacific Ocean. It lies between the Northern and Southern Patagonian Ice Field in the Capitán Prat Province in the Aysén Region. The commune is administered by the municipality in Caleta Tortel, the principal settlement.

== Demographics ==
Historical population
Year	Pop.	±% p.a.
1970	227	—
1982	292	+2.12%
1992	448	+4.37%
2002	507	+1.24%
2017	523	+0.21%
2024	505	−0.50%
Source: "Censo de Población y Vivienda". National Statistics Institute.

According to the 2002 census of the Chilean National Statistics Institute, Tortel spans an area of 19,930.6 km^{2} (7,695 sq mi) and has 507 inhabitants (322 men and 185 women), making the commune an entirely rural area. The population grew by 13% (59 persons) between the 1992 and 2002 censuses.

== Administration ==
As a commune, Tortel is a third-level administrative division of Chile administered by a municipal council, headed by an alcalde who is directly elected every four years. The 2008–2012 alcalde is Bernardo López Sierra (PPD).

Within the electoral divisions of Chile, Tortel is represented in the Chamber of Deputies by Iván Fuentes Castillo (Nueva Mayoría) and David Sandoval (UDI) as part of the 59th electoral district, which includes the entire Aisén Region. The commune is represented in the Senate by Antonio Horvath Kiss (RN) and Patricio Walker Prieto (PDC) as part of the 18th senatorial constituency (Aisén Region).

== Landmarks and main features ==
Tortel commune is one of the most remote in southern Chile and its unspoiled landscape is one of its principal attractions. Features include:

- Caleta Tortel is a lumber town with an intricate walkway system built by the town's inhabitants which run several kilometres around the cove (“caleta”). Without these walkways, the only way to communicate and travel between houses would be by boat, given the density of the vegetation and the steepness of the hills around the cove. The walkway system has become part of the town's culture and a local tourist attraction.
- Laguna San Rafael National Park is a park located on the Pacific coast of southern Chile. The park is named for the San Rafael Lagoon formed by the retreat of the San Rafael Glacier. Created in 1959, it covers an area of 17,420 km^{2} (6,726 sq mi) and includes the Northern Patagonian Ice Field. A fjord of more than 16 km (10 mi) in length is one of the park's principal attractions.
- The Southern Patagonian Ice Field (Spanish: Hielos Continentales or Campo de Hielo Sur), located in the Southern Patagonian Andes between Argentina and Chile, is the world's second largest contiguous extrapolar ice field. It is the bigger of two remnant parts of the Patagonian Ice Sheet, which covered all of southern Chile during the last glacial period, locally called the Llanquihue glaciation.
- Katalalixar National Reserve is a natural reserve located in an archipelago between the Southern Patagonian Ice Field and the Northern Patagonian Ice Field in the Aysén Region of Chile. The reserve was created in 1983 and has no infrastructure. It covers an area of 6,245 km^{2} (2,411 sq mi) within the Magellanic subpolar forests ecoregion and exhibits more biodiversity than other areas of southern Chile. This may appear contradictory, as the area is supposed to have been covered by the Patagonian Ice Sheet during the last glacial maximum.
- Bernardo O'Higgins National Park (Spanish pronunciation: [beɾˈnaɾðo oˈxiɣins]) is the largest of the protected areas in Chile, covering an area of 35,259 km^{2} (13,614 sq mi) in both the Aysén and Magallanes and Antártica Chilena regions. Management of this and other national parks in Chile is entrusted to the Corporación Nacional Forestal (CONAF). The park is named after General Bernardo O'Higgins, the first head of state of the Republic of Chile. Los Glaciares National Park (Argentina) and Torres del Paine National Park (Chile) are its neighbours to the east, Laguna San Rafael National Park is located to the north, the Alacalufes National Reserve to the southwest and the Katalalixar National Reserve to the northwest.
