= Caleta Tortel =

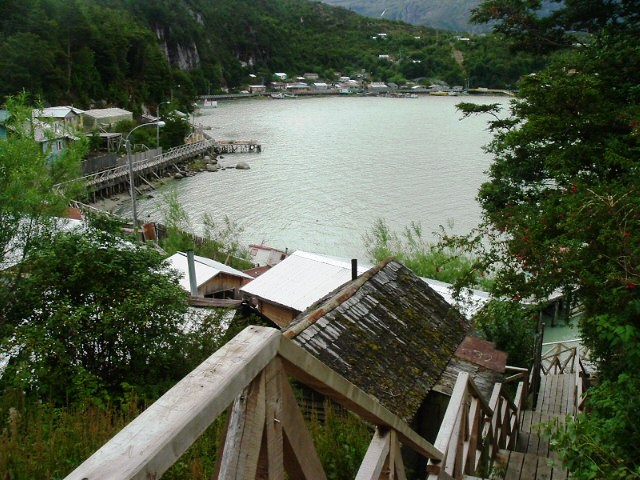
- View of Caleta Tortel with its wooden walkways

- Location within Chile
- Coordinates: 47°47′S 73°32′W
- Country: Chile
- Region: Aisén
- Province: Capitán Prat
- Municipalidad: Tortel
- Comuna: Tortel
- Established: 1955

Government
  - Type: Municipalidad
  - Alcalde: Gabriel López M.

Population (2017 census )
  - Total: 523
- Time zone: UTC−04:00 (Chilean Standard)
  - Summer (DST): UTC−03:00 (Chilean Daylight)
- Area code: Country + town = 56 + ?
- Climate: Cfb
- Website: http://www.municipalidaddetortel.cl/

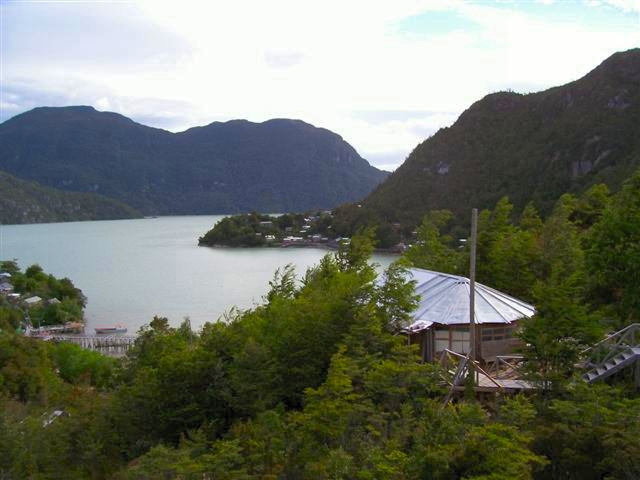
Caleta Tortel

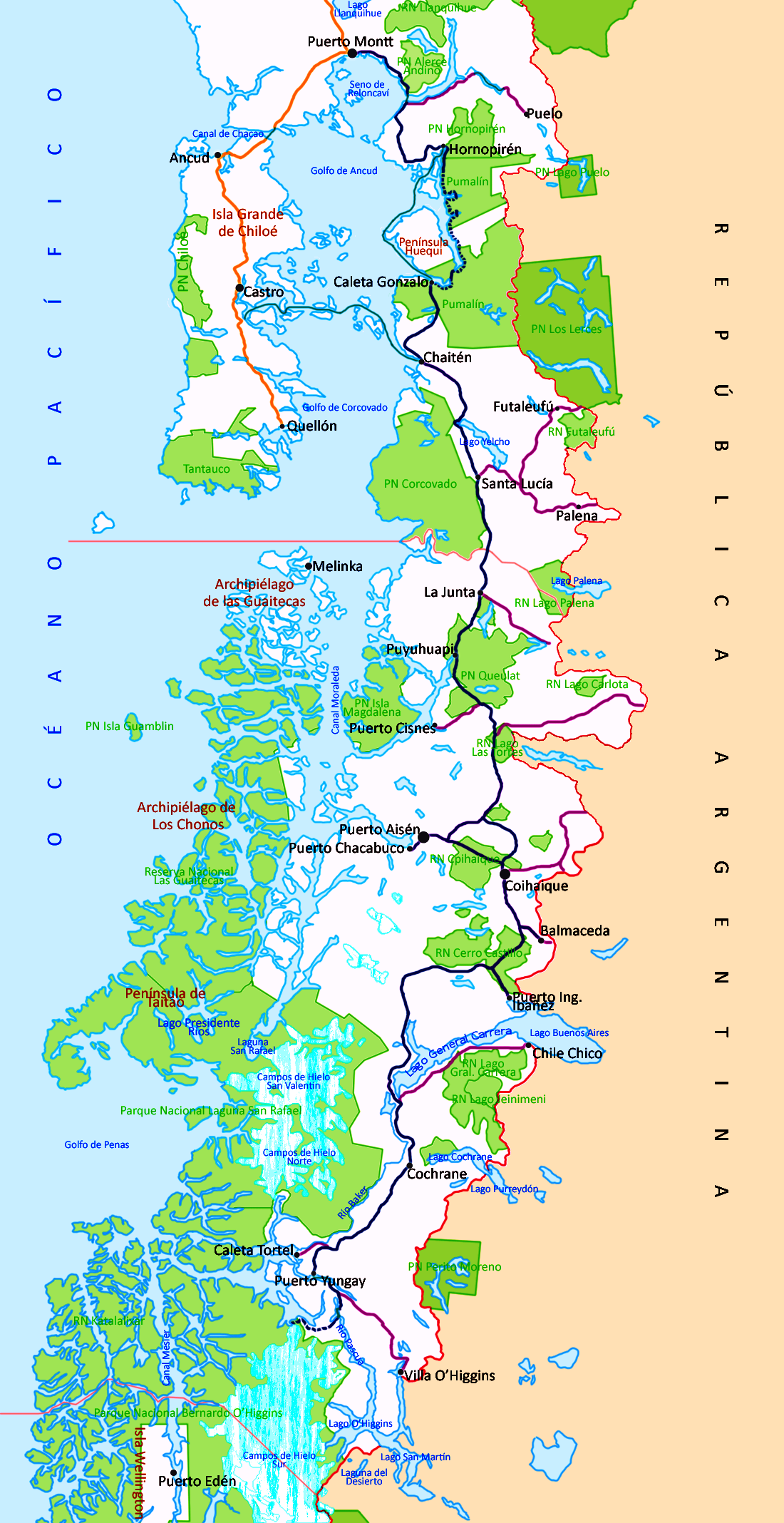
Map of Caleta Tortel and surrounding region

Caleta Tortel is a coastal village (Spanish: aldea) in Chile. It is the administrative center of the commune of Tortel and is located between the mouth of the Baker River the largest river in Chile and a small embayment of the Baker Channel. The surrounding geography is rugged, formed by a number of islands, fjords, channels and estuaries. The village was founded in 1955 to exploit the Guaytecas cypress (Pilgerodendron uviferum) wood that was abundant in the area. The timber business accounts for most of the economy in Tortel to this day.

Caleta Tortel consists mainly of stilt houses, typical of Chilotan architecture, built along the coast for several kilometers. There are no conventional streets - instead there are wooden walkways built with Guaitecas cypress. The wooden walkways give the village its distinctive look and its unique culture.

There is one school in Caleta Tortel, called Escuela Comandante Luis Bravo Bravo, inaugurated by the Chilean Navy in 1978 it runs up to 8th grade and has about 90 students total. There are no banks or cash points except for BancoEstado clients, but there is Entel cellphone coverage, line phones and access to the internet including free WiFi at the public library. There is a rural health centre, police checkpoint, fire-fighters, harbour master, municipality and civil registration.

== Transportation ==
For most of its history, the village had only air and boat access. Constructed in 2003, the X-904 road connects Caleta Tortel with the Carretera Austral. Boat tours to Jorge Montt Glacier and other places are available from the village. There is also scheduled boat service between Caleta Tortel and Villa Puerto Edén. The village is served by Caleta Tortel Airport (IATA: SCCR). Río Bravo Airport (IATA: SCRB), 37 kilometres (23 mi) southeast of Caleta Tortel, is another nearby airstrip.

== See also ==
- Tortel
- Northern Patagonian Ice Field
- Southern Patagonian Ice Field
- Guayaneco Archipelago
