= Stanley Walter Croucher Pack =

British author and Royal Navy officer

Stanley Walter Croucher Pack CBE (1904–1977) was an officer in the Royal Navy, and an author of several books related to maritime topics.

In 1928, while an instructor Commander at Dartmouth Naval College, he wrote a meteorology textbook entitled The Frequency Departure of Thermionic Oscillators from the L. C. Valve. Decades later he wrote a book about the college, entitled Britannia at Dartmouth.

In 1953 the London Gazette reported he had been promoted from Instructor Commander to Instructor Captain.

Pack was one of the UK representatives when the World Meteorological Organization's subcommittees, the Commission for Instruments and Methods of Observation, when it met in Toronto, in August 1953.

In 1957 he was made a Commander of the Order of the British Empire.

== Bibliography ==
- S. W. C. Pack (1928). The Frequency Departure of Thermionic Oscillators from the L. C. Valve. University of London Press.
- S. W. C. Pack (1960). Admiral Lord Anson: the story of Anson's voyage and naval events of his day. Cassell. p. →.
- S. W. C. Pack (1961). The Battle of Matapan. The Macmillan Company. p. →.
- S. W. C. Pack (1964). The Wager Mutiny. A. Redman.
- S. W. C. Pack (1964). Windward of the Caribbean: A Look at Barbados. A. Redman.
- S. W. C. Pack (1967). "Britannia at Dartmouth". A. Redman.
- S. W. C. Pack (1971). Sea Power in the Mediterranean: A Study of the Struggle for Sea Power in the Mediterranean from the Seventeenth Century to the. Arthur Barker Limited. ISBN 9780213003944.
- S. W. C. Pack (1972). Night action off Cape Matapan. Allan Press. ISBN 9780711002579.
- S. W. C. Pack (1973). "The battle for Crete". Naval Institute Press. ISBN 9780870218101.
- S. W. C. Pack (1974). Cunningham the Commander. B T Batsford. ISBN 9780713427882.
- S. W. C. Pack (1975). The Battle of Sirte. Allan Press. ISBN 9780711005969.
- S. W. C. Pack (1977). "Operation HUSKY: the Allied invasion of Sicily". Hippocrene Books. ISBN 9780882544403.
- S. W. C. Pack (1978). Invasion North Africa, 1942. Scribner. ISBN 9780684159218.
