= John Bulkeley (Royal Navy gunner) =

British seaman

John Bulkeley was a British seaman, best known for leading survivors of the wreck of HMS Wager to safety. Bulkeley was the ship's gunner, not one of her commissioned officers. David Cheap, the ship's acting captain, had lost the confidence of his former crew, many of whom were convinced that when the ship was sunk, and their pay ended, they were no longer bound by the Royal Navy's discipline or chain of command.

140 of the ship's complement of 160 survived the wreck, but with very few salvaged supplies, in a very isolated region of southern Chile. By the time the ship's longboat, its largest boat, had been lengthened, over forty additional men had died of starvation, disease, or internal strife. Captain Cheap had shot one man himself.

When Bulkeley and most of the remaining survivors set out for Portuguese-controlled Brazil, in the longboat and two other surviving boats, they only had two weeks of food.

The longboat did make it to Brazil, but with just thirty survivors. Bulkeley was able to arrange for the passage of the survivors back to Europe, and when they arrived in Britain, he and the ship's carpenter, John Cummins, published an account of their voyage that sold widely.

Unexpectedly, Captain Cheap, and three of his officers, including a young John Byron, also survived, and returned home after Bulkeley, after their Spanish captors exchanged them for Spanish captives. George Anson, the commodore of the expedition of which Wager had been a part, would later pass legislation that clarified that ship's officers did retain authority over their crew, even if their ships were lost. Bulkeley was never charged with mutiny and, following Cheap's acquittal after losing his ship, emigrated to the Colony of Pennsylvania, where his book was republished in 1757. Bulkeley thereafter vanished from the historical record, and his final fate is unknown.

== Publication ==
Bulkeley, with John Cummins, wrote an account of this experiences entitled A voyage to the South-Seas, in the years 1740-1 (1743), which was published with the long subtitle, "A faithful Narrative of the Loss of his Majesty's Ship the WAGER on a desolate Island in the Latitude 47 South, Longitude 81:40 West: With the Proceedings and Conduct of the Officers and Crew, and the Hardships they endured in the said Island for the Space of five Months; their bold attempt for Liberty; in Coasting the Southern Part of the vast region of Patagonia; setting out with upward of Eighty Souls in their boats; the Loss of the Cutter; their Passage through the Straits of Magellan; an Account of the incredible Hardships they frequently underwent for Want of Food of any Kind."
