= HMS Wager (1739) =

1734 East Indiaman, later sixth-rate frigate

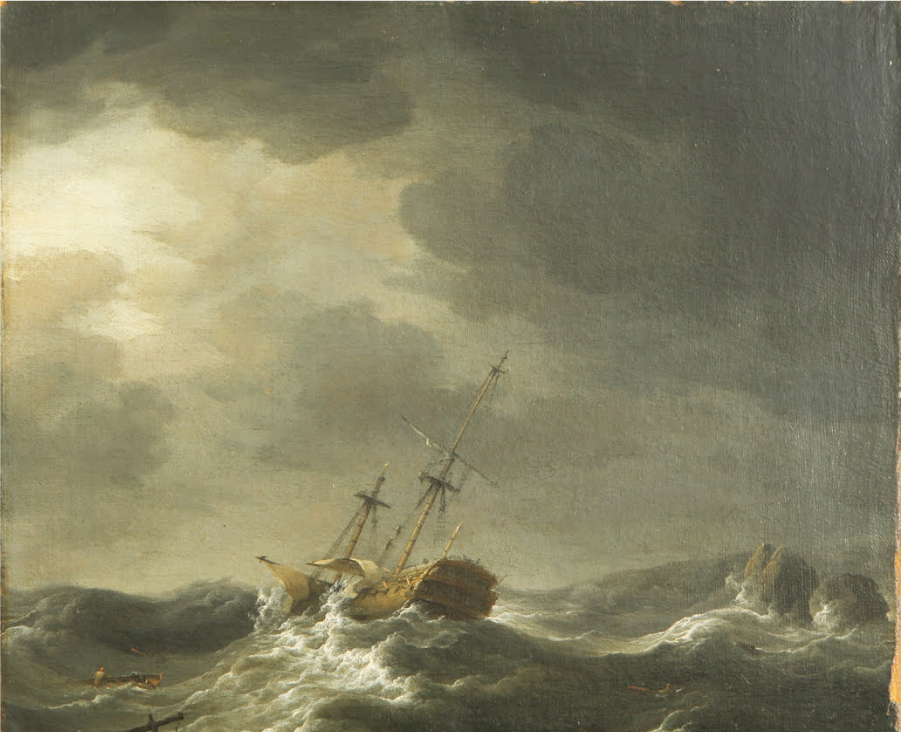
- Charles Brooking's 1744 painting of HMS Wager in extremis, based on the Bulkeley's published journal

History

Great Britain
- Name: Wager
- Owner: Hugh Raymond
- Operator: East India Company
- Builder: Buxton, Rotherhithe
- Launched: 12 March 1734
- Fate: Sold to the Royal Navy in 1739

Great Britain
- Name: HMS Wager
- Cost: £3,912 2s 1½d
- Acquired: Purchased on 21 November 1739
- Commissioned: December 1739
- Fate: Wrecked off Chile on 14 May 1741

General characteristics
- Class & type: Sixth rate
- Tons burthen: 551, or 55882/94 (bm)
- Length: 123 ft (37.5 m) (gundeck); 101 ft 4 1/8 in (30.9 m)
- Beam: 32 ft 2 3/8 in (9.8 m)
- Depth of hold: 14 ft 4 in (4.4 m)
- Sail plan: Ship rig
- Complement: East India Company: 98 men; Royal Navy: 160 men
- Armament: 28 guns

HMS Wager was a square-rigged sixth-rate Royal Navy ship of 28 guns. It was built as an East Indiaman in about 1734 and made two voyages to India for the East India Company before the Royal Navy purchased her in 1739. It formed part of a squadron under Commodore George Anson and was wrecked in Aysén Region of Chile on 14 May 1741. The wreck of Wager became famous for the subsequent adventures of the survivors who found themselves marooned on the desolate Wager Island in the middle of a Patagonian winter, and in particular because of the Wager Mutiny that followed.

== Service in the East India Company ==
Wager was an East Indiaman, an armed trading vessel built mainly to accommodate large cargoes of goods from the Far East. As an Indiaman, it carried 30 guns and had a crew of 98.

Under Captain Charles Raymond, it sailed from the Downs on 13 February 1735, arriving in Madras on 18 July and returning to England via St Helena in July 1736. It made a second and final run for the Company to India in 1738, sailing via the Cape of Good Hope to Madras and Bengal, and returning to the Downs on 27 August 1739.

== Purchase by the Royal Navy ==
The Admiralty purchased Wager from Mr J. Raymond on 21 November 1739, and rated her as a 28-gun sixth rate. The vessel was then converted to serve as part of a squadron commanded by George Anson that would attack Spanish interests on the Pacific west coast of South America; its primary role would be to carry weapons and munitions for shore raiding parties, and to provide artillery support when necessary. As part of naval registration, the vessel was renamed for the expedition's primary sponsor, Admiral Sir Charles Wager, First Lord of the Admiralty.

She was fitted for naval service at Deptford Dockyard between 23 November 1739 and 23 May 1740 at a cost of £7,096.2.4d, and was registered as a sixth rate on 22 April 1740, being established with 120 men and 28 guns.

== Anson's circumnavigation ==
Anson's expedition to the Pacific in August 1740 comprised six warships and two transports, manned by a total of 1,854 men. Given that Wager was not intended for direct military action, most of her crew in particular were aged or disabled seamen supplied by the Admiralty as a cost-saving measure.

The Navy initially commissioned Wager under an experienced captain, Dandy Kidd, who died of illness before the ship reached Cape Horn; his replacement was Lieutenant David Cheap, a seasoned sailor and commander who had never commanded a ship bigger than a sloop. The squadron rounded Cape Horn in terrible weather; unable to keep pace, Wager lost contact with Anson. Eager not to waste precious time searching, the commodore declared her lost and continued on. Unaware of this, Cheap set a new course in hopes of intercepting Anson.

== Wreck of Wager ==
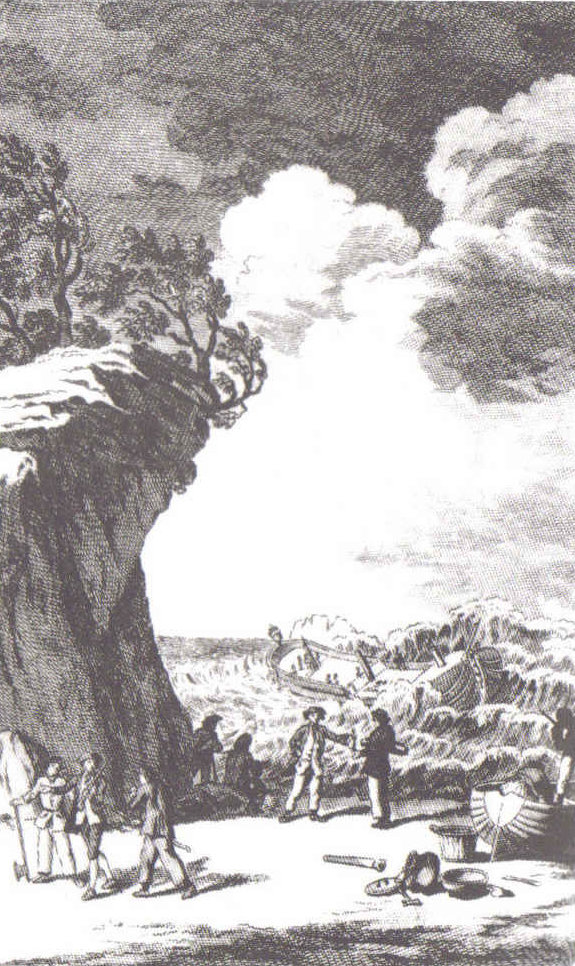
"The Wreck of the Wager", the frontispiece from John Byron's account

Cheap steered the Wager close to the coast of modern-day Chile. On 13 May 1741 at 9:00am, the carpenter went forward to inspect the chain plates. Whilst there he thought he caught a fleeting glimpse of land to the west. Lieutenant Baynes was also there but he saw nothing, and the sighting was not reported. Consequently, no one realised that Wager had entered a large, uncharted bay, the Gulf of Penas.

At 2:00pm land was positively sighted to the west and northwest and all hands were mustered to make sail and turn the ship to the southwest. During the operations that followed, Captain Cheap fell down the quarterdeck ladder, dislocated his shoulder, and was confined below. Already damaged badly by the storm, the Wager struggled to get free of the bay while Cheap's officers tried to maintain order.

At 4:30am the next day the ship struck rocks repeatedly, broke her tiller, and although still afloat, was partially flooded. Invalids below who were too sick to get out of their hammocks drowned. The ship was steered with sail alone towards land, but later in the morning she struck again, and this time became trapped hard aground.

Wager had struck the coast of what would subsequently be known as Wager Island in position 47°40′43″S 75°02′57″W in Guayaneco Archipelago. A nearby island just to the west is named Byron Island (es:Isla Byron), in honour of loyal midshipman John Byron.

Order collapsed once it became clear that the ship was doomed; a large party of men raided the liquor supply and officers' quarters, drinking and looting freely whilst fighting among themselves. The other survivors took to the boats and made it safely on shore. On the following day, Friday 15 May, the ship bilged amidships, water flooded in below, and many of the drunken crew still on board drowned; the few remaining were hastily rescued.

== The Wager mutiny ==
In the Royal Navy of 1741, officers' commissions were valid only for the ship to which they had been appointed; thus the loss of the ship implied the loss of any official authority. Seamen ceased to be paid on the loss of their ship. After the wreck of Wager, these factors, combined with terrible conditions and murderous in-fighting between officers and men, caused discipline to break down. The party divided into two: 81 men under the gunner, John Bulkeley, took to small boats with the aim of returning to England via the East coast of South America, and 20 men, including Captain Cheap and Midshipman John Byron (later Vice Admiral "Foulweather Jack") remained on Wager Island. After a series of disasters, over five years later, some of Bulkeley's group and four of Captain Cheap's group returned to England. Wager had left England with 120 men on board.

== Spanish response and fate of the wreck site ==
The British arrival caused great alarm among the Spanish who extensively searched the Patagonian archipelagoes to cleanse them of any possible British presence. In the 1740s the viceroy of Peru and the governor of Chile converged in a project to advance the frontiers of the Spanish Empire in the Southeast Pacific and prevent the establishment of a British base. As a result of this plan the Juan Fernández Islands were settled and the fort of Tenquehuen established in Chonos Archipelago near Taitao Peninsula. This last fort was manned for a year and a half before being abandoned. After the Tenquehuen fort was dismantled the Marquis of the Ensenada, being briefed on local affairs, recommended the establishment of a fort in the Guaitecas Archipelago, but this never happened. For Governor Antonio Narciso de Santa María, Chiloé Island was the most important part of the Patagonian Archipelago recommending to concentrate on the defense of Chiloé. It was following Narciso de Santa María's recommendations that the Spanish founded the "city-fort" of Ancud in 1767–1768.

Spanish charts of the mid-eighteenth century show the approximate location of the wreck, indicating that it was well known to the local elite at the time. In late 2006, a Scientific Exploration Society (SES) expedition searched for the wreck of the Wager and found at the north west corner of Wager Island, in shallow water, a 5 × 5 m piece of a wooden hull with some of the frames and external planking. It lay on the bottom of a small river, which had temporarily become a torrent after a three-day storm, which had the effect of removing a covering layer of sand. Carbon-14 dating indicated a date contemporary with the Wager. The expedition also identified "Mount Misery", named by the survivors in the contemporary accounts and used as a viewpoint, as being the 180 m high hill about 3 km south and inland from the remains. Thus Mount Misery was not either of the two more distant higher points on modern maps named Mount Wager and Mount Anson.

There is a 28 page summary of the SES 2006 expedition by the leader Major Chris Holt in C H Layman's 2015 book. This includes extensive maps and colour photographs of the locations and objects. It explains and illustrates that Wager Island has been pushed upwards out of the sea by about 7 m due to a total of 94 earthquakes since 1741. One of these actually happened during the disaster itself as is recorded in John Bulkeley's journal. The island is close to the boundary of active tectonic plates on the edge of the Pacific Ocean. The largest earthquake ever recorded occurred in the region in 1960. This major seismic activity has significantly changed the shape of Wager Island since the disaster in 1741. It is now bigger and higher. What is now an inland lake at the north west corner of the island was once an inlet connected to the sea, as shown on Admiralty charts of the early 1800s. Somewhere in this inlet, now an inland lake, was the likely location of the survivors camp in 1741, rather than on the current coastline.

"The spot which we occupied was a bay formed by hilly promontories; that to the south so exceeding steep, that in order to ascend it (for there was no going round, the bottom being washed by the sea) we were at labour of cutting steps. This, which we called Mount Misery, was of use to us in taking some observations afterwards, when the weather would permit."

The piece of discovered wooden hull had evidence of burn marks. This would be consistent with descriptions of the Spanish sponsored salvors in the late 1700s hacking pieces off the wreck, dragging them to the nearest beach, and then burning them to release the valuable metal from the structure. If so then the site of a larger section of the wreck, where HMS Wager actually came to grief, may still remain to be discovered nearby offshore. The SES 2006 expedition made a 68 minute film (by Lynwen Griffiths) which is available on YouTube called "The Quest for HMS Wager V1A".

In 2007 the Transpatagonia Expedition visited the wreck site and saw more remains.

== HMS Wager in fiction ==
The novel The Unknown Shore (pub. 1959) by Patrick O'Brian is based on the accounts of the survivors. One of the crew on Wager was Midshipman John Byron, later Vice-Admiral in the Royal Navy and grandfather of the famous poet Lord Byron. O'Brian's novel closely follows John Byron's account.

== See also ==
- List of incidents of cannibalism
