= Antonio de Vea expedition =

Spanish expedition to Patagonia, 1675–1676

The locations visited by the expedition. Antonio de Vea's party reached a point slightly south of San Javier Island while the party of Pascual de Iriarte reached Evangelistas Islets at the strait of Magellan.

The Antonio de Vea expedition of 1675–1676 was a Spanish naval expedition to the fjords and channels of Patagonia aimed to find whether rival colonial powers—specifically, the English—were active in the region. While this was not the first Spanish expedition to the region, it was the largest up to then, involving 256 men, one ocean-going ship, two long boats and nine dalcas (Spanish: Piragua). The expedition dispelled suspicion about English bases in Patagonia. Spanish authorities' knowledge of western Patagonia was greatly improved by the expedition, yet Spanish interest in the area waned thereafter until the 1740s.

== Background ==
The expedition was rooted in the explorations of John Narborough of the coasts of southern Patagonia. News of these explorations reached the Spanish from various sources. First, the Count of Molina de Herrera, Antonio de Tovar y Paz, learned about it while active as ambassador at the Court of St James's. Then was the prisoners of the expedition obtained by the Spanish during Narborough's stay in Corral Bay in late December 1670. The Spanish in Chiloé likely also heard of the expedition by orally transmitted rumours of the indigenous peoples of Patagonia.

The governor of Chiloé sent in early 1674 an expedition led by Jerónimo Díaz de Mendoza south to find out about the rumours. Jerónimo Díaz de Mendoza returned from the expedition with a native Chono who came to be known as Cristóbal Talcapillán. While settled in Chacao, Chiloé, Cristóbal Talcapillán soon learned the basics of the local Veliche language (Note: During the 17th and 18th centuries most of Chiloé Archipelago's population was bilingual. According to John Byron who spent various months in Chiloé in 1742 many Spaniards preferred to use the local Veliche language because they considered it more beautiful. Around the same time, Governor Narciso de Santa María complained that Spanish settlers in the islands could not speak Spanish properly, but could speak Veliche, and that this second language was more used.) and begun to gain notoriety for his claims about the a presence of Europeans in the far south. Talcapillán's detailed account of English settlements in two Patagonian islands caused great concern among Spanish authorities. In further inquiries, Spanish authorities asked Talcapillán to draft a map of the archipelagoes which when fact-checked with Spanish sailors astonished authorities lending credibility to Talcapillán's claims.

In Talcapillán's account, the English, which he conflated with "Moors", (Note: Indigenous Veliche (Huilliche) of Chiloé had Spanish-influenced concept of Moors, English and Dutch, these being lumped together as Spain's enemies, the Spanish had themselves a view of southern tribes very much influenced by the Veliche that lived side-by-side with the Spanish in Chiloé.) had two settlements one in a place of the mainland called Callanac and one in an island called Allauta. In Callanac the English were building a fortress with the aid of indigenous peoples according to him. Talcapillán told that an Indian called León who had been back and forth to England, and that there was a Spanish shipwreck in Lluctui, an island also controlled by the English.

== Expedition ==
=== Preparations in Peru and journey to Chiloé ===
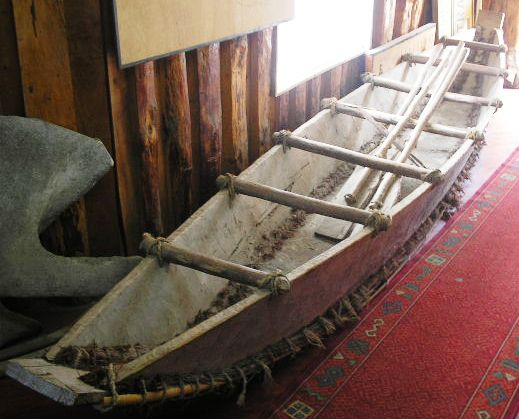
Reconstruction of a dalca in the museum of Dalcahue.

Antonio de Vea was on leave in Portobelo, Panama, when he was ordered to lead and organise the expedition. The expedition was assembled in the port of El Callao, Peru, and sat sail for Chiloé on September 21. De Vea sat sail in the ship Nuestra Señora del Rosario y Ánimas del Purgatorio with the material for two additional "long boats" to be assembled in Chiloé. In Chiloé the expedition was to be divided in two groups; one led by Antonio de Vea was to sail south from Chiloé "following the coast" and another led by Pascual de Iriate would go in the ship through the open ocean directly from Chiloé to the western entrance to the Straits of Magellan where both groups would meet.

On October 13 the expedition sighted the uninhabited Alejandro Selkirk Island without making any landing. De Vea reports that a black sailor died on October 29. Lacuy Peninsula on the northwestern corner of Chiloé Island and the nearby mainland were sighted on October 30. The expedition used the inward tidal current to enter Chacao Channel when unexpectedly Nuestra Señora del Rosario y Ánimas del Purgatorio struck on Roca Remolinos, which seriously damaged her. Two Spanish dalcas approached the ship rescuing the infantrymen while Antonio de Vea and the remaining crew managed to beach the ship in the late evening.

=== Guaitecas and San Rafael Lake ===
Map of the Isthmus of Ofqui crossed by the expedition. In red a 20th century canal project.

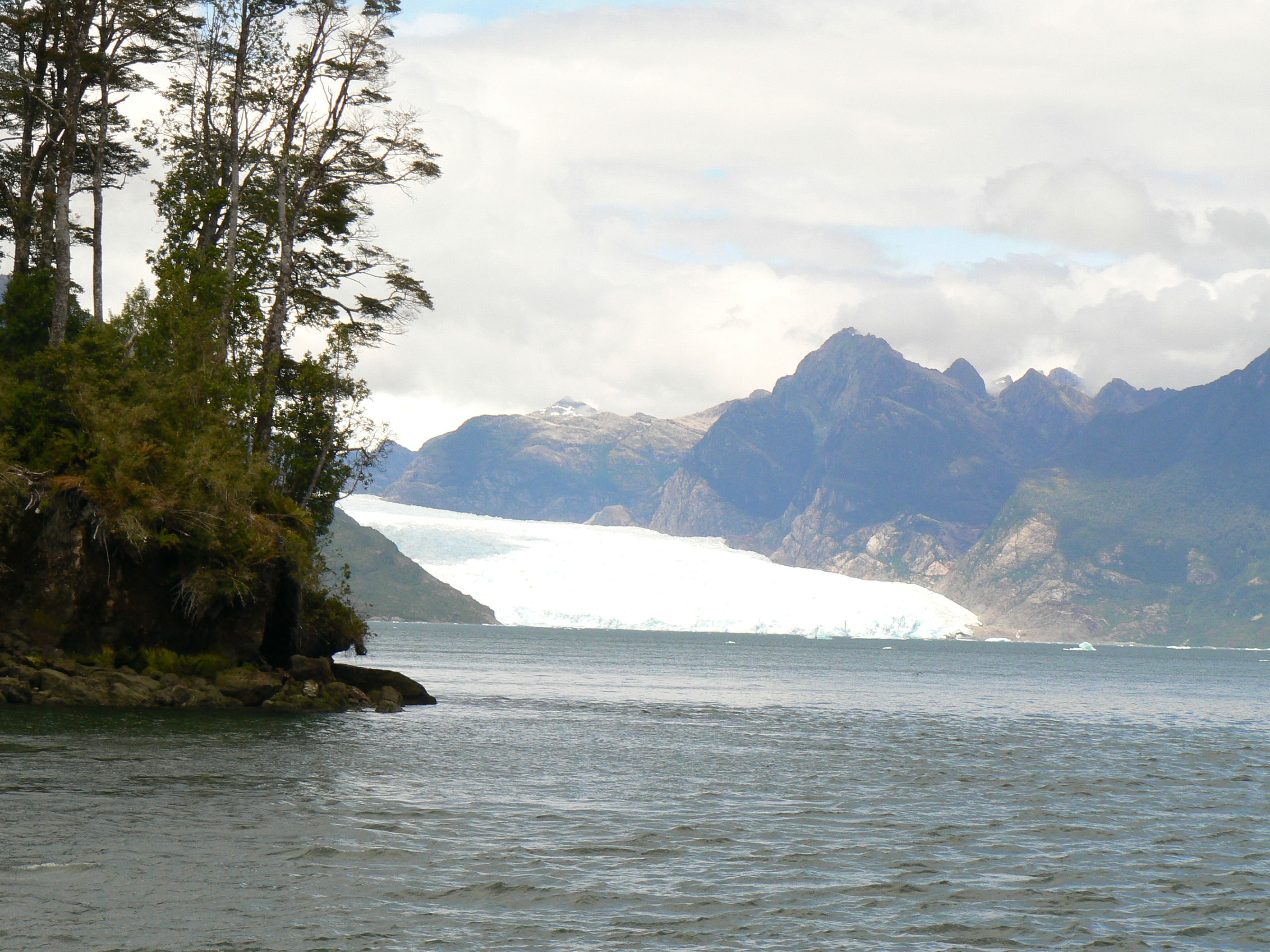
San Rafael Lake and San Rafael Glacier as seen in 2009.

On November 28 the expedition departed from the shipyard of Chiloé. (Note: The precise location of the "shipyard of Chiloé" is not known.) By then nine dalcas had been added to the two "long boats" brought from El Callao by the expedition. The party of Antonio de Vea was guided by Bartolomé Gallardo, a criollo soldier who explored the area the previous summer, the Jesuit Antonio de Amparán and Cristóbal Talcapillán. De Vea's group was made up of 70 Spaniards, including 16 sailors, and 60 Indians. The Spaniards were all from Chile and Peru.

While sailing south the expedition encountered forests of Pilgerodendron which to de Vea recalled the "cypresses of Spain". Also during the journey south, the expedition recounted to have fished "over 200 basses" with fishing nets.

The expedition entered San Rafael Lake on December 11, taking note of its windy conditions, the San Rafael Glacier and the swampy shores in the south that make up the Isthmus of Ofqui. Antonio de Vea entered San Rafael Lake through Río Témpanos (Spanish for "Ice Floe River") without mentioning any ice floes, but stating that the San Rafael Glacier did not reach far into the lake. This has been interpreted by modern researchers to reflect that the effects of the Little Ice Age were not yet in evidence there during the late 17th century.

=== Beyond the Isthmus of Ofqui ===
At the southern shores of San Rafael Lake the expedition was divided in two groups, one that was to stay behind waiting and one that was to advance further south crossing the isthmus of Ofqui by land. This last group was made up by 40 Spaniards and 40 Indians led Antonio de Vea in person and included both Talcapillán and Bartolomé Gallardo. Antonio de Vea's group used four dalcas that were disassembled and carried overland through part of the isthmus and then re-assembled. The swampy terrain meant this was a major effort despite the distances being short. Having arrived to the mouth of San Tadeo River in the sea on December 23 the group fished basses again, obtaining more than 100. Rain prevented further advances on December 24 but one day later the expedition was able to reach San Javier Island (called San Esteban Island by Antonio de Vea).

On December 25 and 26 the expedition ambushed and captured various indigenous Chono, including children and an old woman, in San Javier Island. The woman, who was judged by de Vea to be about 70 years old, reportedly told the Spanish about conflicts with an indigenous group known as Caucagues, who had iron obtained from anchors of European ships. Interrogation was made using Talcapillán (presumably from Chono to Veliche) and the alférez Lázaro Gomez as interpreters. Presumably Talcapillán translated from Chono to Veliche and then Gomez from Veliche to Spanish. According to this interrogation, the woman explained that the Caucagues were warned of the Spanish expedition by an Indian who escaped from Calbuco in Chiloé and were thus hiding. On further questioning about the presumed wreckage from where the anchor was obtained the woman declared that the wreckage occurred when she was very young. Being guided by the woman on January 2, 1676, the expedition encountered a whale carcass and next to it an empty Caucague encampment and many dogs. The Caucagues of the encampment were presumed to have fled inland.

Eventually Antonio de Vea concluded that Talcapillán was an unreliable interpreter as the old woman explained she had never said anything about iron anchors. Talcapillán retracted the story about the anchors and said he had been coerced to lie by Bartolomé Gallardo and his father Francisco Gallardo.

Before returning north, the expedition left a bronze plaque in San Javier Island indicating the King of Spain's ownership of the area.

On the way back north Guaiteca Island was reached on January 22 and the expedition returned to the shipyard of Chiloé four days later. Antonio de Vea reported to have reached as far south as 49°19' S, which may however be an exaggeration or overestimation.

=== Pascual de Iriarte's party ===
When Antonio de Vea departed south, it was thought Pascual de Iriarte's party would depart soon when the repairs to Nuestra Señora del Rosario y Ánimas del Purgatorio were done. Delays in the repair made the party find another ship to sail south in the open sea.

Sixteen men of the party died on February 17 in the Evangelistas Islets, including the son of Pascual de Iriarte.

The incident happened as a detachment approached the islets in a skiff to install a metal plaque indicating the King of Spain's ownership of the territory. Hit by strong winds, the boat drifted away and the remnant of the expedition in charge of Pascual de Iriarte could not find it. Poor weather forced them to return north without further searches for the lost men. This expedition had reached approximately latitude 52°30' before returning north.

The survivors of Pascual de Iriarte's party arrived to the fortified settlement of Carelmapu near Chacao on March 6. Their ship was in poor condition and the crew, dehydrated.

== Aftermath ==
1682 map of the western coast of Patagonia copied from a Spanish original by Basil Ringrose. To the right the map shows the Evangelistas Islets just north of the Strait of Magellan. North is the left.

The expedition returned to the starting point of El Callao in April 1676. While the expedition was away 8,433 men had been mobilized in Peru to face an eventual conflict with the English. The military in Peru had also received large donations for the defense expenses.

The Viceroy of Peru Baltasar de la Cueva issued orders to the governments of Chile, Chiloé and Río de la Plata to inquire about the men who disappeared at Evangelistas Islets. However no information about their fate came forth and it is presumed that the boat wrecked in the same storm that forced the remaining party to leave the area. Overall a total of 16–17 men perished in it.

Antonio de Vea had concluded and successfully convinced Spanish authorities that rumours about English settlements in the fjords and channels of Patagonia were false. He noted that while there was an abundance of shellfish, sea lions and whales the establishment of a European settlement was not feasible given that adverse climate and poor soils made cultivation of crops impossible. However in 1676 new rumours originating in Europe reached the Spanish court. It was then claimed that England was preparing an expedition to settle the Straits of Magellan. The focus of Spanish attention to repel tentative English settlements shifted from the Pacific coast of Patagonia to the Straits of Magellan and Tierra del Fuego. Such a change meant that any English settlement could be approached by land from the north, which was not the case for the islands in western Patagonia.

Despite being in some sense a failure, the Antonio de Vea expedition led to increased Spanish knowledge on the Patagonian archipelagoes. The map of the area made by Antonio de Vea is a milestone in local cartography. As far as known today, no new Spanish maps were made of the west coast of Patagonia until José de Moraleda y Montero's explorations in the late 18th century.

Following this expedition there was an apparent hiatus of several decades in both missionary activity and the search of possible foreign colonies in the Pacific coast of Patagonia. Interest in the area arose again in the 1740s when the Spanish learned about the wreckage of HMS Wager on the coast of Wager Island in the Guayaneco Archipelago.

== See also ==
- City of the Caesars
- Coastal defence of colonial Chile
- Nicolás Mascardi
