= Mañihuales River =

River in Chile

Map of the Isthmus of Ofqui and Mañihuales River. In red a 19th-century canal project.

Mañihuales River or Mañiguales River (Spanish: Río Mañihuales, Río Mañiguales) is a river in the Isthmus of Ofqui, Aysén Region, Chile. Mañihuales River flows in a SE direction into the Gulf of San Esteban, close to the Bay of San Quintín. At its estuary it joints with San Tadeo River. The river drains much of the swampy Isthmus of Ofqui and originates near Presidente Ríos Lake.

Indigenous canoe-faring Chonos used the rivers as part of a north–south route that traversed the Taitao Peninsula and Isthmus of Ofqui. This route was unknown to the colonial Spanish who used San Tadeo River for the same purpose.
