= Baltasar de la Cueva, Count of Castellar =

Spanish viceroy

Don Baltasar de la Cueva Count of Castellar Marquis of Malagón
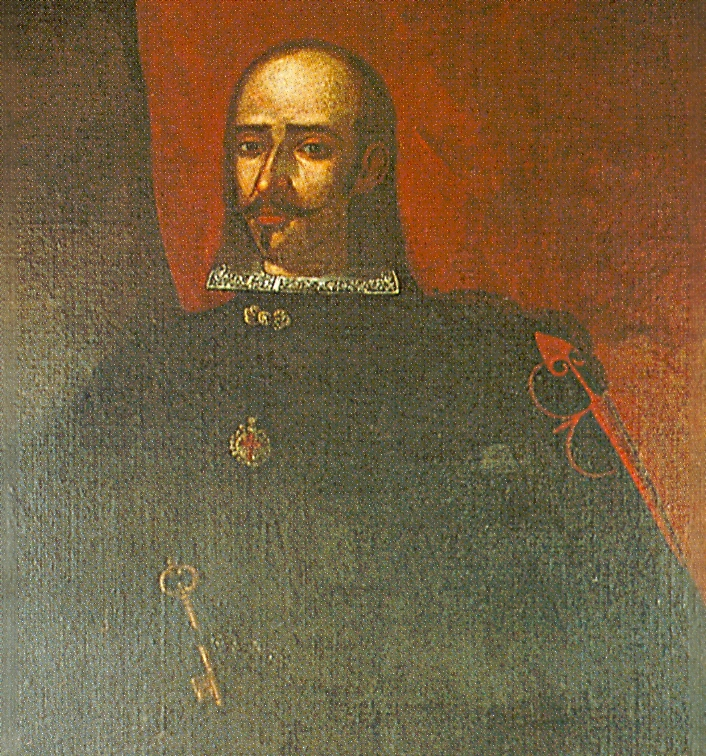

Viceroy of Peru
- In office August 15, 1674 – July 7, 1678
- Monarch: Charles II
- Preceded by: Bernardo de Iturriaza
- Succeeded by: Melchor Liñán y Cisneros

Personal details
- Born: 1626 Madrid
- Died: April 2, 1686 (aged 59–60)

Baltasar de la Cueva y Enríquez de Cabrera, iure uxoris Count of Castellar and Marquis of Malagón (sometimes Baltasar de la Cueva Enríquez de Cabrera y Arias de Saavedra) (1626 in Madrid – April 2, 1686) was viceroy of Peru from August 15, 1674 to July 7, 1678.

He was a younger son of the 7th Duke of Alburquerque, and brother of Francisco Fernández de la Cueva, 8th Duke of Alburquerque, who served as Viceroy of New Spain.

== Early life ==
He studied at the University of Salamanca, where the monarch granted him the position of dean of the choir in 1650. Four years later, he was appointed judge of the Royal Chancellery of Granada, and in 1659, prosecutor of the Royal Council of the Orders. He was also a member of the Royal and Supreme Council of the Indies, a knight of the Order of Santiago, a gentleman of the King's chamber, chief magistrate and marshal of Castile.

In 1665 he was sent as ambassador to the Republic of Venice and between 1666 and 1672, he was ambassador to the Holy Roman Empire in Vienna from where he intervened in the election of Michał Korybut Wiśniowiecki as new King of Poland.

== Viceroy of Peru ==
He was welcomed upon his arrival in Peru at the port of Callao on August 11, 1674 with the celebration of a corrida. There were also bullfights in Lima on November 6, 1674.

On November 15, 1674 he reported to the Spanish Court that it was necessary to reduce the number of holidays in the viceroyalty, because the number then "exceeded 35, that, together with religious holidays, almost means that the greater part of the year is a holiday". On May 14, 1676 the Court issued a decree approving a reduction.

During his period of administration, the laws of the Indies were compiled.

=== Defense of the Pacific coast ===
Viceroy Cueva took steps to protect the Pacific coast from English and Dutch incursions. At the time there were various indications and rumours indicating that the English had established bases in the fjords and channels of Patagonia. Following orders issued by Cueva Bartolomé Gallardo led in 1674 an expedition from Chiloé that reaching as far south as the Gulf of Penas (47° S). In this expedition an indigenous Chono named Cristóbal Talcapillán served as guide.

In 1675, Cueva sent a new and larger expedition led by Antonio de Vea to western Patagonia. The Antonio de Vea expedition of 1675–1676 dispelled rumours about English bases as it found that Cristóbal Talcapillán had been fabricating stories to please the Spanish. While the expedition was away 8,433 men were mobilized in Peru to face an eventual conflict with the English. The military in Peru had also received large donations for the defense expenses.

As sixteen men had disappeared at Evangelistas Islets in February 1676 during the expedition to Patagonia, Cueva ordered the governments of Chile, Chiloé and Buenos Aires to inquire about their fate. However no information about their fate came forth and it is presumed that the boat they travelled in wrecked in the same storm that forced the remaining party to leave the area.

According to Cueva, Talcapillán was condemned to two hundred lashes in addition to a lifetime sentence of penal labour of quarrying stone in San Lorenzo Island for use in the walls of the local presidio.

=== Uprising of Pedro Bohórquez ===
During this time a curious fraud occurred, resulting in an Indian uprising. Rumors of enormous wealth hidden generations earlier by the indigenous in caves and lakes circulated widely. A campesino born in Quito (some sources say he was born in Spain) named Pedro Bohórquez took advantage of these rumors. He announced that he was Inca Hualpa, a descendant of Atahualpa, and a prince of the Andes. He spoke perfect Quichúa and had been accepted as a prince by the Andean tribes of Tucumán (Argentina). He claimed that his subjects knew the locations of the hidden treasures, and with that claim he was able to take in the governor of Río de la Plata, Alonso Mercado y Villacorta, marqués de Villacorta.

Inca Hualpa told the governor that for him to be able to get the information from the few subjects who knew it, the governor would need to recognize him as Prince of the Land. Only that would give him the authority to take possession of the hidden treasures. The governor did allow the Indigenous to proclaim him prince, and he even left with an entourage to greet and congratulate Inca Huallpa. The latter set out to meet the governor. They met in Tafí and exchanged compliments.

When Viceroy Cueva heard of the fraud, he ordered that Bohórquez (Inca Hualpa) be arrested. Bohórquez returned to his followers in the Andes, where he denounced the "treason" of the Spanish and incited the Indigenous to revolt. The Calchaquíes took up arms, but they were disastrously defeated. The survivors were distributed to encomiendas. Other associated tribes were removed from their mountain valleys and transported to distant places. The Quilmes were transported to Buenos Aires, where a town still bears that name. Bohórquez himself was taken to Lima and hanged.

Other reports claim that Bohorques had earlier duped Viceroy Cueva, making him think that he had discovered the "fabulous country of Enin, and visited its gold palaces and precious treasures." The viceroy was deceived, and gave him 36 soldiers. Bohórquez then disappeared.

=== Removal from office ===
A conflict with the powerful merchants of Peru led to Cueva Enríquez's removal from office. On July 7, 1678 Archbishop Melchor Liñán y Cisneros replaced him as viceroy. He died in 1686.

== Marriage and children ==
He married Teresa María Arias de Saavedra, 7th Countess of Castellar in Madrid on June 22, 1664.
Two children were born of this marriage:

- Fernando de la Cueva y Saavedra, (1679-1721) 8th Count of Castellar and Villalonso, 5th Marquis of Malagón.
- Ana Catalina de la Cueva y Arias de Saavedra (1684-1752), 9th Countess of Castellar and Villalonso, Marchioness of Malagón, who married Manuel de Benavides y Aragón, 1st Duke of Santisteban del Puerto.

== Ilyas ibn Hanna al-Mawsili ==
Ilyas ibn Hanna al-Mawsili (Elias, son of John of Mosul), a Chaldean Christian of Assyrian descent, departed from Cádiz, Spain for Peru on February 13, 1675. He was almost certainly the first Assyrian to visit the New World. His mission was to raise money for the repair of an Assyrian church in Baghdad and to gather alms for the Chaldean community. Ilyas traveled to many places in the viceroyalty, and met the viceroy in Lima. The two became friends.

== Sources ==
- (in Spanish) Bohorques (Inca Huallpa)
- Ilyas ibn Hanna al-Mawsili
- Gallardo, Bartolomé (1886). "Expedición de Bartolomé Gallardo" (PDF). Anuario Hidrográfico de la Marina de Chile (in Spanish). Valparaíso. pp. 525–537.
- Barros Arana, Diego (2000) [1884]. "Capítulo VI". Historia General de Chile (in Spanish). Vol. V (2 ed.). Santiago, Chile: Editorial Universitaria. ISBN 956-11-1535-2.

Government offices
Preceded by Bernardo de Iturriaza	Viceroy of Peru; 1674–1678	Succeeded by Melchor Liñán y Cisneros
