= San Javier Island =

Island on the western coast of Patagonia

- Interactive map of San Javier Island

Geography
- Location: Pacific Ocean, on Chile's southern coast.
- Coordinates: 47.081403°S 74.366627°W

Administration
- Chile
- Region: Aysén
- Province: Capitán Prat
- Commune: Tortel

Demographics
- Population: 0
- Ethnic groups: Chonos and Caucahue (formerly)

Map of the Isthmus of Ofqui area. In red a 20th-century canal project.

San Javier Island (Spanish: Isla San Javier) is an island in the fjords and channels of southern Chile. The island lies immediately to the east of the Gulf of Penas and south of the Gulf of San Esteban. Administratively the island belong to the commune of Tortel in Aysén Region.

The Antonio de Vea expedition reached the island on December 25, 1675 calling it "Isla San Esteban".
