= English expedition to Valdivia =

John Narborough's expedition to Chile in 1670

Route of Narborough's expedition to Valdivia. Modern political boundaries between Chile and Argentina are shown.

By the late 1660s, the English rulers had considered invading Spanish-ruled Chile for several years. In 1655, Simón de Casseres proposed to Oliver Cromwell a plan to take over Chile with only four ships and a thousand men.

After the Anglo-Spanish War of 1662–1668, John Narborough was chosen to conduct a secretive voyage in the South Seas. He set sail from Deptford on 26 September 1669, and entered the Straits of Magellan in October of the following year. In 1670 he visited Port Desire in eastern Patagonia and claimed the territory for England. Having made landings at various points the expedition finally arrived to the heavily fortified Corral Bay on late December 1670. There the expedition established contact with the Spanish garrison whose commanders were highly suspicious of Narborough's intentions despite England being at peace with Spain. The Spanish demanded and received four English hostages in exchange for allowing Narborough's ship into the bay. Despite claiming to be in distress and in need of provisions the Spanish refused to give provisions given that the crews seemed to be in healthy condition and Narborough's true intentions being unclear to them. Narborough then unexpectedly made the decision to leave, and his ship departed Corral Bay on 31 December. The four English hostages and a man known as Carlos Enriques were left behind and ended up in the prisons of Lima where they were subject to lengthy interrogations, as the Spanish struggled to find out the goal of Narborough's expedition. Narborough returned home in June 1671 without achieving his original purpose. A narrative of the expedition was published at London in 1694 under the title An Account of several late Voyages and Discoveries to the South and North. The book included sailing directions through the Strait of Magellan and these later helped survivors of the Wager Mutiny reach Brazil.

== Spanish response ==
The Count of Molina de Herrera, Antonio de Tovar y Paz, learnt of Narborough's expedition while active as Ambassador to the Court of St James's. The information was probably complemented by rumours of naval activities spread by indigenous peoples of Patagonia, with whom the Spanish had contact in Chiloé. In response, the Spanish organized the Jerónimo Diez de Mendoza, Bartolomé Gallardo and Antonio de Vea expeditions on the three consecutive summers of 1674–1676, seeking news of any English presence. The expedition of Jerónimo Diez de Mendoza brought to Chacao, Chiloé, Cristóbal Talcapillán, a native Chono whose claims about "Morohuinca" (English) bases in the far south caused the Spanish authorities concern. The expedition of Antonio de Vea could find nothing to verify an English presence. The Spanish eventually concluded that Talcapillán was lying and dismissed him.

Another response to the expedition of Narborough was Fajardo y Álvarez de Toledo's proposal to fortify the Strait of Magellan. This proposal was turned down by the Spanish Council d'Etat. High costs, the difficulties of navigating the strait and a presumed low ability of the fortifications to prevent passage made the council decide against the proposal. Later the Council of the Indies ratified these conclusions ending the discussion.

=== Aguada del Inglés ===
The place Corral Bay that Narborough approached became known as Aguada del Inglés (lit. "water supply of the English"). A fort was built there in the late 18th century to avoid any landing by enemies of Spain. It was built following the 1779 plans of military engineer Antonio Duce. Military engineer Manuel Olaguer Feliú thought that the fort of Aguada del Inglés, the same place where Narborough had approached the coast, would be the landing place for an enemy attack on the fort system. For this purpose in Olaguer Feliú plans this fort had to concentrate most of the troops in case of war.

During the Capture of Valdivia in 1820 Thomas Cochrane disembarked Patriot troops in Aguada del Inglés leading to the fall of the whole fort system. This validated the plan of Olaguer Feliú.
