= List of explorations =

This is a list of some of the most important explorations of State Societies, in chronological order:

== Before 1400 ==
| Exploration | When | Who (explorer) |
|---|---|---|
| Northwest African coast (West Africa) | about 500 BC | Hanno the Navigator |
| The Mediterranean Sea | 5th century BC | Himilco the Navigator |
| Around western Europe to Thule Island | about 330 BC | Pytheas of Marseilles |
| Hawaiian Islands | By c. 800 | Hawaiʻiloa (mythical) |
| Greenland, Iceland, and Faroes | 900 | Gunnbjörn Ulfsson |
| Americas (North America) | 999 | Leif Ericson |
| Brazil (South America) - controversial | c. 14th century CE | Abu Bakr II |
| Sahelian kingdoms | 1351–1354 | Ibn Battuta |

== 15th century ==
| Exploration | When | Who (explorer) | Context |
|---|---|---|---|
| Great permanent wind wheel of Volta do Mar, the North Atlantic Gyre. Recognition of the Sargasso Sea, Madeira, Azores and West African coast. Cape Verde. | 1427–1460 | Several navigators: Portuguese or serving Portugal, most under the sponsorship of Henry the Navigator | Portuguese maritime exploration |
| Galápagos Islands or Rapa Nui | c. 1480 | Tupaq Inka Yupanki. 1594–1597. Rediscovered by the Spanish. | "Third Inca expansion" |
| Congo River, Angola and Namibia | 1482–1485 | Diogo Cão | Portuguese maritime exploration |
| South Africa. Connected the Atlantic to the Indian Ocean. South Atlantic Volta do Mar winds. | 1482–1485 | Bartolomeu Dias | Portuguese maritime exploration |
| Caribbean, Venezuela (South America) and Central America. Use and development of the North Atlantic routes. | 1493–1502 | Christopher Columbus | Spanish colonization of the Americas |
| Atlantic Ocean (outer routes) and Indian Ocean, sea route to India (Europe to Asia) | 1497–1499 | Vasco da Gama | Portuguese maritime exploration |
| Brazil, South Atlantic Volta do Mar, Indian Ocean, Madagascar, gate of the Red Sea (Bab-el-Mandeb Strait); India. Voyage that united Europe, Americas, Africa and Asia. | 1500–1501 | Pedro Álvares Cabral and Diogo Dias, among others | Portuguese maritime exploration Portuguese colonization of the Americas |

== 16th century ==
| Exploration | When | Who (explorer) | Context |
|---|---|---|---|
| Timor, Moluccas (Australasia - Pacific Ocean) | 1512–1513 | António de Abreu and Francisco Serrão | Portuguese maritime exploration |
| Circumnavigation of the globe. Connection from the Atlantic to the Pacific Ocean (Americas to Asia). | 1519–1522 | Ferdinand Magellan and Juan Sebastián Elcano | Spanish colonization of the Americas; Spanish colonization of the Philippines |
| Mexico | 1519–1521 | Hernán Cortés | Spanish colonization of the Americas; Spanish conquest of the Aztec Empire |
| Brazil, Paraguay, Bolivia and east of the Inca Empire | 1525–1527 | Aleixo Garcia | Spanish colonization of the Americas |
| Traveled across the Southwest of North America (completely) | 1528 | Álvar Núñez Cabeza de Vaca | Spanish colonization of the Americas |
| Peru, Inca Empire and Ecuador | 1531–1534 | Francisco Pizarro | Spanish colonization of the Americas; Spanish conquest of the Inca Empire |
| Ecuador and Brazil. Length of the Amazon River. | 1531–1534 | Francisco de Orellana | Spanish colonization of the Americas |
| Canada, Saint Lawrence River | 1534–1542 | Jacques Cartier | French colonization of the Americas |
| Bolivia, Argentine Northwest, Chile | 1535–1537 | Diego de Almagro | Spanish colonization of the Americas; Spanish conquest of the Inca Empire |
| Colombia, Conquest of the Muisca | 1536–1537 | Gonzalo Jiménez de Quesada | Spanish colonization of the Americas |
| Pacific Ocean's Volta do Mar (Asia to the Americas) | 1564–1565 | Andrés de Urdaneta | Spanish colonization of the Americas; Spanish colonization of the Philippines |
| North, Canada (Hudson Bay) | 1574–1631 | Henry Hudson | |
| North | 1594–1597 | Willem Barents | |

== 17th century ==
| Exploration | When | Who (explorer) |
|---|---|---|
| Siberia and Pacific coast | 1649–1641 | Ivan Yuryevich Moskvitin |
| Australia | c. 1640 | Makassar People before. Explored by Abel Tasman. |
| Tasmania, New Zealand | 1642–1643 | Abel Tasman |
| Brazil (circumnavigation), Paraguay, Bolivia and Peru. Connected the River Plate Basin to the Andes and to the mouth of the Amazon River. | 1648–1651 | António Raposo Tavares |
| Western Patagonia | [1669–1673 | Nicolás Mascardi |
| Western Patagonia | 1675–1676 | Antonio de Vea |

== 18th century ==
| Exploration | When | Who (explorer) |
|---|---|---|
| Oceania | 1768–1779 | James Cook |
| North Pacific, western Alaska, Far East Eurasian Coast | 1771 | Moric Benovsky |
| Central America and Latin America | 1799–1803 | Alexander von Humboldt |

== 19th century ==
| Exploration | When | Who (explorer) |
|---|---|---|
| Northwest Plateau of North America | 1804–1806 | Lewis and Clark Expedition |
| The North Magnetic Pole | 1831-06-01 | James Clark Ross |
| Interior of Africa | 1851–1873 | David Livingstone |
| The Northwest Passage | 1850–1854 | Robert McClure |
| The Burke and Wills expedition (Central Australia) | 1860–1861 | Robert O'Hara Burke and William John Wills |
| Inland eastern Patagonia | 1875–1877 | Perito Moreno |
| Exploration of the Zambeze river region, Central Africa, Angola, Mozambique, Zambia, Zaire | 1877 | Serpa Pinto |
| The Northern Sea Route | 1878 | Adolf Erik Nordenskiöld |

== 20th century ==
| Exploration | When | Who (explorer) |
|---|---|---|
| The South Magnetic Pole | January 16, 1909 | Douglas Mawson, Edgeworth David, and Alistair Mackay |
| The North Pole | April 6, 1909 | Robert Peary |
| The South Pole | December 14, 1911 | Roald Amundsen |
| The South Pole | January 17, 1912 | Robert Falcon Scott |
| Mount Everest summit | May 29, 1953 | Sir Edmund Hillary and Tenzing Norgay |
| The Moon | July 20, 1969 | Neil Armstrong, Michael Collins, and Buzz Aldrin (Apollo 11) |
| Mars | 1960–present | NASA and other space agency exploration robots |

== See also ==
- Age of Discovery
- Exploration of Australia
- Geographical exploration
- List of explorers
- List of lost expeditions
- List of Russian explorers
- Exploration of the High Alps
- Portugal in the period of discoveries
- Chronology of European exploration of Asia
