= Bartolomé Gallardo =

Criollo soldier (1640–1699)

Bartolomé Diez Gallardo y Andrade (c. 1640 – 1699 in Concepción) was a criollo soldier from Chiloé. He is known for leading a 1674–1675 expedition to the fjords and channels of Patagonia, participating in the following year in the Antonio de Vea expedition to the same area and for serving as Governor of Chiloé from 1686 to 1688.

== Biography ==
Bartolomé Gallardo was one of various sons of Francisco Gallardo and Bartolina Andrade y Oyarzún, both of whom belonged to the upper echelons of Chiloé's colonial society. From a young age, he pursued a military career and by 1674 he had reached the rank of sergeant major.

Gallardo's 1674–1675 expedition was ordered by the Viceroy of Peru Baltasar de la Cueva. The expedition passed by the archipelagoes of Guaitecas, Chonos, it entered San Rafael Lake and crossed the isthmus of Ofqui. It reached as far as the Gulf of Penas (47° S). Indigenous Chono Cristóbal Talcapillán served as guide. Lacking a studies in cartography and being prone to believe whatever indigenous informants told him his contributions to the geography of Patagonia are in hindsight considered of poor quality.

In the 1675–1676 expedition led by Antonio de Vea he was accompanied by Talcapillán and the Jesuit Antonio de Amparán. In January 1676 de Vea found out that Cristóbal Talcapillán had fabricated his stories about the presence of Englishmen in the west coast of Patagonia. Defending himself Talcapillán accused Bartolomé Gallardo and his father to coerce him into lying. Talcapillán was eventually convicted to lifetime penal labour and two hundred lashes for giving a false alarm.

Gallardo spent his lasts years in Concepción, and he died in the same city in late 1699.
