= Jesuit missions =

The phrase Jesuit missions usually refers to a Jesuit missionary enterprise in a particular area, involving a large number of Jesuit priests and brothers, and lasting over a long period of time.

== List of some Jesuit missions ==
- Circular Mission of Chiloé Archipelago
- Jesuit missions among the Guaraní
- Jesuit Missions of Chiquitos - a UNESCO Heritage Site
- Jesuit Missions in China
- Jesuit Missions in North America
- Jesuit Missions amongst the Huron
- History of Roman Catholicism in Belize
- Jesuit Missions in Northern Sonora and Southern Arizona
- Jesuit Missions of La Santísima Trinidad de Paraná and Jesús de Tavarangue
- Jesuit Missions of Moxos

== See also ==
- Jesuit Missions UK, a charity based out of Wimbledon, England.
