= Martín Olleta =

Chono chieftain

Martín Olleta was a Chono chieftain who was an important broker between Spanish authorities in Chiloé Archipelago and indigenous people of the fjords and channels of Patagonia. He is known for rescuing the survivors of the wreck of HMS Wager in 1742. He was identified as chieftain by the British and referred to as "gobernadorcillo de dicha nación chonos" ("little governor of the Chono nation") by the Spanish governor of Chiloé Victoriano Martínez de Tineo. He used a rod with a silver handle as symbol of authority.

== Rescue of HMS Wager survivors ==
Olleta led a party of indigenous Chono that visited Captain Cheap's stranded group in Wager Island, Guayaneco Archipelago. This happened fifteen days after a group of British sailors returned to Wager Island after failing to round Taitao Peninsula with an improvised barge. The Spanish language proficiency of the Chonos was enough to communicate with the Spanish-speaking surgeon of the British party. After some negotiation, the Chono agreed to guide Cheap's group to a small Spanish settlement up the coast, using an overland route to avoid the peninsula. The castaways traded the barge and iron objects for the journey. Iron was highly valued by the Chono as this metal was even scarce in the Spanish settlements further north. The survivors of HMS Wager boarded the dalcas of Olleta's party and headed north. Martín Olleta led the survivors through an unusual route across Presidente Ríos Lake in Taitao Peninsula avoiding the common route through San Tadeo River and San Rafael Lake. Before handing over the English to Spanish authorities, Martín Olleta's party stopped somewhere south of Chiloé Island to hide all iron objects, likely to avoid having them confiscated. When Spanish authorities learned that Lieutenant Hamilton had been lost in the way north, they compelled Olleta to go back south and find him, which he actually did.

Scholar Ximena Urbina conjectures that Martín Olleta must have lived close to the Spanish and heard from other natives of the wreckage. Thus the rescue was not by chance but an enterprise done with prior knowledge of the Spanish interest in foreigners and of the valuable loot to be found at the wreckage.
