= Morohuinca =

Term used among the indigenous peoples of southern Chile

Morohuinca was a term used among the indigenous peoples of southern Chile, chiefly Mapuches and Chonos, during the Colonial Epoch to refer to the European enemies of Spain. This meant chiefly the Dutch and English. The term derives from the fusion of the Spanish word "moro" (Moor) and Mapudungun word "huinca" meaning Spaniard or foreigner but meant originally to mean Inca invaders. For example the expedition of John Narborough in 1670 was recognised as a morohuinca. A few years later Cristóbal Talcapillán referred to supposed English settlers in Patagonia as morohuincas.

== See also ==
- Antonio de Vea expedition
- City of the Caesars
- Dutch expedition to Valdivia
