= KBF =

KBF may refer to:

- Kakauhua language, ISO 639-3 language code kbf
- Kelvin body force, a force on a fluid in a magnetic field
- King Baudouin Foundation, a Belgian organisation
- Kirkby-in-Furness, a village in England
- Kirkby-in-Furness railway station, England, National Rail station code KBF
- Knott's Berry Farm, an amusement park in California
