= Winka =

Winka may refer to

- Huinca, a word used by indigenous South American Mapuche tribes to refer to non-Mapuche, white Chilean or Argentine people
- Winka Chan, a member of Hong Kong female pop group Collar
- Winka Dubbeldam (born 1966), a Dutch-American architect and academic
