= Diego de Zecenarro =

Spanish military officer

Diego de Zecenarro was a Spanish military man, captain of infantry of the royal armies of the Viceroyalty of Peru.

== Expedition ==
In 1677, together with his brother, Ensign Martín de Zecenarro, and numerous Franciscan religious led by Fray Juan de Ojeda, Diego travelled to what are now the provinces of Carabaya and Sandia, in the Peruvian department of Puno.

The purpose of this expedition was to advance the exploration of the peoples and the towns surrounding the lower basin of the Tambopata and Inambari rivers (discovering the latter), they eradicated local religions and established the Catholic religion by founding missionary posts.

They also attempted to find the mythical Paititi, as evidenced by various letters from the captain to the Viceroy.

== Boundary dispute between Peru and Bolivia ==
The official report signed by De Zecenarro on September 17, 1677, addressed to Viceroy Baltasar de la Cueva y Enríquez de Cabrera, was used by the diplomat Víctor Manuel Maúrtua to prepare the legal basis put forward by Peru to keep Carabaya and Sandia in the Peruvian territory. The same framework was used two centuries later, in the early years of the twentieth century, as a base for boundaries of the republics of Peru and Bolivia.
