= Guayaneco Archipelago =

Archipelago in Chile

Coordinates: 47°45′S 75°5′W

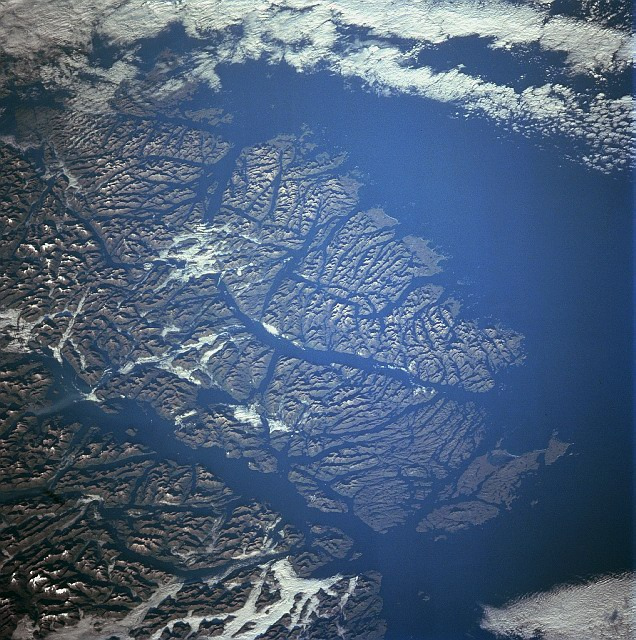
Guayaneco Archipelago (bottom, right) from space, June 1998

The Guayaneco Archipelago (Spanish: Archipiélago Guayaneco) is an archipelago in southern Chile. It consists of 2 main islands, Wager Island (to the east), es:Isla Byron (to the west), and many smaller islands.

It was heavily glaciated during the most recent ice age. These glaciers dissected these mountain islands into a series of deep river valleys and glacial troughs. Today these glacial troughs are deep channels and fjords. The islands of the Guayaneco Archipelago comprise a series of elongated islands and deep bays that are the traces of a drowned coastal range. A number of deep channels are traversing generally north to south through the islands. These include the Messier Channel in the lower left portion of the image, and the Fallos Channel near the center of the image. Forests cover the lower slopes of the mountains throughout the many islands. Human settlement on these islands is scarce.

== History ==
The archipelago is thought to have been a cohabitational contact zone between different canoe-faring indigenous peoples living north and south of it. John Montgomery Cooper points out that it possibly made up a "meeting ground of quasi-friendly bilingual tribes".

The islands were first reached by Jesuits based in Chiloé in 1613. In 1741 the British warship HMS Wager (a part of Commodore George Anson's squadron) ran aground at Wager Island, Guayaneco Archipelago. The survivors of the wreck were rescued by a party of indigenous Chono travelling in dalcas and led by Martín Olleta.

Following the forceful depopulation of Chonos Archipelago by the Spanish in the 18th century, many Chonos sought refuge in the Guayaneco Archipelago. With some likehood, this led to the assimilation of Chono families into the Kawésqar who survive into the present.
