= Caucahue =

Caucahue is an ethnonym used by the Chono, the Huilliche and Spanish of Chiloé for a group of canoe-faring people that inhabited the archipelagoes south of the Gulf of Penas. The term is one of the various ethnonyms recorded by the Spanish in the 18th century in the fjords and channels of Patagonia. The Caucahue spoke a different language from the Chono. Archaeologist Ricardo Alvarez posits that the Caucahue and other groups appeared relatively late in colonial records because this was the time when contact became more common. Alvarez also posits the Caucahue disappeared from the historical record by merging into the Kawésqar to the south and the people of Chiloé to the north. According to historian Ximena Urbina and co-workers, the Caucahue are essentially ancient Kawésqar. "Caucahues" described in sources as "gigantic" may have been Tehuelches.

== See also ==
- Antonio de Vea expedition
- Caucahue Island
- Indigenous peoples in Chile
