= Wayteka language =

Spurious language of Chile

Wayteka
- Wurk-wur-we, "Chono"
- Created by: Liaras Samitier
- Date: 1967
- Setting and usage: Chile
- Purpose: Constructed language: Wayteka
- Sources: Mapudungun, Gününa Küne, Kawesqar, Tehuelche

Language codes
- ISO 639-3: None (mis)
- Glottolog: None

Wayteka (Wurk-wur-we, "Chono") is the name applied to the supposed language of a spurious vocabulary claimed to be from an indigenous language of the Gulf of Penas in Chile.

== Samitier (1967) ==
The following list of purported "Chono" (Wayteka) words is taken from Samitier (1967). It was later found to be spurious by Campbell (2012), consisting of vocabulary from various languages of the region, such as Mapudungun, Gününa Küne, Kawésqar, Tehuelche, and some which appear to have been invented.

Chono (Wayteka)	English gloss (translated)	Spanish gloss (original)	notes (English translations)	notes (Spanish original)
tónkekoq	grandfather	abuelo	same as 'old man'	igual que ‘hombre viejo’
maáksa	water	agua	drinking water	agua potable
kamóka	wing	ala		
neks	bitter	amargo	bitter taste	gusto amargo
káaʃer	friend	amigo	same as 'like a son'	igual que ‘como un hijo’
saco	anchor	ancla		según Fitz Roy
noksawlek	year	año		
walete	plow	arado	wooden stick for removing dirt	según Fitz Roy. Pala para remover la tierra en las islas. Era de madera
mékta	tree	árbol	any tree	cualquier árbol
walt	bow	arco	bow for shooting arrows	arco para disparar flechas
kénkapon	rainbow	arco iris	lit. 'eye of sky'	significa ‘ojo del cielo’
káukan	bustard	avutarda		
tékam	blue	azul	cf. tepon 'color of the sky'	también, tepon, que significa ‘color del cielo’
katáiʃ	whale	ballena		
táiʃkoq	beard	barba	beard of old man	barba del ‘hombre viejo’
léikse	drink	beber		
taiʃo	moustache	bigote		
wékorq	white	blanco	like foam of ocean waves	como espuma de la ola
láur	mouth	boca	lit. 'to speak'; cf. la 'tongue'	‘para hablar’, igual que la, lengua
rálm	ember	brasa		
tákfo	sorcerer	brujo		igual que Fo, un brujo legendario
mókstap	head	cabeza		
wampus	canoe	canoa	pirogue	piragua (dalca en araucano)
pon	sky	cielo		
ɣas’e	clarity	claridad	daylight (without sun); also daytime deity	la luz del día, sin sol. Divinidad diurna ... citada en sus mitos.
swa’kalk	heart	corazón		que golpea adentro
ka’wais	Chiloé	Chiloé Island	our 'island of stones'	nuestra ‘isla de piedra’
kémaway, ketámaway	hut	choza		
arks	finger	dedo	also called: lek 'one'	también lo llamaban lek, que quiere decir uno
wárʃɣa	day	día	from dawn to night	desde el amanecer hasta la noche
mótok	doubt	dudar	same as 'to think'	igual que ‘pensar’
kseksel	age	edad		
ʃérri-ʃúpon	good spirit	espíritu bueno	lit. 'son of the sky'	el ‘hijo del cielo’
sacima	evil spirit	espíritu malo		
terk	spit	escupir		
kíχie	star	estrella		
oméke	lantern	farol		
pénkel	cold	frío		
ʃéku	fire	fuego		
wur	speak	hablar		
ʃer	son	hijo		
ʃérse	daughter	hija		
téka	native man	hombre nativo		
kúwa	white man	hombre blanco		Fitz Roy anota kubba
yagépo	winter	invierno	lit. 'time without sun'	significa ‘tiempo sin sol’
wa, we	island	isla		
ʃo	lip	labio		
táka	wolf	lobo	same as 'seal'	igual que foca. Píur según; Juan I. Molina.
gérak	bright star	lucero		
ay	place	lugar	cf. aysen 'place of drizzle/fog'	aysen, significa lugar de las lloviznas o neblinas
kiráke	moon	luna		
omése	mother	madre		
ma’a	mother (voc.)	mamá	first words of infants	primera voz de los niños
ksewa	hand	mano		
wanéʃe	woman	mujer		
ksárro	blanket	manta	blanket made from dyed animal skins	carro, según Molina. Manta de pieles teñidas
nékseks	swim	nadar		
ko’o	black	negro		
konkóse	girl	niña		
konkok	boy	niño		
λosen	snow	nieve		
sen	fog	niebla	also 'drizzle'	también ‘llovizna’
nenke	no	no	negation	negación
pónse	cloud	nube	means 'fog of the sky'	‘niebla del cielo’
cincimen	otter	nutria		según Juan I. Molina
ʃóko	ocean	océano	Pacific Ocean	el océano Pacífico
pérkse	darkness	obscuridad	same as 'night'	igual que la noche. Divinidad nocturna
ténkok	father	padre		
áwitem	paradise	paraíso	afterworld	mansión en que imaginaban a sus muertos
táiʃ	hair	pelo		
téwa	dog	perro	dogs to help with fishing	perro, que empleaban para ayudarles en la pesca
akína	priest	papa	priests in the forest	papas silvestres. Darwin anota el mismo vocablo
ménka	foot	pie		
éwenk	blood	sangre	animal blood	sangre de animales
wíwe	whistle (v., n.)	silbar, silbido		
kilineχa	rope	soga	rope from plant fibers	soga vegetal según Juan I. Molina
gépon	sun	sol		
wil	south	sud	also 'southerly wind'	también llamaban asi al viento frío del sud
sékewil	dream	sueño		
tiki	table, plank	tabla o tablón	canoe planks	tablones de las canoas. Según Molina también nombre de un árbol
wask	earth	tierra		
kákwe	green	verde	same as prairie grass	igual que el pasto de las vegas
pokéye	summer	verano	sunny season, 'to shine (of sky)'	tiempo de sol, ‘brilla el cielo’
áriɣm	wind	viento	storm winds only	únicamente el viento de la tempestad
lek	one	uno		
wo, wotok	two	dos		dos, ‘un par’
kselek	three	tres		
wowo	four	cuatro	2 x 2	dos pares
ksewo	five	cinco	5	una mano
kselekwo	six	seis	2 x 3	tres, dos veces
ksewowo	seven	siete	3+4	tres, más cuatro
ksewowolek	eight	ocho	5+2+1	una mano, un par y uno
lekwonenk	nine	nueve	5+5-1	dos manos menos uno
wire	ten	diez	5+5	o wire-ksewo, dos manos completas
