= Cristóbal Talcapillán =

Cristóbal Talcapillán Don Cristóbal
- Born: c. 1649; Fjords and channels of Patagonia
- Died: Possibly San Lorenzo Island, Peru
- Known for: Misleading statements ushering the Antonio de Vea expedition

Cristóbal Talcapillán (born c. 1649), also known as Don Cristóbal, was a Chono man who became known for his role in ushering the expeditions of Bartolomé Gallardo (1674–1675) and Antonio de Vea (1675–1676) into the fjords and channels of Patagonia.

== Talcapillán's allegations and map ==
In the early 1670s the English sailor John Narborough explored the coasts of Patagonia. This caused great alarm among Spanish authorities who feared the establishment of an English base in Patagonia. As a consequence various expeditions were sent from the Spanish settlements of Chiloé to the south. Jerónimo Díaz de Mendoza led an expedition in 1674 that having failed to find any Europeans in Patagonia went back to Chiloé with Cristóbal Talcapillán and other indigenous Chono they encountered. In 1674 he was about 25 years old according to estimations of the Spanish. In Chacao Cristóbal Talcapillán rapidly learned Veliche which was the main language of Chiloé –including the Spanish settlements– at the time. While there he began to give indications about the existence of European settlements in the archipelagoes of Patagonia. Spanish authorities learned about this and interviewed him. He drew accurate "maps" of the territory south of Chiloé giving credibility to his allegations. Authorities went was far as sending Cristóbal Talcapillán to Lima, the capital of the viceroyalty, to investigate his claims. Cristóbal Talcapillán was sent back to Chiloé and it was then decided that a major expedition should be sent to the verify the presence of Englishmen or other Europeans.

== Guide and translator in the Antonio de Vea expedition ==
Thus an expedition led by Antonio de Vea departed from El Callao in September 1675. Picking Cristóbal Talcapillán in Chiloé where the expedition was also outfitted with nine dalcas. During the navigation in the fjords and channels, the Spanish began to doubt the indications of Cristóbal Talcapillán. Cristóbal Talcapillán's help in translating interrogations of a captured Chono woman suggested his translations were fabrications. Subsequently, when he was enquired about his allegations Talcapillán retracted indications about where to find iron anchors and said he had been coerced to lie by Bartolomé Gallardo and his father Francisco Gallardo. It is possible that the fabrications of Cristóbal Talcapillán were done to appease the Spanish as he learned about Spanish culture and what kind of things were of their interest.

Having realized that Cristóbal Talcapillán was highly unreliable the expedition returned to Chiloé in late January 1676. The possibility of Talcapillán's reports being false was already considered when Antonio de Vea received his instructions in Peru. In such case Talcapillán was to be left in Chiloé at the disposal of Spanish authorities.

== Prisoner in Peru ==
Eventually Talcapillán was punished for the false alarm. According to the Viceroy of Peru Baltasar de la Cueva Talcapillán was condemned to two hundred lashes in addition to a lifetime sentence of penal labour. He was to quarry stone in San Lorenzo Island for use in the walls of the local presidio.
