= Caucahue Island =

Island in Los Lagos Region, Chile

Cahucahue
Native name: kawkawé, kawkagwé
- Interactive map of Cahucahue

Geography
- Location: Los Lagos Region
- Coordinates: 42°8′42″S 73°24′17″W
- Adjacent to: Caucahue Channel, Pacific Ocean
- Total islands: 1

Administration
- Chile

Demographics
- Population: 354 (2017)
- Ethnic groups: Caucahue descendants, Mapuche people, Veliche people

Caucahué is an island located in the Caucahué Channel, Chiloé Province, Los Lagos Region (Region of the Lakes), Commune of Quemchi in southern Chile. It has a population of 354 according to the 2017 census, this is almost a halving relative to the 638 inhabitants recorded in the 2001 Chilean census. The island supplies the city of Quemchi with farm and sea products.

The name Cahucahué comes from Mapudungun (the Mapuche language), and means “place of many seagulls”, from the words káwka or kawkaw, meaning "big seagull", and we, meaning place"'.

Caucahue Island used to be home to the now-extinct Caucahue people. The Caucahue were one of the canoe-going peoples that lived in the southernmost regions of Chile. They were hunter gatherers and made good use of the sea's resources, living off sea food, seaweed and minor game that they found on the island and its surrounding areas. Along with farming, today's inhabitants of the island still use the sea as a livelihood, and sell their seafood and farm produce at the Quemchi free market located right across the channel on Chiloé Island.

The island is divided into four parts: Queler, Morro Lobos Bajo, Morro Lobos Alto and Quinterquén. It has four schools, each with one teacher: "Escuela Queler", "Escuela Caucahué", "Escuela Morro Lobos" and "Escuela Quinterquén". It is connected to the mainland via the town of Quemchi. A daily boat service runs from Quemchi to the island and private boats are also available for the 20 minute trip.

Caucahue's natural vegetation is Valdivian temperate rain forest and it has a temperate climate with constant rain all year round.
