= Gulf of Penas =

Body of water in Chile

Coordinates: 47°22′S 74°50′W

The Gulf of Penas (Golfo de Penas in Spanish, meaning "gulf of distress") is a body of water located south of the Taitao Peninsula, Chile.

== Geography ==
It is open to the westerly storms of the Pacific Ocean, but it affords entrance to several natural harbours. Among these are the gulfs of Tres Montes and San Esteban and San Quintín, and Tarn Bay at the entrance to Messier Channel. To the south of the gulf lies Guayaneco Archipelago and to the east lies San Javier Island and then the mainland.

== History ==
Spanish explorers and Jesuits, sailing south from Chiloé Archipelago in the 17th and 18th centuries, regularly avoided rounding the Taitao Peninsula by entering the Gulf, after a brief land crossing at the isthmus of Ofqui.

In 1741, the British warship HMS Wager ran aground along the coast of (future) Wager Island, in the southeastern region of the Gulf, while attempting to tack from a lee shore during a storm. Some of the survivors were rescued by Chono chieftain Martín Olleta and his men, who took them aboard their dalcas to the Spanish settlements of Chiloé Archipelago.

In December 1843, the Chilean schooner Ancud rescued the survivors of wrecked French ship Fleuris on the shores of the Gulf.

== Flora and fauna ==
Local marine and terrestrial wildlife includes:

- Banded wood frog
- Chilean dolphin
- Chiloé Island frog
- Coypu
- Dusky dolphin
- Emerald forest frog
- Grey wood frog
- Guiña
- Leopard seal
- Long-finned pilot whale
- Marbled wood frog
- Marine otter
- Nibaldo's wood frog
- Orca
- Patagonian toad
- Puma
- Puerto Eden frog
- Sei whale
- South American gray fox
- South Andean deer (or huemul)
- South American fur seal
- South American sea lion
- Southern elephant seal
- Southern pudú
- Southern right whale
- Southern right whale dolphin
- Southern river otter
- Sperm whale

The Gulf is a suitable habitat for a number of species of baleen whales, and is speculated to be a wintering/calving ground for a population of the critically endangered southern right whale.

== See also ==
- Fjords and channels of Chile
- Laguna San Rafael National Park
