= Whaling in Chile =

Commercial hunting of whales in Chile

Whaling was an important economic activity in Chile from the 19th century to 1983, when the last whale was hunted in Chilean waters.

Indigenous, Basque, New England, Norwegian and Japanese whaling traditions have been present in Chilean waters.

== Prehispanic and colonial whaling ==
Scavenging of whales may have been practised by the canoe-faring peoples of the fjords and channels of southern Chile during Prehispanic times. This mean that only weakened or stranded whales where hunted. Similarly to the peoples from the fjords and channels, inhabitants of more northern parts of Chile practised scavenging from at least colonial times to well into the 20th century.

== 19th century whaling ==
Whaling in Chilean waters began with United States whalers venturing into Chile in the 19th century. In New England, whaling had developed rapidly in the 18th century. The presence of New England whalers in Chilean Waters catalyzed the local whaling industry which had developed considerably by 1868, with 19 whaling ships being registered in Chile. Chilean registered whalers made annual travels to Galápagos Islands and the Gulf of Panama in search of whales.

== 20th century whaling ==
In the early 20th century, whaling began to be conducted with modern techniques developed in Norway. For this purpose, whaling companies were formed in Valdivia, Chiloé and Punta Arenas. In the 1960s, the whaling industry declined severely, and the processing factories in Bajo Molle and Quintay closed in 1965 and 1967, respectively. The last processing factory, in Chome, closed in 1983.

Whaling companies were:

- Compañía Chileno Noruega de Pesca
- Sociedad Ballenera de Corral

Whale hunting is richly portrayed by Francisco Coloane in his books.

=== Norwegian whaling in Magallanes ===
Adolf Amandus Andresen immigrated to Chile in 1894 where he prospered as a tugboat captain. He later returned to Norway to learn about the whaling industry in Finnmark. In 1903, Andresen, with a harpoon cannon mounted on one of his tugboats, shot his first whale in Chilean waters. He later managed the Sociedad Ballenera de Magallanes (the Magellan Whaling Company) with a shore station in Bahía Aguila.

Andresen's 1907 catch of 79 right whales drew competition to the area, though the success went unmatched. In 1914, he set out from San Pedro with a factory ship, Sobraon, and two catchers to hunt humpbacks along the coast from Chile, Peru, Ecuador and on to Columbia, following the migrating animals. Andresen was the first person to raise the Chilean flag on Antarctica. However, his whaling business ultimately failed as a result of economic depression and the collapsing world market for whale oil.

Encouraged by Andresen, another Norwegian whaler, Christen Christensen, sent the Vesterlide to San Pedro, captained by his own son, to hunt blue whales in the Bay of Corcovado. Christensen also financially backed another whaling company, Sociedad Ballenera y Pescadora, which was operated by H.C. Korsholm in Valdivia. Unfortunately, the returns were inadequate and both companies were liquidated by 1913.
