= Wingka =

Exonym in Mapudungun

Wingka or huinca is an exonym used by indigenous Mapuche to refer to non-Mapuche, white Chileans and Argentines. The term originated in the area of Concepción in Chile from the Mapuche language word we-inka, meaning new-Inca. This is a reference to Inca invaders who were later taken over by new Spanish invaders. This word is rendered as "inga" by Pedro de Valdivia in a letter to Charles V, Holy Roman Emperor. At the time of the initial contact Mapuches called horses "hueque ingas" in reference to the hueque according to Valdivia's letter to the Emperor.

In modern times wingka has been used as a pejorative.

== See also ==
- Morohuinca
- Yanacona
