= Ilyas ibn al-Qassis Hanna al-Mawsili =

17th-century Syriac Christian priest and author

Ilyās ibn al-Qassīs Ḥannā al-Mawṣilī, (الياس ابن حنا القوشي الموصلي ) also known as Elias of Babylon was a late 17th century Syriac Christian priest and author. Originally from Baghdad, Ottoman Empire, though his name in Arabic implies his family was from Mosul. An ethnic Assyrian, he was a member of the Chaldean Catholic Church. He is known for his accounts of his travels in Western Europe and the Spanish colonies in the New World, which is considered to be the oldest record in Arabic-language literature devoted to the Americas. He was named Don Elías de Babilonia by the Spaniards.

His manuscripts were rediscovered in the library of the Syriac Catholic Church's Archdiocese of Aleppo around 1900 by the Lebanese Jesuit Antoine Rabbath, who published the texts in the Arabic-language Catholic journal Al-Machriq between 1905 and 1906. The handwritten account is composed of 269 pages and contains his voyage to the New World, being followed by the history of the discovery and the conquest of America by the Spaniards. Another manuscript of the text is located in the India Office Library in London (MS 719), and it is known that several manuscripts existed in the libraries of Iraq before the Iraq War.

== Translations ==
- Mawṣilī, Ilyās (1992). Montanaro, Marina (ed.). Il primo orientale nelle Americhe (in Italian). Mazara del Vallo: Liceo Ginnasio Gian Giacomo Adria.
- Mawṣilī, Ilyās (1992). Van Leeuwen, Richard (ed.). Iljaas al-Mausili: een Arabier in Zuid-Amerika, 1675–1683 (in Dutch). Amsterdam: Middle East Research Associates.
- Mawṣilī, Ilyās (2002). "Europe and South America". In Matar, Nabil (ed.). In the lands of the Christians: Arabic travel writing in the seventeenth century. Routledge. ISBN 0415932289.
- Mawṣilī, Ilyās (2003). Farah, Caesar E. (ed.). An Arab's journey to colonial Spanish America: the travels of Elias al-Mûsili in the seventeenth century. Syracuse University Press. ISBN 0815607903.
- Mawṣilī, Ilyās (2011). Schmidt, Jean-Jacques (ed.). Un Irakien en Amérique au XVIIe siècle, 1668-1683 (in French). Arles: Sindbad. ISBN 2742795200.

== See also ==
- Ahmad al-Mansur
- Piri Reis map (1513)
- Tarih-i Hind-i garbi (1580)
