= Chono language =

Extinct language of Chile

Chono
- Native to: Chile
- Region: Chonos Archipelago, Chiloé Archipelago
- Ethnicity: Chono people
- Extinct: 1875
- Language family: Language isolate

Language codes
- ISO 639-3: None (mis)
- Glottolog: chon1248

Chono is a poorly attested extinct language of confusing classification. It is attested primarily from an 18th-century catechism, which is not translated into Spanish. Various placenames in the Chiloé Archipelago have Chono etymologies.

== Classification ==
Viegas Barros, who postulates a relationship between Kawésqar and Yahgan, believes that 45% of the Chono vocabulary and grammatical forms correspond to one of those languages, though it is not close to either.

Glottolog concludes that "There are lexical parallels with Mapuche as well as Qawesqar, ... but the core is clearly unrelated." They characterize Chono as a language isolate, though only as it relates to Mapuche and Kawésqar.

Campbell (2012) concludes that a language called Wayteka or Wurk-wur-we by Llaras Samitier (1967), and which also went by the geographical name "Chono", is spurious, with the source material being a list of mixed and perhaps invented vocabulary.

== Phonology ==
The phonology of Chono can be tentatively reconstructed in part from the data provided by Basauni (1975). Syllables are frequently, but not necessarily, closed. There are few consonant clusters but frequent vowel clusters.

=== Consonants ===
The consonant table shows the IPA representation as given by Adelaar (2004), with symbols that differ in angle brackets.

Consonants
		Labial	Dental	Alveolar	Palatal	Velar	Glottal
Nasal		m		n	nʲ ⟨nʸ⟩	ŋ	
Plosive/Affricate	voiceless	p		t	t͡ɕ ⟨č⟩	k	
Plosive/Affricate	voiced	b				g	
Fricative		f	z (Note: ⟨z⟩ may have been realized as [θ], [ts], [z], or [s], among other possible realizations.)	s		x	h
Approximant		w			j		
Lateral				l	lʲ ⟨lʸ⟩		

=== Vowels ===
Vowels
	Front	Central	Back
High	i		u
Mid	e		o
Low		a	

In addition to the five monophthongs, Chono appears to have had eight diphthongs, which Adelaar represents as a vowel and a glide: ⟨aw⟩, ⟨ew⟩, ⟨ow⟩, ⟨ay⟩, ⟨yu⟩, ⟨wa⟩, ⟨we⟩, and ⟨wi⟩.

== Works cited ==
- Adelaar, Willem (2004). The Language of the Andes. with Pieter C. Muysken. Cambridge University Press. doi:10.1017/CBO9780511486852. ISBN 978-0-521-36275-7.
- Bausani, Alessandro (1975). "Nuovi materiali sulla lingua Chono". In Cerulli, Ernesta; Della Ragione, Gilda (eds.). Atti del XL Congresso Internazionale degli Americanisti (Rome-Genoa, 3–12 September 1972). Vol. 3: Linguistica – Folklore – Storia americana – Sociologia. Genoa: Tilgher. pp. 107–116.
