= San Tadeo River =

River south of Laguna San Rafael, in Aysen, Chile

Coordinates: 46°45′39″S 74°13′31″W

Map of the Isthmus of Ofqui and San Tadeo River. In red a 19th century canal project.

San Tadeo River (Spanish: Río San Tadeo) is a river in the Isthmus of Ofqui, Aysén Region, Chile. San Tadeo River flows in a SSW direction into the Gulf of San Esteban. It drains much of the swampy Isthmus of Ofqui and the meltwater from San Quintín Glacier's proglacial lake.

The river has historically been used as an importante lane to cross the isthmus. Indigenous Chono nomads, Jesuit missionaries and Spanish explorers all used the river to cross the isthmus in colonial times.
