= José de Moraleda y Montero =

José de Moraleda
- Born: 1750; Pasajes San Pedro, Spain
- Died: 1810 (aged 59–60); Callao, Viceroyalty of Peru
- Military career
- Allegiance: Spain
- Branch: Navy of Spain
- Commands: Moraleda Expedition

Signature
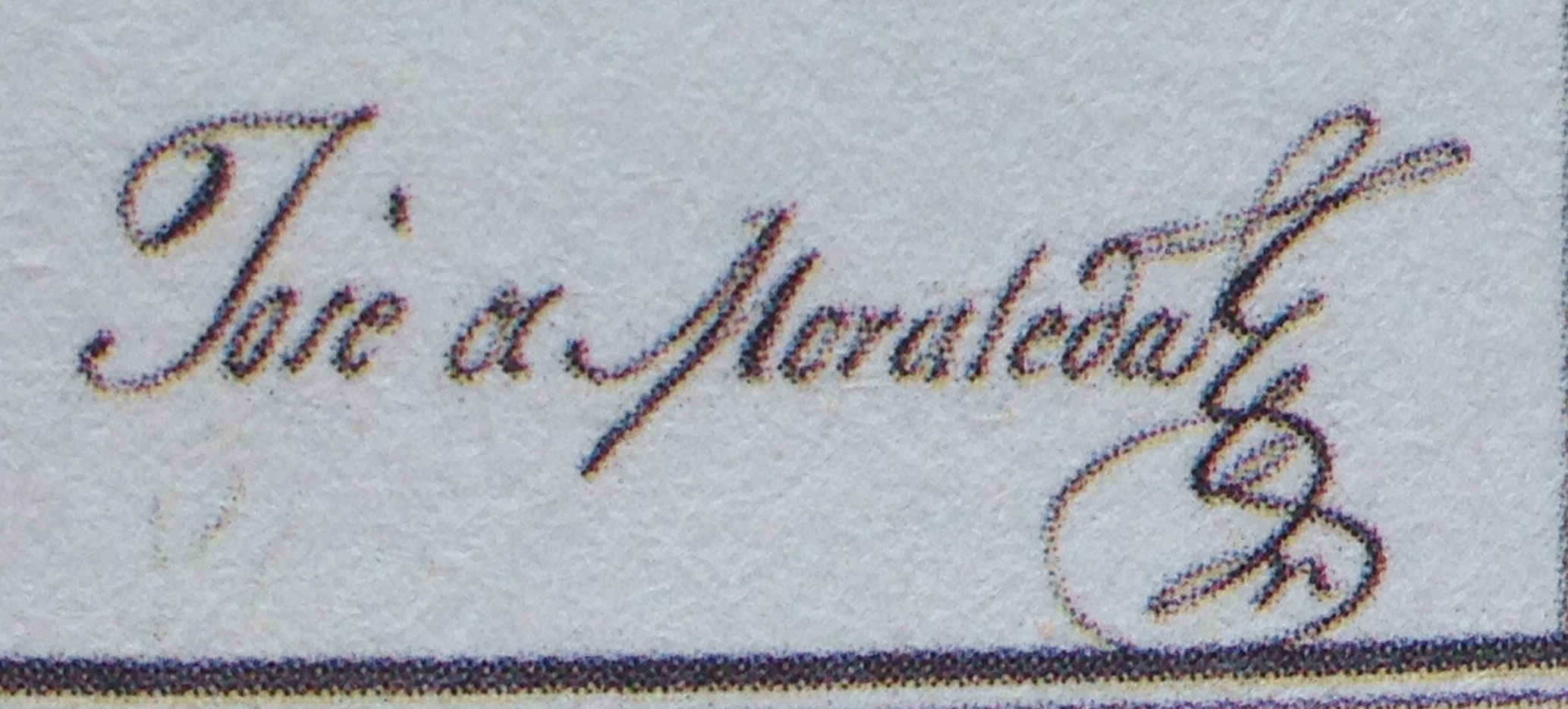

José Manuel de Moraleda y Montero (1750 - 1810) was a Spanish naval officer and cartographer known for his explorations of Chiloé and the archipelagos of Patagonia in the late 18th century. During his lifetime he gained a reputation of sorcerer in Chiloé and is remembered so in local folklore. The first-order waterway of Moraleda Channel is named after him.

== Biography ==
He was born in 1750 in Pasajes San Pedro in the Spanish Basque country, he was son of navy officer Manuel de Moraleda, and grew up in a family related to maritime activities. At young age José Moraleda attended naval courses at Real Escuela de Navegación in Cádiz, which later led him to work as naval officer in Spain's American possessions. Moraleda arrived to Chiloé Archipelago in 1786 being commissioned by Viceroy of Peru Teodoro de Croix to help local intendant Francisco Hurtado del Pino in making accurate maps of the archipelago.

The Patagonian maps of José de Moraleda are the first known improvement in Spanish cartography of western Patagonia since the Antonio de Vea expedition of 1675–1676.

In 1804 he obtained the grade of "teniente de navío", the highest of one of his category.

Moraleda died in the port of El Callao in 1810 in the Viceroyalty of Peru at an age of 60 years.

== Legacy ==
Moraleda wrote and drew a series of diaries on navigation diaries, courses, maps, as well as varied commentaries on ethnography and coastal fortifications. These diaries are:

- Viage al puerto del Callao o de Lima, en la urca afragatada del Rey, del porte de 40 cañones, nombrada Nuestra Señora de Monserrat, año de 1772
- Viage de reconocimiento de las Yslas de Chiloé. Año de 1786, que relata sus comisiones en el archipiélago entre 1786 y 1790
- Diario de la navegación desde el puerto de Callao de Lima al de San Carlos de Chiloé y de este al reconocimiento del Archipiélago de los Chonos y costa occidental patagónica comprendida entre los 41 y 46 grados de latitud meridional. Entre los años 1792 y 1796.
- Diarios de los viages desde el puerto del Callao a los de Guayaquil y Panamá, y de estos al reconocimiento y demarcación de las costas de Veragua, Rica, Nicaragua y Guatemala, entre 1803 y 1804 en la costa de América Central.

These works were partly edited by Diego Barros Arana in 1888 as "Esploraciones jeográficas e hidrográficas de José de Moraleda i Montero". Between 1887 and 1888 these works were edited again, this time in two volumes in the Chilean Navy's "anuarios hidrográficos" by Francisco Vidal Gormaz.

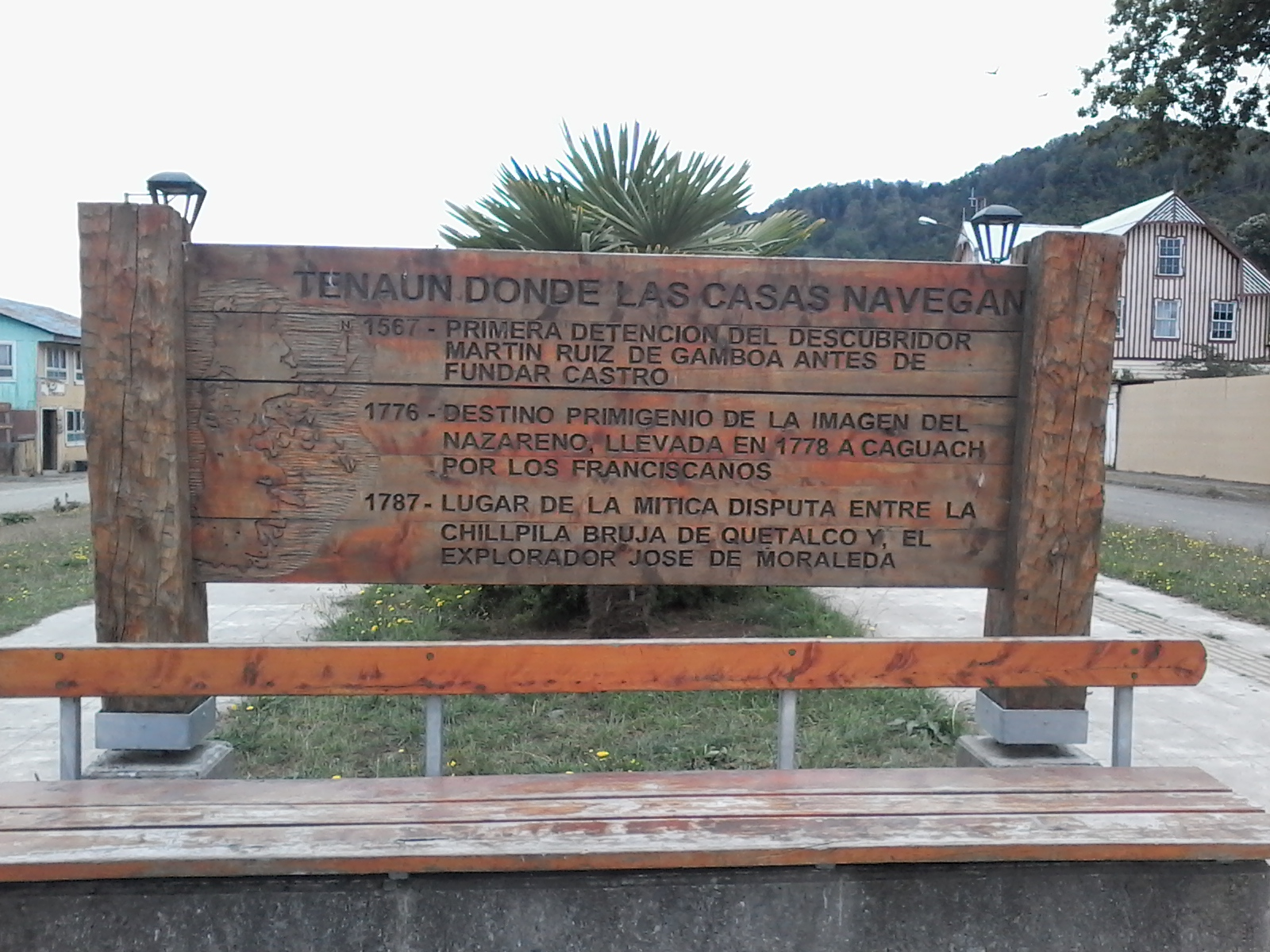
Signboard with historical highlights of the town of Tenaún mentioning the witch Chillpilla and José de Moraleda.

El Moraleda Channel (Canal Moraleda) in Aysén Region in Chile is named after him, honoring his explorations in the late 18th century. Moraledas's works as well as professional qualities are praised by Alessandro Malaspina in his extensive letter to the Spanish interior minister Antonio Valdés.

Moraleda is the subject of Hugo O'Donell's book El viaje a Chiloé de José de Moraleda (1787-1790) which was published in 1990 in Madrid. Twenty years later he was the subject of an essay named Moraleda, explorador del Pacífico insular in a publication of Untzi Museoa-Museo Naval of Donostia.

== Legend of Moraleda as sorcerer ==
In the oral traditions of Chiloé Archipelago Moraleda is attributed mythical characteristics. He is alleged to have had a magical skills competition with the Huilliche witch Chillpila in which she made Moraleda's ship run aground. She would then have received in exchange a book on European witchcraft by Moraleda. There is no trace of this supposed duel in Moraledas writings, but he did notice that local witches and sorcerers considered him "more machi, fortune teller, or sorcerer than all of them" ("más machi, adivino o brujo que todos ellos"). The mythical encounter with Chillpila would have occurred in 1786 and served later as founding myth for the secret Huilliche society of La Mayoría or Recta Provincia.
