= Dalca =

Type of canoe

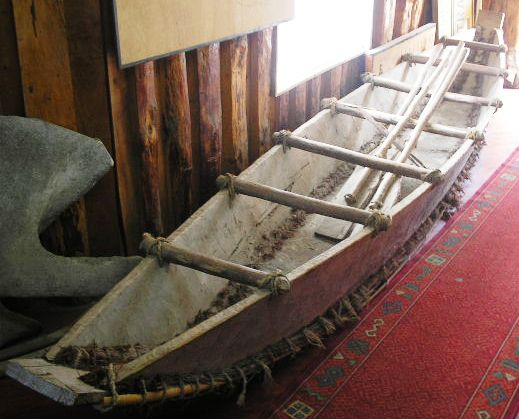
Reconstruction of a dalca in the museum of Dalcahue.

The dalca or piragua is a type of canoe employed by the Chonos, a nomadic indigenous people of southern Chile, and Huilliche people living in Chiloé archipelago. It was a light boat and ideal for navigating local waterways, including between islands of the Chiloé Archipelago, through the Chacao Channel to mainland Chile, and along the coast of the Gulf of Penas. Spanish chronicles called it best-suited for those waters, far superior to ships of the conquistadores.

The dalca was essential for many activities in Chiloé Archipelago including the logging of alerce wood, the Circular Mission system, and the various expeditions to Nahuel Huapi Lake and the channels of Patagonia. By 1886 dalcas had been replaced by other boat types and were no longer in use in Chiloé.

According to archaeologist José Miguel Ramírez, only full non-reconstructed dalcas remaining were collected by Swedish explorer Carl Skottsberg and are at the Museum of Ethnography, Stockholm and the Museum of World Culture, Gothenburg.

== See also ==
- Antonio de Vea expedition
- Maritime history of Chile
- Periagua
