= Gulf of San Esteban =

Embayment in Chile

Coordinates: 46.942977°S 74.219955°W

Map of the Gulf of San Esteban in the Isthmus of Ofqui area. In red a 20th-century canal project.

The Gulf of San Esteban (Spanish: Golfo de San Esteban) is an embayment in Aysén Region in the Chilean part of Patagonia. The gulf forms a northeastern subembayment of the larger Gulf of Penas and to the northwest it bounds the Bay of San Quintín. The Gulf of San Esteban lies southwest of Forelius Peninsula (part of the larger Taitao Peninsula), southwest of Isthmus of Ofqui and north of San Javier Island.
