= Circular Mission =

Jesuit mission system in South America

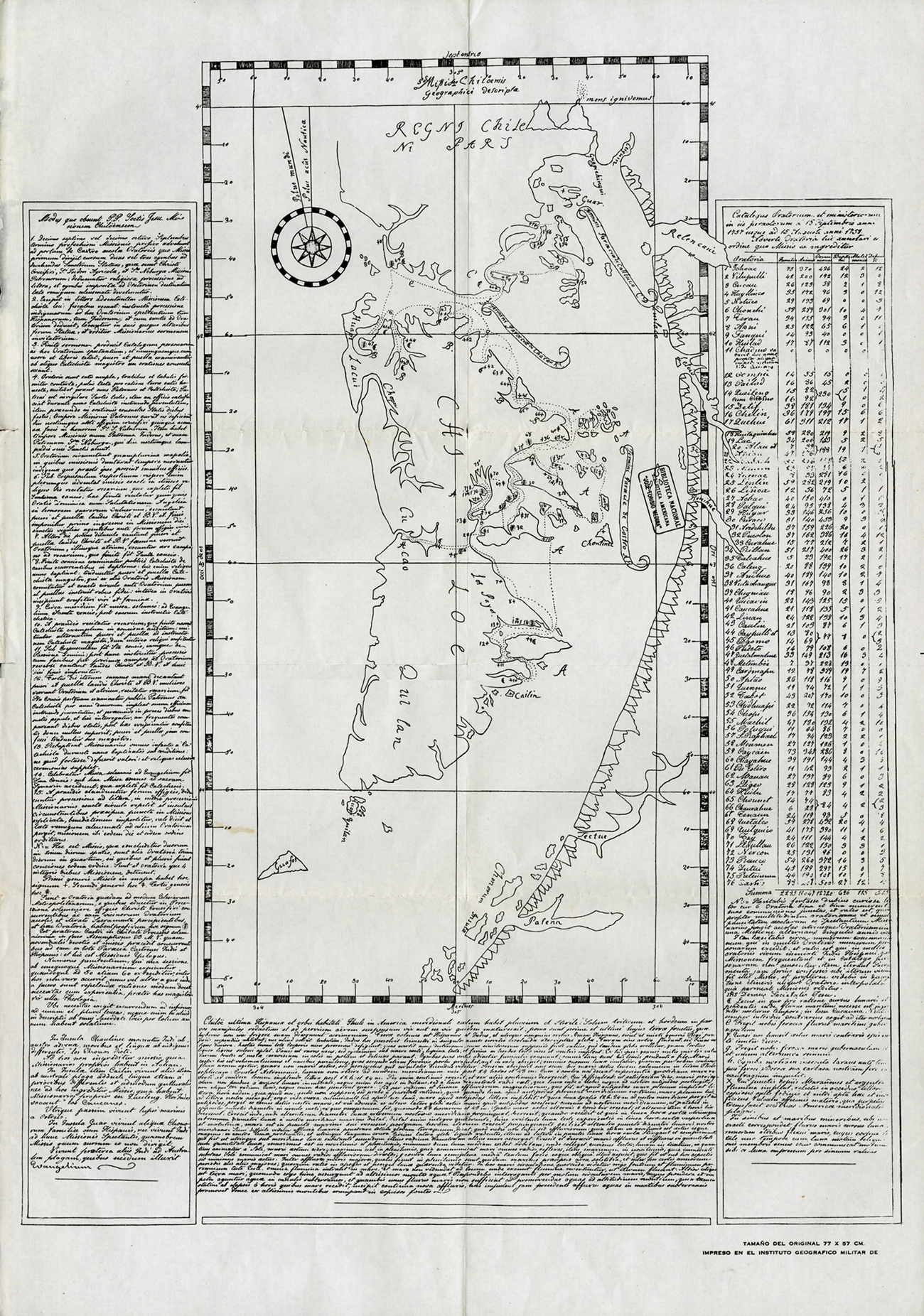
Map of the Circular Mission, 1751.

The Circular Mission (Spanish: Misión circular) was a system of missions established by the Society of Jesus in Chiloé Archipelago. It began as an experimental mission in 1608 when various places populated by Huilliches and Spaniards in the archipelago were visited in a series of voyages during spring and summer. At each stop the Jesuits usually preached for three days before continuing the journey to the next stop. In 1617 the mission was formalized as permanent but continued to be carried out as a series of visits to populated places returning every year to the same locations. During winter the Jesuit missionaries stayed in Castro. The Jesuits are reported to have established 77 chapels by 1755.

== See also ==
- Cristóbal Talcapillán
- Huilliche uprising of 1712
- Mission of Nahuel Huapi
- Mission of Río Bueno
