= Chacao, Chile =

Chacao
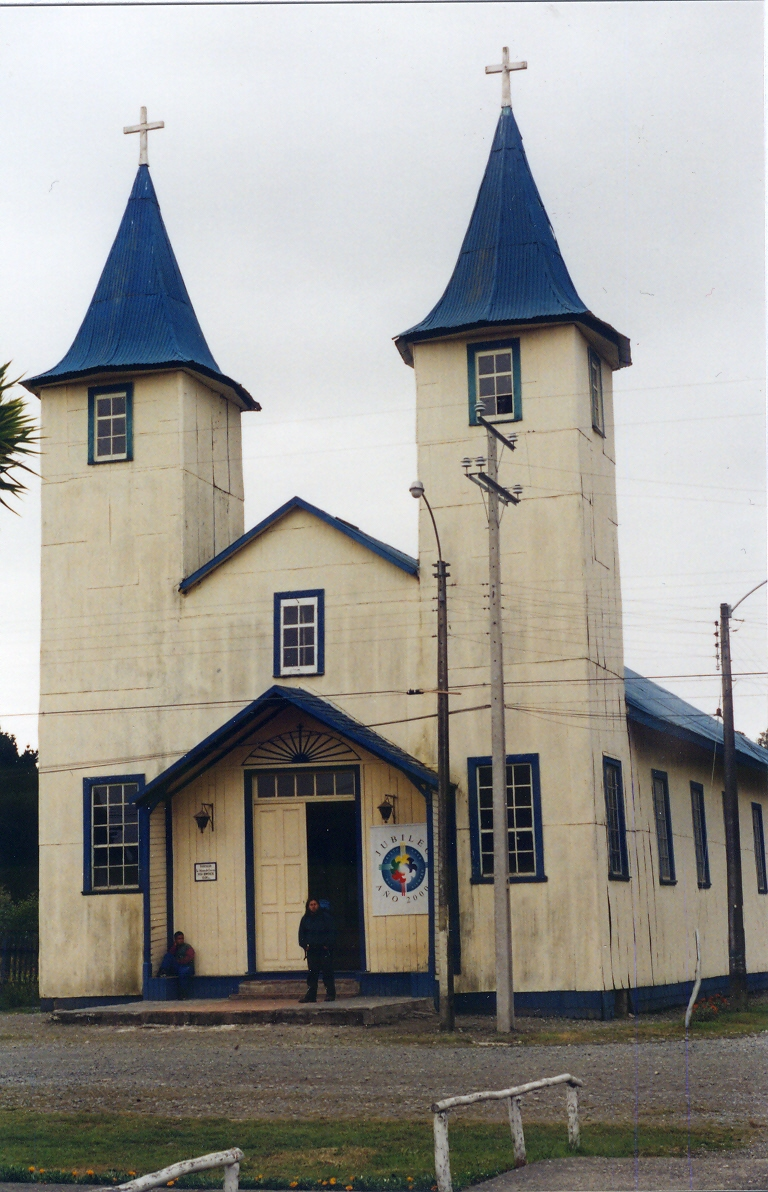
- Chacao
- Interactive map of Chacao
- Coordinates: 41.827758°S 73.5253°W
- Region: Los Lagos
- Province: Chiloé
- Municipality: Ancud
- Commune: Ancud
- Established: 1567

Government
  - Type: Municipal

Population (2002)
  - Total: 450
- Time zone: UTC−04:00 (Chilean Standard)
  - Summer (DST): UTC−03:00 (Chilean Daylight)
- Area code: Country + town = 56 + 65

Chacao is a village (Spanish: aldea) located at southern shore of Chacao Channel that separates Chiloé Island from the mainland. Chacao was established as a Spanish outpost with the name of San Antonio de Chacao in 1567 during the conquest of Chiloé.
