= Antonio de Vea =

Spanish sailor

Antonio de Vea was a Spanish sailor best known for leading the Antonio de Vea expedition to the fjords and channels of Patagonia in 1675 and 1676. The map of the archipelagoes of southern Chile made by Antonio de Vea was a milestone in local cartography. As far as it is known no new Spanish maps were made of the west coast of Patagonia until José de Moraleda y Montero's explorations in the late 18th century.

He was born in a family of noble origin in Milagro, Kingdom of Navarre. He had a military career in Portugal, Catalonia and the Spanish Netherlands.
