= Isthmus of Ofqui =

Isthmus that connects the Taitao Peninsula with the Chilean mainland

Coordinates: 46°47′50″S 74°04′04″W

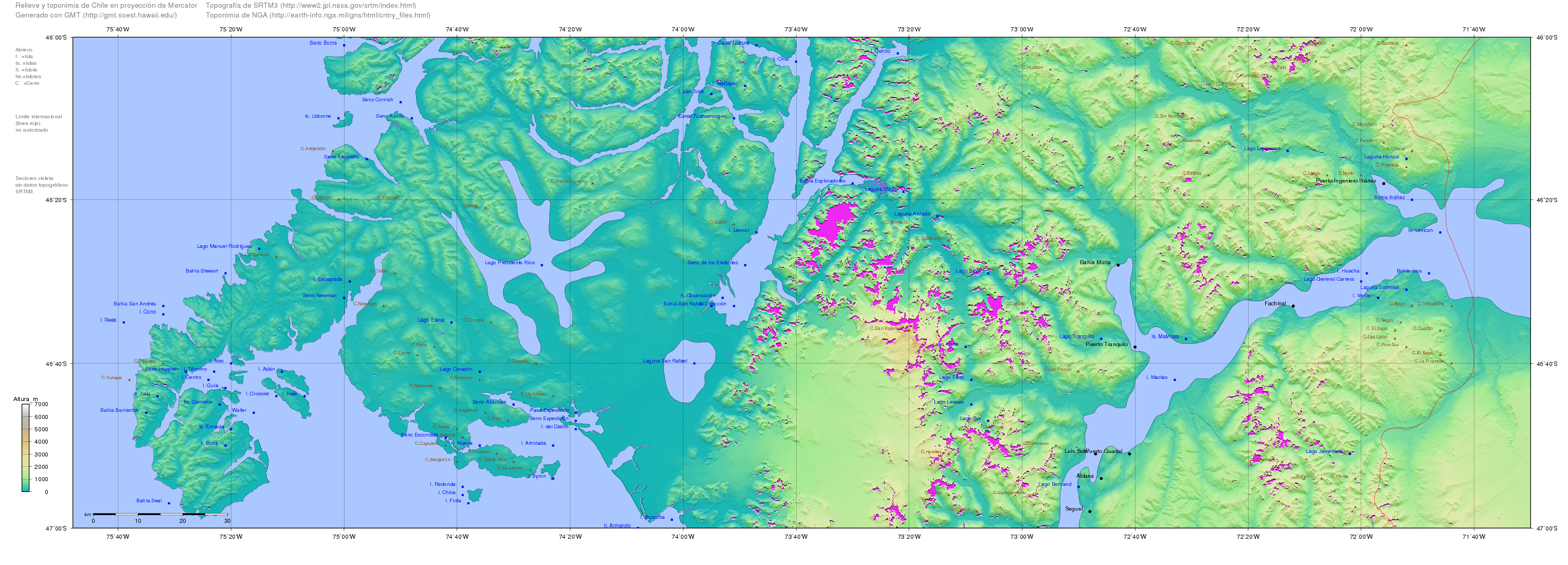
Península de Taitao: This SRTM inaccurate map doesn't show the connection between the Laguna San Rafael and the Estero Elefantes.

The Isthmus of Ofqui is a narrow isthmus that connects the Taitao Peninsula with the Chilean mainland. The isthmus is bounded in the south by the Gulf of Penas, in the north by the San Rafael Lagoon, in the west by the Taitao Peninsula and in the east by the Northern Patagonia Ice Field.

Much of the swampy isthmus is drained by San Tadeo River that flows in SSW direction to the Gulf of San Esteban.

Geologically it is considered the southern end of the Chilean Central Valley, and the Liquiñe-Ofqui Fault. The Isthmus of Ofqui lies close to the Chile Triple Junction where the Nazca Plate, the South American Plate, and the Antarctic Plate meet.

== The Isthmus of Ofqui canal construction project ==
The Negro River flows from near the San Rafael Laguna to the Gulf of San Esteban

In 1937 the Chilean Government ordered the construction of a canal through the isthmus in order to open a direct passage from the Moraleda Channel to the Messier Channel and avoid going out into the open Pacific Ocean to get around the Taitao Peninsula:

1. a 2,200 m long, 17 m wide, 5 m depth Canal between the Laguna San Rafael and the Negro River to connect then the
2. Negro River (25 km).

The work began in 1937 under the management of the railways department of the Ministry of Public Works. Work continued until May 1943 when funds ran out.

== See also ==
- Laguna San Rafael National Park
- Liquiñe
