= Chono people =

Indigenous people of the southwestern coast of Chile

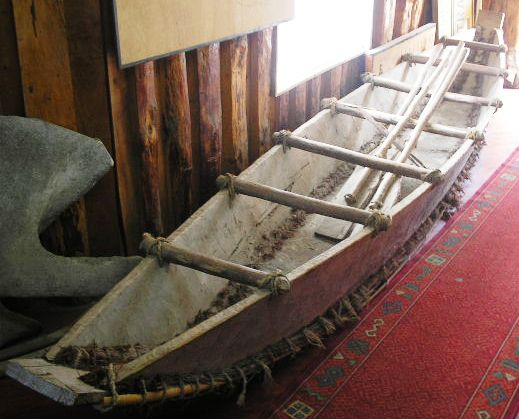
- Reconstruction of a dalca, the boat used by the Chono people

Total population
- extinct

Regions with significant populations
- Chile: Chiloé Archipelago

Languages
- Chono language?

Religion
- Traditional tribal religion, converts to Catholicism eventually assimilated in Chiloé and Calbuco

Related ethnic groups
- Payos? Kawésqar?

The Chono, or Guaiteco were a nomadic Indigenous people or group of peoples of the archipelagos of Chiloé, Guaitecas and Chonos.

The Chono people lived as hunter-gatherers travelling by canoe.

Much of what is known from Spanish sources on Chonos is filtered by a Huilliche worldview, as Huilliches and Huilliche language was used to communicate with Chonos.

== Physical appearance ==
Together with other canoe-faring peoples of western Patagonia, the Chono people shared the physical features of being of low stature, being long-headed (dolichocephalic) and having a "low face". In the opinion of Robert FitzRoy who saw the Chono people in the 1830s, they were more muscular and with a more beautiful appearance when compared to canoe-farers further south. Alberto Achacaz Walakial, himself a Kawésqar born around 1929, said that the Chono people were taller and of darker skin than his people. He also added that their noses and faces were longer.

Study of Chono bones reveal they were prone to suffer joint problems, infectious diseases and in some cases traumatic injuries. These diseases were associated with their lifestyle.

== History ==
Approximate extent of indigenous cultures in Chile at the time of the arrival of the Spanish. Picunche, Mapuche, Huilliche and Cunco are all part of the Mapuche macro-ethnic group.

=== Pre-Hispanic era ===
Scholar Alberto Trivera considers that there is no continuity between the human culture seen in the archaeological site of Monte Verde and any historical group. According to archaeologist Ricardo E. Latcham the Chono people along other sea-faring nomads may be remnants from more widespread indigenous groups that were pushed south by "successive invasions" from more northern tribes.

The Chono people are believed to be Chiloé Archipelago's first ethnically identifiable inhabitants. This has led to the assumption that the Chono were the people who left behind most of the abundant shell middens (Spanish: conchales) of Chiloé Archipelago, yet this claim is unverified. There are various place names in Chiloé Archipelago with Chono etymologies despite the main indigenous language of the archipelago at the arrival of the Spaniards being Veliche. A theory postulated by chronicler José Pérez García holds the Cuncos settled in Chiloé Island in pre-Hispanic times as a consequence of a push from more northern Huilliches who in turn were being displaced by the Mapuche. As such, some historians consider that places as far north as the coast of Osorno and Llanquihue Lake were once within the range of Chono nomadism.

Archaeologist and ethnographer Ricardo E. Latcham built upon these notions and held the Chono arrived to Guaitecas Archipelago from Chiloé Archipelago after these were invaded by groups of Mapuche culture (Huilliche, Cuncos, etc.) from the mainland in the 13th century.

=== Colonial era ===
The Chono people met Europeans for the first time when the naval expedition of Francisco de Ulloa arrived at their lands in 1553.

In the late 16th-century and early 17th-century there were various Spanish incursions aimed to bring Chono to the Spanish dominions of Chiloé. These incursions turned into outright slave raids following the 1608 decree of King Philip III of Spain that legalized slavery of "indigenous rebels". This was an abuse of the law since the Chono, in contrast to the Mapuche who had destroyed seven Spanish cities in their 1598–1604 uprising, had never rebelled. The Chono people were not the only ones to suffer from the slave raids organized by the Spanish from Chiloé; so did also the Huilliche of Valdivia, Osorno, and indigenous groups from Nahuel Huapi Lake across the Andes. Some Chono slaves may have been exported north to the Spanish settlements of Central Chile which was becoming a melting pot for uprooted indigenous peoples. The Spanish not only obtained the Chono people as slaves during raids but also from other Chono people who sold their own people. While some Chono people were turned into outright slaves, others ended up in the encomienda system of servitude.

Spanish interest in the lands of the Chono appear to have declined after the 1675 Antonio de Vea expedition. Nevertheless, in 1710 a large group of Chono arrived voluntarily at the Spanish settlement of Calbuco escaping from internal conflicts. The Spaniards decided to settle this group in Guar Island.

Interest in the Chono lands arose again in the 1740s when the Spaniards learned about the wreck of the British warship HMS Wager on Wager Island in western Patagonia. As a result of a corsair and pirate menace the Spanish authorities were ordered to depopulate the archipelagos of Chono and Guaiteca to deprive their enemies of any eventual support from the native populations. This then led to the transfer of population to Chiloé Archipelago in the north while some Chono moved south of Taitao Peninsula, effectively depopulating the territory. The Chono in Chiloé ended up being absorbed by the mestizo and indigenous Huilliche population there.

Chono served as maritime pilots in many of the expeditions undertaken by the Spaniards to the Patagonian archipelagoes. Yet it was noted by some Spaniards like José de Moraleda y Montero that the Chono did not always tell the truth and sometimes misled the navigators. Indeed, the Chono managed to keep Spanish explorers away from Presidente Ríos Lake so effectively that it became officially known to Chileans only in 1945. (Note: The lake was however already known to seafarers from Chiloé.)

As a consequence of their proximity to the Spanish settlements in Chiloé, the Chono were the canoe-faring peoples of Patagonia with the most intense contact with the Spaniards. Anecdotal evidence shows that the Chono became increasingly acculturated into Spanish culture over the 17th and 18th centuries. For example, Cristóbal Talcapillán, who was interviewed by the Spanish authorities in the 1670s, understood the difference between the Spaniards and the English. In the 1740s Martín Olleta was able to understand the importance of the wreckage of HMS Wager and profited from it by handing over the survivors to the Spanish authorities while keeping valuable metal objects obtained from the wreck. The proficiency in Spanish of the Chono led by Martín Olleta was good enough to communicate with the Spanish-speaking surgeon of the British party.

=== Demise ===
The Chono largely disappear from the historical record after the 18th century, but sporadic references remained. Thomas Bridges reported having met Chonos in the late 19th century. Alberto Achacaz Walakial, himself a Kawésqar born around 1929, claimed to have met Chonos when young. Writer Benjamín Subercaseaux visited Taitao Peninsula in 1946 reporting having seen footsteps and fresh human feces he thought indicated that nomadic Chono, as known from the historical record, still existed. Ricardo Vásquez led an expedition in 2006 to remote parts of Taitao Peninsula partly motivated by possible indications that Chono were still living in isolation there.

In 1743, members of the cabildo of Castro explained the decline of the Chono that had settled in Jesuit missions as caused by a shortage of women. Historian Rodolfo Urbina Burgos follows up on this thought and argues the Chono as a whole went extinct as a distinctive group because of a chronic shortage of women. Urbina Burgos argues this meant Chono were being married to indigenous women of Veliche, Caucahué, or Payo stock. Thus the Chono miscegenated and assimilated into the indigenous cultures of Chiloé by replacement of women. Chono women were responsible for diving in cold waters for shellfish, and this may have been the cause of a short life expectancy among them. Chonos who fled south of Taitao Peninsula in the 18th century may have ended up being absorbed into the Kawésqar. (Note: Charles Darwin, who visited the Chono and Guaitecas archipelagoes in the 1830s, thought that the islands lacked populations because "Catholics" had turned Indians into "Catholics and slaves".)

Inhabitants in the island of Laitec, which has strong historical links to the Chono, have an indigenous genetic admixture averaging 80%. It is not known to which extent miscegenated descendants of Chono on this island retain aspects of Chono culture. The custom of the inhabitants of Melinka to bring dogs on board in their travels may be rooted in Chono traditions.

== Culture ==
Culturally, the Chono had much in common with southern sea-farers such as the Kawésqar, yet the Chono also had influences from the Mapuche world. Authors such as Harb D. et al. (1998) list the Chono people as culturally "Fuegian" in contrast to more northern Mapuche groups. Urbina Burgos (2007) mentions the Chiloé Archipelago as the frontier between Mapuche culture and the culture of the "southern peoples".

The putative Chono language is known only from local toponyms and from an untranslated catechism.

Men hunted marine mammals, especially sea lions, while women gathered shellfish and seaweed. The Chono used nets and spears to gather food from the sea, but supplemented their catch with potatoes and other plants from small gardens. Their healing places consisted of caves or leather structures.

The Chono had small dows they used to travel with in their dalcas. Some evidence suggest the dogs were used for fishing, and were not themselves a source of food in the Chono diet.

Both the Chono people and Kawésqars used Pilgerodendron uviferum for firewood, as well as wood for oars, paddles, boats and houses.

Isotope studies of human bones found in former Chono territory suggest the Chonos maintained a chiefly marine-based diet over centuries or millennia until after the time of Spanish contact (c. 1550), when land-based food became more important in the Chono diet.

Iron objects were highly valued by the Chono and were usually obtained from the Spanish settlements in Chiloé, either by trade or theft. In some cases, iron was scavenged from European shipwrecks.

== Bibliography ==
- Alcamán, Eugenio (1997). "Los mapuche-huilliche del Futahuillimapu septentrional: Expansión colonial, guerras internas y alianzas políticas (1750-1792)" (PDF). Revista de Historia Indígena (in Spanish) (2): 29–76. Archived from the original (PDF) on 2013-12-28.
- The Oldest Americans, George Weber, May 6, 2007.
- Cárdenas A., Renato; Montiel Vera, Dante; Grace Hall, Catherine (1991). Los chono y los veliche de Chiloé (PDF) (in Spanish). Santiago de Chile: Olimpho.
- Trivero Rivera, Alberto (2005). Los primeros pobladores de Chiloé: Génesis del horizonte mapuche (in Spanish). Ñuque Mapuförlaget. ISBN 91-89629-28-0.
- Urbina Burgos, Rodolfo (2007). "El pueblo chono: de vagabundo y pagano a cristiano y sedentario mestizado" (PDF). Orbis incognitvs: avisos y legados del Nuevo Mundo (in Spanish). Huelva: Universidad de Huelva. pp. 325–346. ISBN 9788496826243.
