= Calbuco (disambiguation) =

Calbuco is a city and commune in Llanquihue Province, Chile.

Calbuco may also refer to:

In Los Lagos Region, Chile:

- Calbuco Department, Chiloé, a department of Chiloé from 1834 to 1855
- Calbuco Department, Llanquihue, a department of Llanquihue from 1937 to 1975
- Calbuco Archipelago
  - Calbuco Island, an island in the commune of Calbuco, containing the city Calbuco
    - Fort Calbuco
- Calbuco Channel, a channel separating Calbuco Island from mainland
- Calbuco River (Llanquihue), a river in the commune of Puerto Varas
- Calbuco (volcano), a volcano in the commune of Puerto Montt

In other parts of Chile:

- Calbuco River (Cautín), a river in Cautín Province, Araucanía Region
- Estero Calbuco, a creek in the commune of Mulchén, Biobío Province, Bío-Bío Region
