= Intendancy of Chiloé =

Intendancy of the Spanish Empire

Intendencia de Chiloé
- Intendancy of Spanish Empire
- 1784–1789
- Navy and coastal fortifications' flag
- Capital: San Carlos de Chiloé
- Government
- Governor Intendant
  - 1784–1789: F. Hurtado del Pino
  - 1788–1791 (interim): Col. Francisco Garos
- History
  - Established: 1784
  - Disestablished: 1789
- Subdivisions
  - Type: Curates
Preceded by	Succeeded by
Governorate of Chiloé	Governorate of Chiloé

The Intendancy of Chiloé (Intendencia de Chiloé), was an ephemeral administrative division of the Spanish Empire that existed in Chiloé Archipelago, then part of the Captaincy General of Chile, itself part of the Viceroyalty of Peru, between 1784 and 1789.

== History ==
With the Bourbon Reforms during the 18th century, intendiancies were created, governed by a governor. These were divided into partidos governed by subdelegates. Chiloé was the first intendancy established in the Kingdom of Chile when King Charles III designated the military engineer and infantry lieutenant colonel Francisco Hurtado del Pino as his governor intendant by royal title on May 19, 1784. On May 20, May 19 Hurtado received particular instructions in another royal title where Chiloé was mentioned as "a possession as interesting to his crown as it was estimable and coveted by his enemies," and he was charged with dedicating "all his efforts and the greatest efforts to defend and preserve it."

Hurtado arrived in San Carlos de Chiloé on December 17, 1786 together with Francisco Machado, whom Viceroy Teodoro de Croix commissioned to help Hurtado prepare a general charter of Chiloé as ordered by royal order.

Complying with the eighth of the royal instructions received, in 1785 the governor-intendant Hurtado had the General Register of the Province of Chiloé drawn up, in which he compiled census information on the population subject to his obedience in the intendant's office. The censused territory was divided into three curates, which in turn were divided into districts, and into chapels (capillas) or towns:

- Curate of Chacao: 3,107 Spaniards and 1,474 Indians. Included the partidos of Chacao and Pudeto, themselves divided into 17 chapels, including the territory of Carelmapu and Maullín, assigned to the partido of Chacao.
- Curate of Calbuco: 1,934 Spaniards and 1,403 Indians. Included the partido of Calbuco, itself divided into 14 chapels.
- Curate of Castro: 10,035 Spaniards and 8,750 Indians. Included the partidos of Castro (11 chapels), Chonchi (5 chapels), Puqueldón (6 chapels), Queilén (8 chapels), Achao (8 chapels), Meulín (5 chapels) and Tenaún (8 chapels).

The parties mentioned in the registry correspond to rural pagos according to the terminology used before the application of the intendant's ordinance, since due to the prevailing poverty the Chiloé intendant's office did not have partisan subdelegates at the head of the parties or subdelegations such as the created in other intendancies.

For a better understanding of his results, Hurtado commissioned the creation of a map of the province indicating its areas of effective settlement. The creation of this map is attributed to the Spanish pilot José de Moraleda y Montero, who was in the area during the census. Moraleda, after the census, made two circumnavigation trips around Chiloé Island between 1787 and 1788, describing its coasts, in addition to the coasts of Carelmapu and Calbuco, preparing the map. In the annex to this map the limits of the intendant's office are indicated, which, being known by the governor intendant, having been studied by royal order prior to his trip to the island, the reports and background of the Chiloé government are not explicitly indicated in the royal title of May 19, 1784 that created it.

Most of this territory was not under effective control of the Spanish Empire, partly because it was still in the power of the indigenous peoples of the area and partly because it was completely uninhabited. Outside the Chiloé islands, there were Spanish settlements in the Calbuco archipelago and in Carelmapu. In a royal order of May 31, 1784, the king ordered Hurtado and the governor of Valdivia to each begin the works of the Camino Real between Carelmapu and Valdivia, passing through the ruins of Osorno, with the Bueno River being the recognized limit. by both jurisdictions. Although both rulers did not agree on the route of the road, in March 1787 Hurtado sent an expedition that reached Llanquihue Lake and in April returned to Maullín. Shortly afterward he sent another expedition in search of the ruins of Osorno. He also commissioned works to rebuild the forts of Agüi, Calbuco, Carelmapu and Castro.

Due to his training in engineering, Hurtado was commissioned to prepare reports on the economic and military situation of the archipelago, where in the first stage he expressed himself in favor of the union of Chiloé with Peru over his old link with Chile. However, in a second stage he began to perceive that dependence on the viceroyalty hindered his administration, and that the best way to govern Chiloé was to convert it into a general captaincy that dealt directly with the Council of the Indies in Spain. These differences with the viceroy Teodoro de Croix ended up causing his dismissal in 1789, as well as the abolition of the intendancy, which from then on would once again be converted into a military governorate, with governors trusted by the viceroy. Croix in his relationship to his successor referred to the dispute:

[...] this Royal Court received a letter from that Intendant in which he included a document for the Superior Board. In the letter he says, among other things, that I and my Advisor invaded it, that we intercepted the steps of its jurisdiction, that the Island of Chiloé is not subject to this Captaincy General nor to that of Chile, that according to its title, and instruction that was given, Intendant's Ordinances and subsequent orders that have been addressed to him, that Island is an indifferent overseas Province, which in its Government depends only on His Majesty and the reserved path [...] Intendant Hurtado is in this capital destined to be sent to Spain accompanied by his cause, by Royal Order of May 10, 1789, for the insubordination and excesses committed in his Government and Municipality of the Island of Chiloé [...]

Viceroy Croix temporarily appointed Colonel Francisco Garos as governor-intendant to replace Hurtado, whom he ordered to travel to Lima to defend himself from his prosecution. The Balbanera frigate that was transporting Garos was shipwrecked in the shoals of the port of San Carlos on December 22, 1788, but Garos managed to save himself and Hurtado handed over the government to him. Garos remained until the end of 1791 when Pedro Cañaveral y Ponce arrived, appointed by the king on June 24, 1789 as political and military governor without the rank of intendant. Chiloé continued its dependence on the Viceroyalty of Peru until its disappearance in 1824 and as an isolated military governorate until its annexation to Chile in 1826.

== See also ==
- Captaincy General of Chile
- Viceroyalty of Peru
