= Governorate of Chiloé =

Political and military subdivision of the Spanish Empire

Governorate of Chiloe Gobernación de Chiloé (Spanish)
- 1567–1784; 1789–1868
- Flag

- Chiloé with its de jure borders. The east appears as disputed as there coexist contradictory documents.
- Status: Governorate of the Viceroyalty of Peru
- Capital: Castro (1567-1768); San Carlos de Chiloé (1768-1868)
- Common languages: Spanish, Mapudungun
- Religion: Roman Catholicism
- Monarch
  - 1567–1621: Philip III
  - 1833–1868: Isabella II
- Governor
  - 1567-1568: Martín Ruiz de Gamboa
  - 1817–1868: Antonio de Quintanilla
- Historical era: Spanish Empire
  - Established: 1567
  - Treaty of Tantauco: 1868
- Currency: Peso; Real de alerce
| Preceded by | Succeeded by |
| Viceroyalty of Peru | Conservative Republic |

The Governorate of Chiloé was political and military subdivision of the Spanish Empire that existed, with a 1784–1789 interregnum, from 1567 to 1868. The Governorate of Chiloé depended on the Captaincy General of Chile until the late 18th century when it was made dependent directly on the Viceroyalty of Peru. The administrative change was done simultaneously as the capital of the archipelago was moved from Castro to Ancud in 1768. The last Royal Governor of Chiloé, Antonio de Quintanilla, depended directly on the central government in Madrid.

== Extent ==
The Governorate of Chiloé had its de jure northern limit a Bueno River in continental Chile. There the governorate limited with the territories of Valdivia. The area de facto controlled included the Chiloé Archipelago, the seashore forts and settlements north of Chacao Channel plus the Mission of Nahuel Huapi which was nevertheless financed from Valdivia. Historian Gabriel Guarda do however disagree claiming the Mission of Nahuel Huapi was within the jurisdiction of Valdivia. The so-called juncos of Osorno (Huilliches) attempted in the late 18th century to have their lands, that lied just south of Bueno River, to be removed from the Governorate of Chiloé and incorporated to Valdivia. The reason of this was their bad relation and history of warfare with the settlements of around Chacao Channel.

The historian Isidoro Vázquez de Acuña argues that the territory of the settlements on the Atlantic Patagonian coast were under the jurisdiction of Chiloé. On August 13, 1793 Ambrosio O'Higgins sends an official letter to the Viceroy of Peru in which he states:

the diligence will always be very important, and will provide the reconnaissance of the heart of those lands, their products, inhabitants and communications, how to introduce those of our possessions on this side of Chiloé with those established or that may be established in Puerto Deseado, San Julián, and Bahía Sin Fondo, points that Your Excellency knows very well and knows it is convenient for us to occupy for the security of these domains and to prevent harmful attempts by foreigners.

At that time, maps and documents made by Spanish officials coexisted that were contradictory, with some placing the Andes mountain range as the eastern boundary of Chile and others on the Atlantic Ocean.

== Royal governors ==
All 17th century Royal Governors were named by the Royal Governor of Chile. In the 18th century this system changed and while still named by the Royal Governor of Chile the position were to be ratified by the King of Spain. Later in the 18th century the Viceroy of Peru took over the duties of naming governors but still with the need of ratification by the King of Spain. Formally the office was granted based on merits during all of the 17th century. However, in the early 18th century "pecuniary service" begun also to be considered, which meant in practice that the office could be purchased. This practice was abolished in 1750. The office of Governor of Chiloé was commonly used to booster a carrier and then access more desirable positions of power in Central Chile.

The position of Royal Governor of Chiloé dates to the early 17th century. Before that a succession of corregidores existed including Alonso Benítez and Alonso de Góngora Marmolejo. Antonio Mejía who was sent by Alonso de Ribera to rule Chiloé died in a shipwreck in 1603 while approaching the archipelago.

- Martín Ruiz de Gamboa (1567-1568)
- Francisco Hernández Ortiz-Pizarro (1601-1604)
- Andrés Herrera (1642–1643 †)
- Fernando de Alvarado (1643–1644)
- Ignacio Carrera Iturgoyen (c. 1650)
- Antonio Manríquez de Lara (1680s)
- Bartolomé Gallardo (1686-1688)
- José Marín de Velasco (1708–1712, 1715–1719)
- Blas de Vera Ponce y León
- Nicolás Salvo (1719–1724)
- Juan Dávila de Herzelles (1724–1728)
- Francisco José Sotomayor
- Bartolomé Carrillo
- Alonso Sánchez del Pozo
- Francisco Gutiérrez de Espejo (1740–1741)
- Victoriano Martínez de Tineo (1743–1748)
- Antonio Narciso de Santa María (1749–1761)
- Juan Antonio Garretón (1761–1765)
- Manuel Fernández de Castelblanco (1765–1768)
- Carlos de Beranger Dusonet (1768–1772)
- Juan Antonio Garretón (1772-1777)
- Antonio Martínez y La Espada (1777-1786)

The "notables" of Chiloé, represented by the local cabildo had a conflictive relation with governor Martínez y La Espada. The cabildo made complaints to the authorities in Lima. Between 1786 and 1789 the position of governor was abolished and replaced by an intendant. The sole intendant of this period was Francisco Hurtado del Pino.

- Francisco Garos (1789–1791)
- Pedro Cañaveral y Ponce (1791-1797)
- Juan Antonio Montes de la Puente (1797–1800)
- César Balviani (1800-1800)
- Antonio Álvarez y Jiménez (1800-1813)
- Ignacio María Justiz y Urrutia (1813-1817)
- Antonio de Quintanilla (1817-1868)

== Sources ==
- Barros Arana, Diego. "Capítulo XI". Historia general de Chile (in Spanish). Vol. Tomo cuarto (Digital edition based on the 2nd edition of 2000 ed.). Alicante: Biblioteca Virtual Miguel de Cervantes.
- Olguín, Carlos (1971). Instituciones Politicas Y Administrativas de Chiloe en El Siglo XVIII (in Spanish). Santiago, Chile: Editorial Jurídica de Chile.
- Menéndez, Francisco (1896). Viajes de Fray Francisco Menéndez a la cordillera (in Spanish) – via Wikisource.
