= Fernando de Alvarado =

Fernando de Alvarado was a Spanish encomendero and interim Governor of Chiloé in the 1640s. De Alvarado came originally from the city of San Mateo de Osorno in mainland Chile. With the fall of the city in 1603 de Alvarado followed many Spanish settlers and loyalist Indians and relocated to Chiloé Archipelago. As governor Andrés Herrera died in battle with the Dutch forces of Hendrik Brouwer in Carelmapu in 1643 de Alvarado became interim governor. De Alvardo organized the remaining troops in Carelmapu and Calbuco aiming to prevent an indigenous uprising and harass the Dutch invaders. He moved quickly through the forested paths that led south from Carelmapu and reached Castro before the Dutch did so. Amidst heavy rains de Alvarado ordered the city of Castro to be dismantled and the population to hide in the forests. He managed to assemble a force of no more than a hundred men. The Dutch were disappointed to find Castro completely dismantled, not even the wood shingle roofs were left in place. They left an inscription calling the Spanish cowards.

De Alvardo arranged for the fast assembly of a sailing vessel in southern Chiloé, which as soon as ready hastily sailed to Concepción to alarm the Spanish in mainland Chile.

== Bibliography ==
- Barros Arana, Diego. "Capítulo XI". Historia general de Chile (in Spanish). Vol. Tomo cuarto (Digital edition based on the 2nd edition of 2000 ed.). Alicante: Biblioteca Virtual Miguel de Cervantes.
