= Mission of Nahuel Huapi =

Religious mission in the kingdom of Chile, currently Argentina

The Mission of Nahuel Huapi was an intermittent Jesuit mission that existed in colonial times on the shores of Nahuel Huapi Lake, northern Patagonia. The exact locations of the missions are not known but it has been suggested, based on a Christian grave finding, that the mission of the early 18th century was located in Huemul Peninsula.

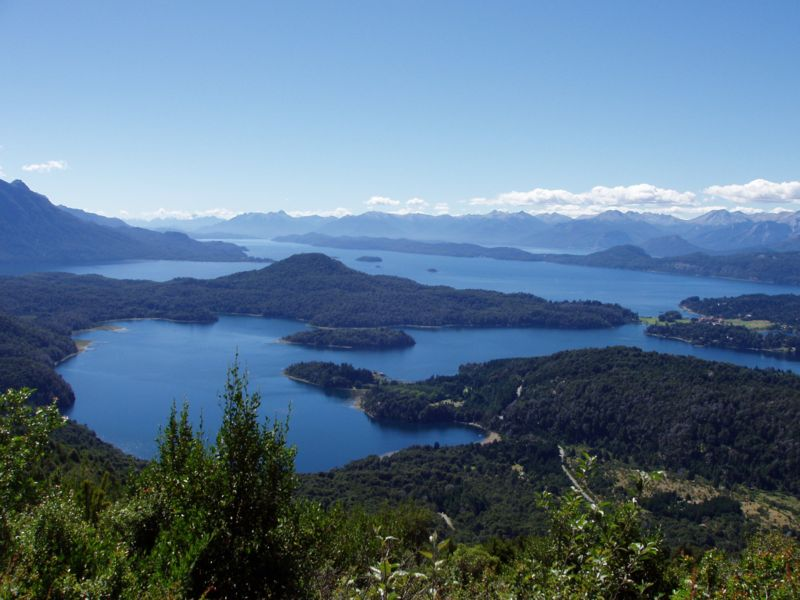
Nahuel Huapi Lake on whose shore the successive missions lay.

The Mission of Nahuel Huapi depended on administrative and religious matters on the Governorate of Chiloé but was nevertheless financed from the city of Valdivia. Historian Gabriel Guarda disagrees, claiming the mission was within the jurisdiction of Valdivia.

== History ==
=== Early explorations ===
Nahuel Huapi Lake was known to Spaniards since the times of the Conquest of Chile. In the summer of 1552–1553, the Governor of Chile Pedro de Valdivia sent Francisco de Villagra to explore the area east of the Andes at the latitudes of the city of Valdivia. Francisco de Villagra crossed the Andes through Mamuil Malal Pass and headed south until reaching Limay River in the vicinity of Nahuel Huapi Lake.

Another early Spaniard to visit the zone of Nahuel Huapi Lake was the Jesuit priest Diego de Rosales. He had been ordered to the area by the Governor of Chile Francisco Antonio de Acuña Cabrera y Bayona, who was concerned about the unrest of the native Puelche and Poya after the slave-hunting expeditions carried out by Luis Ponce de León in 1649, who captured Indians and sold them into slavery. Diego de Rosales started his journey at the ruins of Villarica in Chile, crossed the Andes through Mamuil Malal Pass, and traveled further south along the eastern Andean valleys, reaching Nahuel Huapi Lake in 1650.

=== The missions ===
In 1670 Jesuit father Nicolás Mascardi, based in Chiloé Archipelago, entered the area through the Reloncaví Estuary and Todos los Santos Lake to found a mission at the Nahuel Huapi Lake, which lasted until 1673.

A new mission at the shores of Nahuel Huapi Lake was established in 1703, backed financially from Potosí, thanks to orders from the viceroy of Peru. According to historic documents, the Poya of Nahuelhuapi requested the mission to be reestablished, apparently to forge an alliance with the Spaniards against the Puelche. Following the 1712 Huilliche rebellion in Chiloé Archipelago some insurgents sought refuge from the Spanish reprisals with Father Manuel del Hoyo in the mission. The mission was destroyed in 1717 by the Poya following their disagreement with the superior of the mission. He had refused to give them a cow. Soon thereafter authorities learned that four or five people travelling to Concepción had been killed by the Poya. The colonists assembled a punitive expedition in Calbuco and Chiloé. Composed of both Spaniards and indios reyunos, the expedition did not find any Poya.

Until the wreckage of HMS Wager in Guayaneco Archipelago in 1741, Jesuits clearly prioritized Nahuel Huapi Lake as an area to expand their missionary activity over the Patagonian islands south of Chiloé.

In 1766 the head of the Mission of Ralún tried to reestablish the mission at Nahuel Huapi, but the following year, the Crown suppressed the Society of Jesus, ordering them out of the colonies in the Americas. The Franciscans who replaced the Jesuits in Chiloé sought to rediscover the route across the Andes to Nahuel Huapi Lake in order to establish a mission there. For that purpose they organised expeditions in 1778 and in 1779 which however failed to reach the lake. The conflictive Intendant of Chiloé Francisco Hurtado del Pino accused the Franciscans in 1787 of not being interested in missioneering, wrongly claiming the route to Nahuel Huapi was known.

Although no new mission was established in Nahuel Huapi, Franciscans used Valdivia as starting point for the founding of a large network of missions, of which the Mission of Río Bueno (established in 1777) was the closest to Nahuel Huapi.

== See also ==
- List of Jesuit sites
