= Chaullin Island =

Chaullin Island may refer to:

- Chaullin Island (Calbuco)
- Chaullin Island (Chiloe)
