= Huar Island =

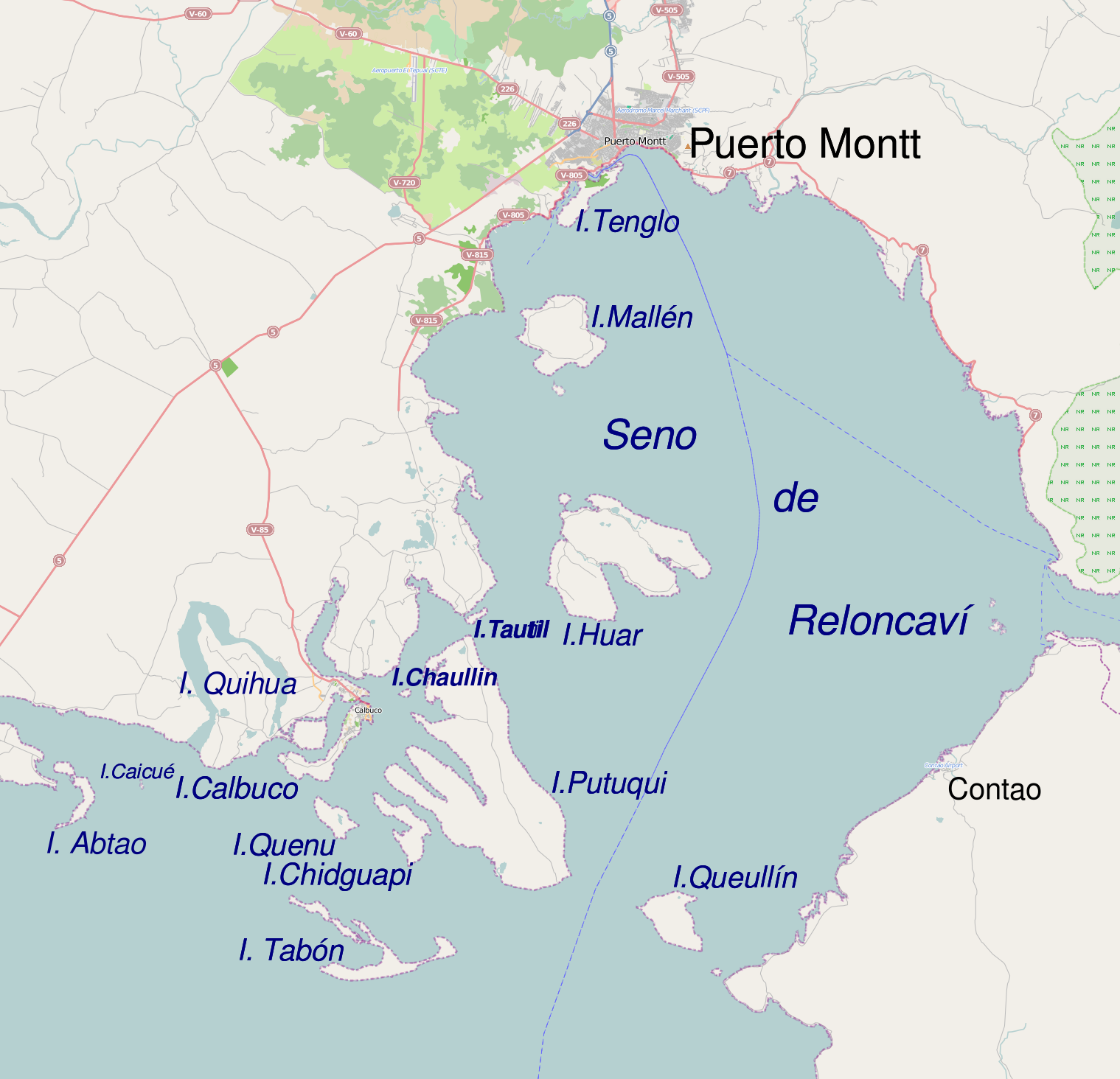
- Huar Island, in the middle of the Reloncaví Sound
- Interactive map of Huar Island

Geography
- Coordinates: 41.684277°S 72.951234°W
- Archipelago: Calbuco Archipelago

Administration
- Chile
- Region: Los Lagos
- Province: Llanquihue
- Commune: Calbuco

Demographics
- Population: ~1200 (Censo 2002)

Additional information
- NGA UFI -883816

Huar Island or Guar Island (Spanish: Isla Guar) is an island of Calbuco Archipelago located in the Reloncaví Sound. The island is located about 15 km (9 mi) northeast of Calbuco and 20 km (12 mi) south of Puerto Montt. There are 5 settlements in the island and 5 schools: Quetrolauquén, Alfaro, Nalcahue, Chucagua y Colhue. The island was one of the last places of the Chono people.

There is no electricity network on the island, but the 5 schools are connected with Internet.
