= José Marín de Velasco =

Royal Governor of Chiloé
- In office 1708–1712
- Monarch: Philip V of Spain
- Succeeded by: Blas de Vera Ponce y León

Royal Governor of Chiloé
- In office 1715 or 1716 – 1719
- Monarch: Philip V of Spain
- Succeeded by: Nicolás Salvo

Military service
- Allegiance: Spain
- Rank: Captain
- Unit: Caballos de Chacao

José Marín de Velasco was a Governor of Chiloé in the early 18th century. He was named Royal Governor of Chiloé by the King of Spain in 1708 by doing a monetary contribution—or in other words de facto purchasing the office.

== Conflict with Garzón and Huilliche rebellion ==
During his governance his authority was challenged by captain Alejandro Garzón Garaicochea who claimed he too was governor. Garzón presented a letter from the Royal Governor of Chile Juan Andrés de Ustariz to the cabildo of Castro where he was assigned governor in case of Marín's absence. Garzón interpreted that as he being the governor in Calbuco when Marín was in Chacao, and governor in Chacao when Marín was in Castro. Marín ordered Garzón to meet him at the fort of Chacao in 1712, if not his actions were to be considered treason towards the king. When Garzón did not compel with the order Marín gathered the cavalry of Chacao and requested the aid of the militia of Castro. Garzón chose to leave Calbuco with "all the soldiers of the fort and 40 indios reyunos" and travelled to Central Chile via the Nahuel Huapi route.

Local Huilliches took advantage of the conflicts among the Spaniards and the weakening of the forces caused by Garzón's departure and launched a considerable rebellion. Marín's with the aid of Spaniards and loyal Indians repressed rebellion.

== Suspension and restitution ==
Garzón accused Marín of triggering the rebellion by abusing the indigenous peoples. In face of the events and Garzón's accusation Ustariz sent Pedro de Molina Vasconcelos as judge to the Governorate of Chiloé. Molina destituted Marín as governor. Molina found Marín guilty among other things of allowing the kidnapping of children, and allowing abuses of the Encomienda system. The 1715 trial of residence of Ustariz changed the situation as Ustariz was accused of having supported Garzón's insubordination and protecting him afterwards. This done, Marín was reconstituted as Royal Governor of Chiloé in 1715.

Government offices
Preceded by	Royal Governor of Chiloé; 1708–1719	Succeeded by Nicolás Salvo
