= Chamiza Wetland =

Marine wetland in Reloncaví Sound, Chile

Coordinates: 41°30′00″S 72°50′00″W

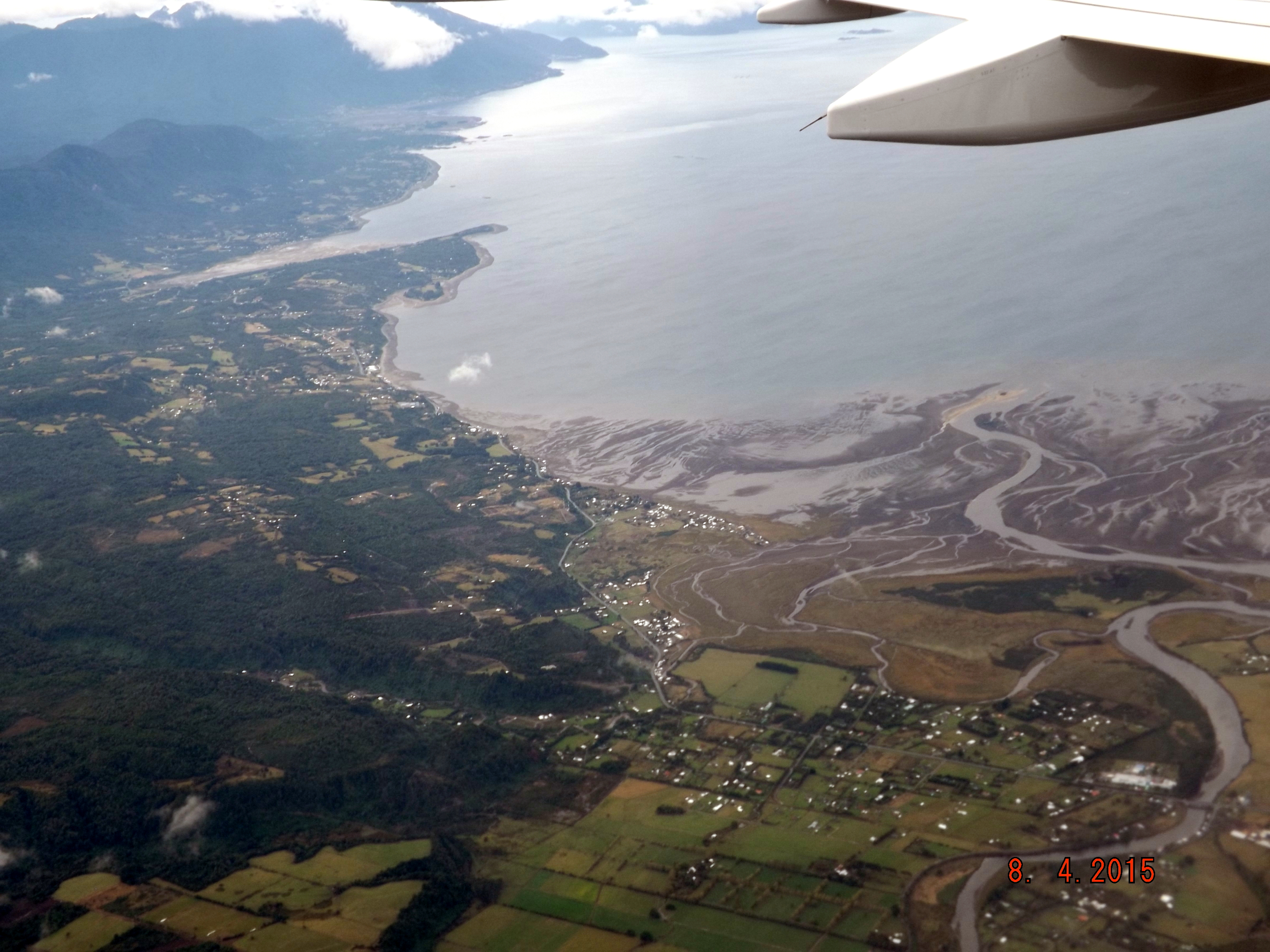
Aerial view of Chamiza Wetland, 2015.

Chamiza Wetland (Spanish: Humedal de Chamiza) is a marine wetland in Reloncaví Sound in southern Chile. The wetland lies around the outflow of Chamiza River east of the city of Puerto Montt and close to northernmost section of Carretera Austral. The wetland has been the site of various studies of waders and marine invertebrates. Urbanizations and dog attacks on birds have been identified as threats to the ecosystem of the wetland.
