= Tabon Island (Chile) =

Island in Chile

Coordinates: 41.90845°S 73.114802°W

Native name: Isla Tabón
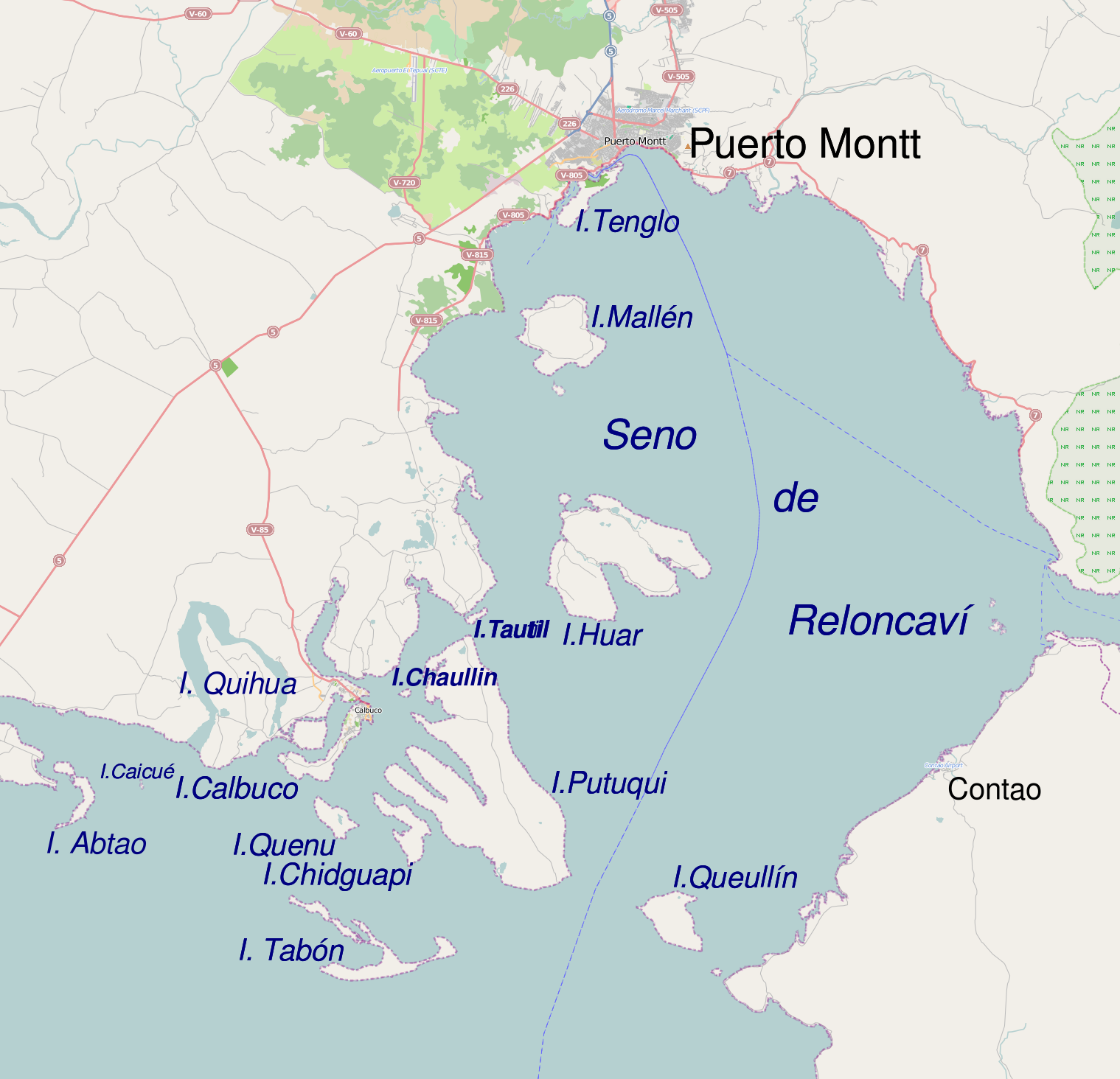
- Calbuco Archipelago South of Puerto Montt
- Interactive map of Tabon Island

Administration
- Chile
- Region: Los Lagos
- Province: Llanquihue
- Commune: Calbuco

Demographics
- Population: 350 (2008 US Hydrographic survey)

Additional information
- NGA UFI -889086

Tabon Island, or Isla Tabón, is part of the Calbuco Archipelago, located in Chile.

At high tide the water level covers the pebble ridges that connect the island's peaks, dividing it into three sub-islands: Lin, Ilto, and Polmalluelhe.
