= Tabon Island =

Tabon Island may refer to:

- Tabon Island (Chile)
- Tabon Island (Philippines)
