= Villacastín =

- Municipality
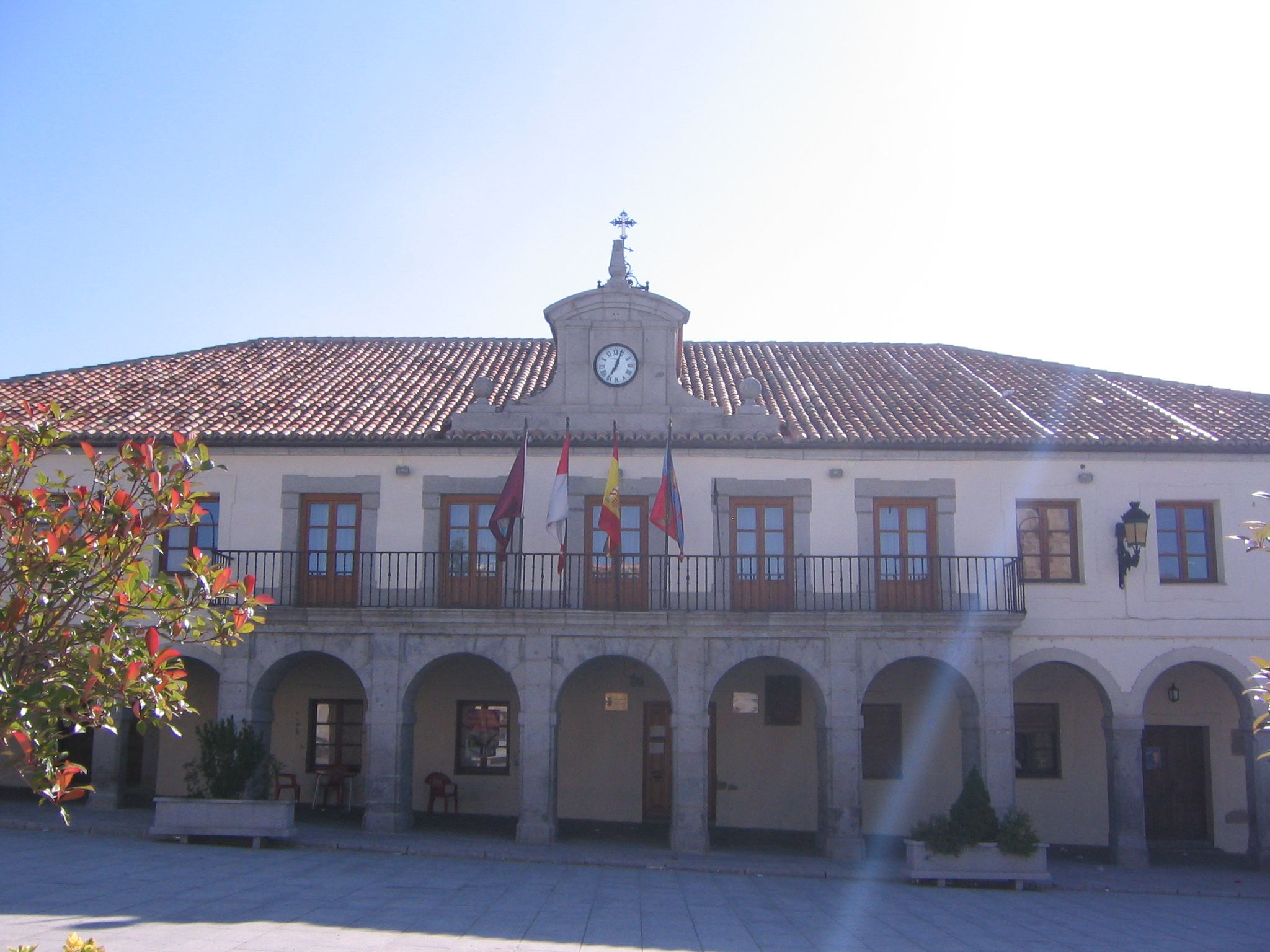

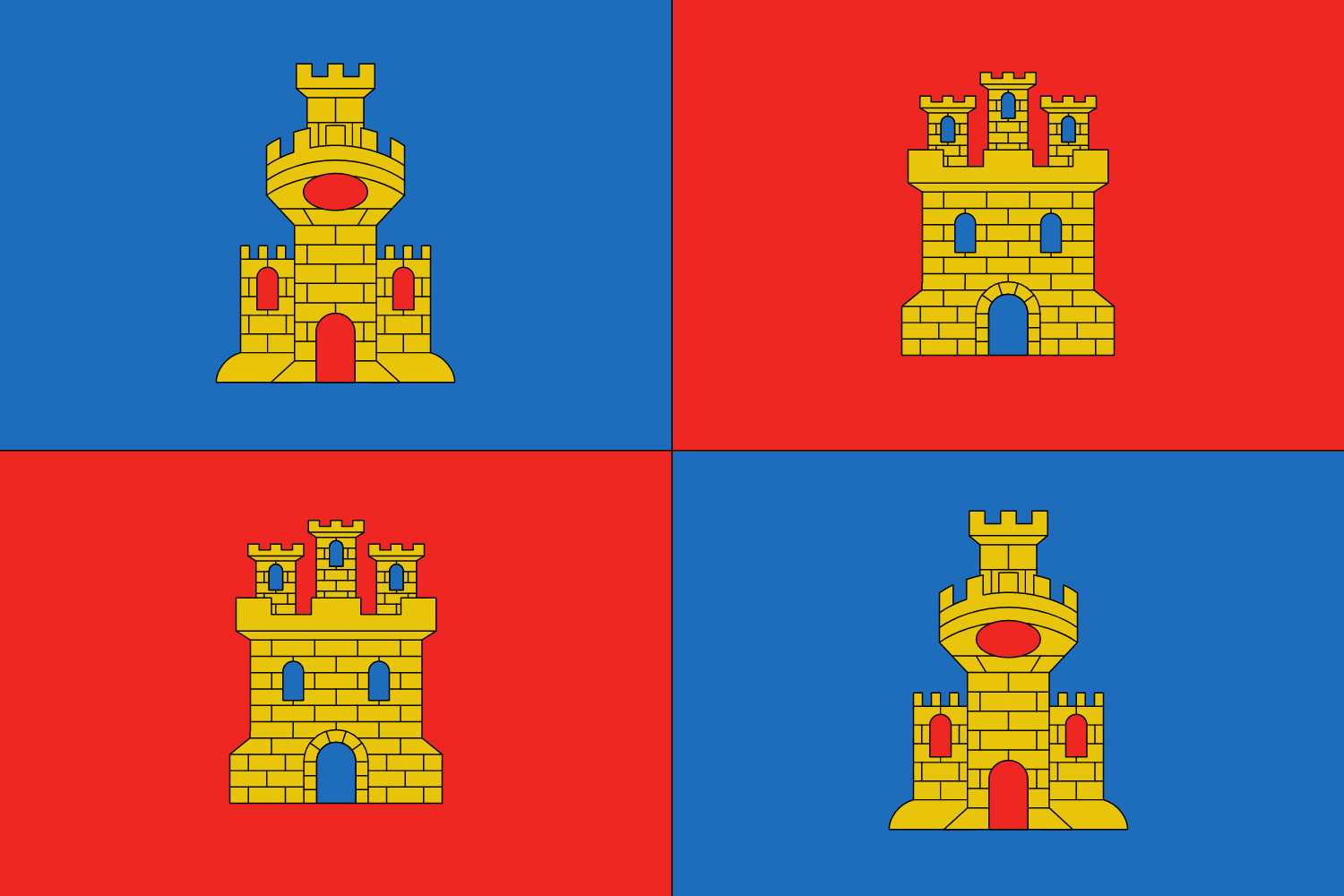
- Flag Coat of arms

- Location in Spain. Villacastín (Spain)
- Coordinates: 40°46′50″N 4°24′49″W
- Country: Spain
- Autonomous community: Castile and León
- Province: Segovia
- Municipality: Villacastín

Area
  - Total: 109 km^{2} (42 sq mi)

Population (2025-01-01)
  - Total: 1,567
  - Density: 14.4/km^{2} (37.2/sq mi)
- Time zone: UTC+1 (CET)
  - Summer (DST): UTC+2 (CEST)
- Website: Official website

Villacastín is a municipality located in the province of Segovia, Castile and León, Spain. According to the 2004 census (INE), the municipality has a population of 1,572 inhabitants.

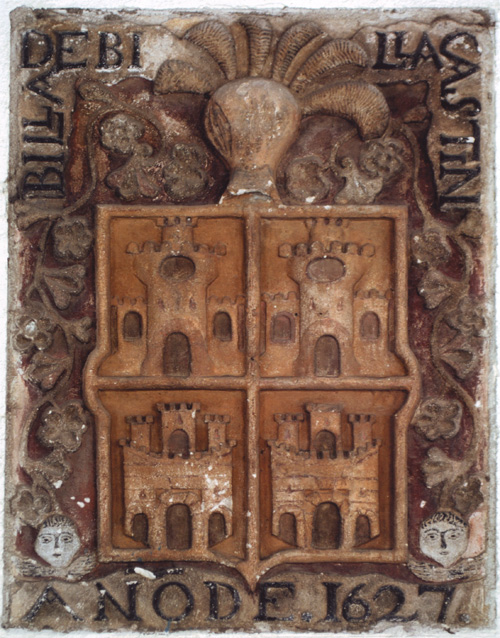
Coat of Arms of the Villacastín recorded in the year of 1627

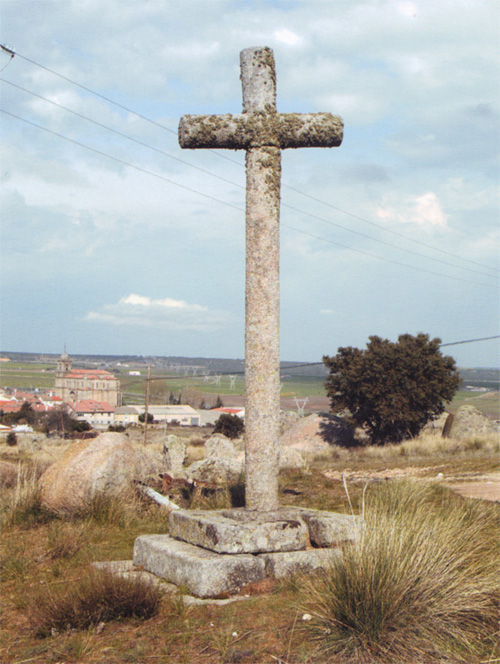
In La Cruz de Santiago prayed the knights of Castile before the battles during the Early Middle Ages.

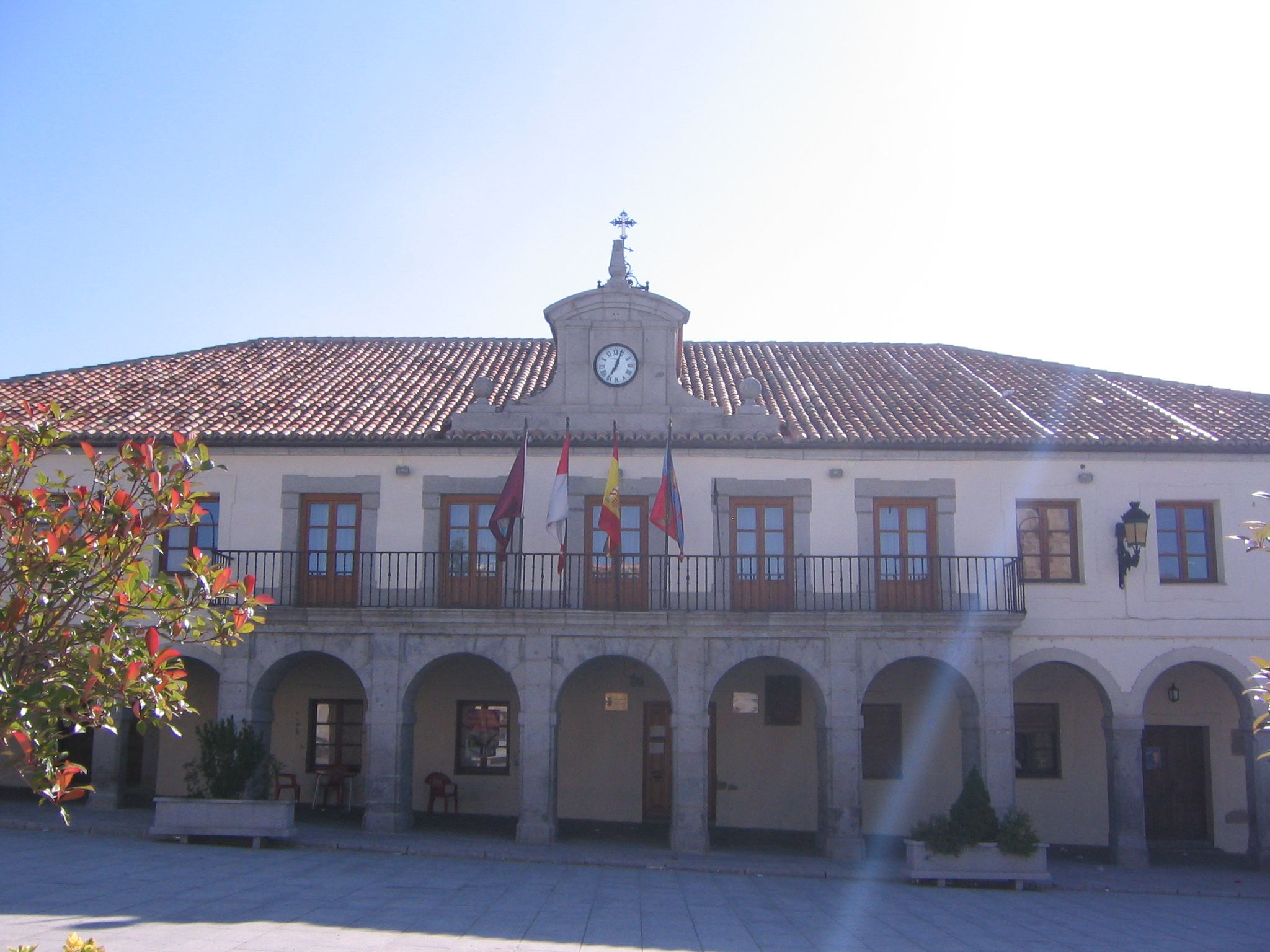
Ayuntamiento.

== People ==
- Francisco Hernández Ortiz-Pizarro (1555-1613), founder of Fort Calbuco, Chile.
