= Chaullin Island (Calbuco) =

Island in Los Lagos Region, Chile

Native name: Isla Chaullin
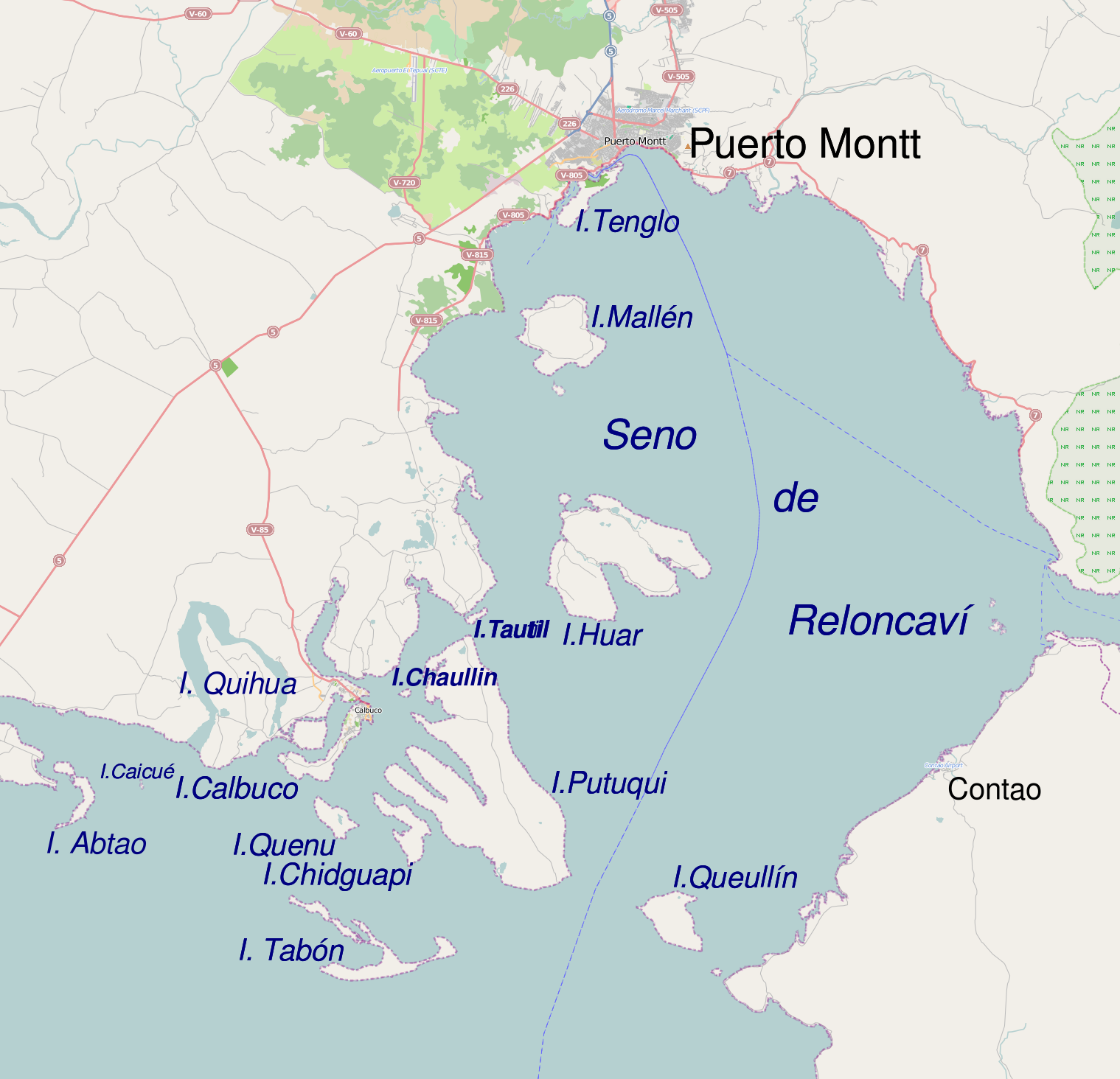
- Chaullin Island, east of Calbuco Island

Geography
- Coordinates: 41.75838°S 73.09876°W
- Archipelago: Calbuco Archipelago

Administration
- Chile
- Region: Los Lagos
- Province: Llanquihue
- Commune: Calbuco

Additional information
- NGA UFI -876702

Chaullin Island (Helvecia Island) is an islet part of the Calbuco Archipelago and is located between Putuqui Island and the west shore of the Reloncaví Sound with an approximate population of 12,500.
