= Juan Antonio Garretón =

Spanish military officer

Royal Governor of Chiloé
- In office 1761–1765
- Monarch: Charles III
- Preceded by: Antonio Narciso de Santa María
- Succeeded by: Manuel Fernández de Castelblanco

Personal details
- Born: c. 1714 Zaragoza, Spain
- Died: 1782 Lima, Peru
- Spouse: Benigna Fernández y Lorca
- Profession: Soldier

Military service
- Allegiance: Spain
- Battles/wars: Battle of Río Bueno

Juan Antonio Garretón (born in Aragón, Spain) was a Spanish army officer who served in different positions in Colonial Chile and Chiloé.

Garretón led Spanish forces based in Valdivia to victory in the Battle of Río Bueno of 1759. This battle was a break to a previous policy of befriending indigenous communities on behalf of the Spanish authorities in Valdivia.

Following his stay in Valdivia he served as Royal Governor of Chiloé from 1761 to 1765. Garretón had difficult relation with indigenous peoples and the Jesuits of Chiloé. His removal from the position of Royal Governor of Chiloé was related to his violation the secrecy of correspondence of local Jesuits.

Government offices
Preceded by Antonio Narciso de Santa María	Royal Governor of Chiloé; 1761–1765	Succeeded by Manuel Fernández de Castelblanco
