= Real de alerce =

Real de alerce or real de madera (Spanish for "real of Fitzroya" and "real of wood") was a regional currency and commodity money consisting in Fitzroya wood that was used during colonial times in Chiloé Archipelago. It was the Jesuits, established in Chiloé since the 17th century that established Fitzroya as a major export product towards the Viceroyalty of Peru. Real de alerce was also used by some encomenderos to pay their taxes.

== See also ==
- 1712 Huilliche rebellion

== Sources ==
- Otero, Luis (2006). La huella del fuego: Historia de los bosques nativos. Poblamiento y cambios en el paisaje del sur de Chile. Pehuén Editores. ISBN 956-16-0409-4. Page 73.
