= Francisco Hernández Ortiz-Pizarro =

Francisco Hernández Ortiz-Pizarro (1555–1613) was the founder of Fort Calbuco. He was born in Villacastín, Spain. Having survived the Destruction of the Seven Cities he led a group of loyal Huilliches to the area of Chacao Channel where Fort Calbuco was established.

== Biography ==
=== Early years ===
He was born in Villacastín, a town near the city of Segovia, which is located on one of the eastern slopes of the Sierra del Guadarrama. Francisco's father was a full-fledged man and enjoyed a comfortable position thanks to the degreasing and padding of wool fabrics. In the Church of Villacastín there is a religious effigy on whose pedestal is the following inscription:

: "Dr. Don Tomas Pizarro, Oidor of the Royal Audience of Guadalajara in Indias, originally from this town and grandson Mr. Francisco Hernández Ortiz Pizarro, gave this sculpture to Our Lady of Carrascal" Felix Martin M

=== Marriage ===
He married María Cortés Monroy (circa 1601), then an 18-year-old girl, daughter of Captain Pedro Cortés and Elena de Tovar.

=== Conquest of Chile ===
He begins a trip to South America and arrives in Chile. Arrived in Santiago de Chile, he fully integrated to fight the indigenous rebellions. He stood out in the capture of Fort Hualqui. He wintered in Paicaví, in 1578, in a time of so many "waters and storms and cold" that "for two and a half months it did not let a single day of rain". His brother, Andrés Ortiz died around this date. The other died crossing the Atlantic. Marshal Martín Ruiz de Gamboa appointed him Captain in 1580 to pacify the Chillán area. it collaborated to populate the city in its beginnings as San Bartolomé de Chillán. Then he remained two years as mayor of Villarrica. Later in the writings as "Corregidor of the city of Osorno and its terms"

In Osorno he must face the Huilliche rebellion that around 1603 sought to destroy the city and expel the Spanish from the territory. In this context, supported by friendly Indians, he leads the exodus of survivors heading south, where they reach the sector of the current Calbuco commune, where they finally settle. In that place a temporary fort is founded, which is followed by the foundation of a second military settlement in the current town of Carelmapu. During this period and until 1604 he administered those territories as Governor of Chiloé.

== Encomendero ==
The governor Alonso García Ramón awarded him an encomienda of Indians in Concepción and a land grant in Conchalí –Canela La Baja- in the Choapa valley, a fiefdom that Francisco would not get to know.

== Death ==
Litigation filed by Dona Maria Cortes Monroy demanding land grant of Canela Baja, we know that Francisco Hernandez Ortiz-Pizarro was already dead in 1613.
