= Bordemar =

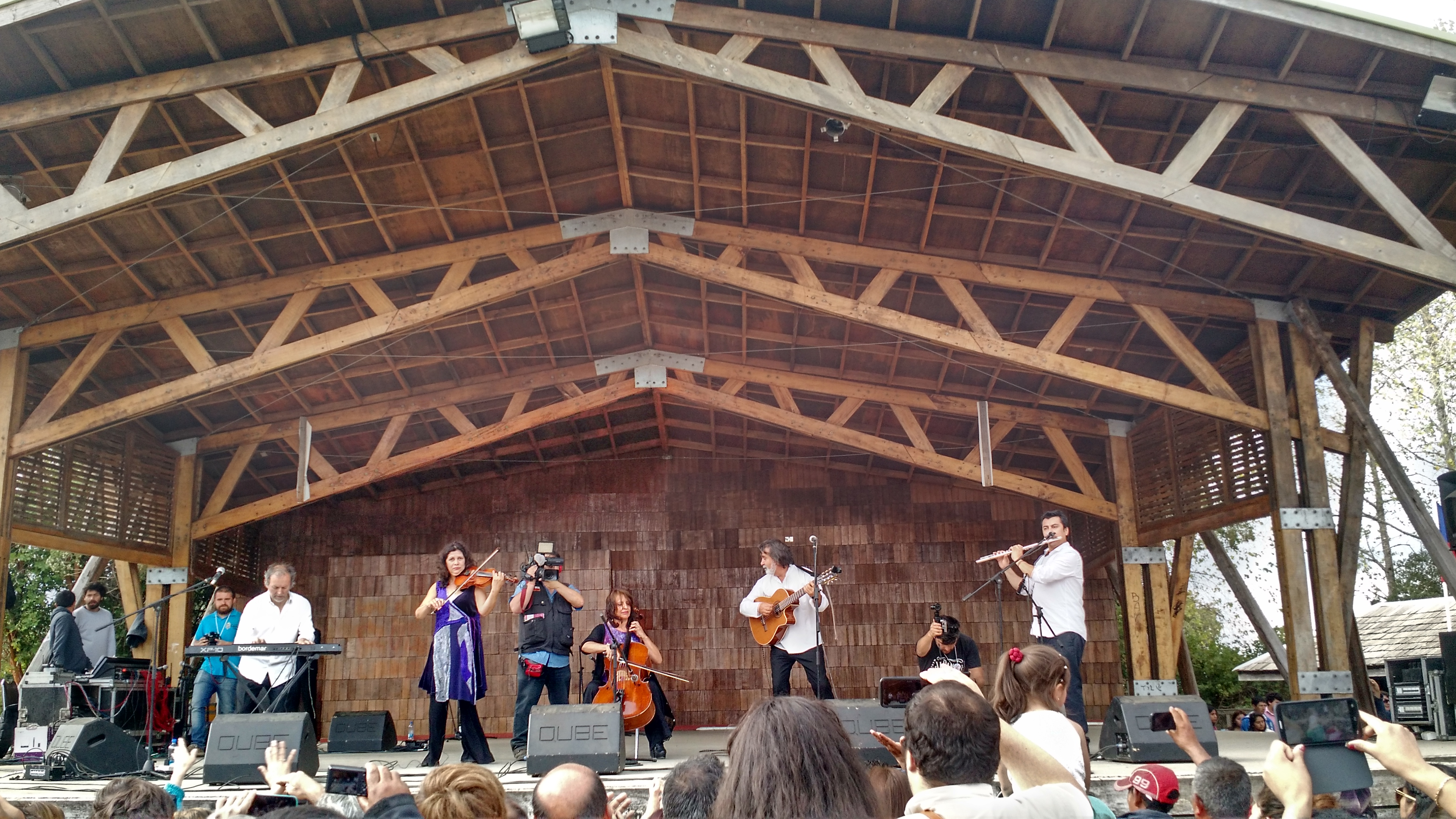

Background information
- Origin: Puerto Montt, Chile
- Genres: Folk music, andean music, baroque music
- Years active: 1983–present
- Labels: Alerce
- Members: Jaime Barría; Soledad Guarda; Fernando Álvarez; Eugenia Olavarría; Carlos Ralil
- Past members: Catherine Hall (deceased)
- Website: www.bordemar.scd.cl

Bordemar is a Chilean folk andean music band formed in Puerto Montt, Chile.

Its members are professors of music education and formed the band in Puerto Montt in 1983. The name of the band consists of a set of words "Borde del Mar" (English, Edge of the Sea).

They have created openings songs for TV shows such as Tierra Adentro (TVN) and Identidades (Discovery Channel).

== Band members ==
=== Current members ===
- Fernando Álvarez Macías – vocalist, guitar
- Jaime Barría Casanova – keyboards, percussion
- Soledad Guarda Andrade – vocalist, violoncello
- Eugenia Olavarría – fiddle
- Carlos Ralil – western concert flute, saxophone

=== Former members ===
- Raúl Faure – fiddle
- Luis Ritter – western concert flute
- Claudio Brellenthin – percussion, guitar
- Catherine Hall † – western concert flute
- Florencio Jaramillo – fiddle
- Felipe Canales – double bass
- Juan del Río – fiddle
- Daniel Pardo – guita
- Mauricio Campos – guitar

== Discography ==
=== Studio albums ===
- Colores de Chiloé (1987)
- Bordevals (1991)
- Mar Interior (1994)
- Al Abordaje (1998)
- E-Mar (2001)
- Monte Verde (2014)

=== Compilation albums ===
- Sur de Chile (1997)
- Bordemar 1983-2003 (2003)

=== Live albums ===
- Música de Bordemar (1984)
- Banda Bordemar 2 (1986)
