= Tenglo Island =

Island in Chile

Native name: Isla Tenglo
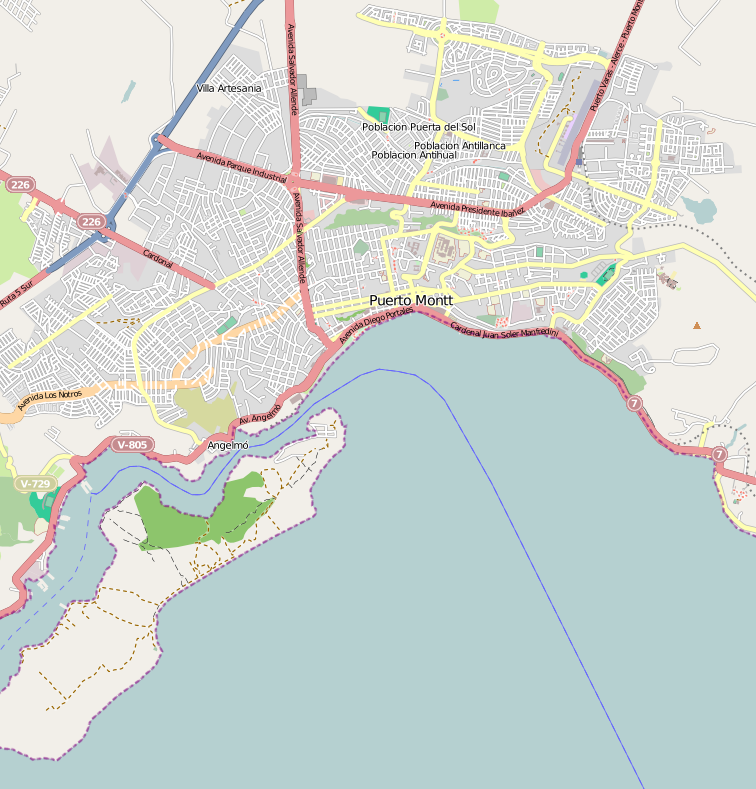
- Tenglo Island, Tenglo Channel, Angelmo and Puerto Montt

Geography
- Coordinates: 41.498124°S 72.972732°W
- Adjacent to: Reloncaví Sound, Pacific Ocean
- Total islands: 1

Administration
- Chile
- Region: Los Lagos
- Province: Llanquihue
- Commune: Puerto Montt

Additional information
- NGA UFI -902592

Tenglo Island is separated from Puerto Montt by the Tenglo Channel in Reloncaví Sound, Los Lagos Region, Chile.

== See also ==
- List of islands of Chile
