= Church of Tenaún =

Church in Chile

UNESCO World Heritage Site
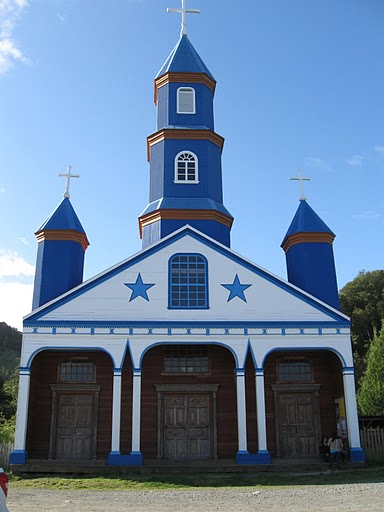
- Front of the church

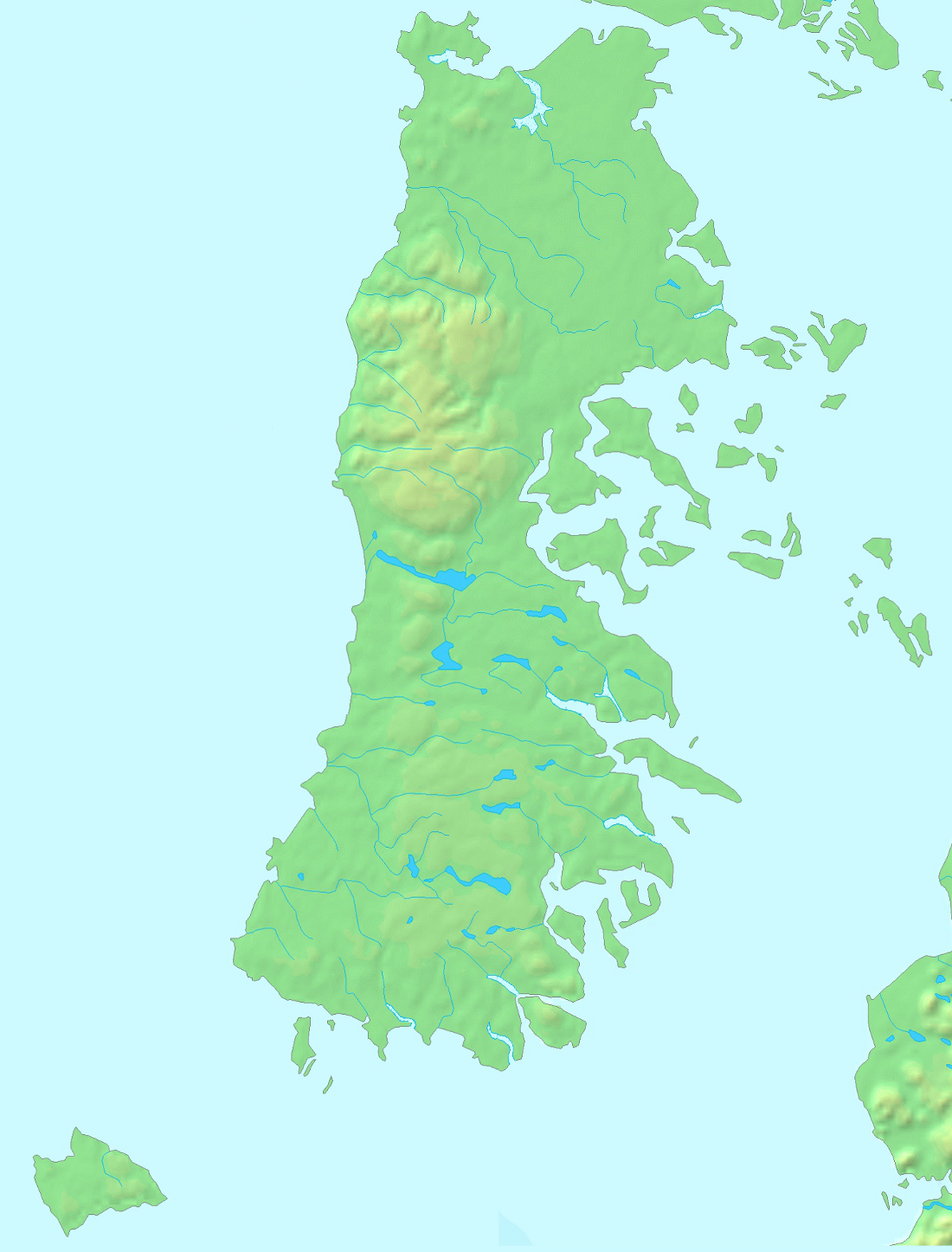
- Location within Chiloé Location within Los Lagos Location within Chile
- Location: Tenaún, Dalcahue, Chiloé Island, Chiloé Province, Los Lagos Region, Chile
- Part of: Churches of Chiloé
- Criteria: Cultural: (ii), (iii)
- Reference: 971-011
- Inscription: 2000 (24th Session)
- Area: 0.38 ha (0.94 acres)
- Coordinates: 42°15′37″S 73°27′28″W

The Church of Tenaún or Church of Our Lady of Patrocinio (Patronage)— Spanish: Iglesia de Tenaún, Iglesia de Nuestra Señora del Patrocinio— is a Catholic church located in the town of Tenaún, commune of Dalcahue on the Chiloé Archipelago, Los Lagos Region, southern Chile.

The Church of Tenaún was declared a National Monument of Chile in 1999 and is one of the 16 Churches of Chiloé that were declared UNESCO World Heritage Sites on 30 November 2000.

“Tenaún” means “three peaks” in the native language of the area, and it is believed that the church’s three pillars symbolize this. The patron saint of the Church of Tenaún is Our Lady of Patrocinio, whose feast day is celebrated on January 30.

This church leads the parish of Patrocinio San José, Tenaún, one of the 24 parishes that form the Diocese of Ancud.

== Architectural characteristics ==
The Church of Tenaún has a length of 42.40 meters and a width of 14 meters, the height of the central nave is 6.90 meters, while the height of the lateral nave is 4.30 meters. Its highest tower has a height of 26.10 meters.

The church is based on a base of stones and coigüe wood. Its structure is composed mainly of wood of tepa, tenío and canelo. The interior lining is made of larch wood, while the outer covering is made of larch tiles and cypress overlap of the Guaitecas and larch. The roof is made of corrugated sheets of galvanized iron.

The church of Tenaún has a good state of conservation. It was restored in 1999, between 2005 and 2006, the tower and the facade were restored; Between May 2010 and May 2011, the nave and the vault were restored.

== See also ==
- Churches of Chiloé
