= Antonio Narciso de Santa María =

Former Spanish Colonel and Governor

Royal Governor of Chiloé
- In office 1749–1761
- Monarchs: Ferdinand VI; Charles III
- Preceded by: Victoriano Martínez de Tineo
- Succeeded by: Juan Antonio Garretón

Personal details
- Born: 1716 Alcántara, Spain
- Died: September 13, 1777 (aged 60–61)

Military service
- Allegiance: Spain
- Years of service: 1730–1774
- Rank: Second lieutenant
- Unit: Second Battalion of the King of Portugal

Antonio Narciso de Santa María (Alcántara, Spain; 1716 – 1777) was a Spanish colonel and Governor of Chiloé in the mid-18th century. Given the threat of war with Britain at the time Governor Antonio Narciso de Santa María highlighted for the Spanish authorities the key position of Chiloé Island to control the Patagonian Archipelagos and recommended to focus on the defences in Chiloé. He retired from the army in 1774 and lived in Concepción. He died in 1777. It was following Narciso de Santa María's recommendations that the Spanish founded the "city-fort" of Ancud in 1767–1768.

Government offices
Preceded by Victoriano Martínez de Tineo	Royal Governor of Chiloé; 1749–1761	Succeeded by Juan Antonio Garretón
