= Battle of Río Bueno (1759) =

Spanish victory against indigenous peoples in Chile

- Part of Arauco War
Date	January 27, 1759
Location	Bueno River
Result	Disputed

Belligerents
Spanish Empire	Mapuche-Huilliche

Commanders and leaders
Juan Antonio Garretón	Catillanca; Paidil

The Battle of Río Bueno in 1759 was a military engagement between Spanish colonial forces and local Huilliche in the Bueno River of south-central Chile. The battle was fought on January 27 with the Spanish forces led by Juan Antonio Garretón. The battle of 1759 was an exception to the overall policy of befriending indigenous communities on behalf of the Spanish authorities in Valdivia.

Beginning in the mid-18th century the Spanish enclave of Valdivia started a period of agricultural expansion. The expansion was mainly directed to the south and was done mostly by pacific means, but hostilities with indigenous Huilliches did occur. In 1758 Huilliche chief Huarán requested Spanish soldiers to defend his lands against his Cunco enemies. The Governor of Valdivia Ambrosio Sáes de Bustamante responded to this call leading to the Battle of Río Bueno in 1759.

There are differing views on the outcome of this battle; according to Diego Barros Arana it was a Spanish victory, yet historian Salvador Rumian Cisterna considers that with the battle chiefs Catrillanca and Paidil managed to halt any further Spanish advance.

After the battle captured Huilliches told the Spanish about the existence of uncontacted Spanish settlements further inside indigenous territory, invigorating belief among the populace of Valdivia about the legendary City of the Caesars. Ignacio Pinuer, a staunch believer in the existence of the city, was present in the battle of Río Bueno claiming "the Caesars" participated in the "Christian" side by attacking the indigenous rearguard at night, securing thus a Spanish victory.
