= Calbuco Archipelago =

Archipelago in Llanquihue Province, Chile

Native name: Archipiélago de Calbuco
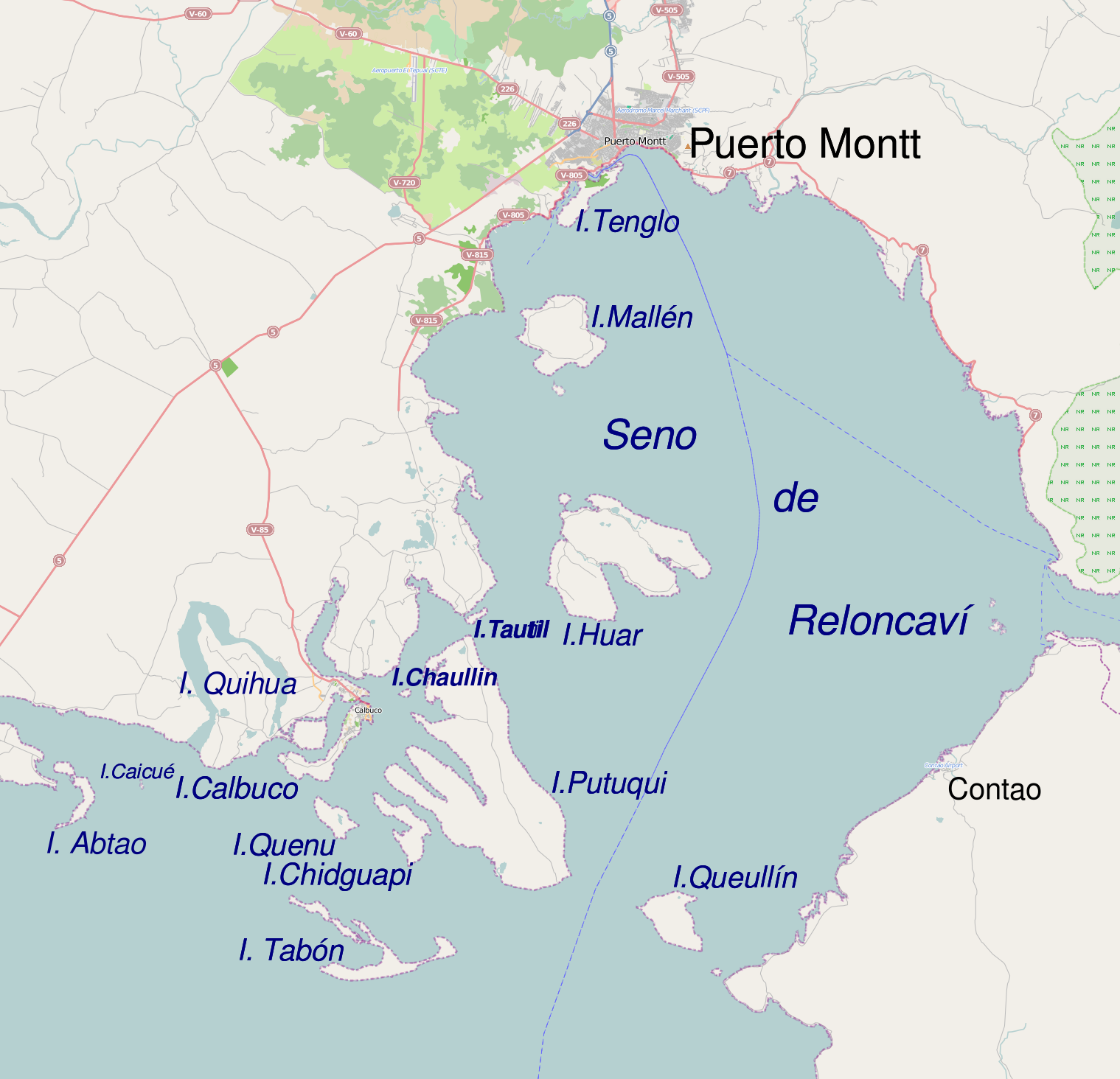
- Interactive map of Calbuco Archipelago

Geography
- Coordinates: 41°48′S 73°02′W
- Adjacent to: Reloncaví Sound

Administration
- Chile
- Region: Los Lagos
- Province: Llanquihue
- Commune: Calbuco

Additional information
- NGA UFI -874659 (only Calbuco Island)

Calbuco Archipelago is located in the Reloncaví Sound, Llanquihue Province, Los Lagos Region, Chile.

The archipelago is composed of 14 islands.

== List of islands ==
The islands are:

1. Puluqui
2. Caicué / Lagartija
3. Queulín
4. Chaullín / Helvecia (not to be confused with Chaullin Island (Chiloe))
5. Huar / Guar
6. Abtao
7. Chidhuapi
8. Quenu
9. Quihua
10. Tautil
11. Calbuco / Caicaén
12. Tabón
13. Mayelhue
14. Lín

The last three islands, Tabon, Mayelhue and Lin, are by low tide only one island.
