= Tenaún =

Coordinates: 42°19′56″S 73°22′24″W

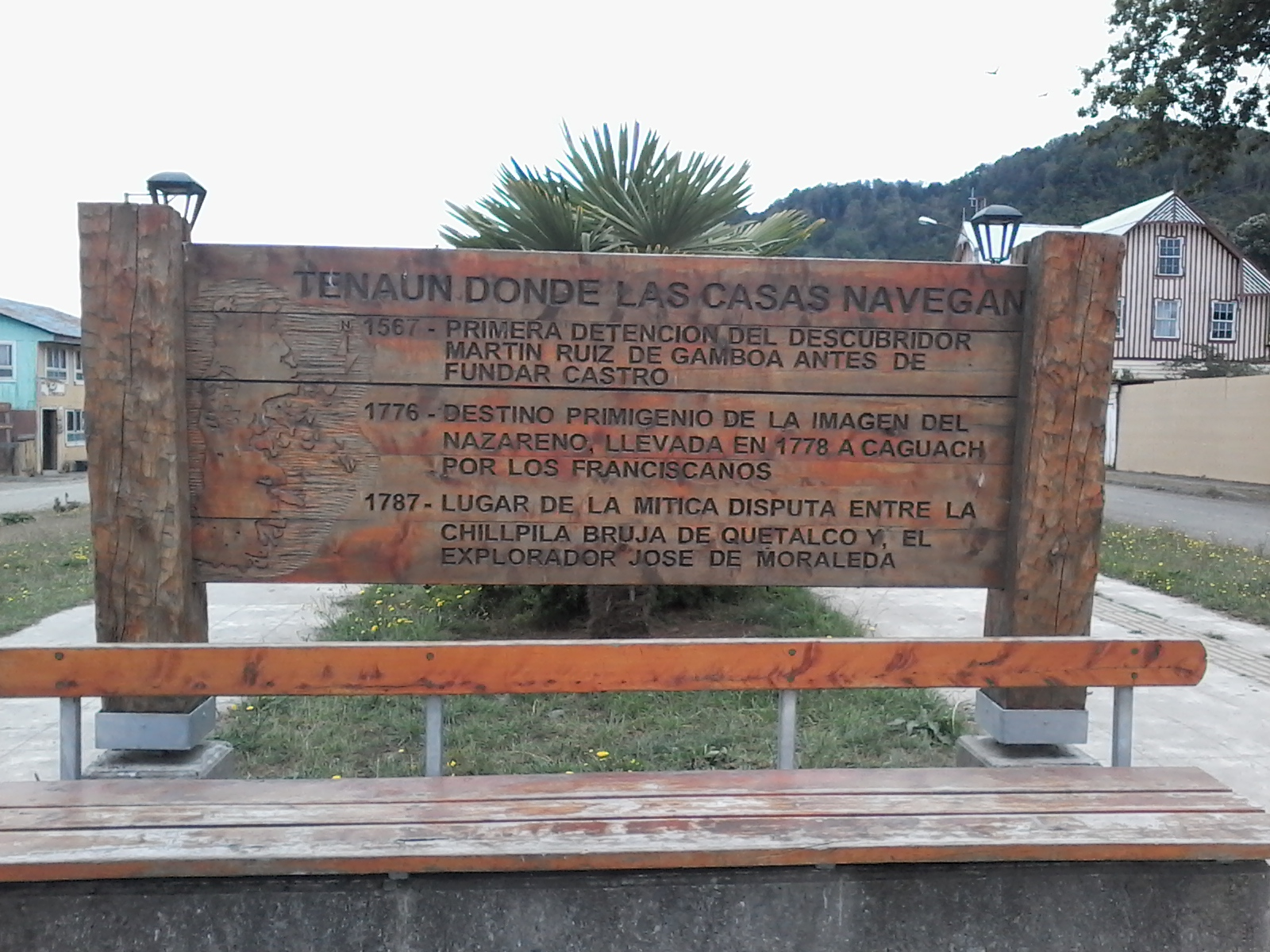
Sign with local historical events in Tenaún

Tenaún is a Chilean village within the commune of Dalcahue, on Chiloé Island of Chiloé Archipelago. It is located about 36 kilometers from Dalcahue, 28 kilometers from Quemchi and 54 kilometers from Castro. The town of Tenaún is accessed from the north, by a road that begins on the route between Dalcahue and Quemchi. This land route, built in 1950, allowed the integration of the town to the rest of the island.

The town of Tenaún was founded in the 18th century, being one of the oldest in Chiloé. It was part of the larch trade route and since its inception was an intermediate port between Chacao and Castro. In the 19th century, it experienced an urban boom as a result of logging that favored its development. Thanks to the historical relevance of the forest trade is that many of the houses of the town were built with larch coatings.

The urban landscape is composed of the edge-sea, a longitudinal plane parallel to the coastline. The urban order of the town has as axes: the church, the square and the cemetery, in east-west direction.

The church of Tenaún, built in the mid-nineteenth century, is located at the end of the main street and in front of the square, it is the most imposing construction of the town, it stands out for its three towers and because it protrudes from the axis, which allows its vision from afar, mainly from the sea. The year 1999 was declared a National Historic Monument and the year 2000 a World Heritage Site by UNESCO.

The elongated square is another of the emblems of the city, made up of two facades that form a recognizable group with their own identity, marking a boundary between the high houses, which face the hill, and the low ones that face the sea.

One of the most deeply rooted traditions in this town is the Minga, which consists in the transfer of houses through the sea or land. In the area, this tradition has a social event of great participation that favors interaction and community sense strongly rooted in Chiloe identity.

== History ==
The word Tenaún means "three hills" in the Mapuche Huilliche language, the language of the ancient Huilliche inhabitants of the sector.

It was founded in 1567, the year in which the Spanish conquistadors, led by Martín Ruiz de Gamboa, settled in Chiloé after founding Castro. The village emerged as a town of merchants who extracted larch from the Chauques Islands.

The town maintains its original characteristics and is recognized as a focus of permanence of the Chilote traditions. By virtue of its cultural value, on November 5, 2004 it was declared a National Monument in the category of a Typical Zone.

On September 4, 2015, Tenaún was declared an Urban Zone by the Municipality of Dalcahue.

== Attractions ==
Tenaún is characterized by the style of its houses, some of them neo-colonial style with German influence, while others are lined with larch tiles. Several of the latter were taken to Tenaún by land and even by sea, through the traditional Chilote system known as the minga of house plowing, to such an extent that the place is known as "the town where the houses sail".

Its church, called Nuestra Señora del Patrocinio, is a National Monument (1999) and was declared a World Heritage Site by UNESCO in 2000, along with the other churches of Chiloé. It was built in 1837 by Franciscan priest Roberto Fernández, and later was renovated in a neoclassical style, with a main tower and two smaller towers on each side, which could reflect the three hills of Tenaún or the mystery of the Holy Trinity.

Every summer the Meeting of the Cords of the Accordion is celebrated, an activity of great importance because the place is known for the importance of the artists of the area that participate in this festival, as is the week of Tenaún, where for 7 days there are activities for neighbors, tourists and people interested in participating to commemorate a new anniversary of Tenaún.
