= Indios reyunos =

During colonial times indios reyunos was a term to designate a group of Huilliche yanakuna that settled in the area of Calbuco and Abtao, Southern Chile. This group originated from the indigenous peoples that stayed loyal to the Spanish after the Destruction of the Seven Cities (1599–1604) and followed them from Valdivia and Osorno to the new settlements near Chiloé Archipelago. It is reported that they were initially 600 of which 300 settled in Calbuco. Because of their loyalty they were rewarded with an exemption from tributes and the encomienda and obtained salary from the Real Situado.

Indios reyunos played an important role in the 1712 conflict between Alejandro Garzón and José Marín de Velasco and the subsequent Huilliche rebellion in Chiloé. In this last rebellion the indios reyunos of Calbuco stayed loyal to the Spaniards imprisoning a messenger from Chiloé that invited them to join the rebellion.

== See also ==
- Indian auxiliaries
