= Calbuco River =

River in Cautín Province, Chile

Calbuco River is a river in Cautín Province, Chile.

The river is originating in Llaima Volcano and ending in Vilcún River, commune of Vilcún.
