= Reloncaví Sound =

Body of water in Chile

Coordinates: 41.7°S 72.8333°W

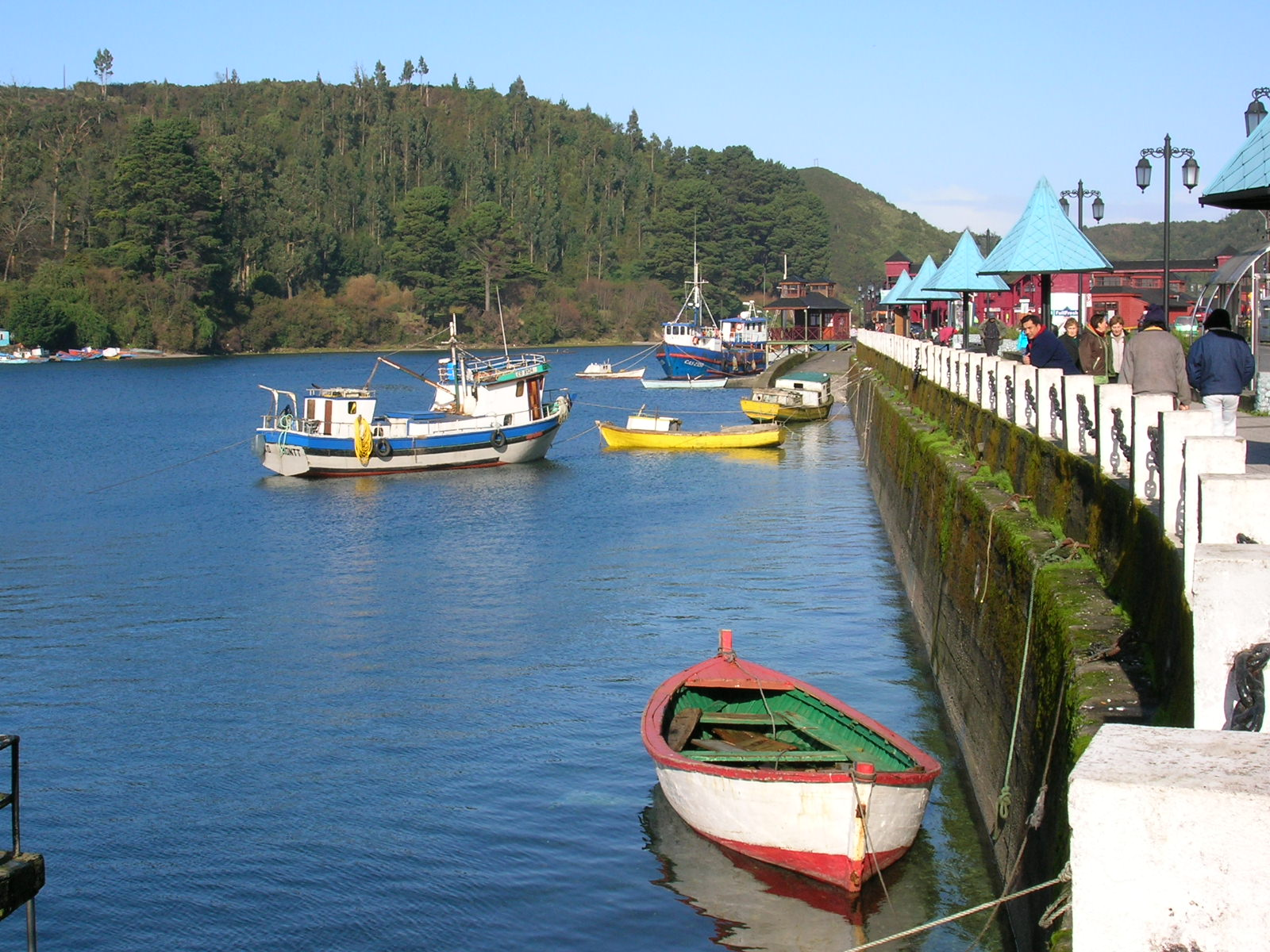
Reloncaví Sound

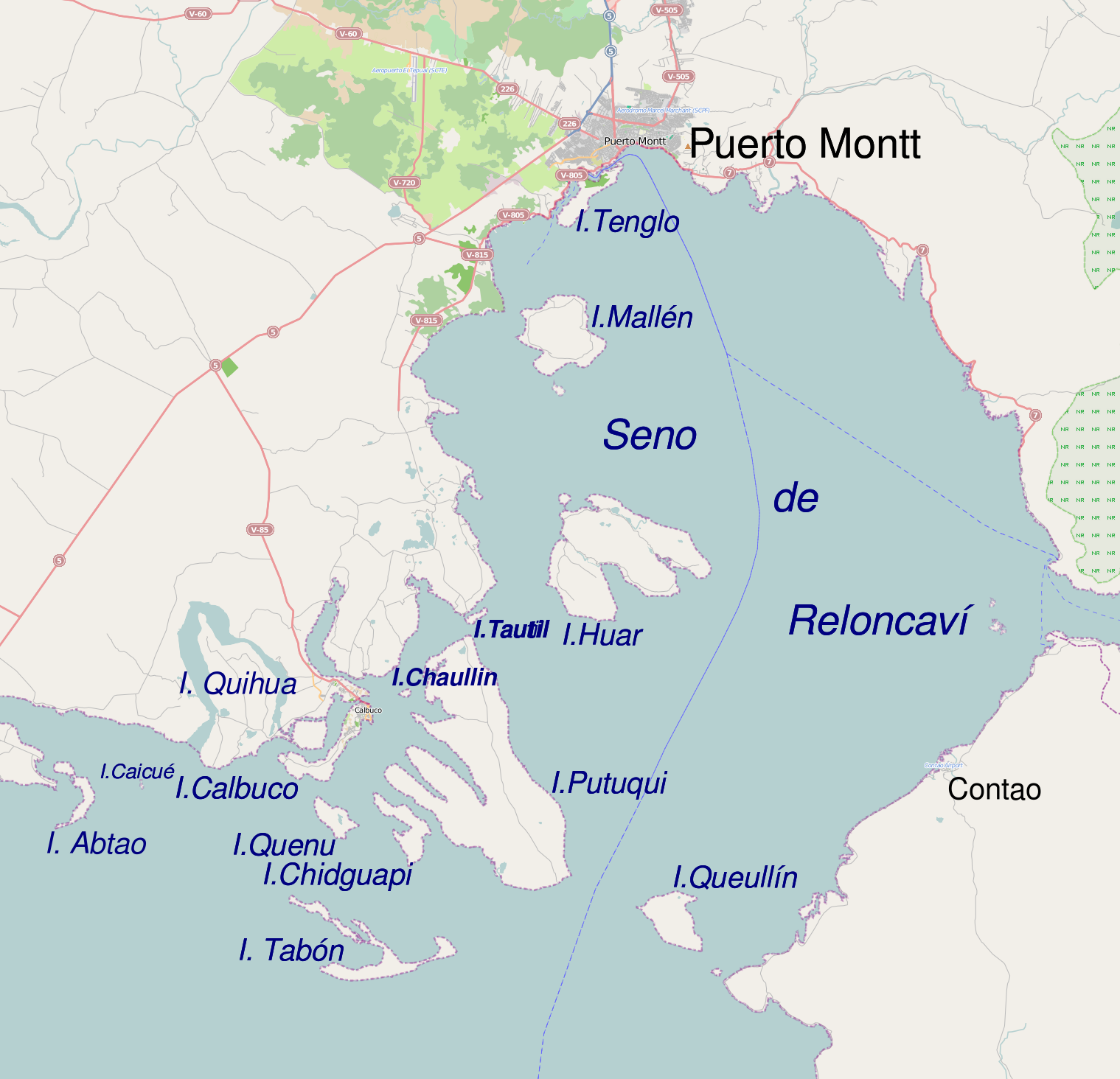
Map of Reloncaví Sound {Seno de Reloncaví)

Reloncaví Sound or Seno de Reloncaví is a body of water immediately south of Puerto Montt, a port city in the Los Lagos Region of Chile. It is the place where the Chilean Central Valley meets the Pacific Ocean.

The Calbuco Archipelago comprises the islands in the sound, including Tenglo, Maillén, and Huar Islands. Puluqui Island and Queulín Island separate the sound from the Gulf of Ancud.

The Carretera Austral runs along the eastern shore of the sound, but is interrupted in the area where the Reloncaví Estuary opens into this wide sound. Located in this same area is the Alerce Andino National Park, home to ancient alerce trees. Chamiza Wetland makes up a segment of Relonvací Sound northern shore east of Puerto Montt.
