= Chaullin Island (Chiloe) =

Part of the Chiloé Archipelago in Chile

Native name: Isla Chaullin (de Chiloe)
- South east of Chiloé Island: Quellón, Chaullín, Acuy, Tranqui, Coldita, Cailin, Laitec, Queilén

Geography
- Coordinates: 43.048669°S 73.448749°W

Administration
- Chile
- Region: Los Ríos
- Province: Chiloé Province
- Commune: Quinchao

Additional information
- NGA UFI=-876703

Chaullin Island is part of the Chiloé Archipelago in Chile.

== See also ==
- Chaullin Island (Calbuco)
