= Calbuco Department =

Former Department of Chile

Calbuco Department was a Department of Chile.

== History ==
- Before 4 July 1834: The territory was the Delegation of Calbuco, which was part of the Province of Chiloé, which was established on 30 August 1826.
- 4 July 1834: Created, as part of Chiloé Province, as part of the 1833 constitution.
- 28 February 1855: it became part of the new Carelmapu Department.
- 12 February 1937: again created by splitting Llanquihue Department in Llanquihue Province into four departments: the new Llanquihue Department, Puerto Varas Department, Maullín Department, Calbuco Department, with the same law
- 1970's: Calbuco Department was abolished, with the implementation of the New Political-Administrative Division. It is currently only used by the INE as a census district for purposes of the census.

In both periods of its existence its capital was Calbuco.
