= Huilliche uprising of 1712 =

Indigenous anti-Spanish uprising in Chile

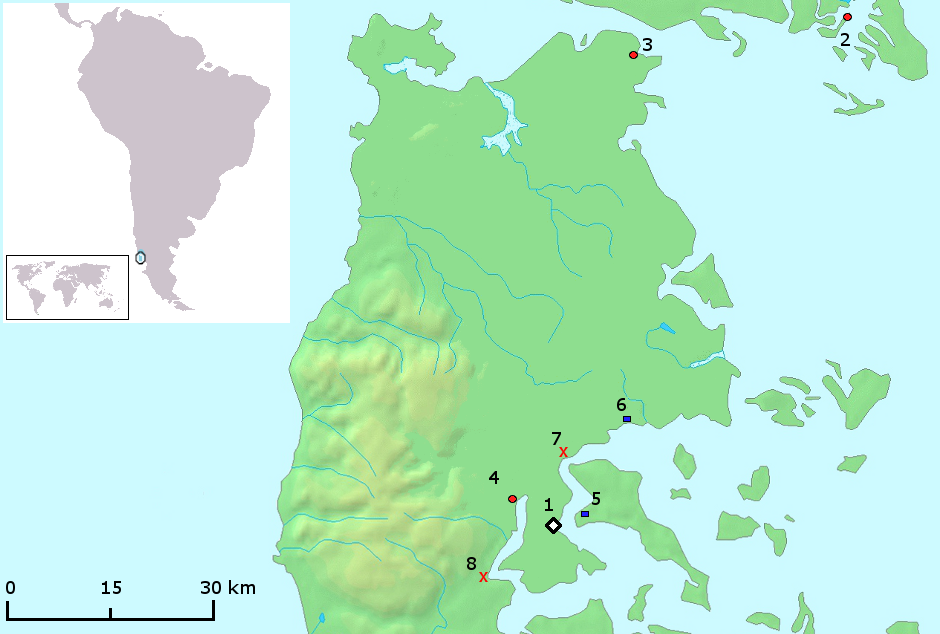
Date	10–18 February 1712
Location	Central Chiloé Archipelago
Result	See aftermath: Key encomenderos killed; Suppression of the rebellion; Encomienda system alleviated

Belligerents
(Spain) Spanish Empire	Huilliches of Chiloé

Casualties and losses
30 Spaniards	400 Huilliches

The Huilliche uprising of 1712 (Spanish: Rebelión huilliche de 1712) was an Indigenous uprising against the Spanish encomenderos of the Chiloé Archipelago, which was then a part of the Captaincy General of Chile. The rebellion took place in the central part of the archipelago.

== Background ==
Huilliches of Chiloé had previously taken action against their Spanish lords back in 1600, when a group helped the Dutch corsair Baltazar de Cordes attack the Spanish settlement of Castro. Unlike that of continental Chile, the Indigenous population of Chiloé grew from 1700 onwards. By 1712 Indigenous peoples made up around 50% of the population of the archipelago. The encomiendas of Chiloé were the largest of Chile and their administration of this form of forced labor more abusive than on the mainland. Moreover, the encomenderos did not fulfill their obligations, registering neither tribute nor salaries. Encomenderos often did not pay legal salaries or salaries at all and did not observe the "free time" of Indians defined in the encomienda laws. The encomienda activities in Chiloé included the Indians traveling to the continental coast to log for alerce wood.

The Huilliches considered the abuses of José de Andrade a cause for rebellion, in particular, the whipping of Martín Antucan, an Indian de Andrade tied to an apple tree and flogged on his genitals with nettles, then covered in tow and set afire. According to testimonies gathered in 1725 José de Andrade judged wrongdoings himself, did not pay salaries, and tortured those who did not work due to illness. His son is reported to have had behaved similarly and his majordomo kidnapped children to send them to continental Chile. During a meeting on 26 January 1712 the Huilliches set 10 February as the date of their uprising. The objective of the rebellion was not the end of Spanish rule but vengeance for injustices they suffered.

== Rebellion ==
The strategy of the rebels focused on attacking Castro, the political and economic center of the islands which was also where most Spaniards lived and where most encomiendas were. On the night of 10 February, houses and haciendas of Spaniards in central Chiloé were attacked; Spaniards were killed and buildings set afire. Some Spaniards managed to fortify themselves in Castro while they were surrounded by rebels. Spanish women and children were taken as prisoners. On the first night of rebellion only notable Spaniards died; no Spaniards of low social standing or mestizos, friars or priests were attacked. Other Spaniards survived hidden in the forests.

The same day Spanish captains Juan de Aguilar and Diego Telles de Barrientos began to crush the rebellion. They subsequently fought in different places of Chiloé for eight days. Also on 10 February a Spanish militia began to kill Huilliches and were stopped only by the intervention of Jesuits.

Following the crushing of the rebellion a small group of Huilliches departed to the Guaitecas Archipelago to avoid harsh Spanish reprisals. Other insurgents sought refuge from the Spanish reprisal with Father Manuel del Hoyo in the Mission of Nahuel Huapi across the Andes.

== Aftermath ==
José Marín de Velasco, the Royal Governor of Chiloé, was suspended from his duties after the rebellion. However, he later obtained the approval of the King of Spain and returned to rule Chiloé in 1715, aiming to put the encomienda system under the rule of law. Indigenous complaints to the Spanish authorities increased after the rebellion.

The encomienda system was abolished in 1782 in Chiloé, in the rest of Chile in 1789, and in the whole Spanish Empire in 1791.

== See also ==
- Economic history of Chile
- Mission of Nahuel Huapi
