= Estero Calbuco =

River in Chile

Coordinates: 37°38′S 72°22′W

Estero Calbuco is a creek in Biobio Region of Chile.
