= Francisco Hurtado del Pino =

Spanish colonial officer

Francisco Hurtado del Pino was a Spanish colonial officer who served as the first and only Intendant of Chiloé between 1784 and 1789. In 1786 Viceroy of Peru Teodoro de Croix sent Hurtado del Pino navy officer José de Moraleda y Montero to aid him making accurate maps of the archipelago. Eventually Moraleda would stay in Chiloé until 1796 long after the intendantship of hurtado del Pino. After Hurtado's term ended the Intendancy of Chiloé was abolished and lieutenant colonel Francisco Garos took charge of the affairs in Chiloé Archipelago.

== Sources ==
- Urbina Burgos, R. (1986). La Intendencia de Chiloé y los conflictos del gobernador-intendente Francisco Hurtado: 1784–1789. Revista de Historia y Geografía, 154.

Political offices
Preceded by New office	Intendant of Chiloé; 1784–1789	Succeeded by Position abolished
