= Puerto Montt =

Puerto Montt Meli Pulli
- City and Commune
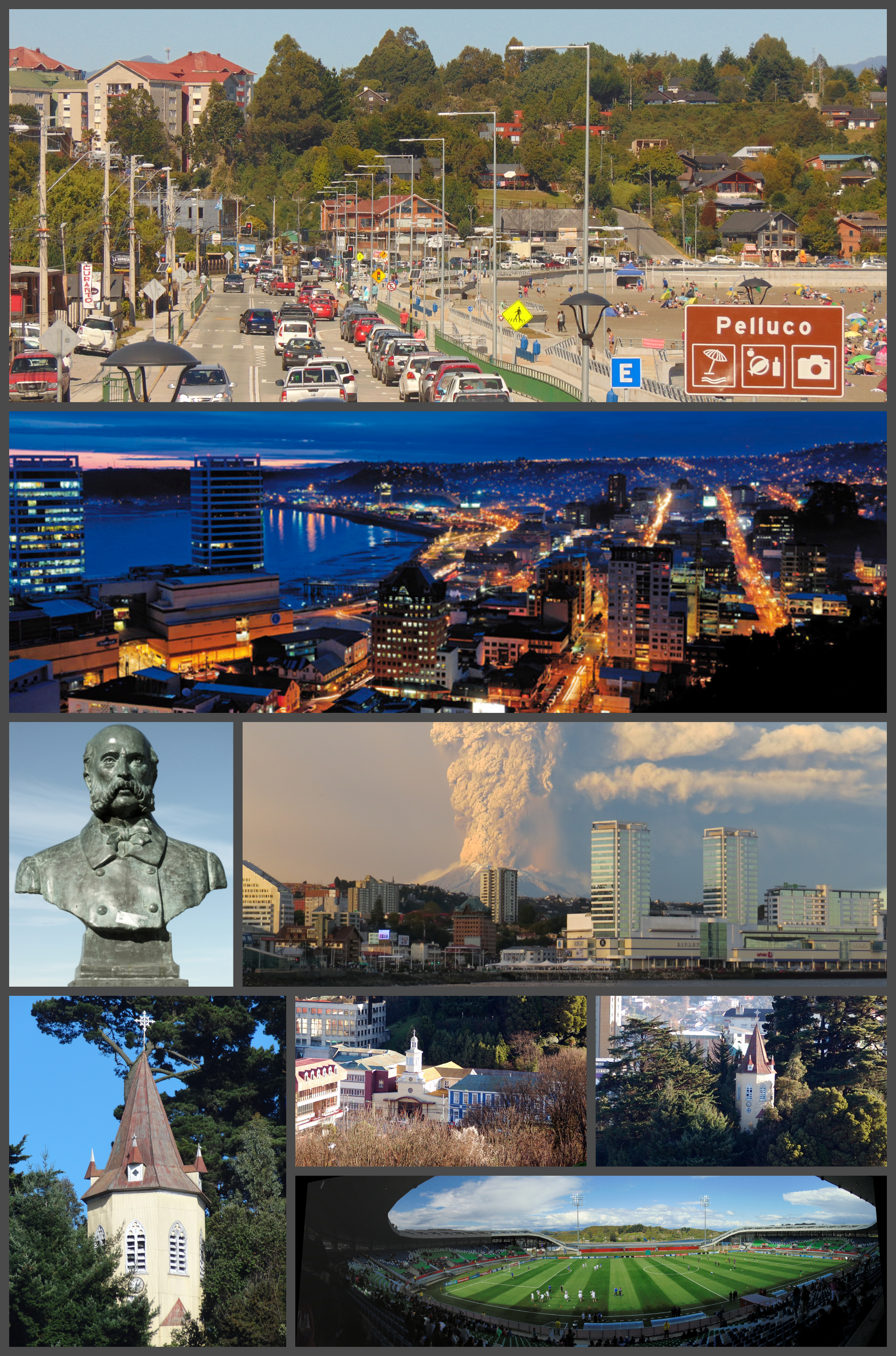
- 1st row: Pelluco, spa and tourist town in the commune of Puerto Montt. 2nd row: Night panoramic view of downtown Puerto. 3rd row: Monument to Vicente Pérez Rosales, and eruption of the Calbuco volcano from the city. 4th row: On the left, Bell Tower of the Society of Jesus; on the right-top, Church of the Jesuit Fathers; to the right-below, Chinquihue stadium.

- Flag Coat of arms Location of the Puerto Montt commune in Los Lagos Region Location in Chile
- Motto: La ciudad del eterno invierno
- Anthem: Himno Oficial de Puerto Montt
- Interactive map of Puerto Montt
- Coordinates (city): 41°28′S 72°56′W
- Country: Chile
- Region: Los Lagos
- Province: Llanquihue
- Founded as: Melipulli
- Founded: 12 February 1853
- Named for: Manuel Montt

Government
  - Type: Municipality
  - Alcalde: Rodrigo Wainraihgt (RN)

Area
  - Total: 1,673.0 km^{2} (645.9 sq mi)
- Elevation: 14 m (46 ft)

Population (2017 Census)
  - Total: 245,902
  - Density: 146.98/km^{2} (380.68/sq mi)
  - Urban: 220,143
  - Rural: 25,759
- Demonym(s): Puertomontino -a or Melipullian

Sex
  - Men: 121,019
  - Women: 124,883
- Time zone: UTC−4 (CLT)
  - Summer (DST): UTC−3 (CLST)
- Postal code: 5480000
- Area code: 56 + 65
- Climate: Cfb
- Website: Official website (in Spanish)

Puerto Montt (Mapuche: Meli Pulli) is a port city and commune in southern Chile, located at the northern end of the Reloncaví Sound in the Llanquihue Province, Los Lagos Region, 1,055 km to the south of the capital, Santiago. The commune spans an area of 1,673 km^{2} (646 sq mi) and has a population of 245,902 in 2017. It is bounded by the communes of Puerto Varas to the north, Cochamó to the east and southeast, Calbuco to the southwest and Maullín and Los Muermos to the west.

Founded as late as 1853 during the German colonization of southern Chile, Puerto Montt soon outgrew older neighboring cities through its strategic position at the southern end of the Chilean Central Valley being a gateway city into the Chiloé Archipelago, the Llanquihue and Nahuel Huapi lakes and Western Patagonia.

Puerto Montt has gained renown and grown significantly through the rise of Chile to become the second largest salmon producer of the world during the 1990s and 2000s. However, the Chilean salmon aquaculture crisis of the late 2000s resulted in severe unemployment and exposed weaknesses in the local economy. The city's cultural endowment mixes elements of Chilean-Spanish culture with a German heritage. The city has attracted a significant number of newcomers from all over Chile in the last 30 years in search of employment opportunities.

== History ==
Originally, the site was covered by thick forest and was called Melipulli (which means "four hills" in Mapudungun). It was selected as an entrance to Lake Llanquihue when its proximity to the open sea was discovered by the colonial government. The expedition was entrusted to Bernardo Philippi, a German naturalist and cartographer, but after his death in 1851, Vicente Perez Rosales took over his duties, and by the end of September started to chop trees at Reloncaví sound using local woodsman coming from Huar, Maillen, Huelmo and Calbuco Mainly. By December, after the forest was cut down, the area was burned to clear the land in anticipation of completing the settlement plan. The city itself was founded on 12 February 1853, after government-sponsored immigration from Germany that began in 1848 populated the region and integrated it politically to the rest of the country. It was named after Manuel Montt.

In 1912, the city was connected by train to Santiago, making it an important point of entry into Chilean Patagonia and augmenting its commercial development. By 1950, it had a population of 27,500, and the city was rapidly urbanizing. However, the 1960 Valdivia earthquake destroyed much of Puerto Montt, collapsing the port and the train station along with many building and houses. Eventually the city recovered, becoming once again an important urban centre as well as a port of national interest.

=== 1969 violence ===
At the start of March 1969, approximately 90 landless people received (poor advice) from Socialist Member of Parliament Luis Espinoza. The families were never granted land needed to build their homes. On 4 March 1969, the families settled on empty, unoccupied farmland owned by an absentee landlord.

On midnight on 9 March, Espinoza was charged with breaking the law, arrested, and moved to the city of Valdivia, where he was held. Following direct orders from the Minister of Interior Edmundo Pérez Zujovic, 250 armed policemen launched an assault on the squatting families at dawn. Eight squatters were shot dead. Two squatters, a 9-month child and an adult, later died from their wounds. The newly built homes were decimated. The massacre is poignantly memorialized by singer-songwriter Víctor Jara in his song "Preguntas por Puerto Montt".

=== Late 20th century ===
By 1979, Puerto Montt was nominated and later become the Capital of Los Lagos Region, thereby becoming the principal administrative, political and commercial centre of Southern Chile.

== Demographics ==
Historical population
Year	Pop.	±% p.a.
1875	8,397	—
1885	10,549	+2.31%
1895	13,114	+2.20%
1907	19,952	+3.56%
1920	25,375	+1.87%
1930	34,158	+3.02%
1940	44,024	+2.57%
1952	49,487	+0.98%
1970	81,482	+2.81%
1982	103,680	+2.03%
1992	129,970	+2.29%
2002	175,938	+3.07%
2017	245,902	+2.26%
2024	277,040	+1.72%
Source: "Censo de Población y Vivienda". National Statistics Institute.

According to the 2017 census, Puerto Montt has 245,902 inhabitants (121,019 men and 124,883 women), of which 25,759 live in rural areas and 220,143 live in urban areas. From 218,858 inhabitants in the 2012 census, the population grew by 12.36% (27,044 people).

Of the overall population, 55,795 belong to indigenous groups, with 54,394 being Mapuche, 400 Aymara people, 84 Rapa Nui people, 40 Lican Antai, 86 Quechua people, 22 Colla, 222 Diaguita, 71 Kawésqar, 18 Yahgan, 424 other and 34 declaring indigenous status but not identifying a group according to the 2024 census.

About 1.46% of the population (3,595 people) are immigrants, with 199 reporting originating from Peru, 596 from Colombia, 269 from Venezuela, 40 from Bolivia, 1,527 from Argentina, 44 from Haiti, 194 from Ecuador, 157 from South America, 153 from Central America and the Caribbean, 52 from North America, 242 from Europe, 83 from Asia, 16 from Africa, 6 from Oceania and 17 not declaring.

== Climate ==
Puerto Montt has a wet oceanic climate (Köppen: Cfb) with heavy rainfall throughout the year but a drying trend in the summer. Although temperatures are consistently below 25 °C (77 °F), frosts are very rare and occur only a couple of times per month in the winter.

Climate data for Puerto Montt (El Tepual Airport) 1991–2020, extremes 1964–present
Month	Jan	Feb	Mar	Apr	May	Jun	Jul	Aug	Sep	Oct	Nov	Dec	Year
Record high °C (°F)	34.7 (94.5)	35.1 (95.2)	31.6 (88.9)	25.8 (78.4)	20.8 (69.4)	20.0 (68.0)	20.9 (69.6)	19.9 (67.8)	24.2 (75.6)	24.8 (76.6)	28.1 (82.6)	30.4 (86.7)	35.1 (95.2)
Mean daily maximum °C (°F)	20.0 (68.0)	19.9 (67.8)	18.1 (64.6)	15.1 (59.2)	12.9 (55.2)	10.5 (50.9)	10.2 (50.4)	11.2 (52.2)	12.9 (55.2)	14.5 (58.1)	16.5 (61.7)	18.5 (65.3)	15.0 (59.0)
Daily mean °C (°F)	14.3 (57.7)	14.1 (57.4)	12.6 (54.7)	10.4 (50.7)	8.9 (48.0)	7.1 (44.8)	6.4 (43.5)	7.1 (44.8)	8.1 (46.6)	9.6 (49.3)	11.4 (52.5)	13.1 (55.6)	10.3 (50.5)
Mean daily minimum °C (°F)	9.2 (48.6)	8.9 (48.0)	8.1 (46.6)	6.5 (43.7)	5.7 (42.3)	4.4 (39.9)	3.5 (38.3)	3.8 (38.8)	4.1 (39.4)	5.4 (41.7)	6.9 (44.4)	8.3 (46.9)	6.2 (43.2)
Record low °C (°F)	0.8 (33.4)	0.4 (32.7)	−0.8 (30.6)	−3.4 (25.9)	−6.0 (21.2)	−8.1 (17.4)	−7.1 (19.2)	−5.1 (22.8)	−5.4 (22.3)	−2.3 (27.9)	−0.5 (31.1)	−0.3 (31.5)	−8.1 (17.4)
Average precipitation mm (inches)	77.3 (3.04)	69.0 (2.72)	99.3 (3.91)	141.9 (5.59)	181.3 (7.14)	213.4 (8.40)	177.4 (6.98)	174.9 (6.89)	115.5 (4.55)	120.7 (4.75)	102.1 (4.02)	92.8 (3.65)	1,565.6 (61.64)
Average precipitation days (≥ 1.0 mm)	9.7	8.3	11.5	14.3	16.2	19.2	18.0	18.2	15.3	15.1	12.8	11.4	170.0
Average relative humidity (%)	79	80	84	88	91	91	90	88	85	83	81	80	85
Mean monthly sunshine hours	237.6	210.3	169.7	114.7	77.5	53.2	74.5	102.8	131.2	158.8	175.9	207.0	1,713.2
Source 1: Dirección Meteorológica de Chile
Source 2: NOAA (precipitation days 1991–2020)

== Economy ==
Puerto Montt is the capital of the Los Lagos Region and the Llanquihue Province, and the main sea port at the lower end of Chile's western continental land. The city is the principal commercial, services, and financial hub of the Chilean Northern Patagonia—Zona Austral.

Puerto Montt is also the gateway to the Chiloé Archipelago and Chiloé Island across the Chacao Channel, and the many other smaller islands in Chile's inland Sea of Chiloé.

The city's economy is now based upon agriculture, cattle, and forestry on the surrounding islands, and fishing and salmon aquaculture in the fjords and nearby Pacific Ocean.

=== History ===
During the 19th century, before and after the founding of Puerto Montt, the extraction and commercialization of wood, mainly larch, was the main economic activity in the area. Other existing items since the creation of the city were, to a lesser extent, alcohol distilleries, grain oil factories, breweries and the sale of items imported from Germany or Valparaíso. Puerto Montt, as the capital, was vital in the entry and exit of merchandise to the area, since the seaway was the only way to get the products out - the train would only arrive in 1912.

Salmon aquaculture

The city is configured as the hub of one of the largest salmon aquaculture industries in the world. Hatcheries, fisheries and packing plants are mostly located south of Puerto Montt. Fresh salmon is flown daily to world markets and frozen salmon is shipped by ocean to all destinations. The tremendous growth of the region, mainly due to the salmon industry, but also due to rapid expansion of forestry, cattle, and tourism, has proven the massive economic potential of Puerto Montt and its surrounding area.

== International relations ==
The city of Puerto Montt hosts a number of international relations institutions, such as the Regional Unit of International Affairs (URAI) of the Regional Government of Los Lagos, responsible for analyzing and managing the region’s bilateral and multilateral relations with Latin America and the rest of the world; the Tourism and International Relations Commission of the Regional Council of Los Lagos; the regional office of the National Migration Service; the regional office of the General Directorate for Export Promotion (ProChile); the Department of Migration and International Police of the Investigations Police; the Migrant Office, and the International Relations Officer of the Municipality of Puerto Montt.

In the field of higher education internationalization, the main actor in Puerto Montt is the Directorate of International Relations of the University of Los Lagos.

=== Consulates ===
- Germany (Honorary Consulate)
- Argentina (Consulate)
- South Korea (Honorary Consulate)
- Spain (Honorary Vice-Consulate)
- United Kingdom (Honorary Consulate)
- Italy (Honorary Vice-Consulate)
- Netherlands (Honorary Consulate)

== Transport ==
El Tepual Airport is the main commercial airport serving the city. Three airlines operate regular flights to and from Santiago, Punta Arenas, Balmaceda, and Antofagasta. The airlines operating at the airport are LATAM Airlines (the country's largest), Sky Airline and JetSmart. The flight time to Santiago is approximately two hours.

Additionally, Marcel Marchant Aerodrome (La Paloma) connects the city with remote locations within the Patagonian Fjords.

Train services to the city by Empresa de los Ferrocarriles del Estado, after a long absence since the 2000s, returned in 2025 with a local service from Llanquihue to the city's La Paloma Station, with plans to reopen stations to the north in the coming years.

== Administration ==
As a commune, Puerto Montt is a third-level administrative division of Chile administered by a municipal council, headed by an Alcalde with 10 councilors and represented in the Chamber of Deputies by 5 members and in the Senate by 2 people and with support of a Regional Council of 6 members.

The 2024–2028 mayor is Rodrigo Wainraihgt Galilea (RN). The current members of the council are:

- José Segura Díaz (RN)
- Verónica Cárdenas Navarro (RN)
- Yerco Rodríguez Guichapani (UDI)
- Fernando Brinder Álvarez (Ind./UDI)
- Mirta Vega Barría (REP)
- Montserrat Muller Sanhueza (REP)
- Barbara Álvarez Mendez (PPD)
- Barbara Cáceres Martínez (PL)
- Sebastián Almonacid Fuica (PS)
- Evelyn Chávez Chávez (FA)

Within the electoral division of Chile, representatives of Puerto Montt, District 26 (Puerto Montt, Cochamó, Maullín, Calbuco, Castro, Ancud, Quemchi, Dalcahue, Curaco de Vélez, Quinchao, Puqueldón, Chonchi, Queilén, Quellón, Chaitén, Hualaihué, Futaleufú and Palena) in the Chambers of Deputies 2018-2022 are Jenny Álvarez Vera (PS), Gabriel Ascencio Mansilla (PDC), Alejandro Santana Tirachini (RN), Carlos Kuschel Silva (RN) and Alejandro Bernales (Liberal Party). The current Representatives in the Senate period 2014-2022 are Rabindranath Quinteros Lara (PS) and Ivan Moreira Barros (UDI). Regional councilors members 2018-2022 are Ricardo Kuschel Silva (RN), Jaime Brahm Barril (RN), Juan Ortiz Roble (UDI), Manuel Rivera Altamirano (PS), Juan Carcamo Carcamo (PDC) and Valentina Alvarez (Ind/PPD).

== Education ==
Puerto Montt has 175 registered schools varying from educational levels such as pre-school, primary school, secondary school, special school as well as technical-professional and adult schools.

- Arabe Siria School is a Catholic, public school teaching from pre-school to primary school.
- Alerce Rural School is a Catholic, public school from pre-school to primary school with some support to children with special needs.
- Angelmo Elementary School is a public school with education levels from pre-school to primary school with support to children with special needs.
- Adventist Private School is a religious, private and subsidized school owned by Seventh-day Adventist Church Corporation and teach from pre-school to primary school.
- The British School Patagonia is part of Red de colegios Patagonia and a private and subsidized school, from pre-school to secondary school
- Pumahue School, member of Cognita School is a private, non-subsidized school, from pre-school to secondary school.
- Salesiano Padre Jose Fernández Perez, is a Catholic, private and subsided school, that ranging from pre-school to secondary school with support to children with special needs, as well as technical and adults school.
- Deutsche Schule (German Institute) of Puerto Montt is a private, non-subsidized school member of DS CHILE "Association of German schools in Chile" with an international exchange and support from Germany, teaching from pre-school to secondary school.
- Industrial Lyceum of Puerto Montt is a public, secondary school with a focus on technical professions.
- Lafquen Montessori School, Known to use Montessori method is a private and subsidized school, from pre-school to secondary-school with support to children with special needs.
- Mother Isabel Larragaña Adult school is a Catholic and Private school with a primary and secondary school program for adults.
- Joaquin de los Andes Auditory and Language Special School is an holistic, private and subsidized school for pre-school children with SLI and Deafness.

Universities

- Universidad de Los Lagos, Campus Puerto Montt (Chinquihue)
- Universidad Austral de Chile (UACh), Campus Puerto Montt
- Universidad San Sebastián, Campus Patagonia
- Universidad Santo Tomás, Campus Puerto Montt

== Notable people ==
- Bordemar, group of folkloric music.
- Raúl Ruiz, filmmaker.
- Enrique Paris, physician and politician who served as Minister of Health of Chile between 2020 and 2022.
- María Luisa Cordero, television presenter and psychiatrist.
- Rodolfo Stange, police officer (general director), politician and former senator, member of the Government Junta during the Military Dictatorship of Chile.

== Gallery ==
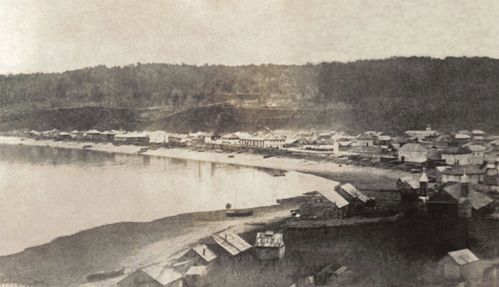
The city of Puerto Montt in 1862.

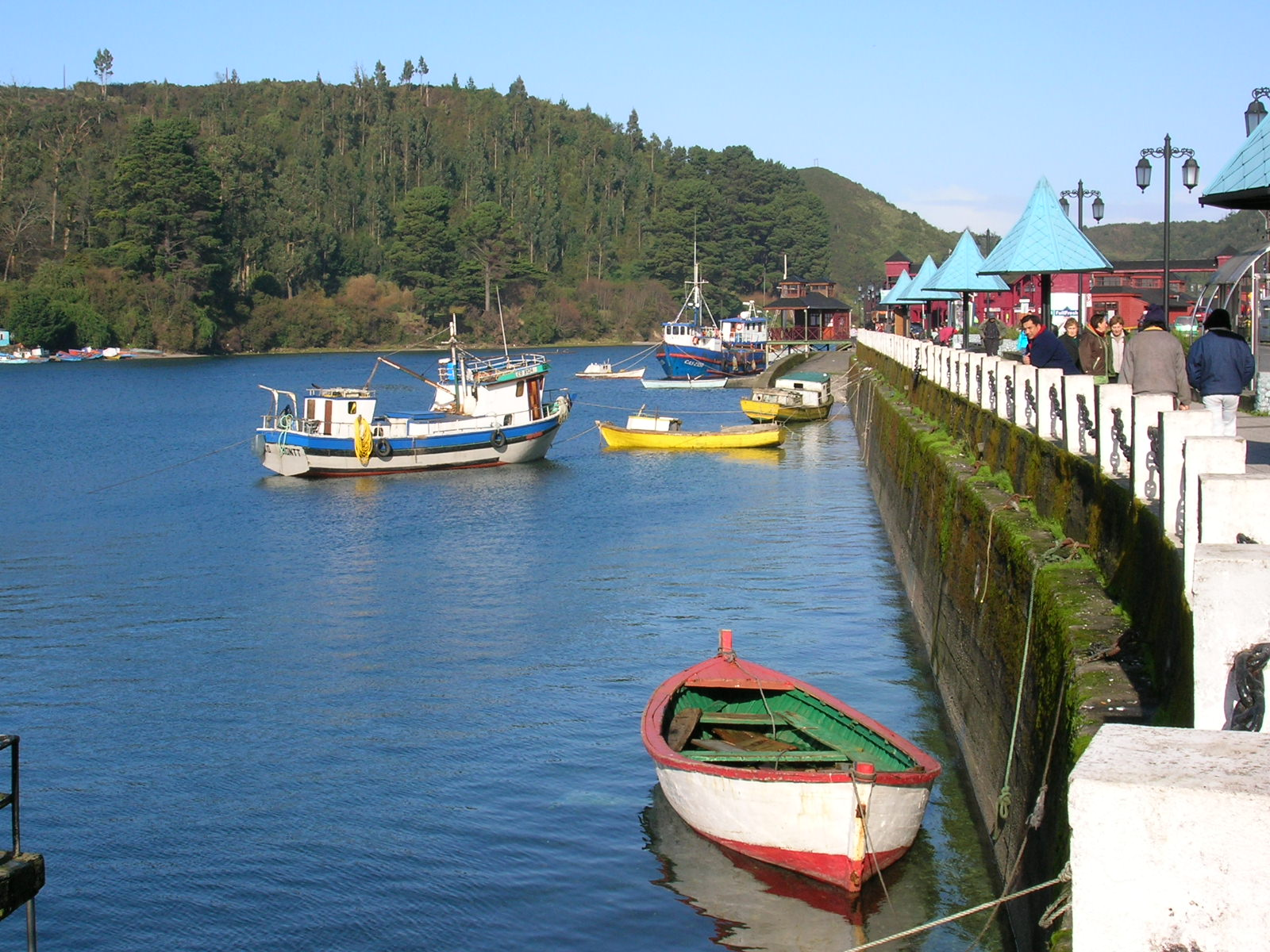
Angelmó.

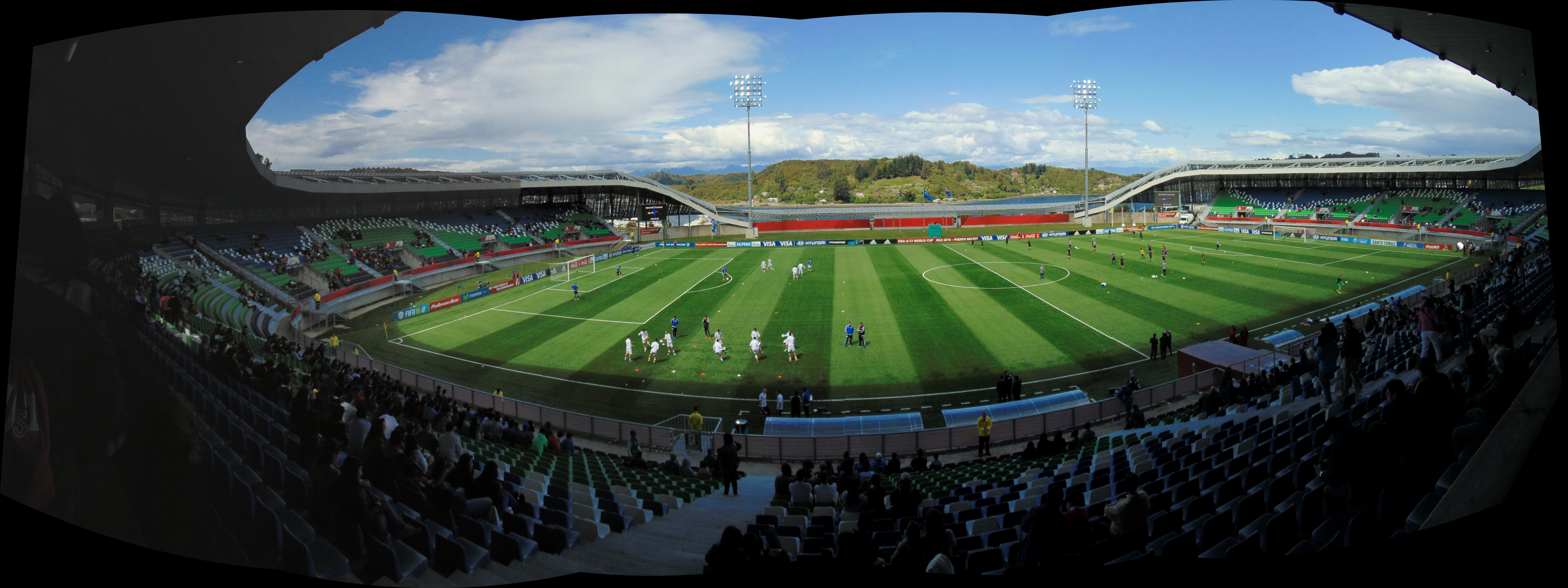
Chinquihue Stadium.

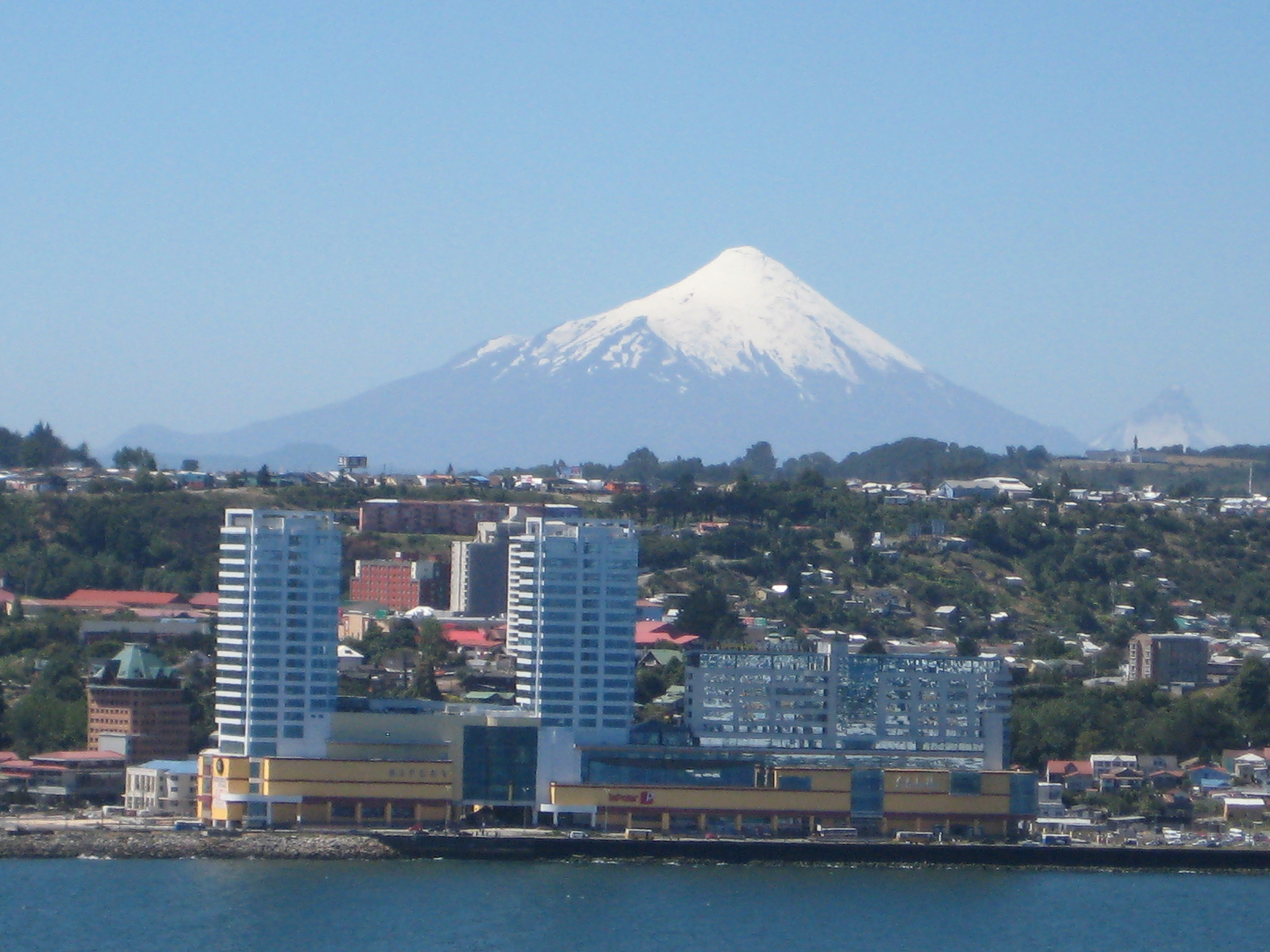
View of Puerto Montt's sea-side downtown in foreground and Osorno volcano in the background.

== See also ==
- Tenglo Island
