= Calbuco =

- City and Commune
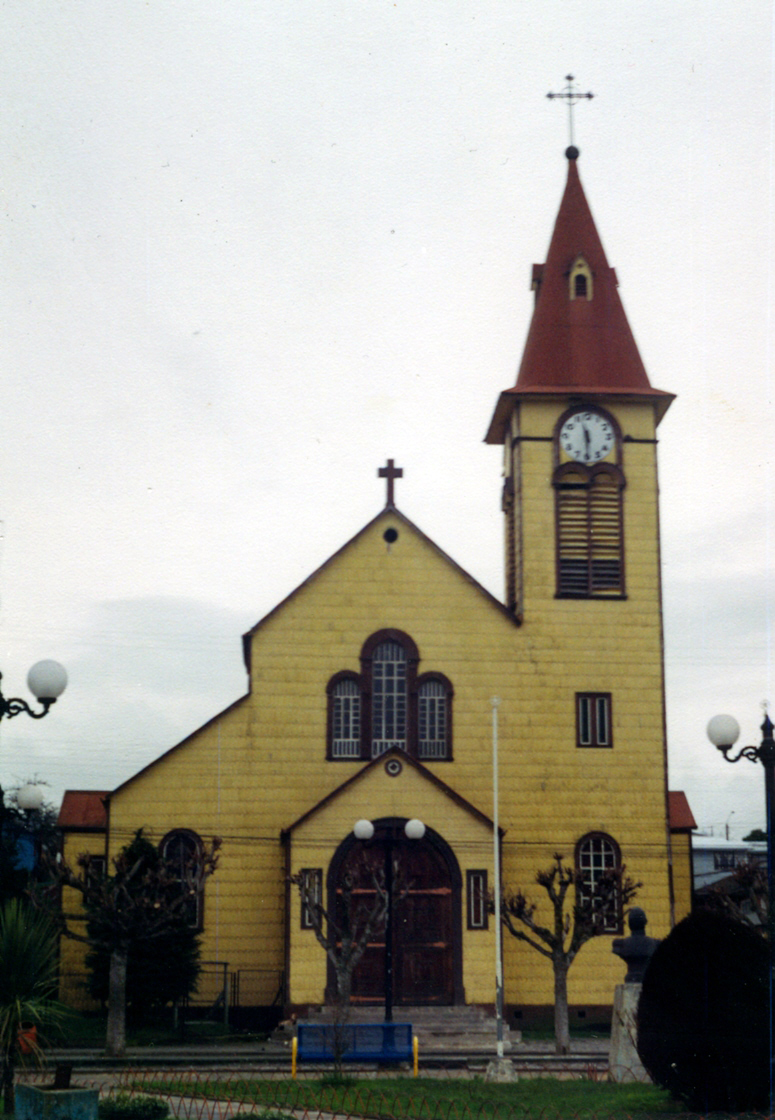
- San Miguel Arcangel de Calbuco

- Flag Coat of arms Location of the commune of Calbuco in Los Lagos Region Location in Chile
- Coordinates: 41°46′S 73°08′W
- Country: Chile
- Region: Los Lagos
- Province: Llanquihue
- Founded as: Fuerte San Miguel de Calbuco
- Founded: May, 1603

Government
  - Type: Municipality
  - Alcalde: Rubén Cárdenas Gómez (PRSD)

Area
  - Total: 590.8 km^{2} (228.1 sq mi)
- Elevation: 7 m (23 ft)

Population (2012 Census)
  - Total: 32,963
  - Density: 55.79/km^{2} (144.5/sq mi)
  - Urban: 12,165
  - Rural: 18,905

Sex
  - Men: 15,906
  - Women: 15,164
- Time zone: UTC−4 (CLT)
  - Summer (DST): UTC−3 (CLST)
- Area code: 56 + 65
- Climate: Cfb
- Website: Municipality of Calbuco

Calbuco is a city and commune in southern Chile administered by the Municipality of Calbuco. Administratively Calbuco belongs to the Llanquihue Province of Los Lagos Region. The origin of the city was the Spanish Fort Calbuco founded in 1603, and became later an important fish market. The archaeological site of Monte Verde lies within the commune.

Calbuco Island is part of the commune and contains the city of Calbuco. There are thirteen other islands in the commune: Huar, Puluqui, Chidhuapi, Tabón, Mayelhue, Lín, Quenu, Quihua, Huapi Abtao, Chaullín, Caicué o lagartija, Tautil and Queullín.

== History ==
The settlement of Calbuco grew out of the fort Fuerte San Miguel de Calbuco which was founded in 1603 by Francisco Hernández Ortiz-Pizarro.

Calbuco was the capital of Calbuco Department, Chiloé between 1834 and 1855, and of Carelmapu Department between 1855 and 1928. It was capital of Calbuco Department, Llanquihue between 1937 and 1975.

== Demographics ==
Historical population
Year	Pop.	±% p.a.
1875	8,877	—
1885	10,392	+1.59%
1895	11,092	+0.65%
1907	13,147	+1.43%
1920	13,348	+0.12%
1930	15,109	+1.25%
1940	16,405	+0.83%
1952	17,651	+0.61%
1970	22,133	+1.27%
1982	23,965	+0.66%
1992	27,027	+1.21%
2002	31,070	+1.40%
2017	33,985	+0.60%
2024	36,474	+1.01%
Source: "Censo de Población y Vivienda". National Statistics Institute.

According to the 2002 census of the National Statistics Institute, Calbuco spans an area of 590.8 km^{2} (228 sq mi) and has 31,070 inhabitants (15,906 men and 15,164 women). Of these, 12,165 (39.2%) lived in urban areas and 18,905 (60.8%) in rural areas. The population grew by 15% (4,043 persons) between the 1992 and 2002 censuses.

=== Settlements ===
Besides the town of Calbuco, Calbuco Comuna is also home to the settlements of: Pargua, Puluqui Island, San Rafael and Texas. The town of San Rafael is across the estuary from the town of Calbuco. Texas was a refugee camp built after the 1960 earthquake on the outskirts of San Rafael; it has become semi-permanent. Pargua is the ferry port and gateway to the Chiloé Archipelago and the big island of Chiloé. Pargua was considered rural until the 2002 census, and the 800+ people on Puluqui Island are still denominated as "rural" although clustered around the bay where the daily barge docks.

== Administrative divisions ==
Calbuco Comuna is divided into twenty districts. Calbuco is the most populous with the highest population density, while Río Tambor is the largest at 141.1 square kilometres (54.5 sq mi) and has the lowest density. Alfaro, Quenu, Puluqui, Challahue, Machildad, Chucahua, Quetrolauquén, Aguantao, Huayún and Río Tambor are more sparsely populated, further away from the towns of Calbuco and San Rafael.

- Aguantao
- Alfaro
- Calbuco
- Caicaén
- Challahue
- Chechil
- Chidguapi
- Chucahue
- El Rosario
- Guayún
- Llaicha
- Machildad
- Puluqui
- Quenu
- Quetrulauquén
- Queullin
- Río Tambor
- San José de Quigua
- San Rafael
- Tabón

== Administration ==
As a commune, Calbuco is a third-level administrative division of Chile administered by a municipal council, headed by an alcalde who is directly elected every four years. The alcalde is Rubén Cárdenas Gómez (PRSD), and the council has the following members:

- Pedro Yáñez Uribe (PRI)
- Juan Francisco Calbucoy Guerrero (PS)
- Oscar González Almonacid (PS)
- Sergio García Alvarez (Ind-UDI)
- Iván Vásquez Gómez (PRSD)
- Manuel Oyarzo Barría (PRO)

Within the electoral divisions of Chile, Calbuco is represented in the Chamber of Deputies by Marisol Turres (UDI) and Patricio Vallespín (PDC) as part of the 57th electoral district, together with Puerto Montt, Cochamó and Maullín. The commune is represented in the Senate by Camilo Escalona Medina (PS) and Carlos Kuschel Silva (RN) as part of the 17th senatorial constituency (Los Lagos Region).
