= Alacaluf =

Alacaluf may refer to:

- Alacalufe people or Kawésqar, a South American people living in the Chilean Patagonia
- Alacaluf language or Kawésqar, their language
