= Alberto Achacaz Walakial =

Native Chilean

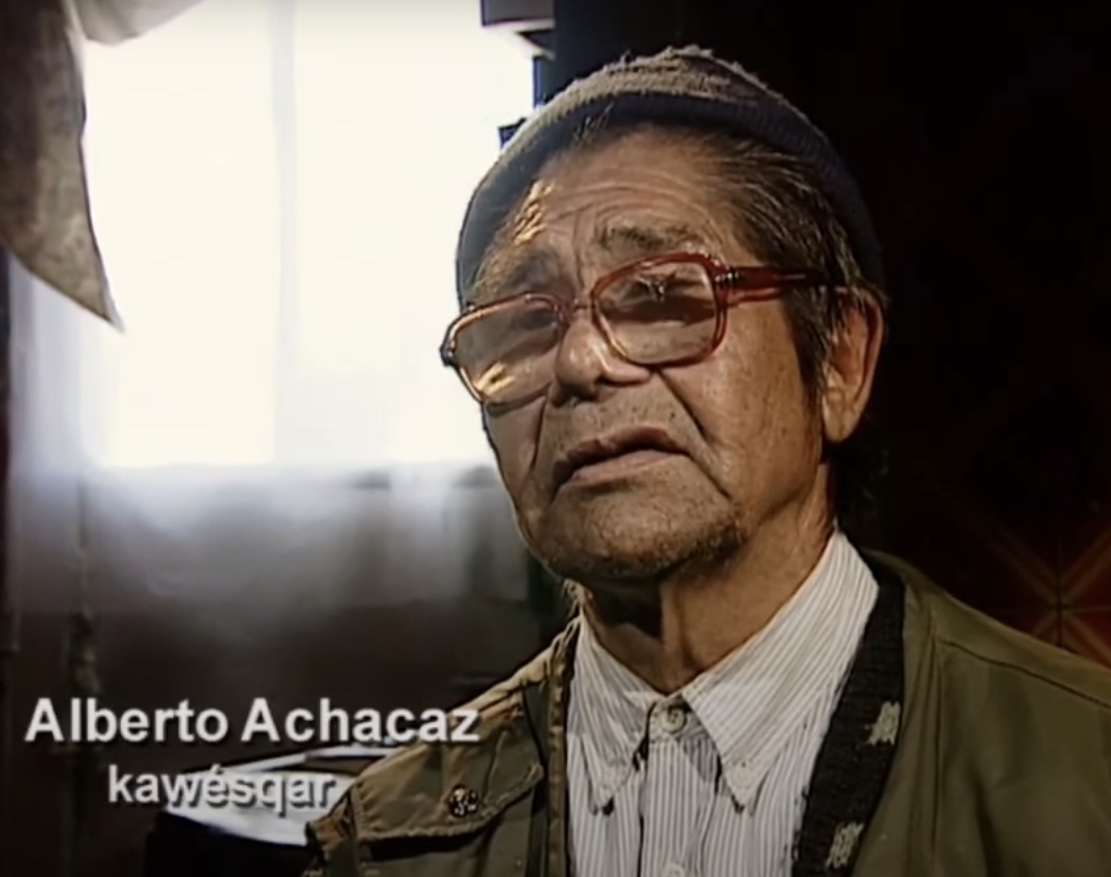
Alberto Achacaz Walakial

Alberto Achacaz Walakial (1929? – 4 August 2008) was a Chilean citizen and one of the last full-blooded Kaweskars, who are also known as the Alacaluf, or Halakwulup. The Kaweskar are an indigenous Native American people who were once found in coastal regions of Chilean Patagonia. There are estimated to be only approximately a dozen full-blooded Kaweskars still living following Achacaz's death in 2008. However, there are no Kaweskar women of fertile age remaining, so the tribe appears to be headed for extinction.

Achacaz lived in a modest home, which lacked a modern drainage system. He had lived alone since his wife died in 1999. He earned a living by crafting small canoes out of sea lion skins and weaving traditional baskets.

Achacaz had been hospitalized in Punta Arenas, Chile since late June 2008. Achacaz had arrived at the hospital malnourished, dehydrated and weighing less than 130 pounds. He was admitted to the intensive care unit of the Hospital Naval. Additionally, Achacaz was found to be suffering from septic shock which affected his gall bladder and lungs.

Alberto Achacaz Walakial died of blood poisoning at the hospital in Punta Arenas on 4 August 2008, according to reports by the local Chilean newspaper, La Prensa Austral. Official Chilean government documents listed Achacaz's age at 79 years old. However, some believed that Achacaz was closer to 90 years of age.

== Background of the Kaweskar ==
The Kaweskars were known as the "Nomads of the Sea." They are also known as the Alacaluf. Traditionally, the Kaweskar lived aboard their canoes within the channels of southern Patagonia. They were nomadic hunter-gatherers whose diet consisted of sea birds and seafood. It is believed that their nomadic way of life may have stretched back 6,000 years.

The Kaweskars did not establish semi-permanent settlements on dry land until the middle of the 20th century. They settled in and around the hamlet of Villa Puerto Edén on Wellington Island.

The Kaweskars are facing cultural extinction as a distinct group as their surviving, full-blooded members grow older. Since the arrival of Europeans, Chile has lost five of its original fourteen indigenous tribes.
