= Central Alacaluf language =

Extinct Alacalufan language

Central Alacaluf
- Alacaluf, Alacalufe-Central
- Native to: Chile
- Region: "The Cone"
- Extinct: early 20th century
- Language family: Alacalufan: Central Alacaluf
- Dialects: Guaicaro

Language codes
- ISO 639-3: None (mis)
- Glottolog: alac1240

Central Аlacaluf (Alacaluf, Southern Alacaluf, Alacalufe-Central) is an extinct Alacalufan language, formerly spoken in Chile, and distinct from Kawésqar proper. It is documented through wordlists up to 1928. Guaicaro is thought to have been a dialect.

== Vocabulary ==
Gloss	Alacaluf	Kawésqar
man	accheleche	aḳsenes
woman	accheletep	esatap
head	yacabedchepy	tes-ḳʰar
hair	tereaf	eyoḳ
forehead	arcacol	tes-tes
eyes	titche	tes
nose	loutche	nows
cheek	cheltefare	ḳseȼepe
eyebrows	tichery	tes-eyoḳ
mouth	afflet	af-ḳstay
tongue	paileaf	ḳalaḳtes
teeth	cherecdye	sereḳte
