= Kawesqaran languages =

Language family of South America

Alacalufan
- Kawesqaran
- Geographic distribution: Chile
- Ethnicity: Alacaluf people
- Linguistic classification: One of the world's primary language families
- Subdivisions: Kawesqar; Central Alacaluf †; Southern Alacaluf †; ?Guaicaro †

Language codes
- ISO 639-5: aqa
- Glottolog: kawe1237

The Alacalufan languages or Kawesqaran languages are a small language family of South America. They have not been definitely linked to any other American language family.

== Languages ==
Early vocabularies show that Alakaluf was three languages, with an extinct Southern Alakaluf (vocabularies in Fitz-Roy 1839 and Hyades & Deniker 1891) and Central Alakaluf (vocabularies in Borgatello 1928, Marcel 1892, and Skottsberg 1913) in addition to the critically endangered northern variety, Kawésqar.

Based on alleged toponymic evidence, a purported Kakauhua language has sometimes been included in the Alacalufan family.

Guaicaro may have been a dialect of Central Alakaluf or Kawesqar.

=== Mason (1950) ===
Mason (1950) lists:

- Caucawe (Kaukahue, etc.)
- Enoo (Peshera)
- Lecheyel
- Yekinawe (Yequinahuere, etc.)
- Adwipliin
- Alikulip, Alakaluf, etc.
- Calen
- Taijatof

Chono, Caraica (Karaika), and Poya may also belong.
