= Margarita Vargas López =

Chilean Kawésqar politician

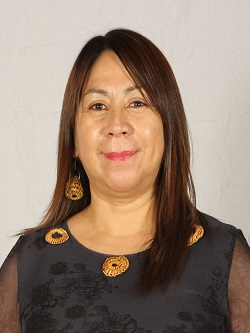
- Margarita Vargas López

Member of the Constitutional Convention of Chile
- In office July 4, 2021 – July 4, 2022
- Preceded by: office established
- Succeeded by: office abolished
- Constituency: Kawésqar at-large

Personal details
- Born: Margarita Virginia Vargas López; October 30, 1969 (age 56) Villa Puerto Edén, Chile
- Occupation: Politician

Margarita Virginia Vargas López (born 30 October 1969) is a Chilean politician of Kawésqar origin. In 2021, she was elected to serve as the so-called Kawésqar nation's representative in the Constitutional Convention. Outside of politics, Vargas is a social activist and academic who has written for El Mostrador.

== Early life and family background ==
Vargas was born in the isolated community of Villa Puerto Edén in the Última Esperanza Province. Villa Puerto Edén, which is known as Jetarkte to the Kawésqar people, is the homeland of the Kawésqar people. As a child, Vargas and her family lived in a nomadic lifestyle, sailing across Wellington Island and surrounding areas. From a young age, Vargas identified strongly with her indigenous heritage, taking pride in her Kawésqar background "even though they made fun of us when we were children".

At the age of 10, Vargas moved to the southern city of Punta Arenas in pursuit of an education. Vargas attests that the Chilean military dictatorship harmed the Kawésqar people by forcing members of the nation to disperse from their ancestral territories. Vargas stated that the forced assimilation of Indigenous Chileans resulted in a situation in which "[w]e inserted ourselves into a western world that did not understand us."

Vargas's late grandmother, Margarita Molinari Edén, was a Kawésqar activist who sought the legal preservation of Kawésqar culture. Following Molinari's death in November 1999, Vargas expressed her fear that the traditional Kawésqar culture would die with her:

"The Kawésqar people are leaving with her, because she was the only person who maintained the customs and traditions of her people"

== Kawésqar advocacy ==
Vargas continued her grandmother's advocacy to have a collection of Kawésqar cultural works compiled in 1971 receive state protection. However, in 2018, the Court of Appeals of Punta Arenas denied Vargas' request. The aforementioned legal battle was noted in a 2020 paper published by the University of Chile, which cited its unsuccessful conclusion as an example of the "impossibility of precautionary guardianship" present in Chilean civil law.

Vargas worked closely with the Office of Indigenous Affairs in the Magallanes Region to establish legal protections for Kawésqar communities on Villa Puerto Edén, Punta Arenas, as well as Puerto Natales. She additionally worked to secure protections for the Yaghan people, an indigenous nation native to Navarino Island.

== Political career ==
In the 2021 Chilean Constitutional Convention election, Vargas ran to represent the Kawésqar people, who are reserved a seat on the body. She was elected to the body, and took office on 4 July 2021.

Vargas has criticized fishing policies implemented by the Chilean government, which she argues fail to account for the maritime traditions of indigenous nations. Vargas has spoken in favor of gender parity in government, noting that the Kawésqar culture has historically emphasized equal roles for genders in daily life. Vargas has advocated for indigenous unity, proposing that the Kawésqar people ally with the Yaghan and Selkʼnam nations in particular to advance the collective goal of self-determination.
