= Guaicaro language =

Extinct language of Patagonia, Chile

Guaicaro
- Native to: Chile
- Region: Brunswick Peninsula
- Ethnicity: Guaicaro people
- Era: primarily attested mid 19th century, but seems it may have survived well into the 20th
- Language family: unclassified (Alacalufan?)

Language codes
- ISO 639-3: None (mis)
- Glottolog: guai1246

Guaicaro (Guaïcaro) is an extinct, unclassified language of Patagonia known only from a 19-word list and personal names.

The Guaicaro people apparently lived on the Brunswick Peninsula, bordering the Tehuelche to their northeast in around Laguna Blanca.

The Guaicaros (also rendered Guaïkaros, Guaicurúes, Huacurúes) were apparently the same people known as the Huemules (Güemules) and Supalios.

== Classification ==
It is only known from personal names and a list of 19 words elicited using gestures from the last documented speaker, a medicine man living among the Tehuelche, and published in 1896. Most of the words can be explained as Central Alacaluf or Tawókser (or both), though mer 'arm' appears to come from Chon.

== Vocabulary ==
Word list of Guaicaro documented by Ramón Lista (1896):

Spanish gloss	English gloss	Guaicaro
fuego	fire	charcuish
viento	wind	lefeskar
nube	cloud	arkayeta
hombre	man	pellieri
mujer	woman	esnatun
ojos	eyes	têl ó téel
boca	mouth	asfjestail
nariz	nose	huicharek
cabeza	head	hurkúar
perro	dog	shalki
pescado	fish	yaulchel
leña	firewood	kekásh
mano	hand	teregua
dedo	finger	fol karjk
brazo	arm	merr
dientes	teeth	lefeskar
pelo	hair	tercóf
cantar	sing	lektan
llorar	cry	etkastal
