= Puerto Edén Igneous and Metamorphic Complex =

- Stratigraphic range: Late Jurassic
- Type: Complex

Lithology
- Primary: Metamorphic rocks, migmatite, plutonic rocks, gneiss

Location
- Coordinates: 49.139°S 74.453°W
- Region: Magallanes Region
- Country: Chile

Type section
- Named for: Puerto Edén

The Puerto Edén Igneous and Metamorphic Complex is a large coherent but varied geologic complex of metamorphic and igneous rocks that crops out in the Fjords and channels of Chile of the Magallanes Region. The rocks of the complex include migmatites, plutonic rocks and high-grade metamorphic rocks. To the west the Puerto Edén Igneous and Metamorphic Complex bounds the South Patagonian Batholith. Mineralogical observations and geothermobarometric calculations indicate high-temperature and low-pressure conditions (ca. 600 to 700 °C (1,112 to 1,292 °F) and 3 to 4.5 kbar) for an event of metamorphism and partial melting of metapelites in the Late Jurassic (previously determined by SHRIMP U–Pb zircon ages).
