= Navimag =

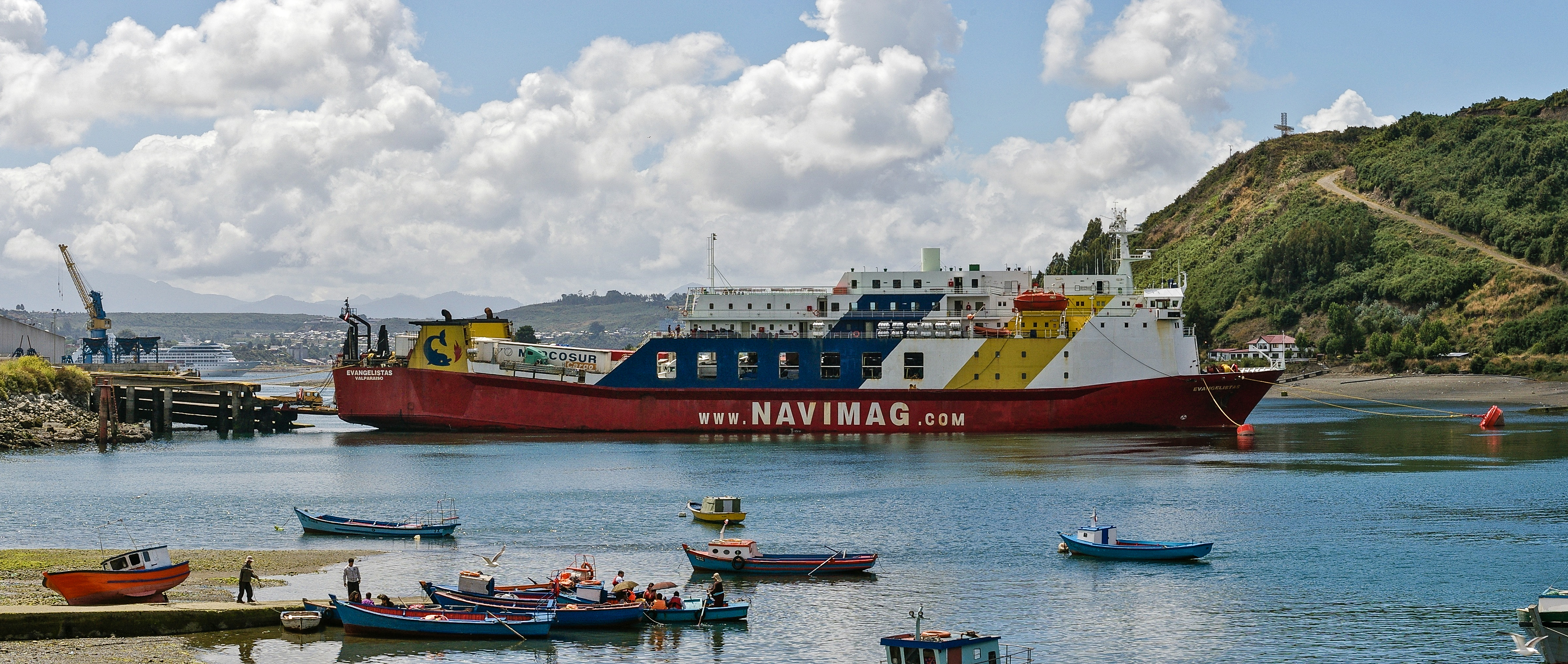
Navimag ferry, MV Evangelistas, in Puerto Montt, Chile

Navimag (Naviera Magallanes S.A.) is a ferry operator in Chile. The company operates two routes carrying passengers and vehicles:

- Puerto Montt to Puerto Natales, calling at Puerto Eden (a 4-day journey)
- Puerto Montt to Puerto Chacabuco

The company was formed in 1979, when cargo services between Puerto Montt and Punta Arenas were started. Passenger services to Puerto Natales and Laguna San Rafael were added in 1985.

In 2000 the Magallanes joined the fleet second hand. Built in 1977/78 in Japan, she was renamed Evangelistas in 2007. During her two-decades long career with Navimag she spent most of her time on the route to Puerto Natales. After her replacement 2020 by the Esperanza she was scrapped in India.

The Puerto Edén was used principally to Chacabuco.

In late 2009 Amadeo 1 joined the fleet and early 2014 Navimag began operating the Edén along Amadeo 1 as operational Ro-ro ferries to Puerto Natales.

On August 18, 2014 en route to Puerto Natales, Navimag ferry Amadeo 1, struck a rock in the Kirke Channel near Puerto Natales. The collision caused a starboard breach of the hull and the ship took on water. Amadeo 1 capsized in the shallow water, with most of the ship lying above the water line.

During the following year, Navimag determined that the ship was not salvageable. With the assistance of the Armada de Chile, the Amadeo 1 was scuttled in 2,700-meter-deep waters off Diego de Almagro Island, Chile on September 21, 2015.

In 2016, Navimag purchased the Trinidad I to join Evangelistas on the Puerto Montt route while Edén took over the service to Chacabuco.

In 2020, the Chinese-built Esperanza entered service, replacing Evangelistas. This new passenger-freight ferry will carry up 244 passengers along with vehicles at a maximum speed of 13 knots.

== Navimag Ferries ==
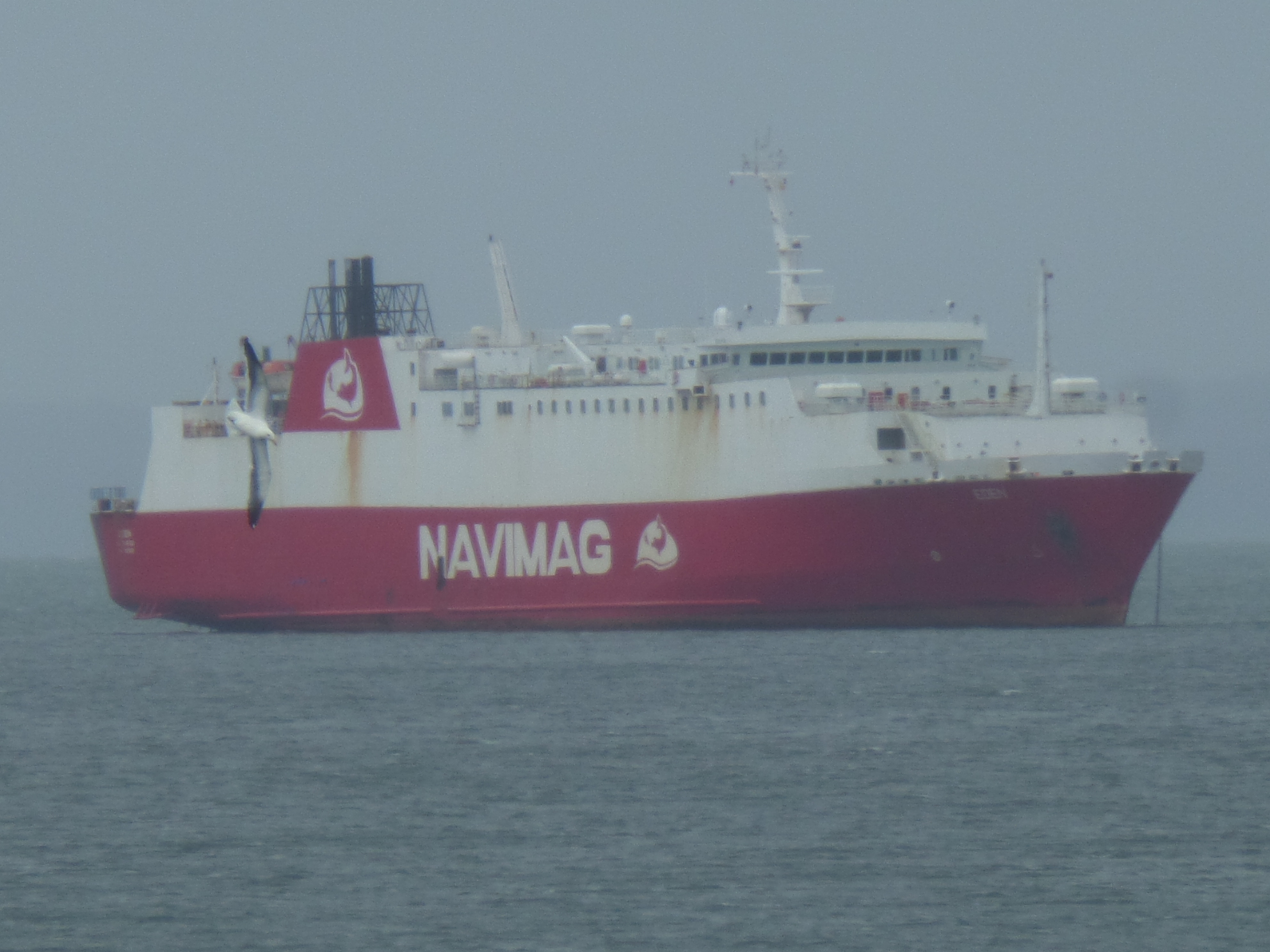
Ferry Eden in Puerto Montt

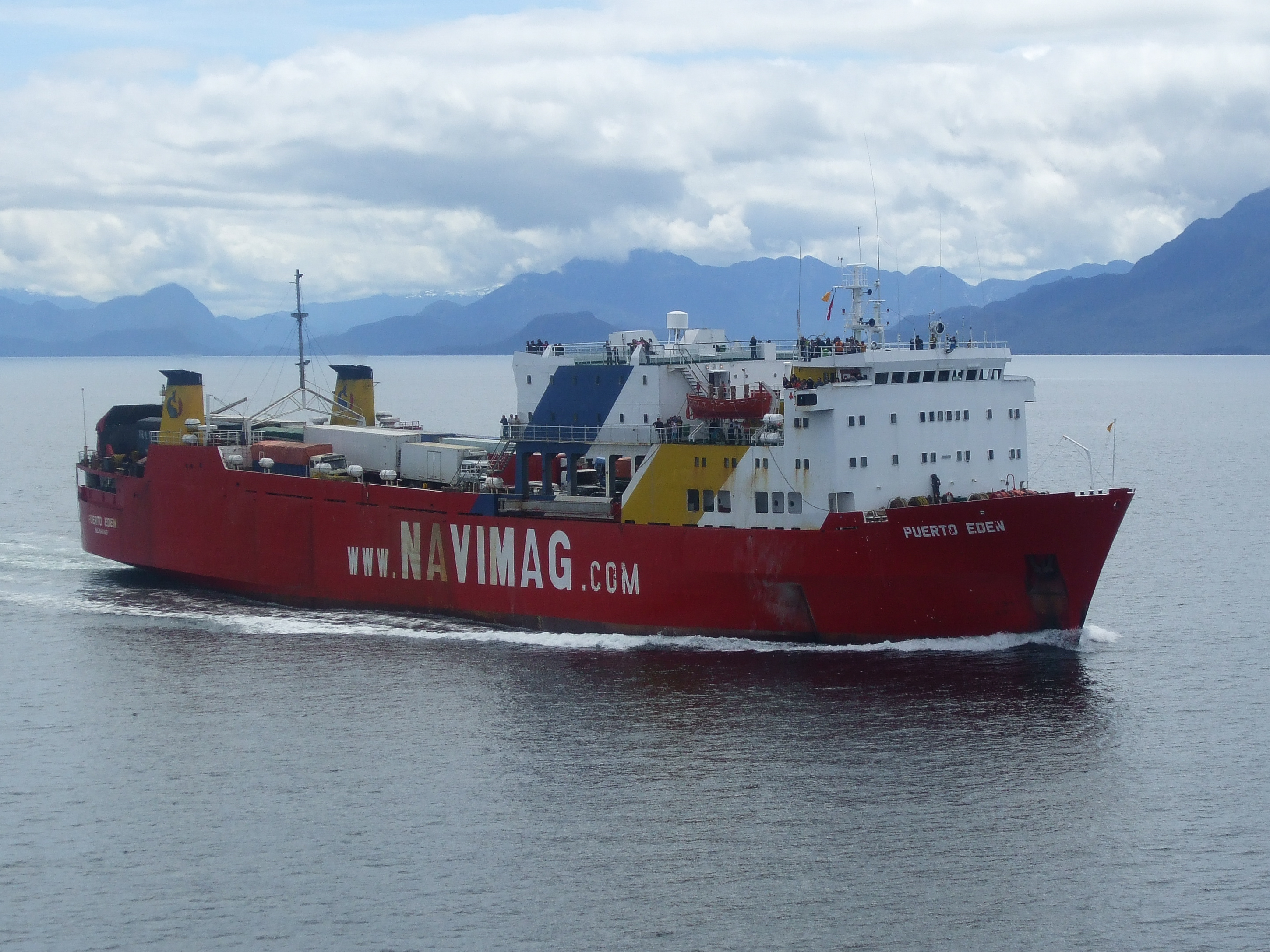
MV Puerto Edén in the Moraleda Canal

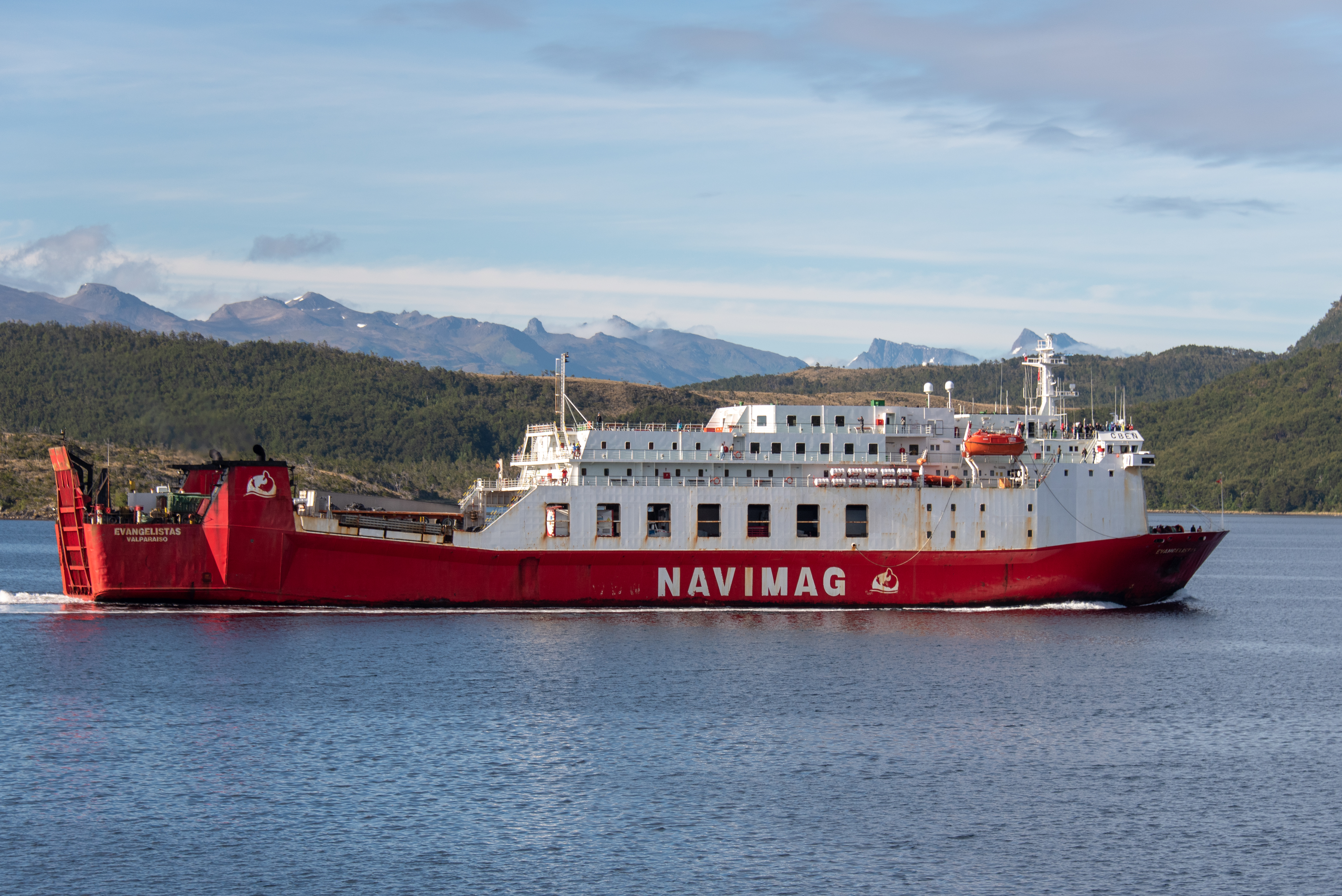
MV Evangelistas heading into the Kirke Narrows near Puerto Natales

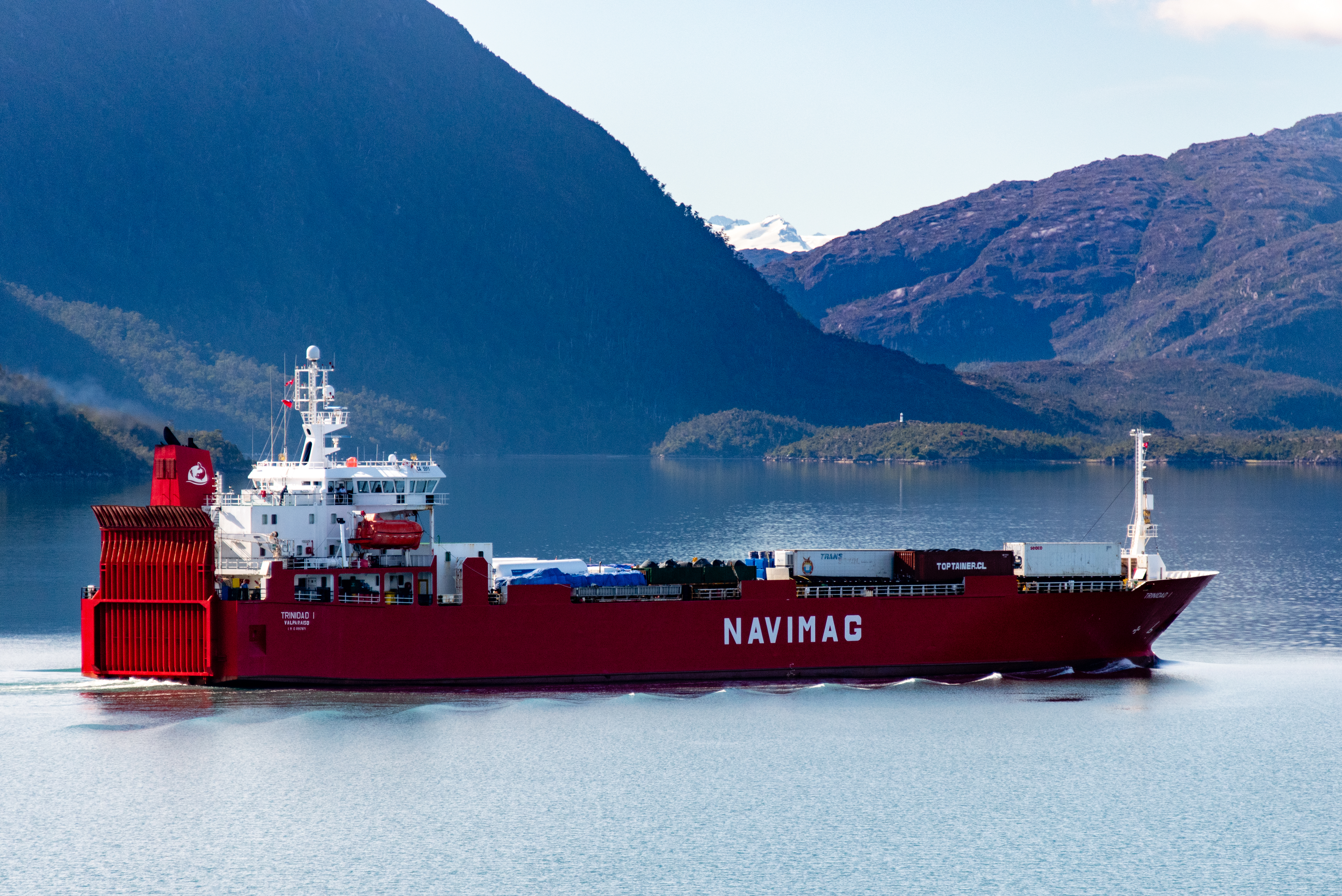
MV Trinidad 1, entering English Narrows, north of Puerto Edén

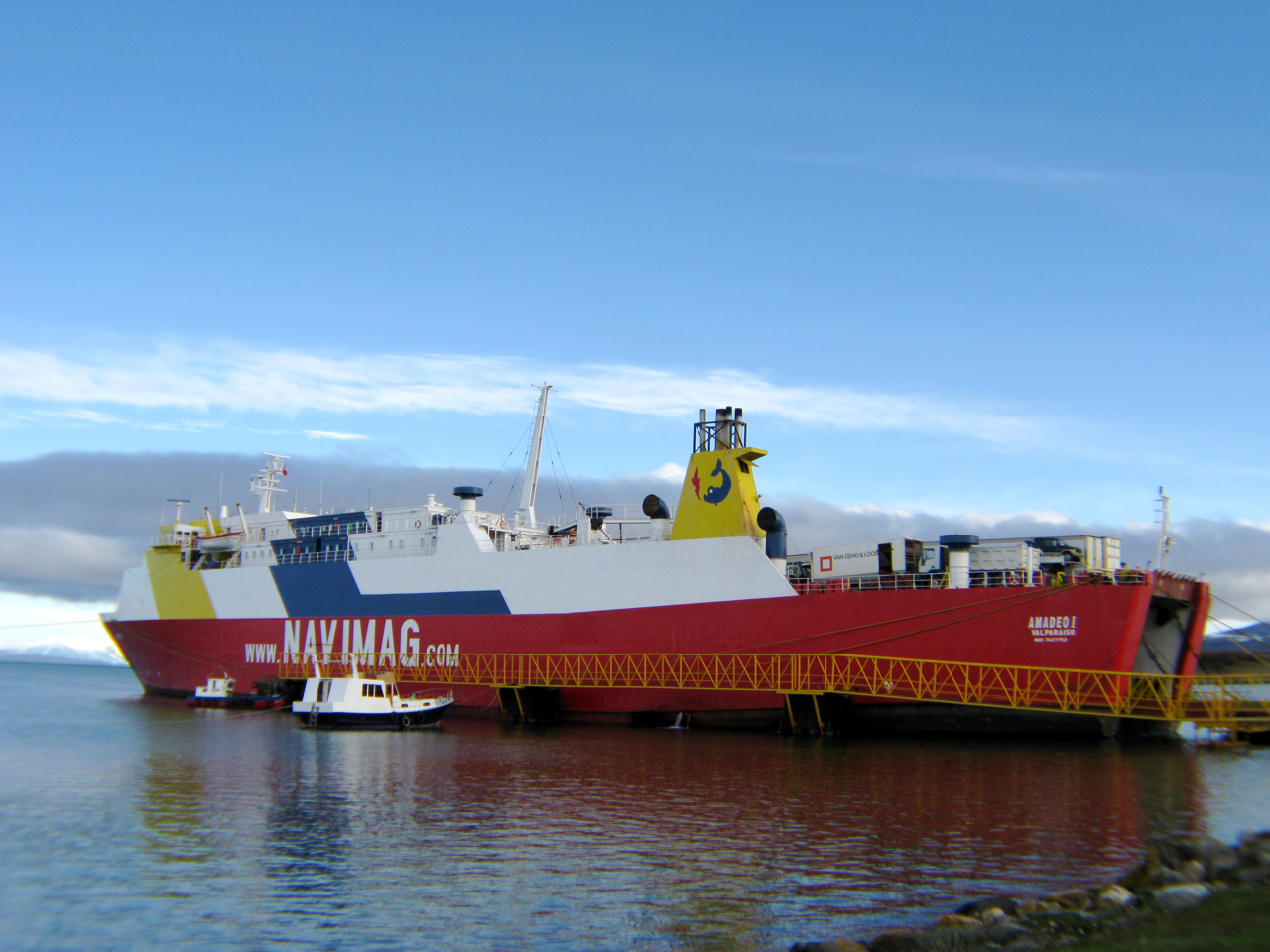
MV Amadeo I, at the dock in Puerto Natales

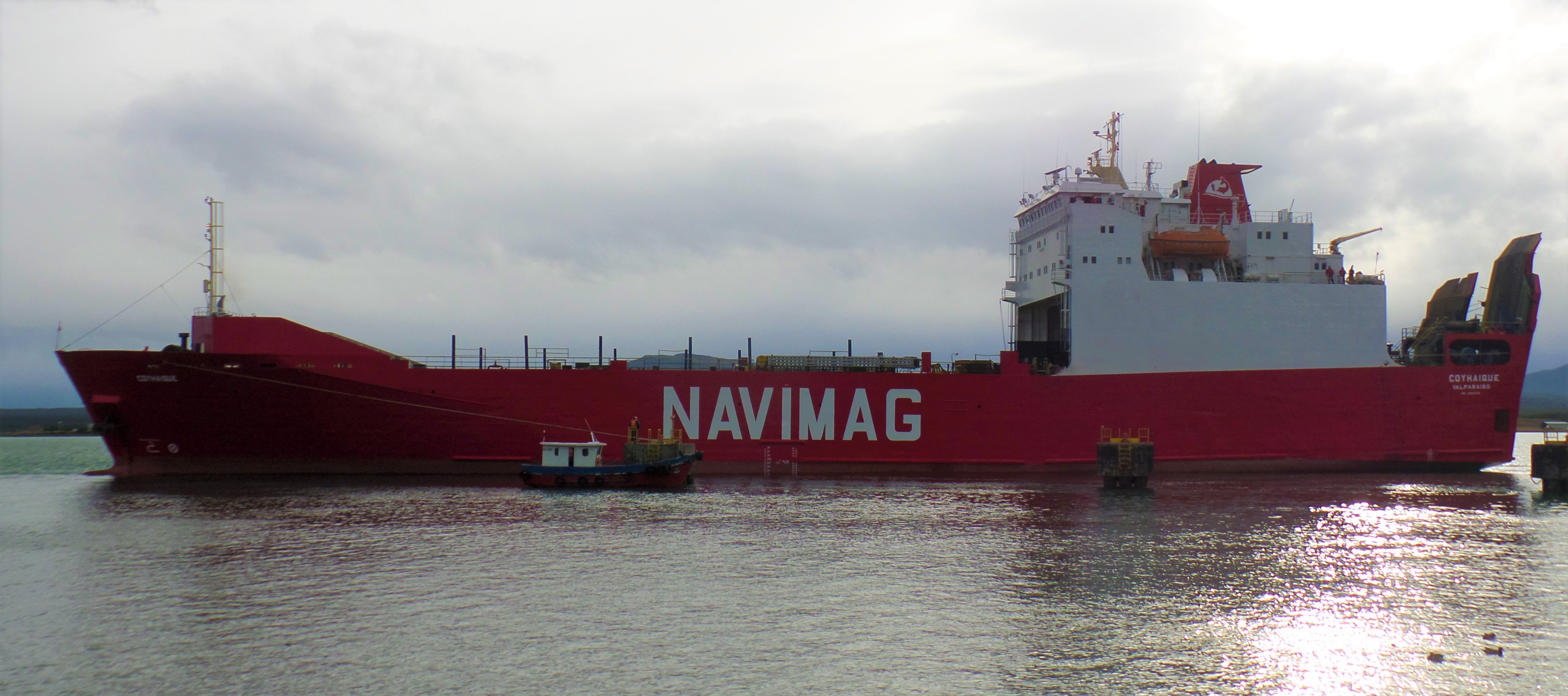
MV Coyhaique in Puerto Natales

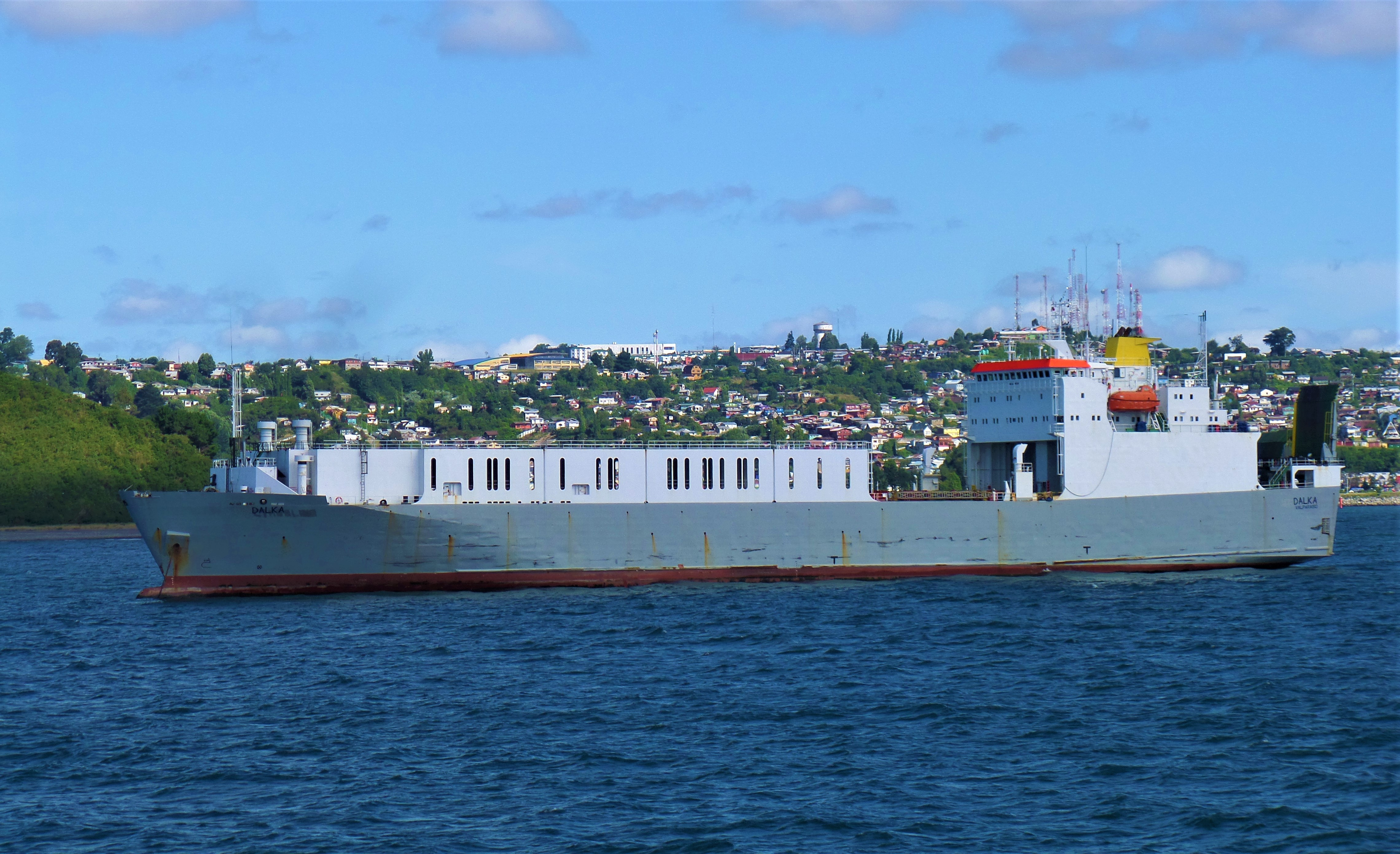
MV Dalka in Puerto Montt

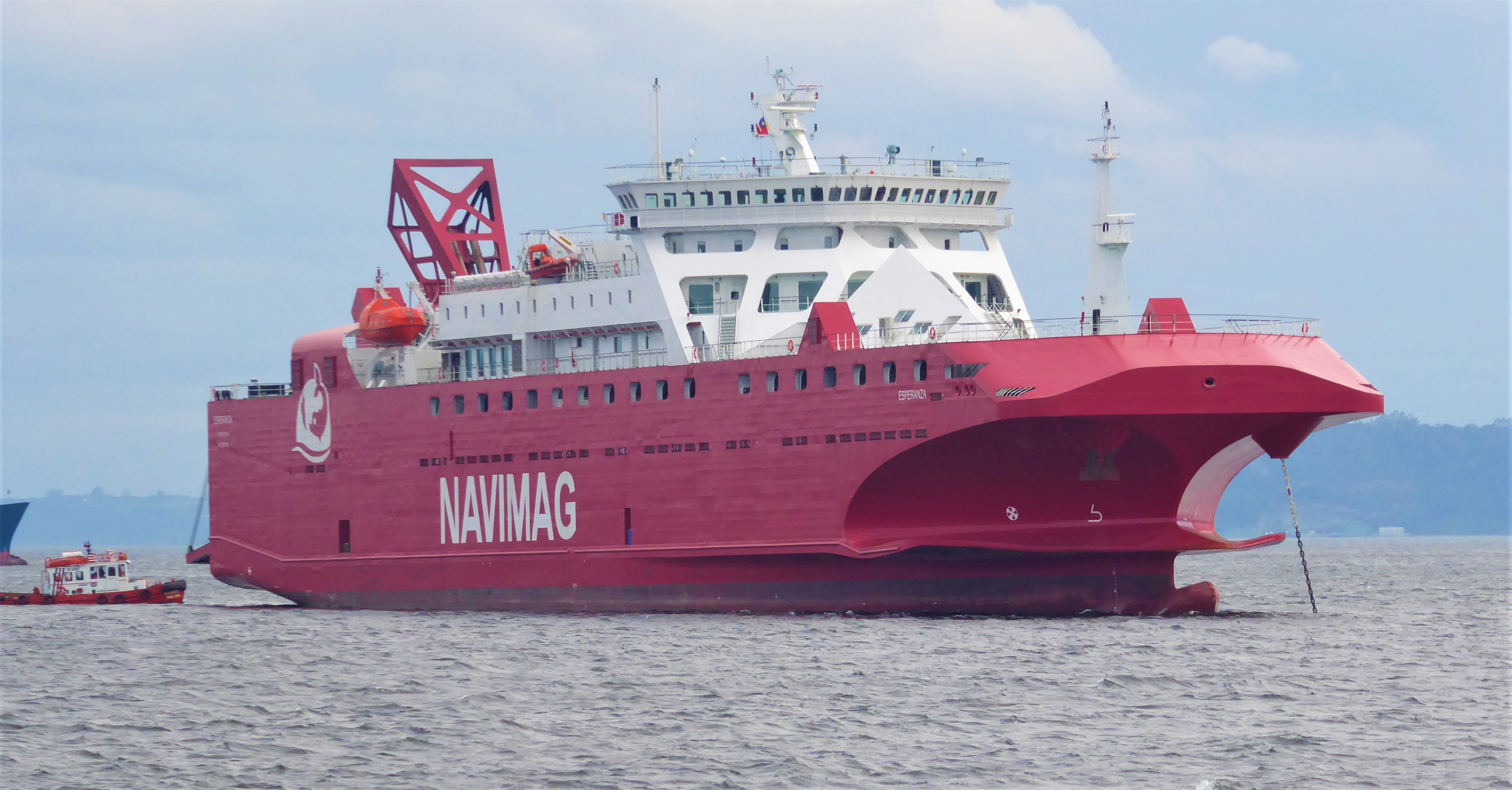
M/V Esperanza in Puerto Montt
