= Villa Puerto Edén =

Minor port in Natales, Magallanes Region, Chile

Villa Puerto Edén Jetarktétqal (Kawésqar)
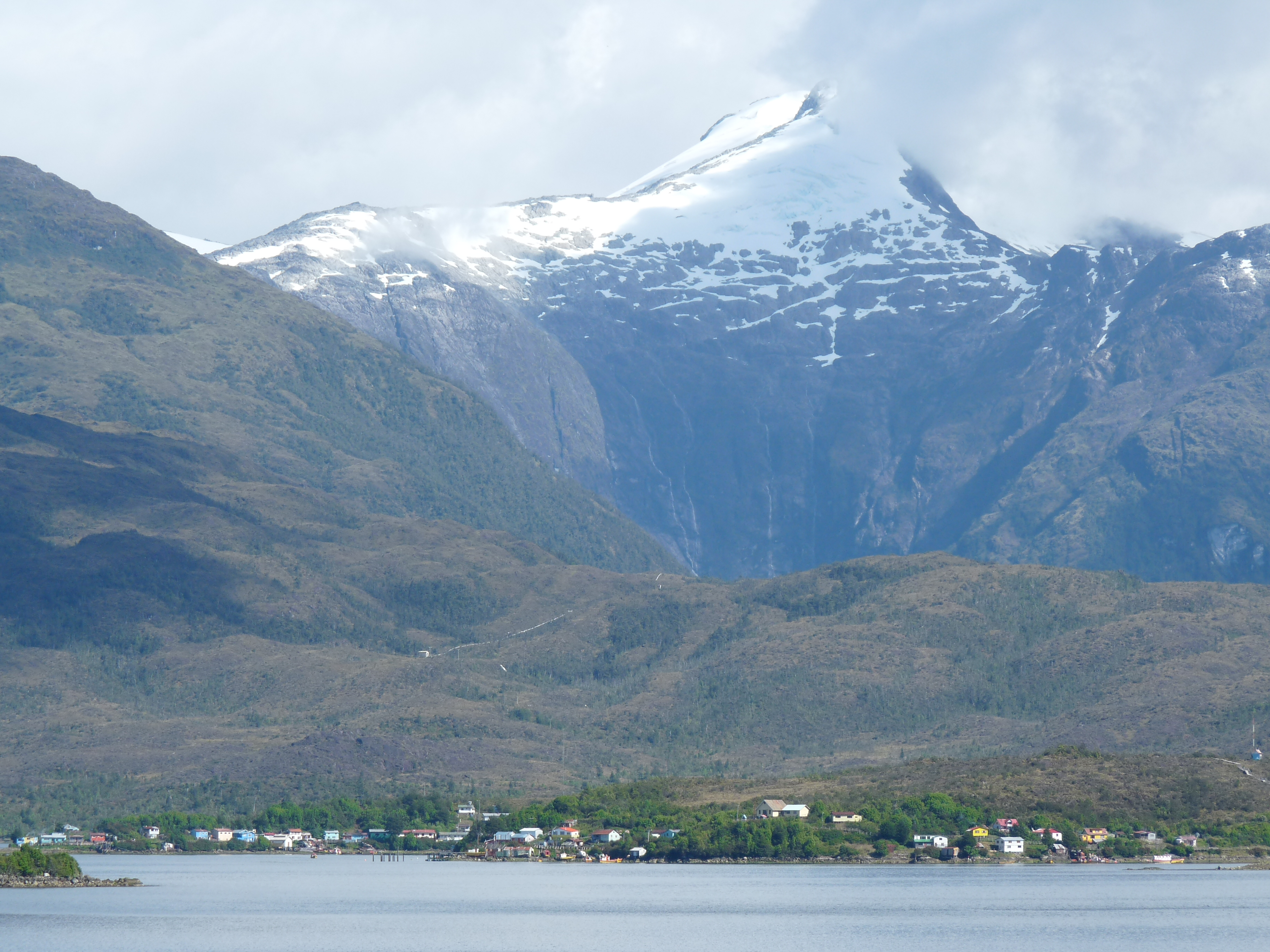

- Location within Chile
- Coordinates: 49.126°S 74.413°W
- Country: Chile
- Region: Magallanes y Antártica Chilena
- Province: Última Esperanza
- Commune: Natales

Government
  - Type: Municipalidad
  - Mayor: Mario Margoni Gadler

Population (2002 census )
  - Total: 176
- Time zone: UTC−3 (CLST)
- Area code: Country + town = 56 + 61

Villa Puerto Edén is a Chilean hamlet and minor port located in Wellington Island, in Natales commune, Última Esperanza Province, Magallanes Region. It is considered one of Chile's most isolated inhabited places together with Easter Island and Villa Las Estrellas. The village is known for being the home of the last Kawéshkar people. Owing to the large tidewater glaciers caused by the region’s super-high precipitation, it is only accessible by sea, on the Navimag ferry from Puerto Montt in the north, or Puerto Natales in the south. There is also a monthly boat from Caleta Tortel.

The population is 176 (2002 census). Owing to the extraordinarily humid climate the village has no roads, with only pedestrian boardwalks connecting the houses and shops. A weekly transport boat takes local fish and shellfish products (the latter mainly mussels) to markets. Margarita Vargas López, a member of the Chilean Constitutional Convention, was born and raised in Villa Puerto Edén.

== Flora and Fauna ==
Puerto Edén well known for sightings of the green-backed firecrown (Sephanoides sephaniodes). Furthermore patagonian sierra finches (Phrygilus patagonicus), austral thrushes (Turdus falcklandii), ringed kingfisher (Megaceryle torquata), and black-crowned night herons (Nycticorax nycticorax)are common.

Regarding flowering plants hardy fuchsia (Fuchsia magellanica), Coicopihue (Philesia magellanica), and Chilean holly (Desfontainia fulgens) are present everywhere.The hardy fuchsia in particular attracts both the green-backed firecrown and the “giant bumblebee” (Bombus dahlbomii). Finally, the Chilean sundew (Drosera uniflora) on the plateau is also worth mentioning.

== Climate ==
Villa Puerto Edén has an extremely wet subpolar oceanic climate (Köppen Cfc) and is widely reputed to be the place in the world with the highest frequency of rainfall, though according to Guinness World Records the highest frequency of rain in a year occurred at Bahia Felix, a little further south, with only eighteen rainless days in the whole of 1916. The annual rainfall is almost exactly equal to that of Little Port Walter in the similarly wet Alaska Panhandle, but is more evenly spread across the year, with a minimum average monthly rainfall of 375 millimetres (14.8 in) as against 200 millimetres (7.9 in) in Little Port Walter.

Climate data for Puerto Edén
Month	Jan	Feb	Mar	Apr	May	Jun	Jul	Aug	Sep	Oct	Nov	Dec	Year
Mean daily maximum °C (°F)	14.7 (58.5)	13.9 (57.0)	12.4 (54.3)	10.3 (50.5)	7.5 (45.5)	5.7 (42.3)	5.5 (41.9)	6.7 (44.1)	8.1 (46.6)	10.3 (50.5)	12.3 (54.1)	13.9 (57.0)	10.1 (50.2)
Daily mean °C (°F)	11.6 (52.9)	10.8 (51.4)	9.7 (49.5)	7.4 (45.3)	4.8 (40.6)	3.3 (37.9)	3.0 (37.4)	3.9 (39.0)	5.2 (41.4)	6.5 (43.7)	8.9 (48.0)	10.8 (51.4)	7.1 (44.8)
Mean daily minimum °C (°F)	8.4 (47.1)	7.9 (46.2)	6.8 (44.2)	5.0 (41.0)	3.0 (37.4)	1.5 (34.7)	0.8 (33.4)	1.6 (34.9)	2.7 (36.9)	4.3 (39.7)	6.0 (42.8)	7.3 (45.1)	4.6 (40.3)
Average precipitation mm (inches)	507.5 (19.98)	523.1 (20.59)	532.2 (20.95)	525.2 (20.68)	508.7 (20.03)	482.8 (19.01)	499.7 (19.67)	419.2 (16.50)	377.9 (14.88)	447.2 (17.61)	456.7 (17.98)	464.8 (18.30)	5,745 (226.18)
Source: Meteorología Interactiva

== Gallery ==
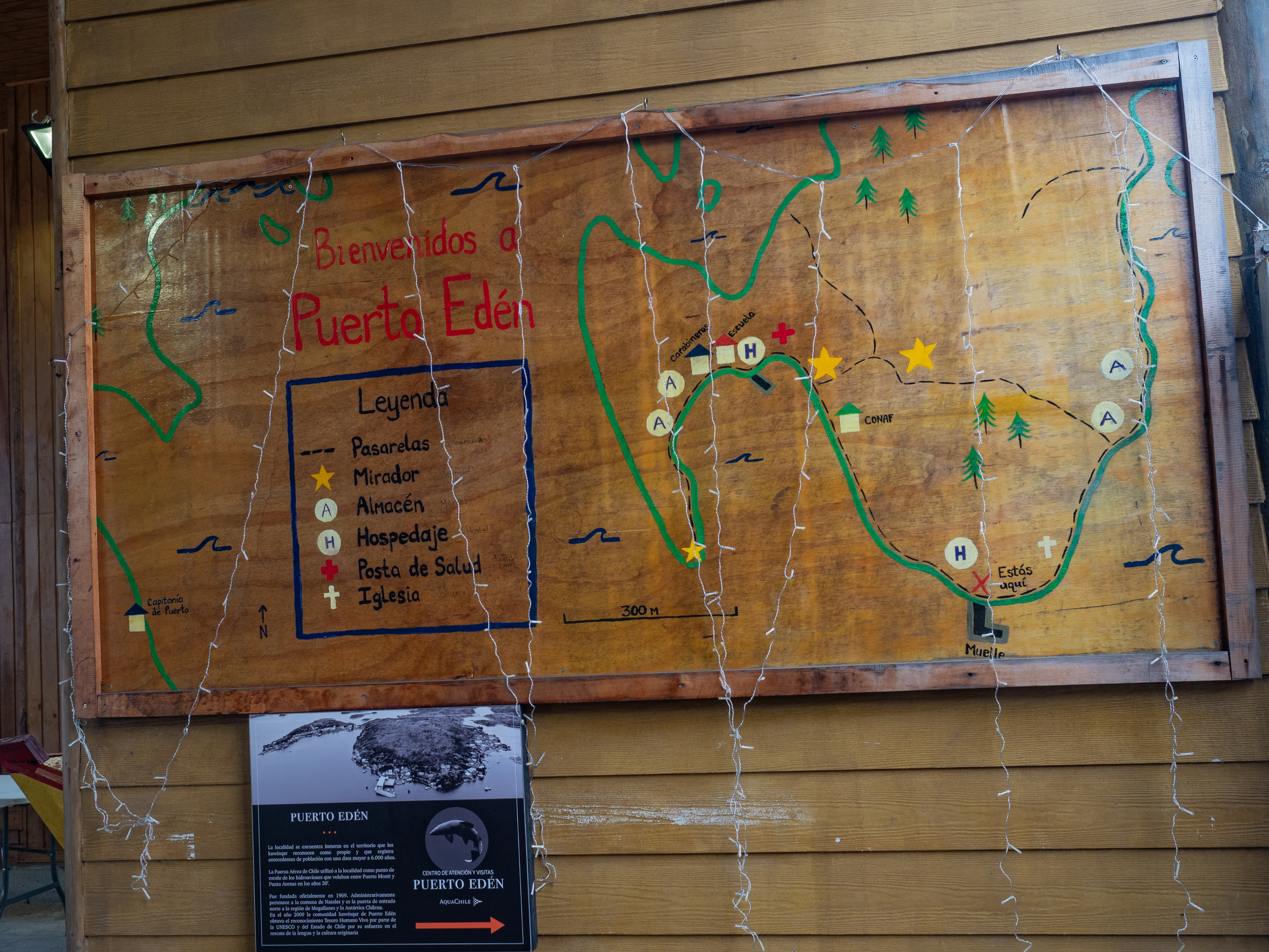
Map of the hamlet

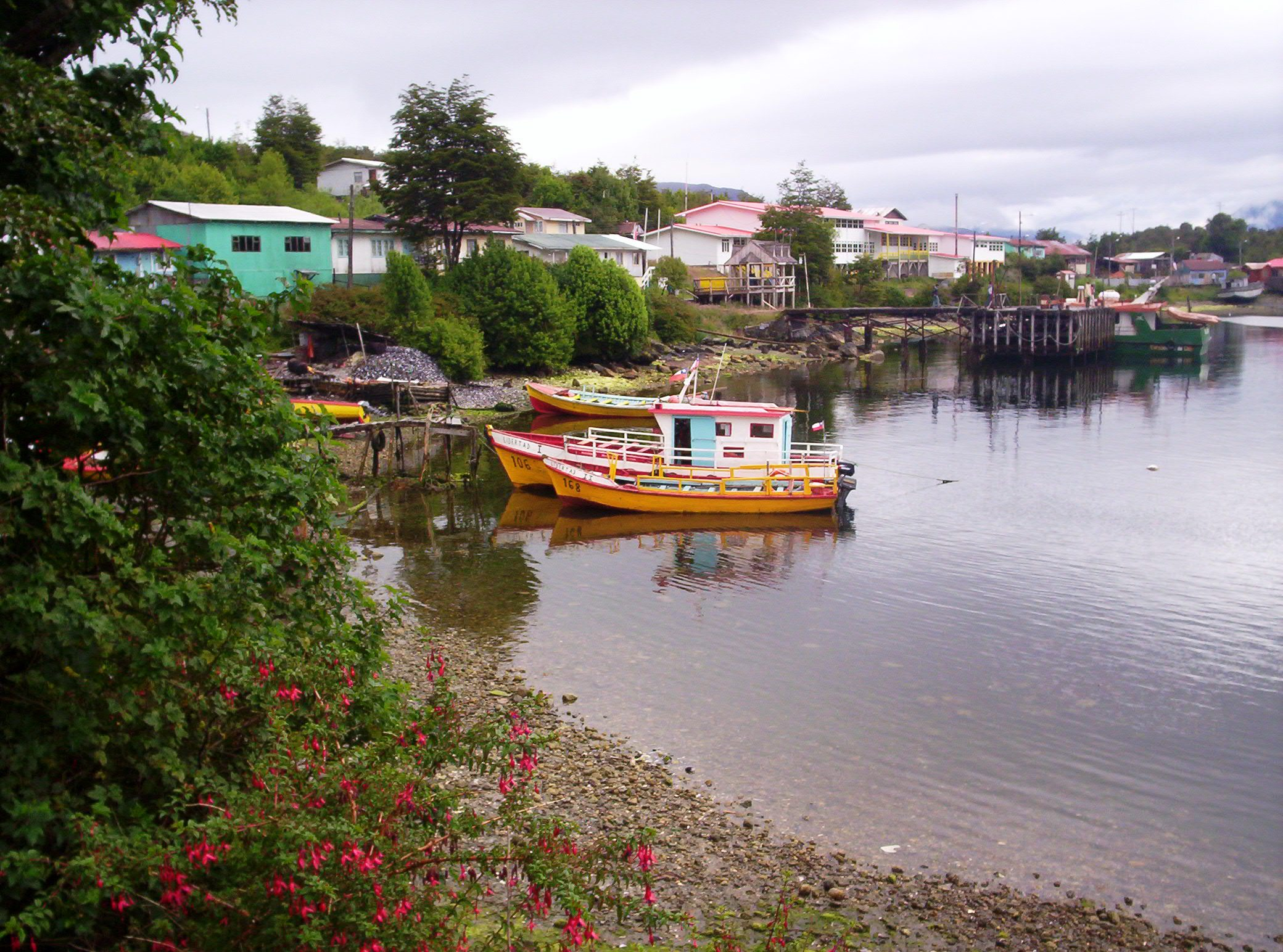
View of Villa Puerto Edén's docks

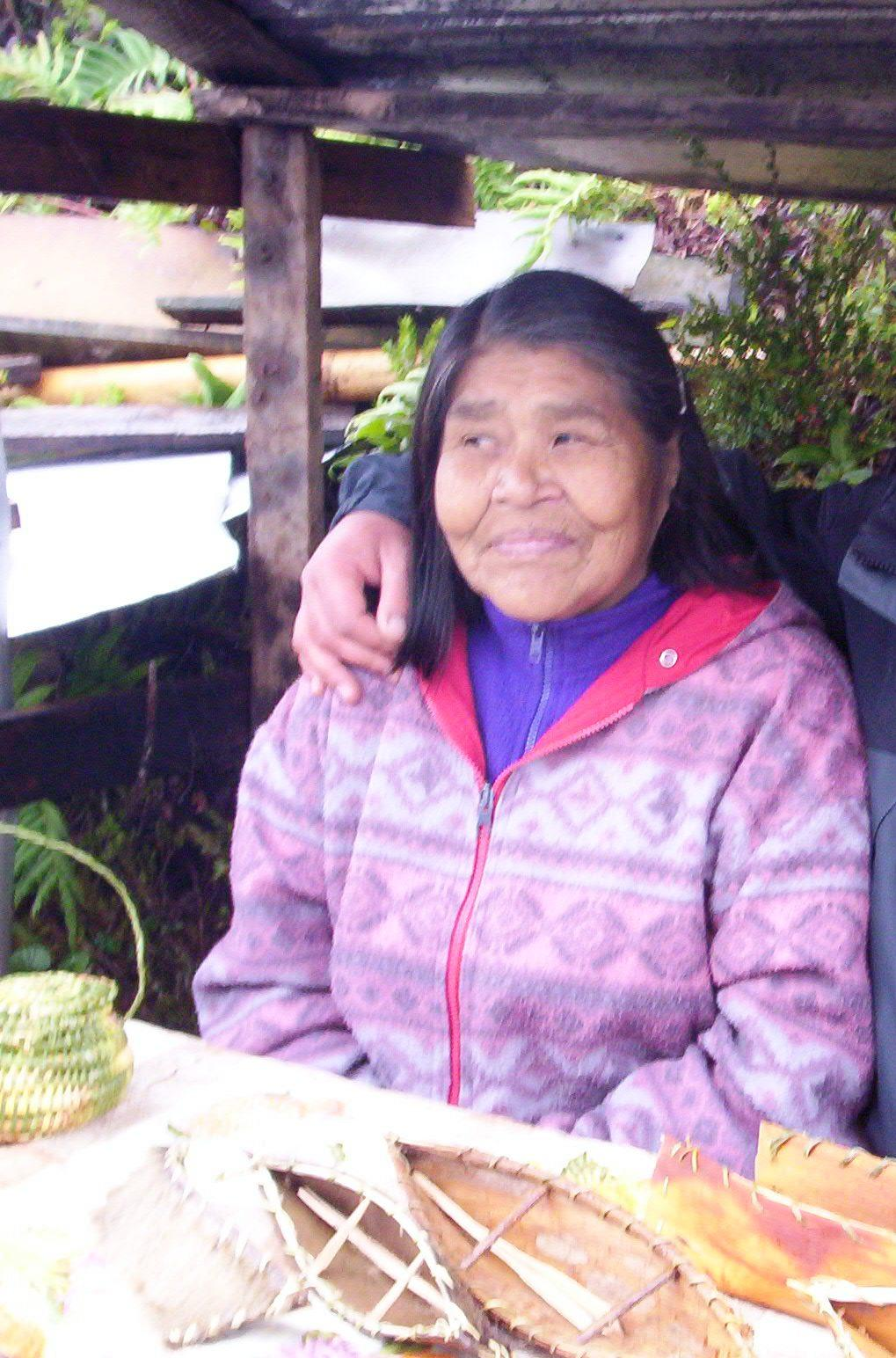
Alacaluf woman

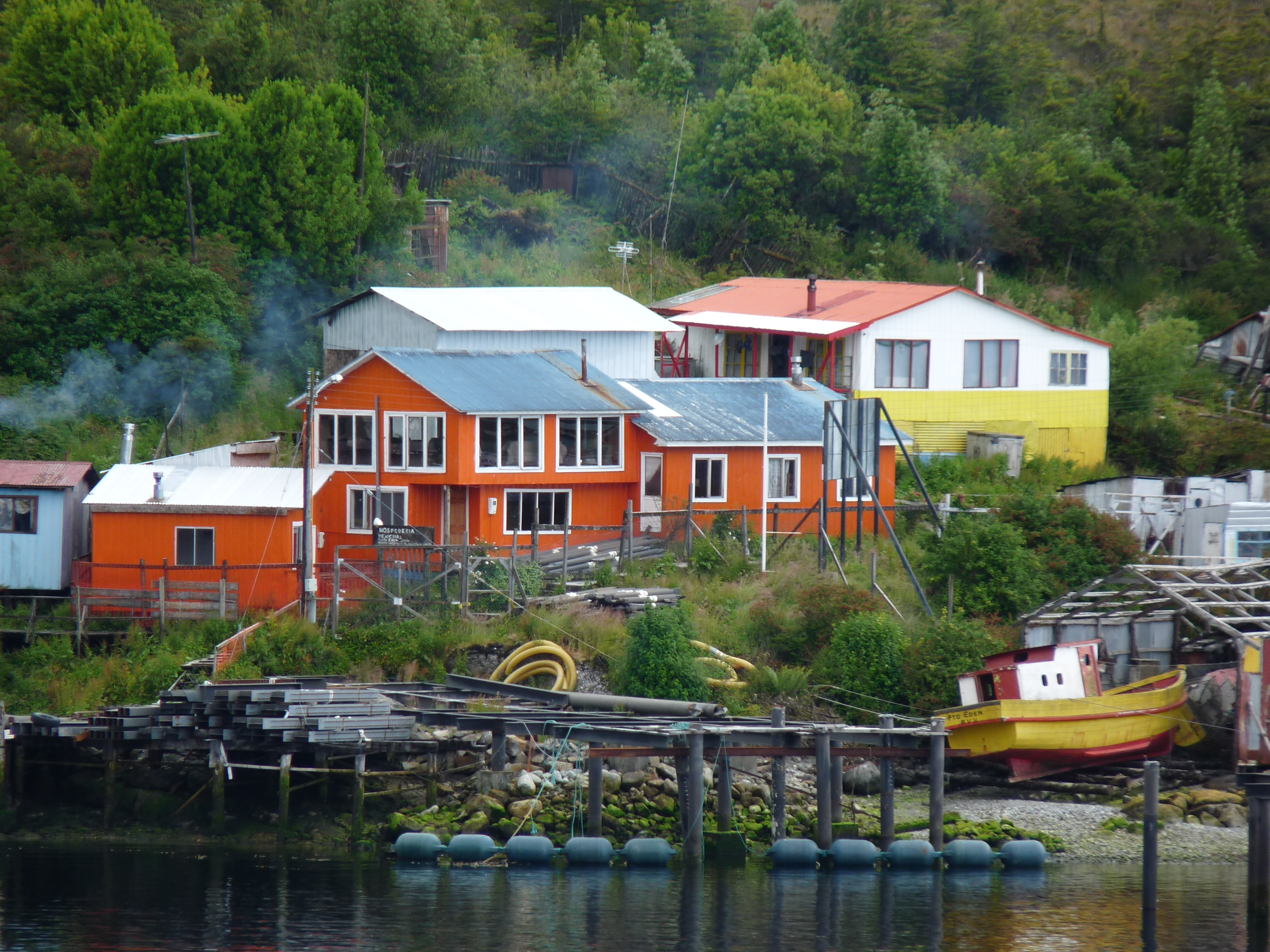
Houses of Puerto Edén

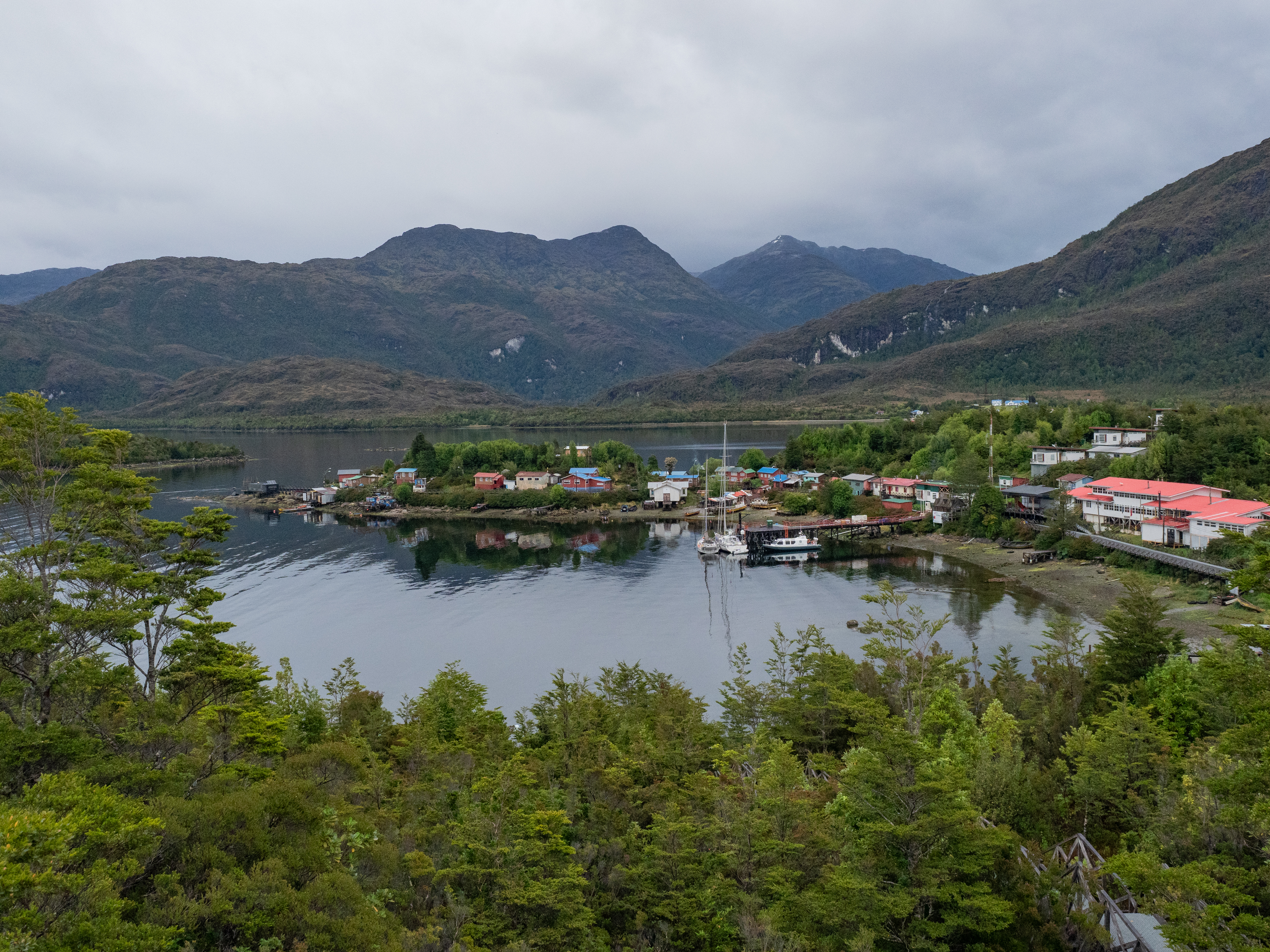
View from the plateau

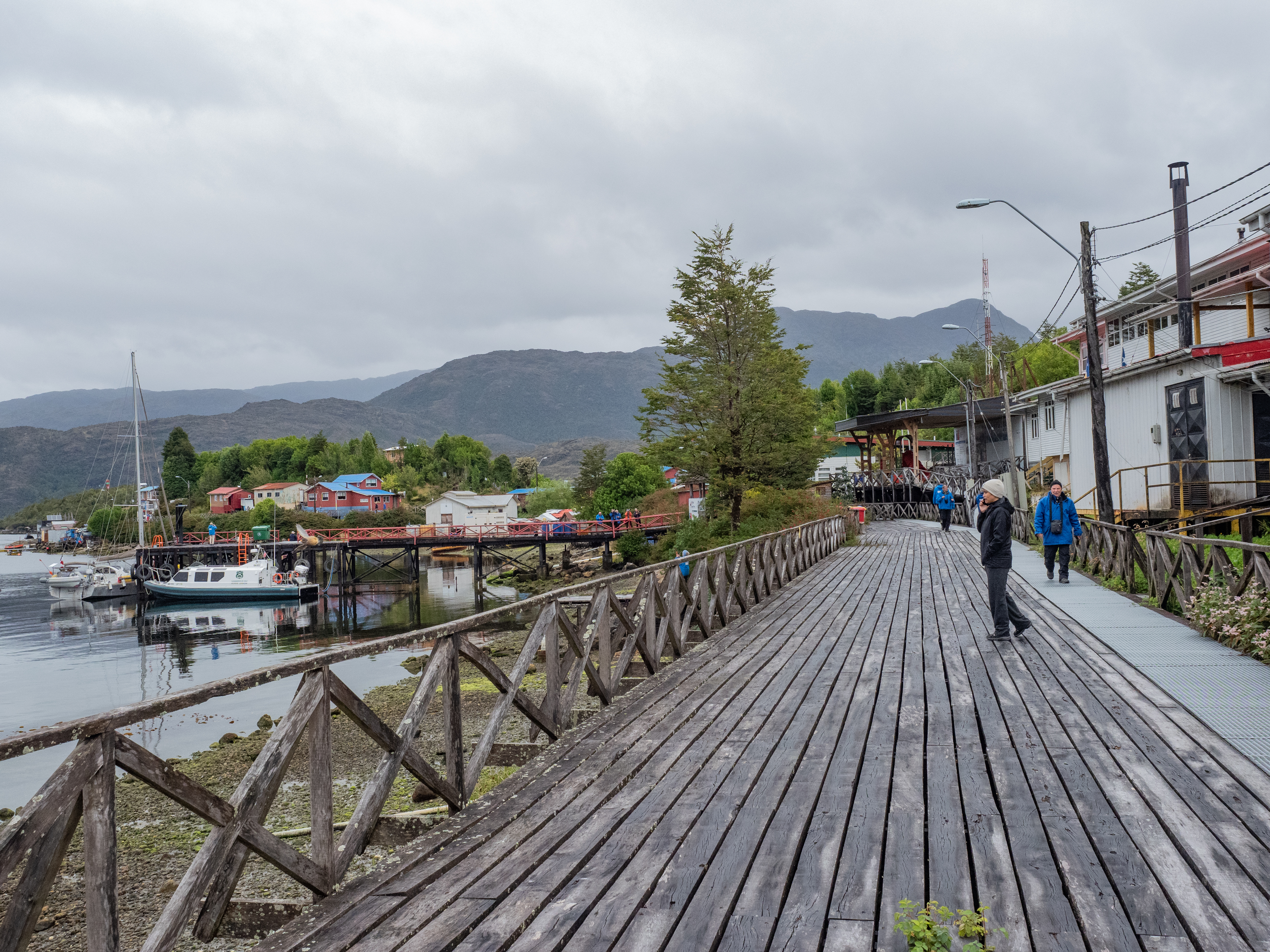
Walkway near the school

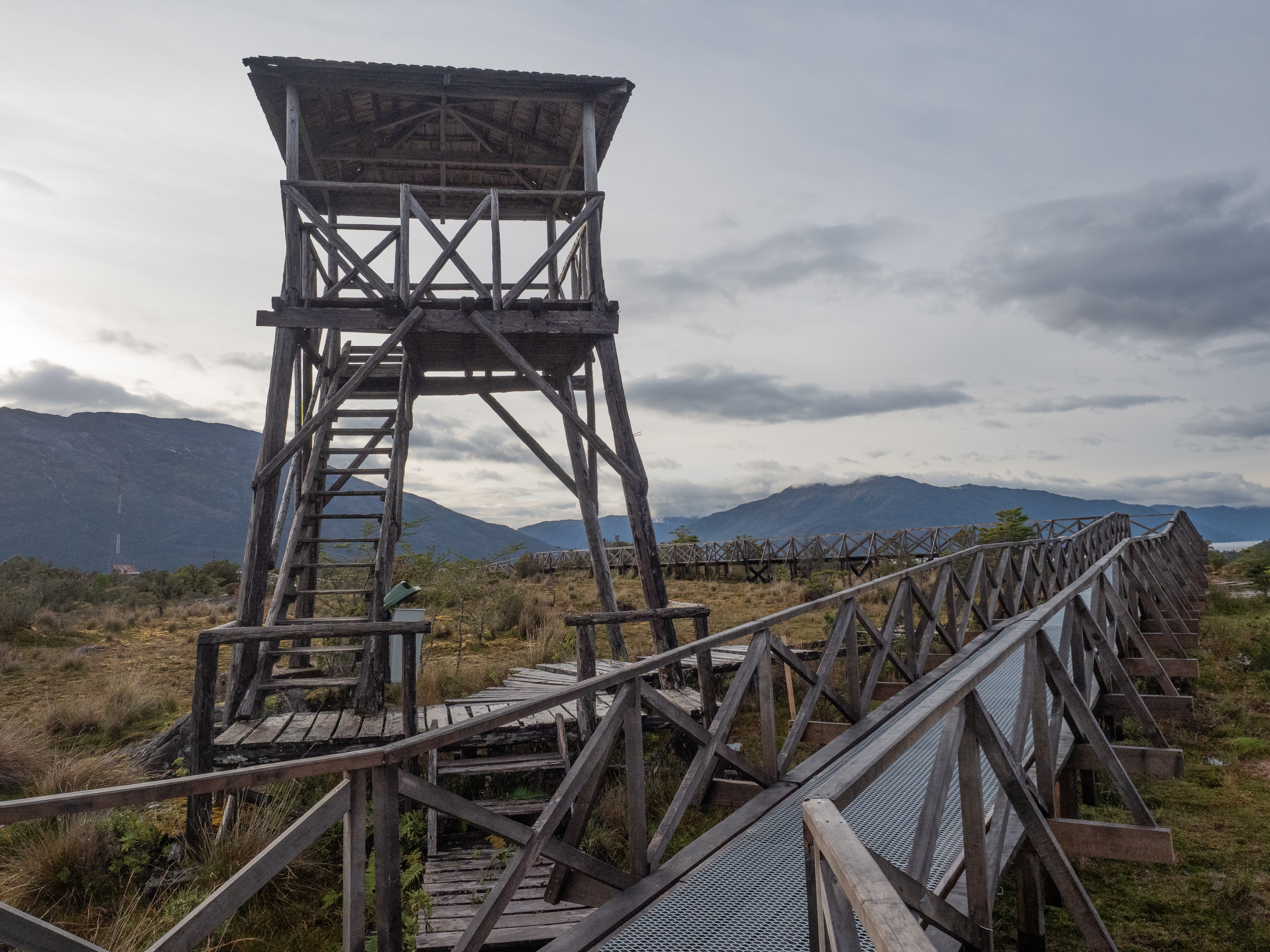
Walkways on the plateau

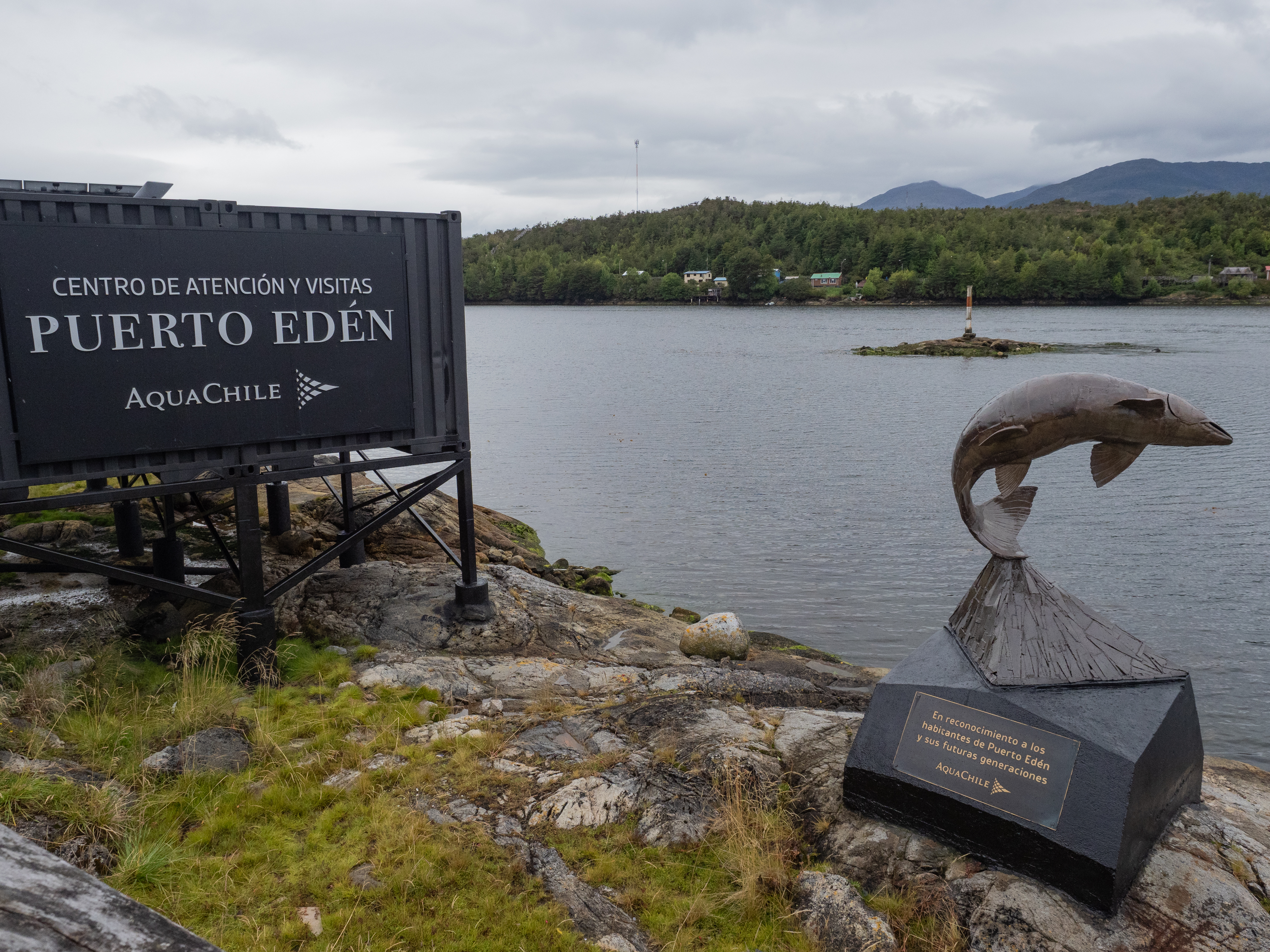
Statue and"visitor centre"

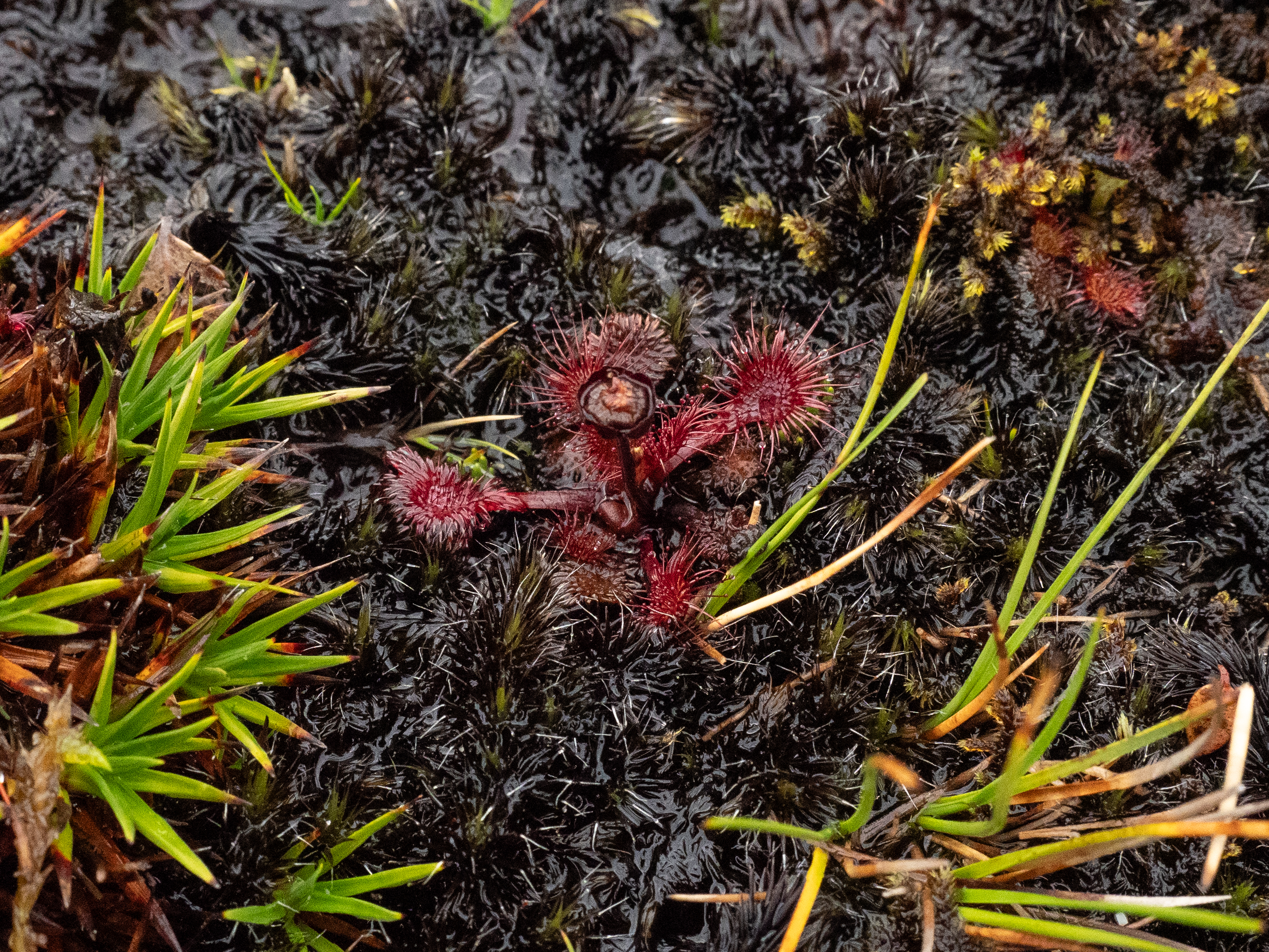
Chilean sundew (Drosera uniflora)

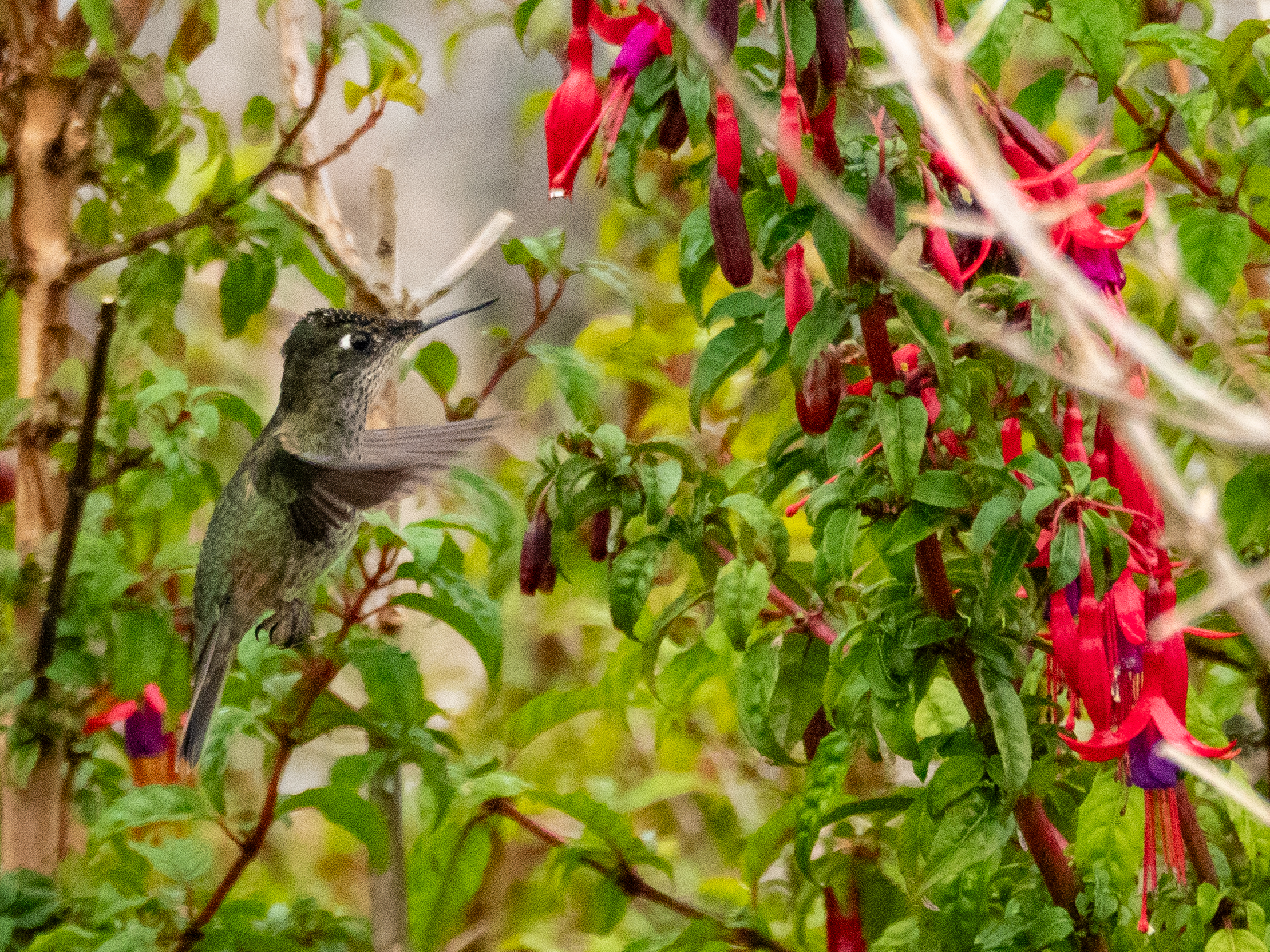
Green-backed firecrown (Sephanoides sephaniodes)

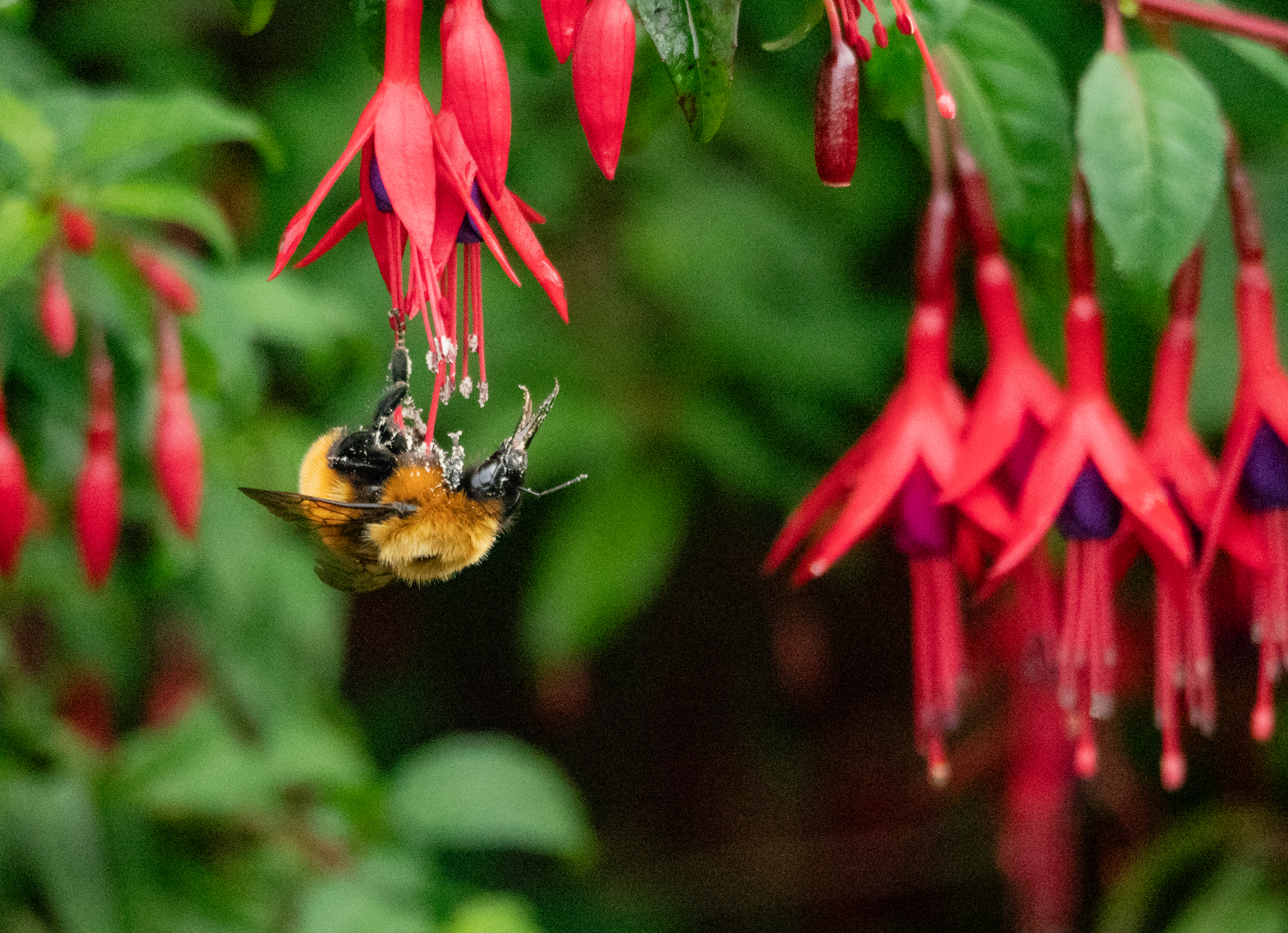
'Giant bumblebee' (Bombus dahlbomii,)

== See also ==
- Wettest places on Earth
- Puerto Edén Igneous and Metamorphic Complex
- Media related to Villa Puerto Edén at Wikimedia Commons
