= Kawésqar =

Indigenous people of Chilean Patagonia

- Flag

Total population
- 2,163

Regions with significant populations
- Chile: 2,153 (2024)
- Argentina: 10 (2022)

Languages
- Spanish, Kawésqar

Religion
- Traditional tribal religion, Christian (mostly Protestant)

Related ethnic groups
- Yahgan

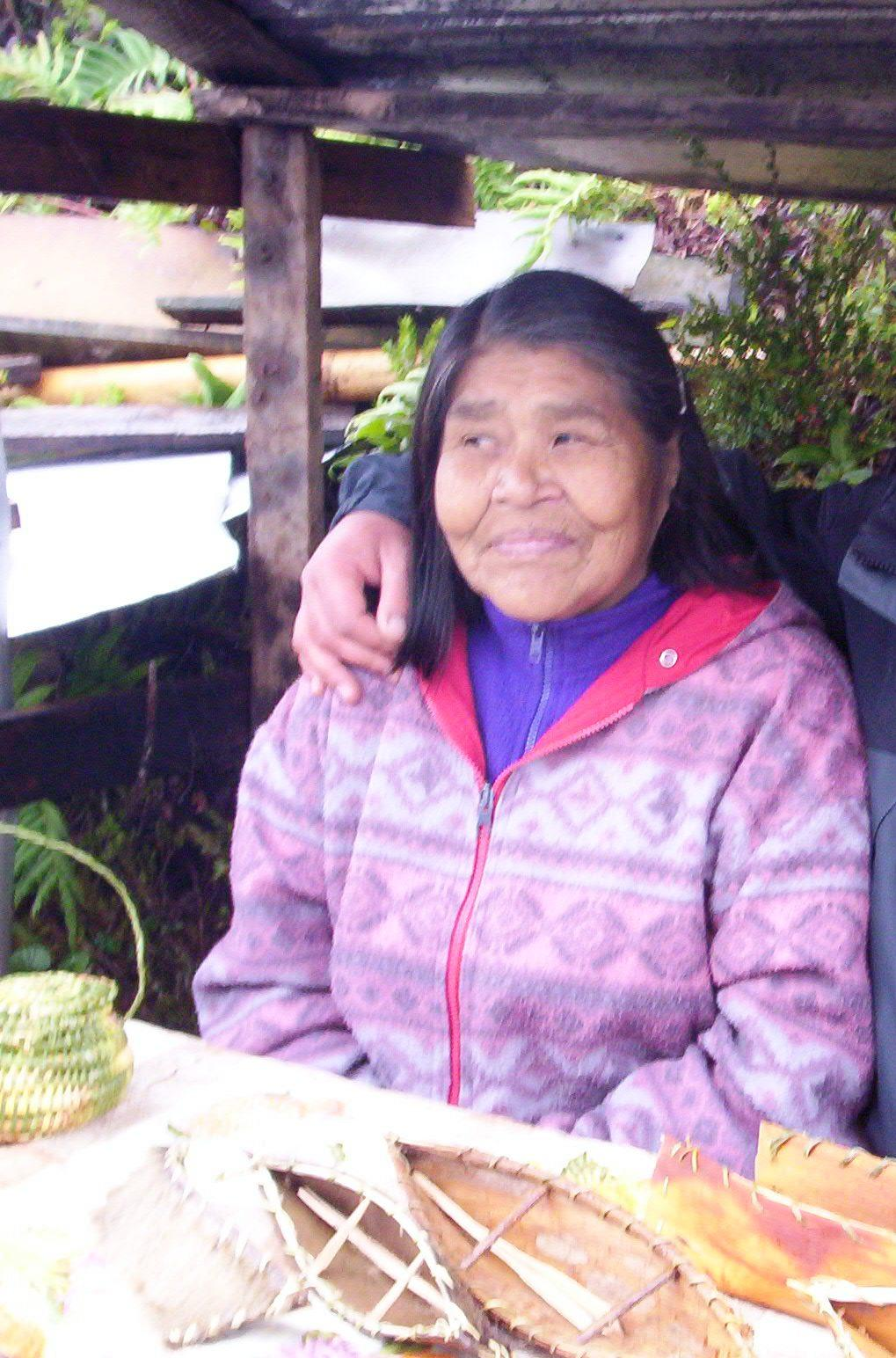
A Kawésqar woman selling handicrafts to tourists in Villa Puerto Edén, Chile.

The Kawésqar, also known as the Kaweskar, Alacaluf, Alacalufe or Halakwulup, are an Indigenous people who live in Chilean Patagonia, specifically in the Brunswick Peninsula, and Wellington, Santa Inés, and Desolación islands northwest of the Strait of Magellan and south of the Gulf of Penas. Their traditional language is known as Kawésqar, a word that means “person” or “human being”; it is endangered as few native speakers survive.

In the last century, their population was reduced by massacres and death from colonial diseases. Furthermore, their traditional way of life underwent a major transformation after contact firstly with European sailors and later with Chileans. In the 21st century, most of the Kawésqar live in the village of Puerto Edén and in the cities of Puerto Natales and Punta Arenas.

It has been proposed that the Caucahue people known from colonial-era records either are ancient Kawésqar or came to merge with the Kawésqar.

According to the 2002 census, there were 2,622 people in Chile who declared themselves to be members of the Kawésqar people. In the 2017 census, this figure rose to 3,448 people, and since Chile recognised them under Indigenous Law 19,253 of 1993, they are currently organised into 14 Indigenous Communities.

== Etymology ==
The English and other Europeans initially adopted the name that the Yahgan (also known as Yámana), a competing Indigenous tribe whom they met first in central and southern Tierra del Fuego, used for these people: "Alacaluf" or "Halakwulup" (meaning "mussel eater" in the Yahgan language). Their own name for themselves (autonym) is Kawésqar.

== Economy ==
Like the Yahgan in southern Chile and Argentina, the Kawésqar used to be a nomadic seafaring people, called canoe-people by some anthropologists. They made canoes that were eight to nine meters long and one meter wide, which would hold a family and its dog. They continued this fishing, nomadic practice until the twentieth century, when they were moved into settlements on land. Because of their maritime culture, the Kawésqar have never farmed the land.

== Population ==
Distribution of the pre-Hispanic people of Chile, north is to the right

The total population of the Kawésqar was estimated not to exceed 5,000. They ranged from the area between the Gulf of Penas (Golfo de Penas) to the north and the Brecknock Peninsula (Península de Brecknock) to the south. Like other Indigenous peoples, they suffered high fatalities from endemic European infectious diseases. Their environment was disrupted as Europeans began to settle in the area in the late 1880s. A 2022 estimate puts the total population of the Kawésqar before the 19th- and early 20th-century collapse at 3,700 to 3,900. The Little Ice Age, lasting from the 17th to the 19th centuries, may also have had a negative impact on the Kawésqar population.

In the 1930s many remaining Kawésqar were relocated to Wellington Island, in the town of Villa Puerto Edén, to shield them from pressures from the majority culture. Later they moved further south, to Puerto Natales and Punta Arenas.

In the 21st century, few Kawésqar remain. The 2002 census found 2,622 people identifying as Kawésqar (defined as those who still practiced their native culture or spoke their native language). In 2006, only 15 full-blooded members remained, but numerous mestizo have Kawésqar ancestry. Lessons in the Kawésqar language are part of the local curriculum, but few native speakers remain to encourage daily use of their traditional language. In 2021, Kawésqar activist Margarita Vargas López was elected to represent the nation in the Chilean Constitutional Convention.

=== Tribes and languages ===
Adwipliin, Aksánas, Alacaluf, Cálen (Cálenches, Calenes), Caucahué, Enoo, Lecheyel, Taíjataf (Tayataf), Yequinahuere (Yequinahue, Yekinauer).

By 1884 Thomas Bridges, an Anglican missionary based in Ushuaia who had been proselytising and studying the Indigenous peoples of Tierra del Fuego since the late 1860s, and his son Despard compiled a 1,200-word vocabulary for the Kawésqar language in the form of a manuscript. Through the late 19th and early 20th centuries, numerous missionaries and anthropologists moved among the Indigenous peoples to record, study and, in the case of the missionaries, proselytise them.

== Kawésqar in human zoos ==
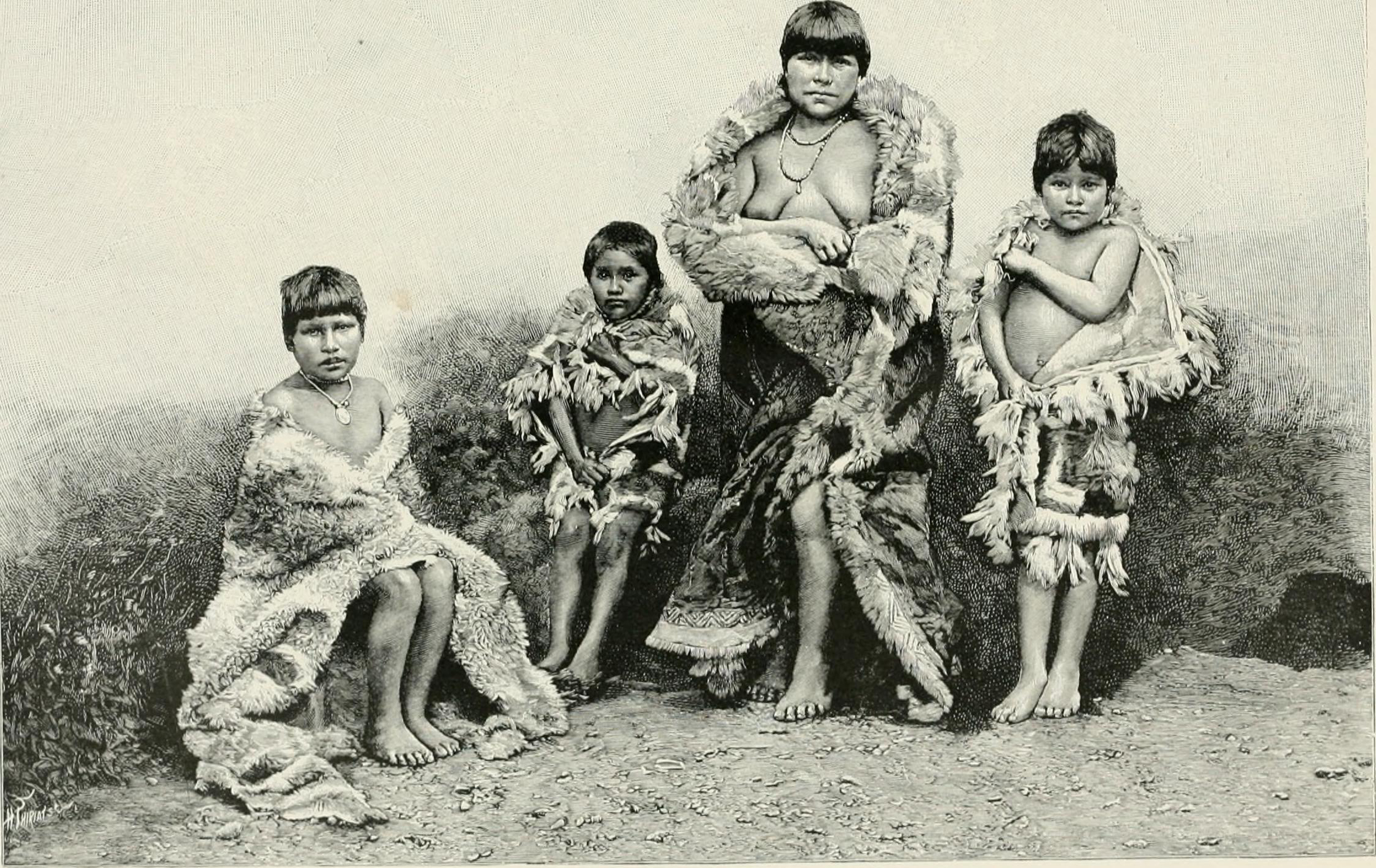
"Alakaluf Fuegians, dressed in huanaco skins" (c. 1882)

In 1881, European anthropologists took eleven Kawésqar people from Patagonia to be exhibited in the Bois de Boulogne in Paris, and in the Berlin Zoological Garden. Only four survived to return to Chile. Early in 2010, the remains of five of the seven who died in Europe were repatriated from the University of Zurich, Switzerland, where they had been held for studies. Upon the return of the remains, Chilean president Michelle Bachelet formally apologized for the state having allowed these Indigenous people to be taken out of the country to be exhibited and treated like animals.

== See also ==
- Kawésqar language
- Alberto Achacaz Walakial, Kawésqar man who died in 2008
- Who Will Remember the People..., a 1986 novel by Jean Raspail about the history of the Alacalufe people
- The Pearl Button, a 2015 documentary film
