= Kawésqar language =

Endangered Alacalufan language of Chile

Kawésqar
- Alacaluf
- Kawésqar, Qawasqar
- Native to: Chile
- Region: Channel Region, western Patagonia, Wellington Island off south Chilean coast, 49° south, with centre in Villa Puerto Edén.
- Ethnicity: 2,600 Alacaluf people (2002 census)
- Native speakers: 8 (2022)
- Language family: Alacalufan: Kawésqar
- Writing system: Latin

Language codes
- ISO 639-3: alc
- Glottolog: qawa1238
- ELP: Kawésqar
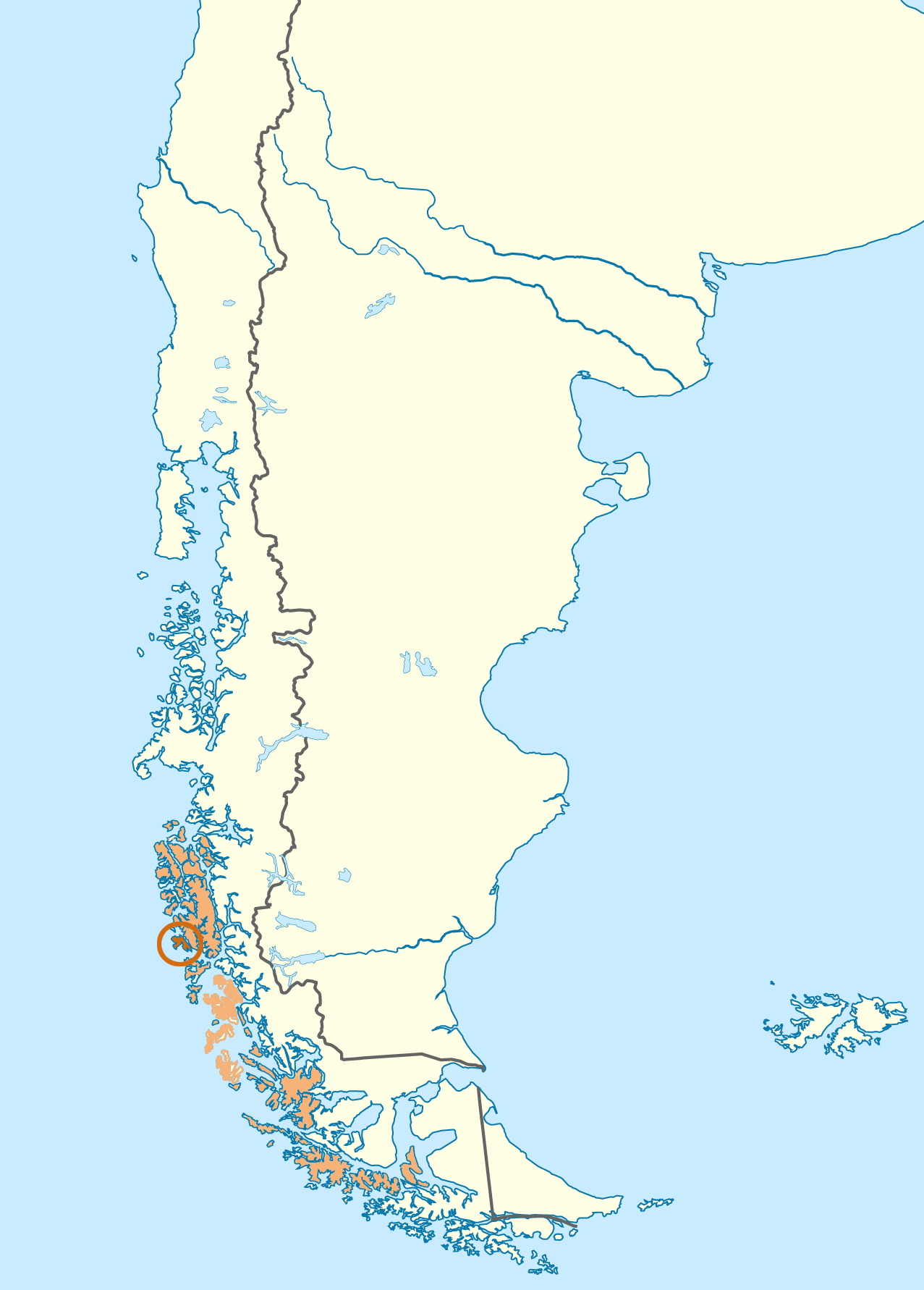

- Kawésqar is classified as Critically Endangered by the UNESCO Atlas of the World's Languages in Danger.

Kawésqar (Qawasqar), also known as Alacaluf, is a critically endangered Alacalufan language spoken in southern Chile by the Kawésqar people. Originally part of a small family, only the northern language remains. In 2009, only a handful of elderly people spoke the language, most of whom lived on Wellington Island off the southwest coast of Chile.

== Phonology ==
=== Vowels ===
	Front	Central	Back
Close	i		u
Mid	e		o
Open	æ	a	

=== Consonants ===
		Labial	Alveolar	Palatal	Velar	Uvular	Glottal
Nasal		m	n		ŋ		
Plosive	Plain	p	t	t͡ɕ	k	q	ʔ
Plosive	Ejective	pʼ	tʼ	t͡ɕʼ	kʼ		ʔ
Fricative		f	s		x		h
Tap / flap			ɾ				
Trill			r				
Approximant		w	l	j			

== Alphabet ==
The alphabet in use has the following letters: a, æ, c, cꞌ, e, f, h, i, j, k, kꞌ, l, m, n, o, p, pꞌ, q, r, rr, s, t, tꞌ, u, w, x. However, differences are reported between dialects, and some sounds are not represented.

== Morphology and syntax ==
Kawésqar has a complex system of grammatical tense, which includes a basic morphological contrast between future, present, immediate past, recent past, distant past, and mythological past events.

== See also ==
- Kawésqar people
- List of endangered languages in South America

== Bibliography ==
- Aguilera Faúndez, Oscar (1978). Léxico Kawesqar-Español, Español-Kawesqar. Boletín de filología (Universidad de Chile, Facultad de Filosofía y Letras) 29.
- Aguilera Faúndez, Oscar (2001): Gramática de la lengua kawésqar. Temuco: Corporación de Desarrollo Indígena.
- Clairis, Christos (1987): El qawasqar. Lingüística fueguina. Teoría y descripción. Valdivia: Universidad Austral de Chile [Anejo de Estudios Filológicos 12].
- Adelaar, Willem & Muysken, Pieter C. 2004. The Languages of the Andes. Cambridge Language Surveys. Cambridge: Cambridge University Press.
