= Wellington Island =

Chilean island

Wellington
Native name: Isla Wellington
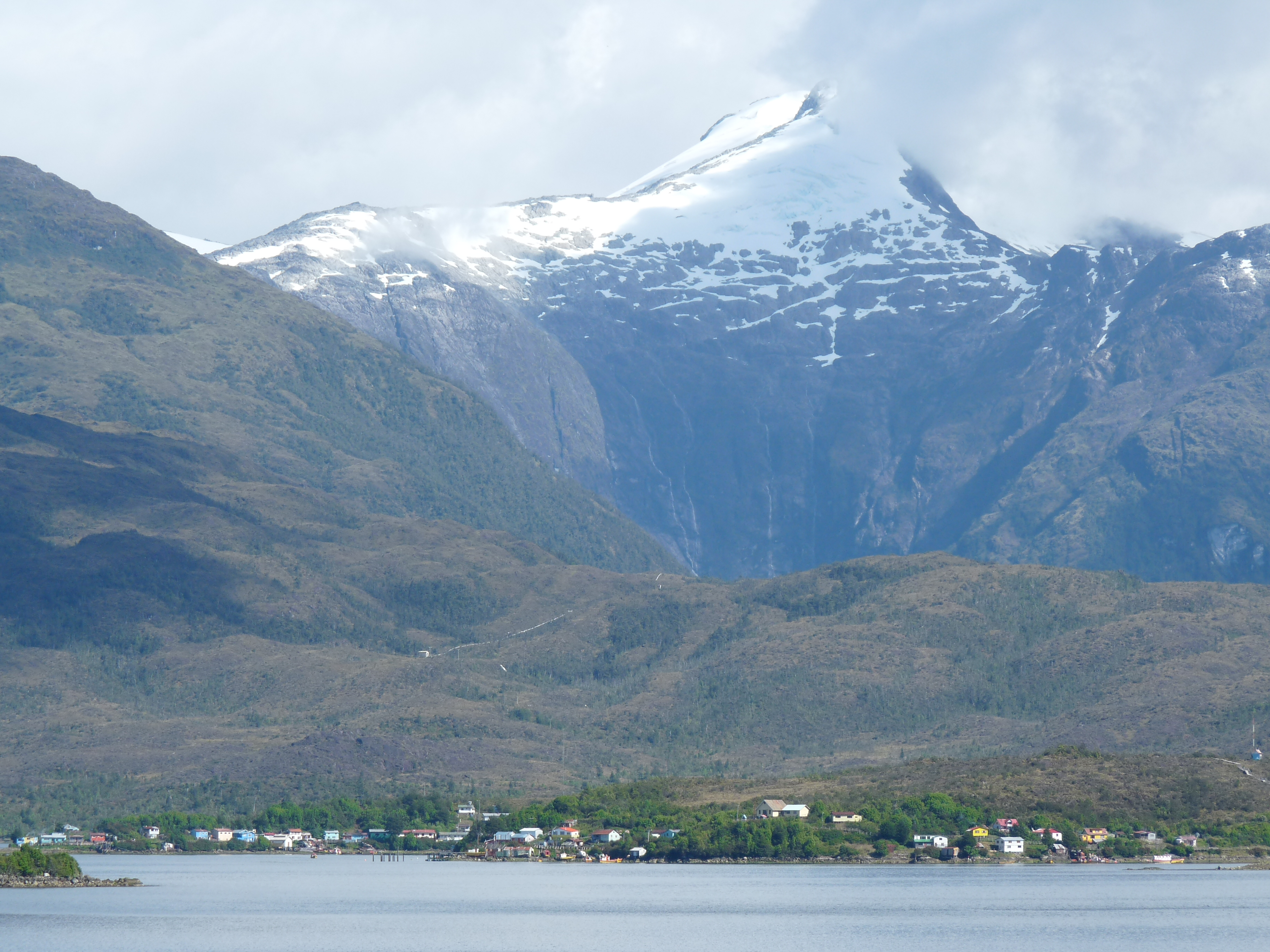
- Puerto Edén on Wellington Island in the foreground

- Location within Chile

Geography
- Location: Pacific Ocean
- Coordinates: 49°20′S 74°40′W
- Archipelago: Wellington Archipelago
- Area: 5,555.7 km^{2} (2,145.1 sq mi)
- Coastline: 1,596.8 km (992.21 mi)
- Highest elevation: 1,463 m (4800 ft)
- Highest point: Unnamed

Administration
- Chile
- Region: Magallanes
- Province: Última Esperanza Province
- Commune: Puerto Natales

Demographics
- Population: 340 (2017)
- Ethnic groups: Kawésqar

Additional information
- NGA UFI=-901551

Wellington Island is an island west of the Southern Patagonian Ice Field, Chile. It has an area of 5,556 km^{2} and most of the island forms part of Bernardo O'Higgins National Park. It is home to the last Kawésqar people, living in the village of Villa Puerto Edén, the only inhabited place on the island.

== Climate ==
Villa Puerto Edén has an extremely wet subpolar oceanic climate (Köppen Cfc) and is widely reputed to be the place in the world with the highest frequency of rainfall.

Climate data for Puerto Edén
Month	Jan	Feb	Mar	Apr	May	Jun	Jul	Aug	Sep	Oct	Nov	Dec	Year
Mean daily maximum °C (°F)	14.7 (58.5)	13.9 (57.0)	12.4 (54.3)	10.3 (50.5)	7.5 (45.5)	5.7 (42.3)	5.5 (41.9)	6.7 (44.1)	8.1 (46.6)	10.3 (50.5)	12.3 (54.1)	13.9 (57.0)	10.1 (50.2)
Daily mean °C (°F)	11.6 (52.9)	10.8 (51.4)	9.7 (49.5)	7.4 (45.3)	4.8 (40.6)	3.3 (37.9)	3.0 (37.4)	3.9 (39.0)	5.2 (41.4)	6.5 (43.7)	8.9 (48.0)	10.8 (51.4)	7.1 (44.8)
Mean daily minimum °C (°F)	8.4 (47.1)	7.9 (46.2)	6.8 (44.2)	5.0 (41.0)	3.0 (37.4)	1.5 (34.7)	0.8 (33.4)	1.6 (34.9)	2.7 (36.9)	4.3 (39.7)	6.0 (42.8)	7.3 (45.1)	4.6 (40.3)
Average precipitation mm (inches)	507.5 (19.98)	523.1 (20.59)	532.2 (20.95)	525.2 (20.68)	508.7 (20.03)	482.8 (19.01)	499.7 (19.67)	419.2 (16.50)	377.9 (14.88)	447.2 (17.61)	456.7 (17.98)	464.8 (18.30)	5,745 (226.18)
Source: Meteorología Interactiva

== See also ==
- Serrano Island, also named Little Wellington Island
