= Jorge Saffirio =

Chilean politician (born 1953)

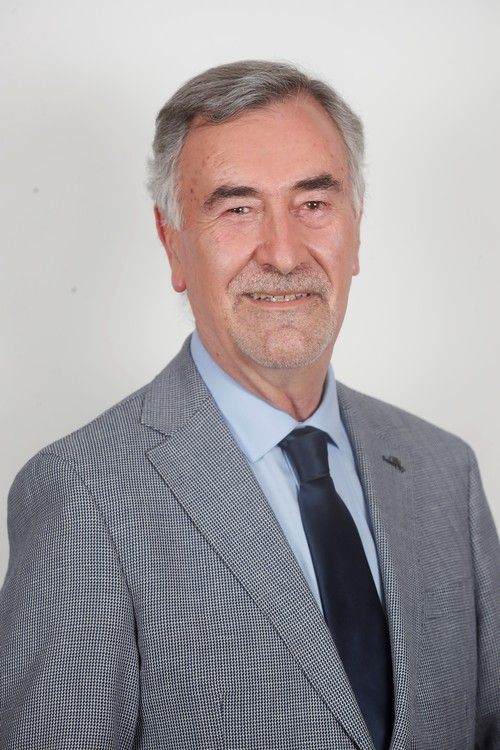
- Saffirio in 2022

Member of the Chamber of Deputies
- In office 11 March 2022 – 11 March 2026
- Constituency: District 22

Governor of Malleco Province
- In office 11 December 2008 – 11 March 2010
- President: Michelle Bachelet
- Preceded by: Rubén Quilapi Cabrapan
- Succeeded by: Jorge Rathgeb Schifferli

Mayor of Victoria
- In office 6 December 2000 – 6 December 2008
- Preceded by: Patricio Villablanca Leiva
- Succeeded by: Hugo Monsalves Castillo

Counselor of Victoria
- In office 6 December 1996 – 6 December 2000

Personal details
- Born: June 9, 1953 (age 72) Temuco, Chile
- Party: Christian Democratic Party (1987-2022); Democrats (2022-)
- Spouse: Raquel Bernadita Peña Castro
- Relations: René Saffirio (brother) Eduardo Saffirio (cousin)
- Children: 3
- Website: Official Website

Jorge Alejandro Saffirio Espinoza (born 9 June 1593) is a Chilean politician and member of the Chamber of Deputies of Chile.

Saffirio studied civil construction at the University of La Frontera. He started his political career as a city counselor of Victoria, Chile and then became the mayor of Victoria. He was then elected to be the governor of Malleco Province. He was elected to the Chamber of Deputies of Chile in the 2021 Chilean general election.

== Biography ==
He was born in Temuco on 9 June 1953. His parents are Constantino Segundo Saffirio Vásquez and Lía del Carmen Espinoza Sánchez. He is the brother of former deputy René Saffirio.

He has lived for more than 40 years in Victoria, where he has defined himself as "proud of my land, always seeking to strengthen its virtues and overcome its difficulties."

He married Raquel Bernadita Peña Castro on 5 February 1981, with whom he has three daughters.

=== Professional career ===
During his university years, he lived in Temuco in 1973, where he began studies in Civil Construction at what is now the University of La Frontera. During this period, he participated in various social causes focused on equality of opportunity, decentralization, and expanded rights.

He has described himself as a small business owner in the housing sector.

== Political career ==
He served as councillor of the commune of Victoria between 1996 and 2000, and subsequently as Mayor of Victoria for two consecutive terms between 2000 and 2008.

He later served as Governor of the Malleco Province between 11 December 2008 and 11 March 2010, and briefly as Regional Director of the Housing and Urban Development Service (SERVIU) in 2014.

He ran unsuccessfully for Mayor of Victoria in the municipal elections of 2012 and again in the elections held on 15 and 16 May 2021.

In the parliamentary elections held on 21 November 2021, he was elected Deputy for the 22nd District of the Araucanía Region—comprising the communes of Angol, Collipulli, Curacautín, Ercilla, Galvarino, Lautaro, Lonquimay, Los Sauces, Lumaco, Melipeuco, Perquenco, Purén, Renaico, Traiguén, Victoria, and Vilcún—representing the Christian Democratic Party within the New Social Pact pact. He obtained 5,913 votes, equivalent to 5.49% of the valid votes cast.

On 30 November 2022, he resigned from the Christian Democratic Party. In January 2023, he joined the Democrats party.

He ran for re-election for the same district in the parliamentary elections held on 16 November 2025 as an independent candidate under a quota of the Democrats party within the Chile Grande y Unido pact. He was not elected, obtaining 15,294 votes, equivalent to 7.86% of the total votes cast.
