= Gloria Naveillán =

Chilean politician (born 1960)

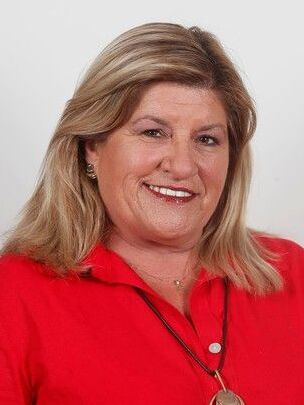
- Gloria Naveillán in 2022

Member of the Chamber of Deputies
- Incumbent
- Assumed office 11 March 2022
- Constituency: District 22

Personal details
- Born: 3 November 1960 (age 65) Chicago, United States
- Party: Independent Democrat Union (1989–2017); Republican Party (2019–2022); National Libertarian Party (2024–)
- Occupation: Politician

María Gloria Naveillán Arriagada (born 3 November 1960) is a Chilean politician in Chile, militant of the National Libertarian Party founded by Johannes Kaiser, and member of the Association for Peace and Reconciliation in Araucanía.

In 2021, she was elected deputy for District 22. In 2025, Naveillán was re-elected.

== Biography ==
Naveillán was born in Chicago, United States, on 3 November 1960. She holds three nationalities, one of them French through her father. She married Alejandro Cortés on 24 September 1982 in Santiago, and they have six children.

She completed her secondary education in 1978 at Villa María Academy in Las Condes, Metropolitan Region. Naveillán later studied for one year in History and Geography Education at the Pedagogical Institute of the University of Chile. Subsequently, she studied Advertising at the Incacea Institute.

Naveillán worked in an advertising agency, a cosmetics company, and a perfume company, among other professional activities. She also helped found the 5th Fire Company of Colina.

== Political career ==
She served as president of the Chicureo Neighbourhood Association and as a former leader of agricultural organizations in Victoria, Malleco Province.

Her first involvement in politics was as a public relations officer for the Municipality of Colina, in the Metropolitan Region. In 2017, she ran for the Chamber of Deputies of Chile as a candidate of the Independent Democratic Union (UDI) in the 22nd District, but was not elected. That same year, she relocated to southern Chile.

She later served as an adviser to Senator Carmen Gloria Aravena of the Araucanía Region on matters related to Indigenous Law.

In the parliamentary elections of 21 November 2021, she was elected as a deputy representing the 22nd District, which includes the communes of Angol, Collipulli, Curacautín, Ercilla, Galvarino, Lautaro, Lonquimay, Los Sauces, Lumaco, Melipeuco, Perquenco, Purén, Renaico, Traiguén, Victoria, and Vilcún, in the Araucanía Region. She was elected within the Christian Social Front electoral pact, running on the list of the Republican Party of Chile, obtaining 6,257 votes, equivalent to 5.81% of the valid votes cast.

On 7 September 2022, she resigned from the Republican Party. After a period as an independent, she joined the National Libertarian Party in July 2024.
