= District 22 (Chamber of Deputies of Chile) =

Electoral district of the Chamber of Deputies of Chile

- Distrito 22
- Electoral District for the Chamber of Deputies
- Location of District 22 within Chile
- Commune: List: Angol; Collipulli; Curacautín; Ercilla; Galvarino; Lautaro; Lonquimay; Los Sauces; Lumaco; Melipeuco; Perquenco; Purén; Renaico; Traiguén; Victoria; Vilcún
- Region: Araucanía
- Population: 296,327 (2017)
- Electorate: 286,162 (2021)
- Area: 17,767 km^{2} (2020)

Current Electoral District
- Created: 2017
- Seats: 4 (2017–present)
- Deputies: List: Juan Carlos Beltrán (RN); Gloria Naveillán (Ind); Jorge Rathgeb (RN); Jorge Saffirio (D)

District 22 (Spanish: Distrito 22) is one of the 28 multi-member electoral districts of the Chamber of Deputies, the lower house of the National Congress, the national legislature of Chile. The district was created by the 2015 electoral reform and came into being at the following general election in 2017. It consists of the province of Malleco, and the communes of Galvarino, Lautaro, Melipeuco, Perquenco and Vilcún in the province of Cautín in the region of Araucanía. The district currently elects four of the 155 members of the Chamber of Deputies using the open party-list proportional representation electoral system. At the 2021 general election the district had 286,162 registered electors.

== Electoral system ==
District 22 currently elects four of the 155 members of the Chamber of Deputies using the open party-list proportional representation electoral system. Parties may form electoral pacts with each other to pool their votes and increase their chances of winning seats. However, the number of candidates nominated by an electoral pact may not exceed the maximum number of candidates that a single party may nominate. Seats are allocated using the D'Hondt method.

== Election results ==
=== Summary ===
Election	Apruebo Dignidad AD / FA			Green Ecologists PEV			Dignidad Ahora DA			New Social Pact NPS / NM			Democratic Convergence CD			Chile Vamos Podemos / Vamos			Party of the People PDG			Christian Social Front FSC		
Election	Votes	%	Seats	Votes	%	Seats	Votes	%	Seats	Votes	%	Seats	Votes	%	Seats	Votes	%	Seats	Votes	%	Seats	Votes	%	Seats
2021	6,721	6.24%	0	2,325	2.16%	0	8,307	7.71%	0	22,497	20.89%	1				42,348	39.33%	2	6,643	6.17%	0	16,703	15.51%	1
2017	6,580	6.08%	0							24,645	22.76%	1	21,335	19.71%	1	55,709	51.45%	2						

=== Detailed ===
==== 2021 ====
Results of the 2021 general election held on 21 November 2021:

Party		Pact	Party					Pact		
Party		Pact	Votes per province		Total votes	%	Seats	Votes	%	Seats
Party		Pact	Cautín (part)	Mall- eco	Total votes	%	Seats	Votes	%	Seats
National Renewal	RN	Chile Podemos +	5,639	27,092	32,731	30.40%	2	42,348	39.33%	2
Independent Democratic Union	UDI	Chile Podemos +	3,297	6,320	9,617	8.93%	0	42,348	39.33%	2
Christian Democratic Party	PDC	New Social Pact	5,826	5,046	10,872	10.10%	1	22,497	20.89%	1
Party for Democracy	PPD	New Social Pact	1,844	8,274	10,118	9.40%	0	22,497	20.89%	1
Socialist Party of Chile	PS	New Social Pact	284	1,223	1,507	1.40%	0	22,497	20.89%	1
Republican Party	REP	Christian Social Front	3,977	9,826	13,803	12.82%	1	16,703	15.51%	1
Christian Conservative Party	PCC	Christian Social Front	1,053	1,847	2,900	2.69%	0	16,703	15.51%	1
Humanist Party	PH	Dignidad Ahora	1,426	3,590	5,016	4.66%	0	8,307	7.71%	0
Equality Party	IGUAL	Dignidad Ahora	2,075	1,216	3,291	3.06%	0	8,307	7.71%	0
Democratic Revolution	RD	Apruebo Dignidad	1,115	1,844	2,959	2.75%	0	6,721	6.24%	0
Social Green Regionalist Federation	FREVS	Apruebo Dignidad	1,071	1,061	2,132	1.98%	0	6,721	6.24%	0
Communist Party of Chile	PC	Apruebo Dignidad	238	1,392	1,630	1.51%	0	6,721	6.24%	0
Party of the People	PDG		2,177	4,466	6,643	6.17%	0	6,643	6.17%	0
Green Ecologist Party	PEV		745	1,580	2,325	2.16%	0	2,325	2.16%	0
United Centre	CU	United Independents	588	875	1,463	1.36%	0	1,463	1.36%	0
Progressive Party	PRO		265	410	675	0.63%	0	675	0.63%	0
Valid votes			31,620	76,062	107,682	100.00%	4	107,682	100.00%	4
Blank votes			3,480	6,532	10,012	8.08%				
Rejected votes – other			1,861	4,335	6,196	5.00%				
Total polled			36,961	86,929	123,890	43.29%				
Registered electors			85,867	200,295	286,162					
Turnout			43.04%	43.40%	43.29%					

The following candidates were elected: Juan Carlos Beltrán (RN), 10,729 votes; Gloria Naveillán (REP), 6,257 votes; Jorge Rathgeb (RN), 20,451 votes; and Jorge Saffirio (PDC), 5,913 votes.

==== 2017 ====
Results of the 2017 general election held on 19 November 2017:

Party		Pact	Party					Pact		
Party		Pact	Votes per province		Total votes	%	Seats	Votes	%	Seats
Party		Pact	Cautín (part)	Mall- eco	Total votes	%	Seats	Votes	%	Seats
National Renewal	RN	Chile Vamos	15,615	31,486	47,101	43.50%	2	55,709	51.45%	2
Independent Democratic Union	UDI	Chile Vamos	1,334	7,274	8,608	7.95%	0	55,709	51.45%	2
Party for Democracy	PPD	Nueva Mayoría	6,059	11,872	17,931	16.56%	1	24,645	22.76%	1
Socialist Party of Chile	PS	Nueva Mayoría	1,440	5,274	6,714	6.20%	0	24,645	22.76%	1
Christian Democratic Party	PDC	Democratic Convergence	5,395	15,940	21,335	19.71%	1	21,335	19.71%	1
Humanist Party	PH	Broad Front	1,856	4,724	6,580	6.08%	0	6,580	6.08%	0
Valid votes			31,699	76,570	108,269	100.00%	4	108,269	100.00%	4
Blank votes			2,745	5,352	8,097	6.68%				
Rejected votes – other			1,523	3,236	4,759	3.93%				
Total polled			35,967	85,158	121,125	43.51%				
Registered electors			81,644	196,772	278,416					
Turnout			44.05%	43.28%	43.51%					

The following candidates were elected: Andrea Parra (PPD), 10,312 votes; Diego Paulsen (RN), 24,405 votes; Jorge Rathgeb (RN), 21,594 votes; and Mario Venegas Cárdenas (PDC), 14,991 votes.
