= White Earthquake =

1995 severe cold weather event in southern Chile

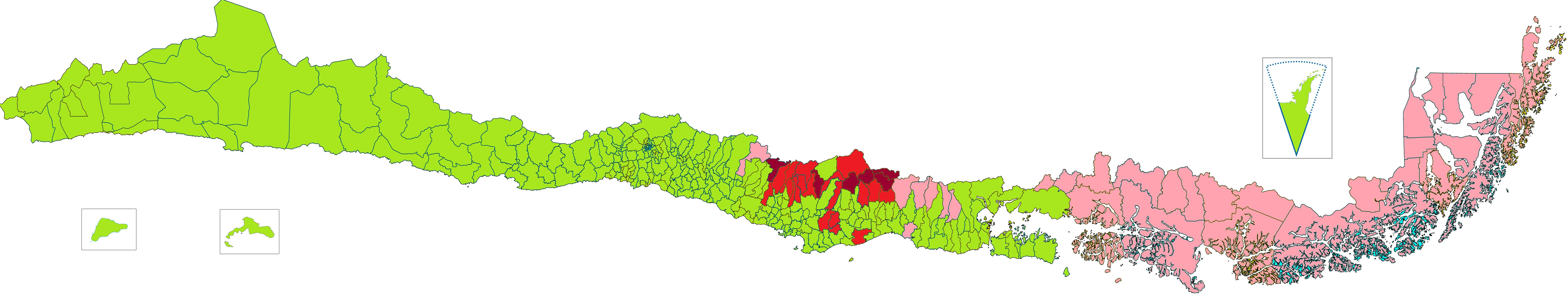
Map of Chile showing communes in state of catastrophe during the White Earthquake in red. Communes in pink were declared zones of "agrarian emergency". Communes in both state of catastrophe and agrarian emergency are shown in dark red

The White Earthquake (Spanish: Terremoto Blanco) was a climatic event consisting of intense winds, cold, snowfall and rain that occurred through southern Chile in August 1995. 7,176 people were left isolated as result of the heavy snowfall and three died. By 16 August, an estimated 176,000 sheep were dead, and 800,000 were in "critical condition". Besides agriculture, the forestry sector was also paralysed. Along Chile Route 9, a number of cars and two buses with passengers were trapped in snow.

Various port facilities along the Chilean coast were destroyed or damaged in the event, including a pier in Bahía Catalina. A number of ships and boats were stranded, damaged or lost. The Chilean Navy lost one patrol boat and ten artisan fishing boats were lost, as well as a number of yachts. The reefer ship Nayadic suffered damage that resulted in an oil spill. The ferry connection to Tierra del Fuego Island through Primera Angostura was closed down. Salmon farms were damaged and thousands of fish escaped.

On 7 August, the Chilean government declared a state of emergency in the southern half of the country, from Maule Region to Magallanes. The government of Eduardo Frei Ruiz-Tagle sent vice-minister Belisario Velasco to Punta Arenas to monitor the situation in the far south. Chilean Navy ships Aquiles, Chacabuco and Elicura transported fodder and firewood to various localities, in some cases despite severe weather conditions. After the cold spell ended, there were floods as a consequence of the thaw.

== Meteorology ==
In Magallanes Region, the winter of 1995 was somewhat colder and with more precipitation than usual but nothing particularly outstanding. The amounts of snow that fell in Punta Arenas in the whole winter of 1995 was measured at 33.6 cm, less than recorded in 1899, 1904, 1918, 1937 and 1977 when no crisis of the magnitude of the White Earthquake occurred. Scholars Ariel Santana and Wilfried Endlicher claim instead that a higher than usual windspeed was the key factor that triggered the 1995 crisis. News site El Pingüino of Punta Arenas mentions that similar but less severe climatic phenomena occurred in 1937 and 1958.

The direct cause of the White Earthquake was an extremely large subtropical cyclone that moved into Patagonia, influencing the weather as far away as Taltal, Calama and San Pedro de Atacama in northern Chile. This low pressure area was blocked by the South Atlantic High, making its stay over Patagonia for a much longer time than usual for low pressure areas. This created conditions for cold southeasterly winds to enter Patagonia with air at 0°C at sea level and cooler at higher altitudes. As the prevailing winds come from the west, human habitation and nature is poorly prepared for southeasterly winds. Wind formed snowdrifts of up to two meters in some areas.

Communes affected by the White Earthquake
| Region | "Agrarian emergency" | "Zone of catastrophe" |
|---|---|---|
| Maule | Colbún | — |
| Biobío | Santa Bárbara; San Fabián de Alico | Santa Bárbara; San Fabián de Alico; San Carlos; Coihueco; Pinto; El Carmen; Yungay; Pemuco; Tucapel; Antuco; Quilleco; Quilaco |
| Araucanía | Curacautín; Pucón; Lonquimay; Melipeuco; Curarrehue | Angol; Collipulli; Purén; Los Sauces; Vilcún; Cunco; Villarrica; Carahue; Curacautín; Pucón; Lonquimay; Melipeuco; Curarrehue |
| Los Lagos | Palena; Futaleufú; Entre Lagos; Puerto Octay; Lago Ranco; Panguipulli; Futrono; Valdivia | — |
| Aisén | Aisén; Chile Chico; Cisnes; Cochrane; Coihaique; Guaitecas; Lago Verde; O'Higgins; Río Ibáñez; Tortel | — |
| Magallanes | Laguna Blanca; Natales; Navarino; Porvenir; Primavera; Punta Arenas; Río Verde; San Gregorio; Timaukel; Torres del Paine | — |

== See also ==
- Agriculture in Chile
- Climate of Chile
- July 2011 Chilean winter storm
- Patagonian sheep farming boom
