= Alfredo Soto Bunster =

Chilean politician and estate administrator (1888–?)

Member of the Chamber of Deputies
- In office 15 May 1926 – 6 June 1932
- Constituency: 20th Departmental District (Angol, Collipulli, Traiguén, Mariluán)

Personal details
- Born: 16 March 1888 Angol, Chile
- Party: Liberal Party
- Spouse: Rosa Sanhueza Nuggent
- Children: 4
- Occupation: Politician, agricultural professional

Alfredo Soto Bunster (born 16 March 1888 in Angol, Chile – date of death unknown) was a Chilean politician and estate administrator. He served as a member of the Chamber of Deputies of Chile representing the 20th Departmental District (Angol, Collipulli, Traiguén, Mariluán) during the legislative periods 1926–1930 and 1930–1934.

== Early life and education ==
Soto Bunster was born in Angol on 16 March 1888, the son of José Antonio Soto Salas and Emilia Elvira Bunster Villagra. He was one of twelve children born to the couple. His brother, Aníbal Soto Bunster, served as mayor of Angol between 1918 and 1921. He studied at the St. Ignatius College in Santiago and completed two years of architectural studies.

== Career ==
Before entering politics, Soto Bunster was active in agriculture, managing the Itraque estate and the Malleco subsidiary property close to Angol. He was a member of the Liberal Party.

In the 1925 Chilean parliamentary election, Soto Bunster was elected to the Chamber of Deputies of Chile for the 20th Departmental District (Angol, Collipulli, Traiguén, and Mariluán) for the legislative period beginning in 1926. During his first term (1926–1930), he served on the Standing Commission on Budgets and Objectioned Decrees. He was re-elected in 1930 for the 1930–1934 legislative period and served on the Standing Commission on Agriculture and Colonization. His service was interrupted in 1932, when Congress was dissolved in the aftermath of the proclamation of the Socialist Republic of Chile, a short-lived regime established following a military uprising. During this period, legislative authority was suspended and assumed by the Government Junta of Chile, which governed the country until the restoration of constitutional order later that year.

== Personal life ==
He married Rosa Sanhueza Nuggent, and they had four children: José Antonio, Alfredo, Rosa, and Jorge. Soto Bunster was also a member of several social and agricultural organizations, including the National Society of Agriculture, the Club de Concepción, the Society of Primary Instruction, the Club de la Unión, and the Automobile Club of Chile.
