= Jorge Rathgeb =

Chilean politician

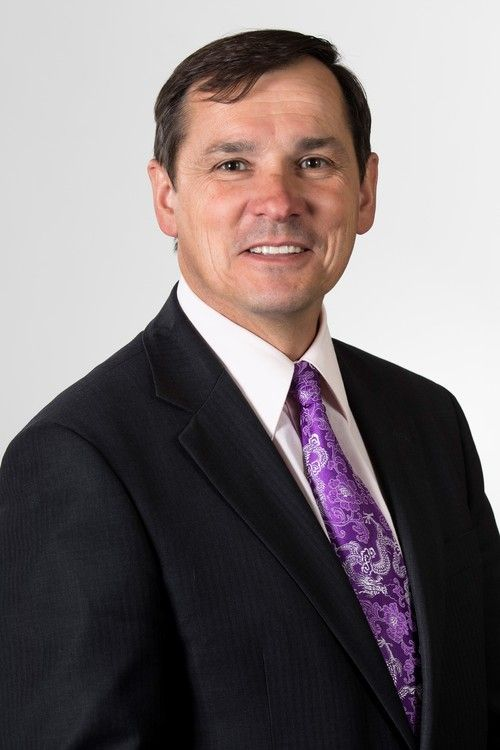

Member of the Chamber of Deputies
- In office 11 March 2018 – 11 March 2026
- Constituency: District 22
- In office 11 March 2010 – 11 March 2018
- Preceded by: Gonzalo Arenas
- Succeeded by: Dissolution of the District
- Constituency: 48th District

Personal details
- Born: 28 December 1967 (age 58) Traiguén, Chile
- Party: Renovación Nacional (RN)
- Spouse: Magaly Leonelli
- Children: Three
- Parent(s): Sergio Rathgeb; Elena Schifferli
- Education: University of Concepción (LL.B)
- Occupation: Politician
- Profession: Lawyer

Jorge Evaldo Rathgeb Schifferli (born 28 December 1967) is a Chilean politician who serves as a member of Chilean Chamber of Deputies. A member of the centre-right party Renovación Nacional (RN), he has served as a Deputy representing the 22nd District (La Araucanía) since 2018, and previously held the same position for District 48 from 2014 to 2018.

He was re-elected in 2022 for the term 2022–2026. Prior to his parliamentary career, he served as a councillor in Traiguén (1996–2010), Governor of Malleco Province (2010–2011), and Regional Seremi of Agriculture in Araucanía during President Sebastián Piñera’s first term.

Rathgeb is noted for his work on agricultural and rural issues, defence of traditional cultural activities like Chilean rodeo, and roles in key investigative commissions during his time in Congress. He has also served as chief of the RN parliamentary caucus, and actively participates in commissions on Agriculture, Emergencies, and Internal Administration.

== Biography ==
Jorge Rathgeb was born on 28 December 1967 in Traiguén to Sergio Rathgeb Rodríguez and Elena Schifferli Luchsinger. He completed his secondary education locally and earned a law degree from the University of Concepción. He also completed postgraduate studies in municipal management and administrative probity.

Before entering national politics, Rathgeb managed his family’s agricultural enterprises and began his public service as a councillor for Traiguén, serving from 1996 to 2010. He was later appointed Governor of Malleco Province (2010–2011) and then served as SEREMI of Agriculture for the Araucanía Region under President Sebastián Piñera.

== Political career ==
Rathgeb joined Renovación Nacional in the 1990s, quickly rising through local party ranks due to his connection with rural communities.

As Governor of Malleco Province, he prioritized rural development and security policies, gaining recognition among agricultural producers. His tenure as Regional SEREMI of Agriculture focused on promoting innovation in farming and supporting small-scale producers.

Elected Deputy in 2013 for District 48 and re-elected en 2017 and 2021 for District 22 after electoral reform, Rathgeb has actively participated in legislative initiatives addressing agriculture, environmental emergencies, and regional development. He is noted for advocating the protection of Chilean rodeo and other cultural traditions.

Rathgeb served as president of the RN parliamentary caucus from 2020 to 2022, during a politically turbulent period marked by internal tensions within the Chile Vamos coalition and ongoing legislative challenges stemming from the social unrest of 2019 and the COVID-19 pandemic.

In this role, he was responsible for coordinating the legislative agenda of the center-right bloc in the Chamber of Deputies, striving to maintain cohesion among RN members from diverse ideological backgrounds (liberal factions to rural-conservative sectors).
