= Andrea Parra =

Chilean nurse and politician

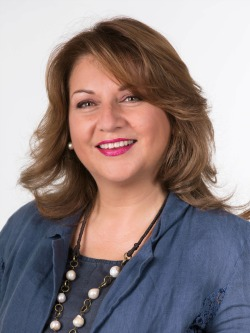
- Andrea Parra in 2018

Member of the Chamber of Deputies
- Incumbent
- Assumed office 11 March 2026
- Constituency: District 22
- In office 11 March 2018 – 11 March 2022
- Constituency: District 22

Governor of Malleco Province
- In office 11 March 2014 – 11 November 2016
- President: Michelle Bachelet
- Preceded by: Erich Baumann Frindt
- Succeeded by: Guillermo Pirce Medina

Councilor of Angol
- In office 11 March 2008 – 11 March 2014

Personal details
- Born: Irle Andrea Parra Sauterel; 2 September 1967 (age 58) Temuco, Chile
- Party: Party for Democracy
- Children: 3
- Education: University of La Frontera
- Occupation: Nurse, politician

Irle Andrea Parra Sauterel (born 2 September 1967) is a Chilean nurse and politician of the Party for Democracy (PPD). She has served as councilor of the municipality of Angol, governor of Malleco Province, and in March 2018 became the first woman to represent her region in the Chamber of Deputies for District 22.

== Biography ==
Andrea Parra was born in Temuco on 2 September 1967, the daughter of Víctor Hugo Parra Hormazábal and Irle Olga Sauterel Schilling. She completed her basic and secondary studies at the Liceo Pablo Neruda in Temuco, graduating in 1984. From 1985 to 1990, she studied at the University of La Frontera, obtaining a nursing degree. She worked professionally at Huequén Family Health Center in Malleco Province, La Araucanía Region. She is divorced and has three children.

== Political career ==
Since 2003, she has been a member of the PPD. Previously, she belonged to the Christian Democratic Party.

In the 2008 municipal elections, she won a seat as councilor for Angol, receiving 913 votes, equivalent to 3.90% of the total.

On 14 March 2014, during the presidency of Michelle Bachelet, she was appointed governor of Malleco Province. On 10 November 2016, she resigned her position to stand as a candidate for deputy.

She was successful in the 2017 general election, becoming a member of the Chamber of Deputies for District 22 for the term 2018–2022 as part of the New Majority coalition. She received 10,312 votes, corresponding to 9.54% of the total votes cast.
