= Troyo =

Hamlet in Chile

- Hamlet
- Country: Chile
- Region: Araucanía
- Province: Malleco
- Comuna: Lonquimay

Population (2017)
  - Total: 163

Troyo is a small hamlet in the Araucania region of Chile, located about 45 km northeast of the town of Lonquimay on the shores of the Bio Bio river. It had a population of 163 in 2017.

The Hamlet was the site of a large fire in 2024 which burned over 816 hectares of land
