= District 22 =

District 22 may refer to:

- District 22 (Chile)
- District 22 (Tehran)
- Texas Senate, District 22
- Florida's 22nd congressional district
- Texas's 22nd congressional district
- New York's 22nd congressional district
- California's 22nd congressional district
- Pennsylvania Senate, District 22
- Ohio's 22nd congressional district
- Maryland Legislative District 22
