= Electoral divisions of Chile =

This article covers the electoral division of Chile, which involves two distinct systems:

1. Chamber of Deputies and Senate: Chile is divided into electoral districts and senatorial constituencies for the election of members of the Chamber of Deputies and the Senate.
2. Regional Councils: For the election of members of the Regional Councils, Chile is divided into provincial constituencies, with each province generally corresponding to one constituency, although some provinces are further divided into multiple constituencies.

The article includes lists of the various electoral structures and divisions in Chile.

== Chamber of Deputies electoral districts ==
The Chamber of Deputies consists of 155 members across 28 electoral districts (distrito electoral), each electing between 3 and 8 deputies. These districts were created in 2015 by merging the previous 60 into larger ones.

District	Region	Communes	Deputies
1	Arica y Parinacota	Arica, Camarones, Putre, General Lagos	3
2	Tarapacá	Iquique, Alto Hospicio, Huara, Camiña, Colchane, Pica, Pozo Almonte	3
3	Antofagasta	Tocopilla, María Elena, Calama, Ollagüe, San Pedro de Atacama, Antofagasta, Mejillones, Sierra Gorda, Taltal	5
4	Atacama	Chañaral, Diego de Almagro, Copiapó, Caldera, Tierra Amarilla, Vallenar, Freirina, Huasco, Alto del Carmen	5
5	Coquimbo	La Serena, La Higuera, Vicuña, Paihuano, Andacollo, Coquimbo, Ovalle, Río Hurtado, Combarbalá, Punitaqui, Monte Patria, Illapel, Salamanca, Los Vilos, Canela	7
6	Valparaíso	La Ligua, Petorca, Cabildo, Papudo, Zapallar, Puchuncaví, Quintero, Nogales, Calera, La Cruz, Quillota, Hijuelas, Los Andes, San Esteban, Calle Larga, Rinconada, San Felipe, Putaendo, Santa María, Panquehue, Llaillay, Catemu, Olmué, Limache, Villa Alemana, Quilpué	8
7	Valparaíso	Valparaíso, Juan Fernández, Isla de Pascua, Viña del Mar, Concón, San Antonio, Santo Domingo, Cartagena, El Tabo, El Quisco, Algarrobo, Casablanca	8
8	Santiago	Colina, Lampa, Tiltil, Quilicura, Pudahuel, Estación Central, Cerrillos, Maipú	8
9	Santiago	Conchalí, Renca, Huechuraba, Cerro Navia, Quinta Normal, Lo Prado, Recoleta, Independencia	7
10	Santiago	Providencia, Ñuñoa, Santiago, Macul, San Joaquín, La Granja	8
11	Santiago	Las Condes, Vitacura, Lo Barnechea, La Reina, Peñalolén	6
12	Santiago	La Florida, Puente Alto, Pirque, San José de Maipo, La Pintana	7
13	Santiago	El Bosque, La Cisterna, San Ramón, Pedro Aguirre Cerda, San Miguel, Lo Espejo	5
14	Santiago	San Bernardo, Buin, Paine, Calera de Tango, Talagante, Peñaflor, El Monte, Isla de Maipo, Melipilla, María Pinto, Curacaví, Alhué, San Pedro, Padre Hurtado	6
15	O'Higgins	Rancagua, Mostazal, Graneros, Codegua, Machalí, Requínoa, Rengo, Olivar, Doñihue, Coinco, Coltauco, Quinta de Tilcoco, Malloa	5
16	O'Higgins	San Fernando, Chimbarongo, San Vicente, Peumo, Pichidegua, Las Cabras, Placilla, Nancagua, Chépica, Santa Cruz, Lolol, Pumanque, Palmilla, Peralillo, Navidad, Litueche, La Estrella, Pichilemu, Marchigüe, Paredones	4
17	Maule	Curicó, Teno, Romeral, Molina, Sagrada Familia, Hualañé, Licantén, Vichuquén, Rauco, Talca, Curepto, Constitución, Empedrado, Pencahue, Maule, San Clemente, Pelarco, Río Claro, San Rafael	7
18	Maule	Linares, Colbún, San Javier, Villa Alegre, Yerbas Buenas, Longaví, Retiro, Parral, Cauquenes, Pelluhue, Chanco	4
19	Ñuble	Chillán, Coihueco, Pinto, San Ignacio, El Carmen, Pemuco, Yungay, Chillán Viejo, San Fabián, Ñiquén, San Carlos, San Nicolás, Ninhue, Quirihue, Cobquecura, Treguaco, Portezuelo, Coelemu, Ránquil, Quillón, Bulnes	5
20	Biobío	Talcahuano, Hualpén, Concepción, San Pedro de la Paz, Chiguayante, Tomé, Penco, Florida, Hualqui, Coronel, Santa Juana	8
21	Biobío	Lota, Lebu, Arauco, Curanilahue, Los Álamos, Cañete, Contulmo, Tirúa, Los Ángeles, Tucapel, Antuco, Quilleco, Alto Biobío, Santa Bárbara, Quilaco, Mulchén, Negrete, Nacimiento, San Rosendo, Laja, Cabrero, Yumbel	5
22	La Araucanía	Angol, Renaico, Collipulli, Ercilla, Los Sauces, Purén, Lumaco, Traiguén, Victoria, Curacautín, Lonquimay, Melipeuco, Vilcún, Lautaro, Perquenco, Galvarino	4
23	La Araucanía	Temuco, Padre Las Casas, Carahue, Nueva Imperial, Saavedra, Cholchol, Teodoro Schmidt, Freire, Pitrufquén, Cunco, Pucón, Curarrehue, Villarrica, Loncoche, Gorbea, Toltén	7
24	Los Ríos	Valdivia, Lanco, Mariquina, Máfil, Corral, Panguipulli, Los Lagos, Futrono, Lago Ranco, Río Bueno, La Unión, Paillaco	5
25	Los Lagos	Osorno, San Juan de la Costa, San Pablo, Puyehue, Río Negro, Purranque, Puerto Octay, Fresia, Frutillar, Llanquihue, Puerto Varas, Los Muermos	4
26	Los Lagos	Puerto Montt, Cochamó, Maullín, Calbuco, Castro, Ancud, Quemchi, Dalcahue, Curaco de Vélez, Quinchao, Puqueldón, Chonchi, Queilén, Quellón, Chaitén, Hualaihué, Futaleufú, Palena	5
27	Aysén	Coihaique, Lago Verde, Aisén, Cisnes, Guaitecas, Chile Chico, Río Ibáñez, Cochrane, O'Higgins, Tortel	3
28	Magallanes	Natales, Torres del Paine, Punta Arenas, Río Verde, Laguna Blanca, San Gregorio, Porvenir, Primavera, Timaukel, Cabo de Hornos, Antártica	3

=== 1990-2018 electoral districts ===
Between 1990 and 2018, there were 60 electoral districts, each electing two deputies. The districts were composed of groups of communes.

District	Region	Communes	Population (2002 census)	% of total population	VAP	Enrolled	Total votes	Valid votes	Turnout	E/VAP	T/VAP	V/VAP
1	Arica and Parinacota	Arica, Camarones, Putre, General Lagos	189,644	1.3%	131,900	111,699	82,438	74,721	73.8%	84.7%	62.5%	56.6%
2	Tarapacá	Iquique, Huara, Camiña, Colchane, Pica, Pozo Almonte, Alto Hospicio	238,950	1.6%	217,175	125,620	100,659	93,105	80.1%	57.8%	46.3%	42.9%
3	Antofagasta	Tocopilla, María Elena, Calama, Ollagüe, San Pedro de Atacama	175,205	1.2%	126,235	94,336	74,572	65,886	79.0%	74.7%	59.1%	52.2%
4	Antofagasta	Antofagasta, Mejillones, Sierra Gorda, Taltal	318,779	2.1%	274,313	148,543	124,270	110,858	83.7%	54.2%	45.3%	40.4%
5	Atacama	Chañaral, Diego de Almagro, Copiapó	161,223	1.1%	128,050	79,247	66,737	61,076	84.2%	61.9%	52.1%	47.7%
6	Atacama	Caldera, Tierra Amarilla, Vallenar, Freirina, Huasco, Alto del Carmen	93,113	0.6%	66,816	57,092	47,856	43,260	83.8%	85.4%	71.6%	64.7%
7	Coquimbo	La Serena, La Higuera, Vicuña, Paiguano, Andacollo	202,335	1.3%	177,984	111,506	97,551	88,930	87.5%	62.6%	54.8%	50.0%
8	Coquimbo	Coquimbo, Ovalle, Río Hurtado	265,896	1.8%	229,291	129,887	114,297	106,372	88.0%	56.6%	49.8%	46.4%
9	Coquimbo	Combarbalá, Punitaqui, Monte Patria, Illapel, Salamanca, Los Vilos, Canela	134,979	0.9%	100,999	78,935	65,760	60,636	83.3%	78.2%	65.1%	60.0%
10	Valparaíso	La Ligua, Petorca, Cabildo, Papudo, Zapallar, Puchuncaví, Quintero, Nogales, Calera, La Cruz, Quillota, Hijuelas	280,655	1.9%	231,725	166,787	151,165	136,805	90.6%	72.0%	65.2%	59.0%
11	Valparaíso	Los Andes, San Esteban, Calle Larga, Rinconada, San Felipe, Putaendo, Santa María, Panquehue, Llaillay, Catemu	223,594	1.5%	186,085	127,631	116,197	106,992	91.0%	68.6%	62.4%	57.5%
12	Valparaíso	Olmué, Limache, Villa Alemana, Quilpué	277,525	1.8%	253,998	155,295	136,331	121,650	87.8%	61.1%	53.7%	47.9%
13	Valparaíso	Valparaíso, Juan Fernández, Isla de Pascua	280,406	1.9%	210,529	173,947	145,787	130,751	83.8%	82.6%	69.2%	62.1%
14	Valparaíso	Viña del Mar, Concón	319,204	2.1%	261,273	202,518	174,962	159,004	86.4%	77.5%	67.0%	60.9%
15	Valparaíso	San Antonio, Santo Domingo, Cartagena, El Tabo, El Quisco, Algarrobo, Casablanca	158,468	1.0%	143,078	102,863	92,954	85,760	90.4%	71.9%	65.0%	59.9%
16	Santiago	Colina, Lampa, Tiltil, Quilicura, Pudahuel	454,969	3.0%	442,415	196,354	181,399	164,475	92.4%	44.4%	41.0%	37.2%
17	Santiago	Conchalí, Renca, Huechuraba	340,844	2.3%	237,603	174,946	157,655	140,469	90.1%	73.6%	66.4%	59.1%
18	Santiago	Cerro Navia, Quinta Normal, Lo Prado	356,640	2.4%	236,121	185,340	166,885	150,425	90.0%	78.5%	70.7%	63.7%
19	Santiago	Recoleta, Independencia	213,699	1.4%	138,808	131,104	115,167	102,642	87.8%	94.4%	83.0%	73.9%
20	Santiago	Estación Central, Cerrillos, Maipú	670,690	4.4%	699,393	294,624	267,571	241,446	90.8%	42.1%	38.3%	34.5%
21	Santiago	Providencia, Ñuñoa	284,385	1.9%	224,404	219,453	190,697	177,839	86.9%	97.8%	85.0%	79.2%
22	Santiago	Santiago	200,792	1.3%	138,022	139,240	119,474	108,786	85.8%	100.9%	86.6%	78.8%
23	Santiago	Las Condes, Vitacura, Lo Barnechea	406,141	2.7%	356,860	256,711	228,983	215,643	89.2%	71.9%	64.2%	60.4%
24	Santiago	La Reina, Peñalolén	312,822	2.1%	248,132	163,297	148,120	135,303	90.7%	65.8%	59.7%	54.5%
25	Santiago	Macul, San Joaquín, La Granja	342,680	2.3%	232,383	181,069	161,616	142,146	89.3%	77.9%	69.5%	61.2%
26	Santiago	La Florida	365,674	2.4%	303,912	168,849	154,173	141,103	91.3%	55.6%	50.7%	46.4%
27	Santiago	El Bosque, La Cisterna, San Ramón	355,618	2.4%	243,119	189,698	169,440	149,776	89.3%	78.0%	69.7%	61.6%
28	Santiago	Pedro Aguirre Cerda, San Miguel, Lo Espejo	306,232	2.0%	203,393	183,352	162,779	146,294	88.8%	90.1%	80.0%	71.9%
29	Santiago	Puente Alto, Pirque, San José de Maipo, La Pintana	712,941	4.7%	659,161	228,013	209,409	184,587	91.8%	34.6%	31.8%	28.0%
30	Santiago	San Bernardo, Buin, Paine, Calera de Tango	378,444	2.5%	322,710	185,875	169,866	152,201	91.4%	57.6%	52.6%	47.2%
31	Santiago	Talagante, Peñaflor, El Monte, Isla de Maipo, Melipilla, María Pinto, Curacaví, Alhué, San Pedro, Padre Hurtado	358,614	2.4%	300,179	195,395	182,129	163,708	93.2%	65.1%	60.7%	54.5%
32	O'Higgins	Rancagua	214,344	1.4%	175,330	108,471	98,630	90,298	90.9%	61.9%	56.3%	51.5%
33	O'Higgins	Mostazal, Graneros, Codegua, Machalí, Requínoa, Rengo, Olivar, Doñihue, Coinco, Coltauco, Quinta de Tilcoco, Malloa	236,358	1.6%	191,752	139,992	130,457	117,289	93.2%	73.0%	68.0%	61.2%
34	O'Higgins	San Fernando, Chimbarongo, San Vicente, Peumo, Pichidegua, Las Cabras	188,247	1.2%	151,199	109,415	101,090	93,894	92.4%	72.4%	66.9%	62.1%
35	O'Higgins	Placilla, Nancagua, Chépica, Santa Cruz, Lolol, Pumanque, Palmilla, Peralillo, Navidad, Litueche, La Estrella, Pichilemu, Marchihue, Paredones	141,678	0.9%	112,478	93,316	84,467	78,037	90.5%	83.0%	75.1%	69.4%
36	Maule	Curicó, Teno, Romeral, Molina, Sagrada Familia, Hualañé, Licantén, Vichuquén, Rauco	244,053	1.6%	198,539	141,956	130,790	119,898	92.1%	71.5%	65.9%	60.4%
37	Maule	Talca	201,797	1.3%	171,840	101,083	90,845	83,967	89.9%	58.8%	52.9%	48.9%
38	Maule	Curepto, Constitución, Empedrado, Pencahue, Maule, San Clemente, Pelarco, Río Claro, San Rafael	151,169	1.0%	116,050	92,478	82,820	76,507	89.6%	79.7%	71.4%	65.9%
39	Maule	Linares, Colbún, San Javier, Villa Alegre, Yerbas Buenas	169,520	1.1%	130,381	103,483	90,468	83,491	87.4%	79.4%	69.4%	64.0%
40	Maule	Longaví, Retiro, Parral, Cauquenes, Pelluhue, Chanco	141,558	0.9%	105,142	91,096	78,463	72,949	86.1%	86.6%	74.6%	69.4%
41	Biobío	Chillán, Coihueco, Pinto, San Ignacio, El Carmen, Pemuco, Yungay, Chillán Viejo	272,081	1.8%	213,455	154,180	136,256	125,991	88.4%	72.2%	63.8%	59.0%
42	Biobío	San Fabián, Ñiquén, San Carlos, San Nicolás, Ninhue, Quirihue, Cobquecura, Treguaco, Portezuelo, Coelemu, Ránquil, Quillón, Bulnes, Cabrero, Yumbel	211,802	1.4%	157,287	142,296	122,545	112,459	86.1%	90.5%	77.9%	71.5%
43	Biobío	Talcahuano, Hualpén	250,348	1.7%	192,901	137,077	118,209	107,257	86.2%	71.1%	61.3%	55.6%
44	Biobío	Concepción, San Pedro de la Paz, Chiguayante	377,810	2.5%	320,848	206,846	180,532	167,843	87.3%	64.5%	56.3%	52.3%
45	Biobío	Tomé, Penco, Florida, Hualqui, Coronel, Santa Juana	235,642	1.6%	188,420	140,963	124,924	113,555	88.6%	74.8%	66.3%	60.3%
46	Biobío	Lota, Lebu, Arauco, Curanilahue, Los Álamos, Cañete, Contulmo, Tirúa	206,344	1.4%	150,714	123,242	106,442	97,420	86.4%	81.8%	70.6%	64.6%
47	Biobío	Los Ángeles, Tucapel, Antuco, Quilleco, Santa Bárbara, Quilaco, Mulchén, Negrete, Nacimiento, San Rosendo, Laja, Alto Biobío	307,535	2.0%	240,503	174,267	150,628	137,868	86.4%	72.5%	62.6%	57.3%
48	Araucanía	Angol, Renaico, Collipulli, Ercilla, Los Sauces, Purén, Lumaco, Traiguén	140,907	0.9%	97,638	88,296	72,931	67,446	82.6%	90.4%	74.7%	69.1%
49	Araucanía	Victoria, Curacautín, Lonquimay, Melipeuco, Vilcún, Lautaro, Perquenco, Galvarino	140,091	0.9%	101,118	89,302	73,425	66,797	82.2%	88.3%	72.6%	66.1%
50	Araucanía	Temuco, Padre Las Casas	304,142	2.0%	265,574	150,388	128,930	120,052	85.7%	56.6%	48.5%	45.2%
51	Araucanía	Carahue, Nueva Imperial, Saavedra, Teodoro Schmidt, Freire, Pitrufquén, Cholchol	142,795	0.9%	106,139	86,895	73,235	67,023	84.3%	81.9%	69.0%	63.1%
52	Araucanía	Cunco, Pucón, Curarrehue, Villarrica, Loncoche, Gorbea, Toltén	141,600	0.9%	112,773	86,261	72,761	67,591	84.3%	76.5%	64.5%	59.9%
53	Los Ríos	Valdivia, Lanco, Mariquina, Máfil, Corral	186,565	1.2%	149,295	107,308	90,736	83,776	84.6%	71.9%	60.8%	56.1%
54	Los Ríos	Panguipulli, Los Lagos, Futrono, Lago Ranco, Río Bueno, La Unión, Paillaco	169,831	1.1%	123,147	98,249	83,748	77,496	85.2%	79.8%	68.0%	62.9%
55	Los Lagos	Osorno, San Juan de la Costa, San Pablo	164,468	1.1%	129,621	97,096	84,502	77,595	87.0%	74.9%	65.2%	59.9%
56	Los Lagos	Puyehue, Río Negro, Purranque, Puerto Octay, Fresia, Frutillar, Llanquihue, Puerto Varas, Los Muermos	151,583	1.0%	114,001	92,626	82,407	76,494	89.0%	81.3%	72.3%	67.1%
57	Los Lagos	Puerto Montt, Cochamó, Maullín, Calbuco	226,951	1.5%	202,368	113,521	97,605	87,526	86.0%	56.1%	48.2%	43.3%
58	Los Lagos	Castro, Ancud, Quemchi, Dalcahue, Curaco de Vélez, Quinchao, Puqueldón, Chonchi, Queilén, Quellón, Chaitén, Hualaihué, Futaleufú, Palena	173,737	1.1%	144,130	97,470	82,926	75,564	85.1%	67.6%	57.5%	52.4%
59	Aisén	Coihaique, Lago Verde, Aisén, Cisnes, Guaitecas, Chile Chico, Río Ibáñez, Cochrane, O'Higgins, Tortel	91,492	0.6%	72,475	58,540	43,734	40,961	74.7%	80.8%	60.3%	56.5%
60	Magallanes	Natales, Torres del Paine, Punta Arenas, Río Verde, Laguna Blanca, San Gregorio, Porvenir, Primavera, Timaukel, Cabo de Hornos, Antártica	150,826	1.0%	116,734	99,847	72,132	66,163	72.2%	85.5%	61.8%	56.7%

Notes: "VAP" is voting age population (population 18 and above on 13 December 2009); "Valid votes" is equal to "Total votes" minus null votes and blank votes; "T" are total votes; "E" is enrolled population; "V" are valid votes. The voting results are for the 13 December 2009 Chamber of Deputies election.

== Senatorial constituencies ==
The Senate consists of 50 members, with each region forming a senatorial constituency (circunscripción senatorial). Each constituency elects between 2 and 5 senators.

Sen. const.	Region	Senators
1°	Arica and Parinacota	2
2°	Tarapacá	2
3°	Antofagasta	3
4°	Atacama	2
5°	Coquimbo	3
6°	Valparaíso	5
7°	Santiago	5
8°	O'Higgins	3
9°	Maule	5
10°	Biobío	3
11°	La Araucanía	5
12°	Los Ríos	3
13°	Los Lagos	3
14°	Aysén	2
15°	Magallanes	2
16°	Ñuble	2

=== 1990-2018 senatorial constituencies ===
Before 2018, there were 19 senatorial constituencies. Each region constituted a senatorial constituency, except for the Valparaíso, Santiago, Maule, Biobío, and La Araucanía regions, which were each divided into two senatorial constituencies. Each senatorial constituency elected two senators. Constituencies that did not correspond to full regions were made up of several electoral districts within a region.

In 2009, the Constitution was amended to ensure that each region constituted at least one senatorial constituency. Before the law defining senatorial constituencies was updated to reflect this change, the list was as follows:

Sen. const.	Informal name	Geographical composition	Last election
1	—	Arica and Parinacota Region (XV), Tarapacá Region (I)	2009
2	—	Antofagasta Region (II)	2013
3	—	Atacama Region (III)	2009
4	—	Coquimbo Region (IV)	2013
5	Valparaíso Cordillera	Districts 10, 11 and 12 of Valparaíso Region (V)	2009
6	Valparaíso Coast	Districts 13, 14 and 15 of Valparaíso Region (V)	2009
7	Santiago West	Districts 16, 17, 18, 19, 20, 22, 30 and 31 of Santiago Metropolitan Region (RM)	2013
8	Santiago East	Districts 21, 23, 24, 25, 26, 27, 28 and 29 of Santiago Metropolitan Region (RM)	2013
9	—	O'Higgins Region (VI)	2013
10	Maule North	Districts 36, 37 and 38 of Maule Region (VII)	2009
11	Maule South	Districts 39 and 40 of Maule Region (VII)	2009
12	Biobío Coast	Districts 42, 43, 44 and 45 of Biobío Region (VIII)	2013
13	Biobío Cordillera	Districts 41, 46 and 47 of Biobío Region (VIII)	2013
14	Araucanía North	Districts 48 and 49 of Araucanía Region (IX)	2009
15	Araucanía South	Districts 50, 51 and 52 of Araucanía Region (IX)	2009
16	—	Los Ríos Region (XIV) [Before August 15, 2009: Los Ríos Region (XIV) and district 55 of Los Lagos Region (X)]	2013
17	—	Los Lagos Region (X) [Before August 15, 2009: Districts 56, 57 and 58 of Los Lagos Region (X)]	2013
18	—	Aisén Region (XI)	2009
19	—	Magallanes Region (XII)	2013

== Provincial constituencies ==
There are 64 provincial constituencies (circunscripción provincial). Each province constitutes a provincial constituency, except Valparaíso, Santiago, Cachapoal, Concepción and Cautín, which are divided into two, six, two, three and two constituencies, respectively. The number of regional advisors each constituency elects depends on its population.

Region	Provincial constituencies	Advisors
Arica and Parinacota	Arica, Parinacota	14
Tarapacá	El Tamarugal, Iquique	14
Antofagasta	Antofagasta, El Loa, Tocopilla	16
Atacama	Chañaral, Copiapó, Huasco	14
Coquimbo	Choapa, Elqui, Limarí	16
Valparaíso	Isla de Pascua, Los Andes, Marga Marga, Petorca, Quillota, San Antonio, San Felipe de Aconcagua, Valparaíso I, Valparaíso II	28
Santiago	Chacabuco, Cordillera, Maipo, Melipilla, Santiago I, Santiago II, Santiago III, Santiago IV, Santiago V, Santiago VI, Talagante	34
O'Higgins	Cachapoal I, Cachapoal II, Cardenal Caro, Colchagua	16
Maule	Cauquenes, Curicó, Linares, Talca	20
Biobío	Arauco, Biobío, Concepción I, Concepción II, Concepción III, Ñuble	28
Araucanía	Cautín I, Cautín II, Malleco	20
Los Ríos	Ranco, Valdivia	14
Los Lagos	Chiloé, Llanquihue, Osorno, Palena	16
Aisén	Aisén, Capitán Prat, Coihaique, General Carrera	14
Magallanes	Antártica Chilena, Magallanes, Tierra del Fuego, Última Esperanza	14

The following five provinces are divided into two to six provincial constituencies, each containing a number of communes:

- Valparaíso Province
  - Valparaíso I: Puchuncaví, Quintero, Concón, and Viña del Mar.
  - Valparaíso II: Juan Fernández, Valparaíso, and Casablanca.
  Santiago Province
  - Santiago I: Pudahuel, Quilicura, Conchalí, Huechuraba, and Renca.
  - Santiago II: Independencia, Recoleta, Santiago, Quinta Normal, Cerro Navia, and Lo Prado.
  - Santiago III: Maipú, Cerrillos, and Estación Central.
  - Santiago IV: Ñuñoa, Providencia, Las Condes, Vitacura, Lo Barnechea, and La Reina.
  - Santiago V: Peñalolén, La Granja, Macul, San Joaquín, and La Florida.
  - Santiago VI: El Bosque, La Cisterna, San Ramón, Lo Espejo, Pedro Aguirre Cerda, San Miguel, and La Pintana.
  Cachapoal Province
  - Cachapoal I: Rancagua.
  - Cachapoal II: Mostazal, Graneros, Codegua, Machalí, Olivar, Doñihue, Coltauco, Las Cabras, Peumo, Coinco, Malloa, Quinta de Tilcoco, Rengo, Requínoa, Pichidegua, and San Vicente.
  Concepción Province
  - Concepción I: Tomé, Penco, Hualpén, and Talcahuano.
  - Concepción II: Chiguayante, Concepción, and Florida.
  - Concepción III: San Pedro de la Paz, Coronel, Lota, Hualqui, and Santa Juana.
  Cautín Province
  - Cautín I: Temuco, and Padre Las Casas.
  - Cautín II: Galvarino, Lautaro, Perquenco, Vilcún, Melipeuco, Carahue, Cholchol, Freire, Nueva Imperial, Pitrufquén, Saavedra, Teodoro Schmidt, Cunco, Curarrehue, Gorbea, Loncoche, Pucón, Toltén, and Villarrica.

== See also ==
- Elections in Chile
- Administrative divisions of Chile
