= Malalcahuello =

Town in Chile

- Village
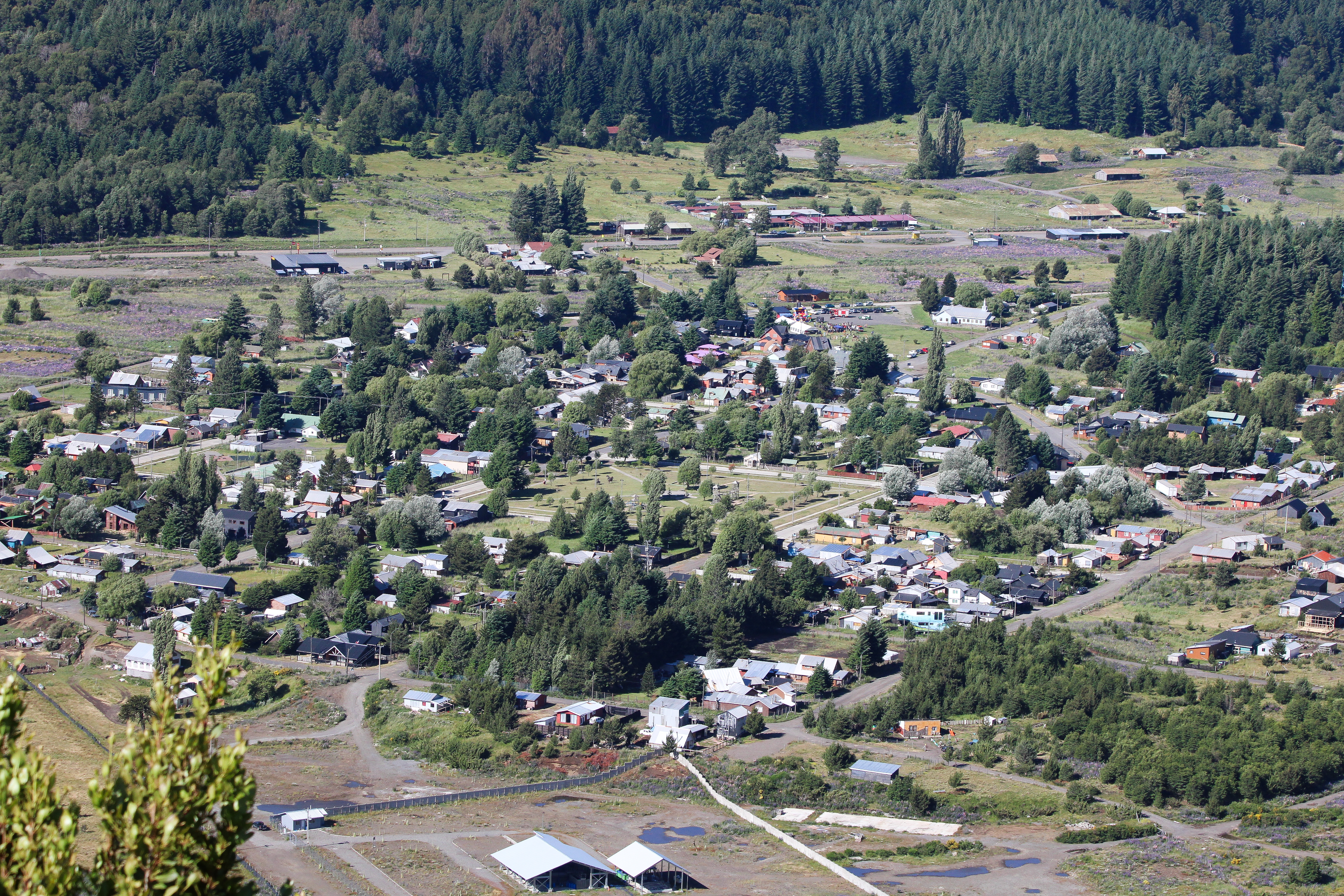
- Etymology: From Mapuche Malal (Corral) and Kawellu (Horse)
- Interactive map of Malalcahuello
- Country: Chile
- Region: Araucanía
- Province: Malleco
- Comuna: Curacautin
- Elevation: 972 m (3,189 ft)

Population (2017)
  - Total: 415

Malalcahuello is a mountain village located in the Curacautin commune on La Araucania, Chile, about 120km from Temuco and 70km from the Pino Hachado Pass. It is located adjacent to the Malalcahuello/Nalcas Nature Reserve and has an elevation of 972 meters above sea level. The town is also located near the Lonquimay volcano and the Corralco ski resort. It had a population of 415 people in 2017.
