= University of La Frontera =

Chilean public university

Coordinates: 38.7474°S 72.6177°W

University of the Frontier
- Universidad de La Frontera
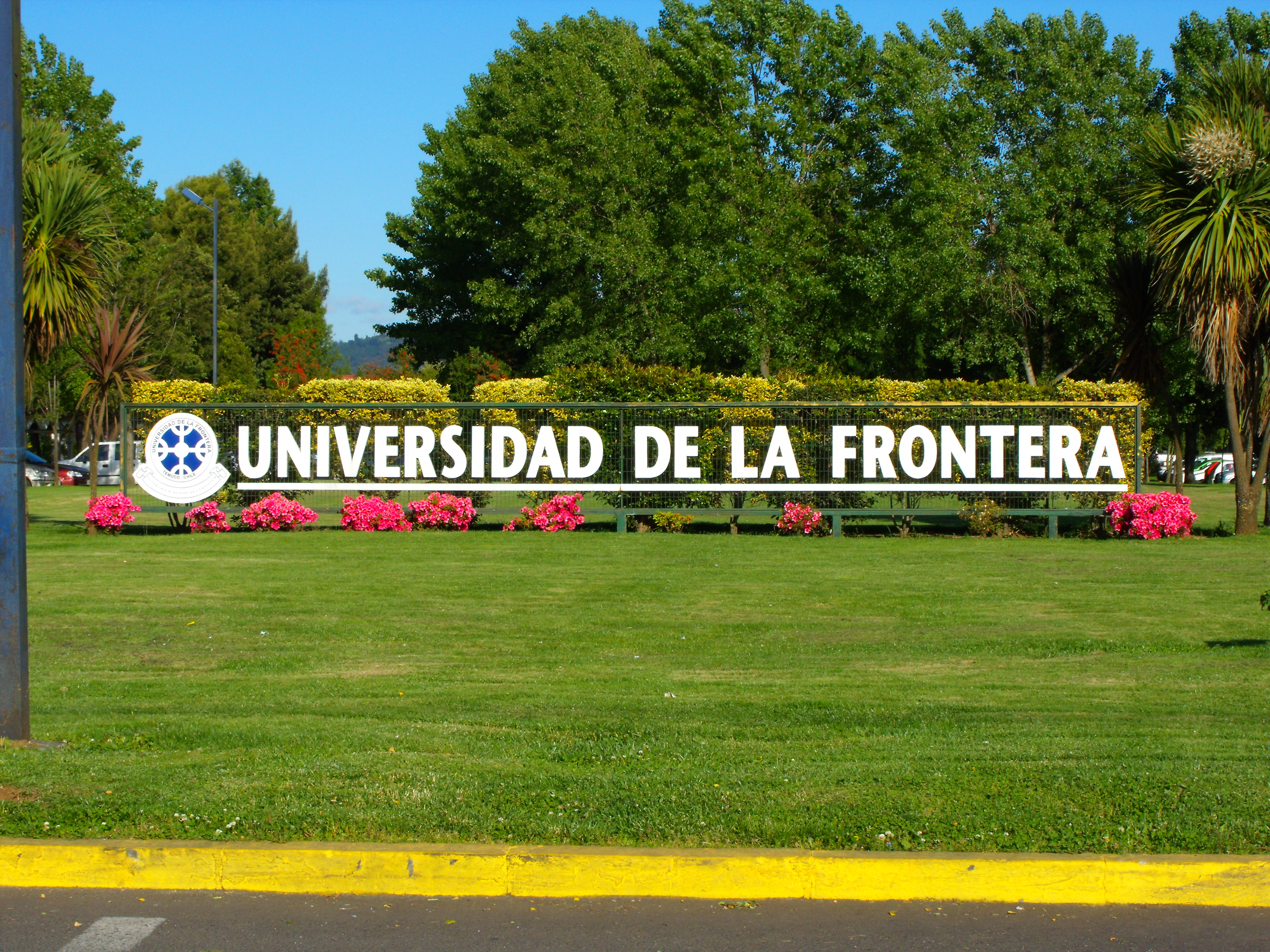
- Motto: Itinerarium mentis ad veritatem
- Established: 1981
- Affiliations: Consejo de Rectores de las Universidades Chilenas; Consorcio de Universidades Estatales de Chile
- Students: 11,053 (2020)
- Undergraduates: 10,427
- Postgraduates: 626
- Location: Temuco, Chile
- Campus: Andres Bello Campus, Medicine Campus
- Website: www.ufro.cl

Universidad de La Frontera, or UFRO, is a public university in Temuco, Araucanía Region, Chile. It is a derivative university and part of the Chilean Traditional Universities. UFRO boasts a student body with a variety of abilities and from a variety of backgrounds, many of whom are Mapuche descent. The University of La Frontera is part of the Consortium of Universities of the State of Chile (Consorcio de Universidades del Estado de Chile, CUECH).

== Facilities ==
The university owns a property called Rucamanque Ecological and Cultural Park, that is used for research, environmental education, and conservation. Rucamanque holds old-growth and second-growth forest.

== Notable alumni ==
- Pedro Cayuqueo, Mapuche activist and journalist
- Gloria Dünkler, writer and recipient of the 2016 Pablo Neruda Award
- Natividad Llanquileo, attorney, Mapuche activist, and member of the Chilean Constitutional Convention (2021–present)
- Elisa Loncón, academic, Mapuche activist, and President of the Chilean Constitutional Convention (2021–2022)
- Andrea Parra, member of the Chamber of Deputies of Chile (2018–present) and former Governor of the Malleco Province (2014–2016)
- Jorge Saffirio, member of the Chamber of Deputies of Chile (2022–present) and former Governor of the Malleco Province (2008-2010)
