= Diego Paulsen =

Chilean politician

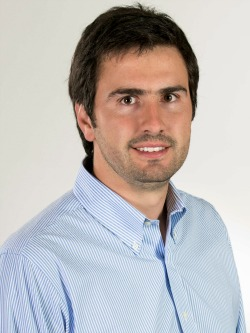
- Official portrait, 2018

Ambassador of Chile to the United Kingdom
- Incumbent
- Assumed office 26 June 2026
- President: José Antonio Kast
- Preceded by: Ximena Fuentes

President of the Chamber of Deputies
- In office 7 April 2020 – 11 March 2022
- Vice President: Francisco Undurraga; Rodrigo González Torres
- Preceded by: Iván Flores
- Succeeded by: Raúl Soto

Member of the Chamber of Deputies
- In office 11 March 2018 – 11 March 2022
- Preceded by: District established
- Constituency: District 22
- In office 11 March 2014 – 11 March 2018
- Preceded by: Enrique Estay
- Succeeded by: District dissolved
- Constituency: District 49 of Araucanía

Personal details
- Born: 1 August 1987 (age 39) Temuco, Chile
- Party: National Renewal
- Spouse: María Valentina García
- Children: 2
- Education: Adolfo Ibáñez University; Pontifical Catholic University of Valparaíso (PgD)
- Occupation: Politician
- Profession: Lawyer
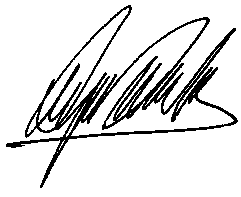
- Signature

Diego Alfredo Paulsen Kehr (born 1 August 1987) is a Chilean lawyer and National Renewal politician who serves as ambassador of Chile to the United Kingdom since June 2026.

Paulsen served as a deputy from 2014 to 2022, representing the former District 49 during his first term, and District 22 during his second term, both in the Araucanía Region. From 2020 to 2022, he also served as President of the Chamber of Deputies, the youngest person in the Chamber's history to hold the position.

== Early life and education ==
Paulsen was born on 1 August 1987 in Temuco, to a family of Danish and German descent. He graduated from Adolfo Ibáñez University as lawyer and earned a postgraduate diploma in law and parliamentary administration at the Pontifical Catholic University of Valparaíso.

== Career ==
Paulsen worked as a legal consultant for various businesses from 2007 to 2012. In 2012, he began working as a consultant for National Renewal's parliamentary committee. The following year, Paulsen won the primaries and became a congressional candidate for the 49th district of the Araucanía Region. Paulsen was elected with 26.26% of the votes and began his term as a member of the Chamber of Deputies in 2014.

Paulsen presided an investigative commission regarding the University of Art & Social Sciences (ARCIS) and its accreditation process. He was also part of an investigative commission regarding public spending on primary health care and hospital infrastructure.

In 2017, he was reelected to the Chamber of the Deputies representing District 22 of the Araucanía Region. On 7 April 2020, Paulsen became the youngest person to serve as President of the Chamber of Deputies, at the age of 32, and held the position until the end of his term as a deputy in 2022.

On 26 June 2026 he was appointed as ambassador of Chile to the United Kingdom by President José Antonio Kast.

== Political positions ==
=== Abortion ===
Paulsen is against abortion. In 2017, he voted against a bill that sought to legalize abortion under special circumstances.

=== Death penalty ===
In 2016, Paulsen voted in favor of a bill that attempted to reinstate the death penalty in Chile. The bill was rejected in the Chamber of Deputies with 111 votes against and 13 votes in favor.

=== Same-sex marriage ===
In a 2014 interview with The Clinic, Paulsen stated that he was against same-sex marriage but in favor of civil unions.
