= Curacautín Airport =

Airport in Chile

Curacautin Airport
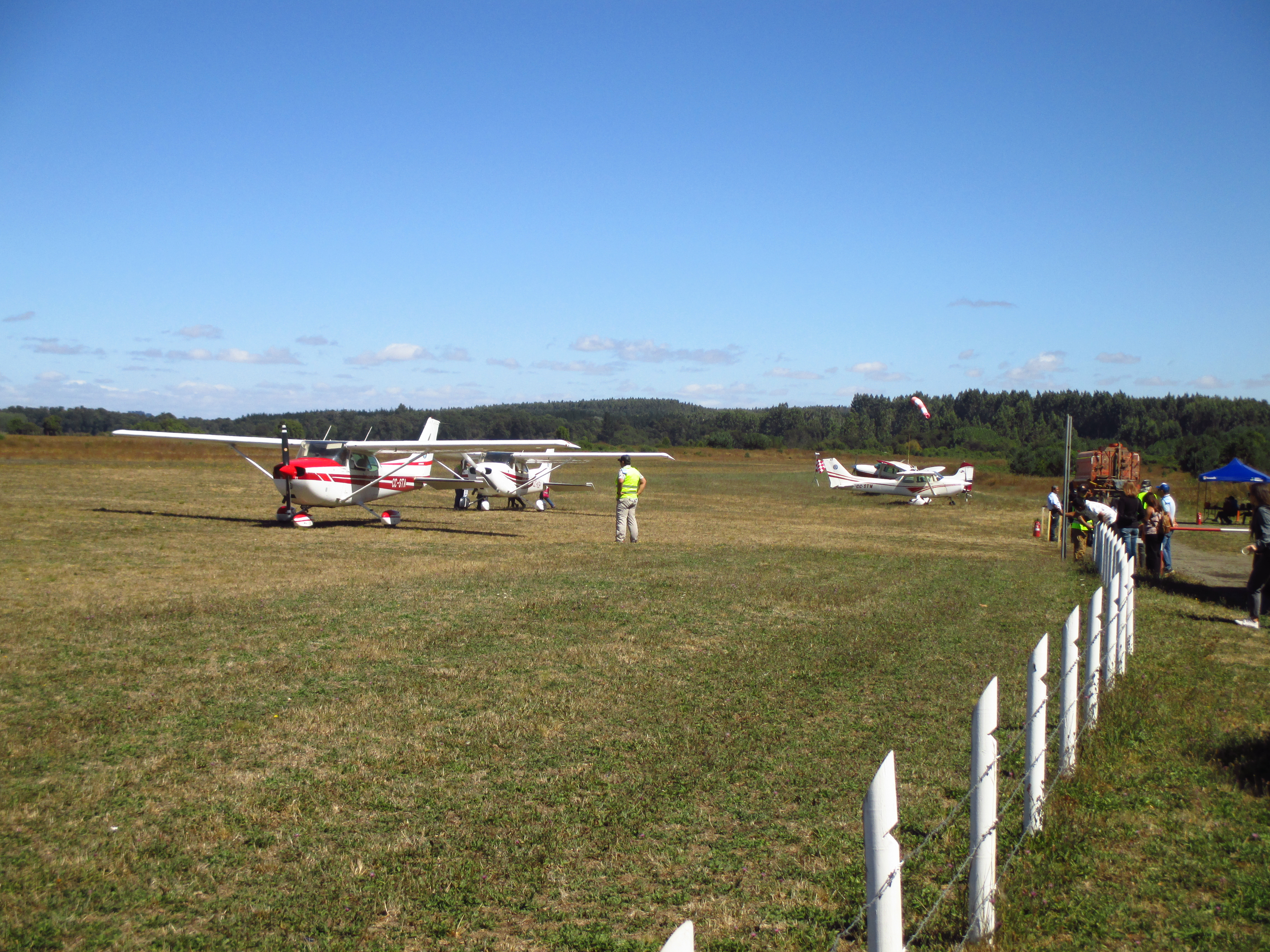
- IATA: none; ICAO: SCAI

Summary
- Airport type: Private
- Owner/Operator: Curacautin Air Club
- Serves: Curacautin
- Elevation AMSL: 1,667 ft / 508 m
- Interactive map of Curacautin Airport

Runways
Direction	Length		Surface
Direction	ft	m	Surface
10/28	2,591	790	Gravel

Curacautín Airfield (ICAO:SCAI) is a private use airfield located 2 miles west of the town of Curacautin. It is owned and operated by the Curacautin Air Club. In the year 2022 it was the site of an arson attack by Mapuche extremists, resulting in the destruction of 3 aircraft and the Air Club´s Hangar
