= Río Negro (Los Lagos) =

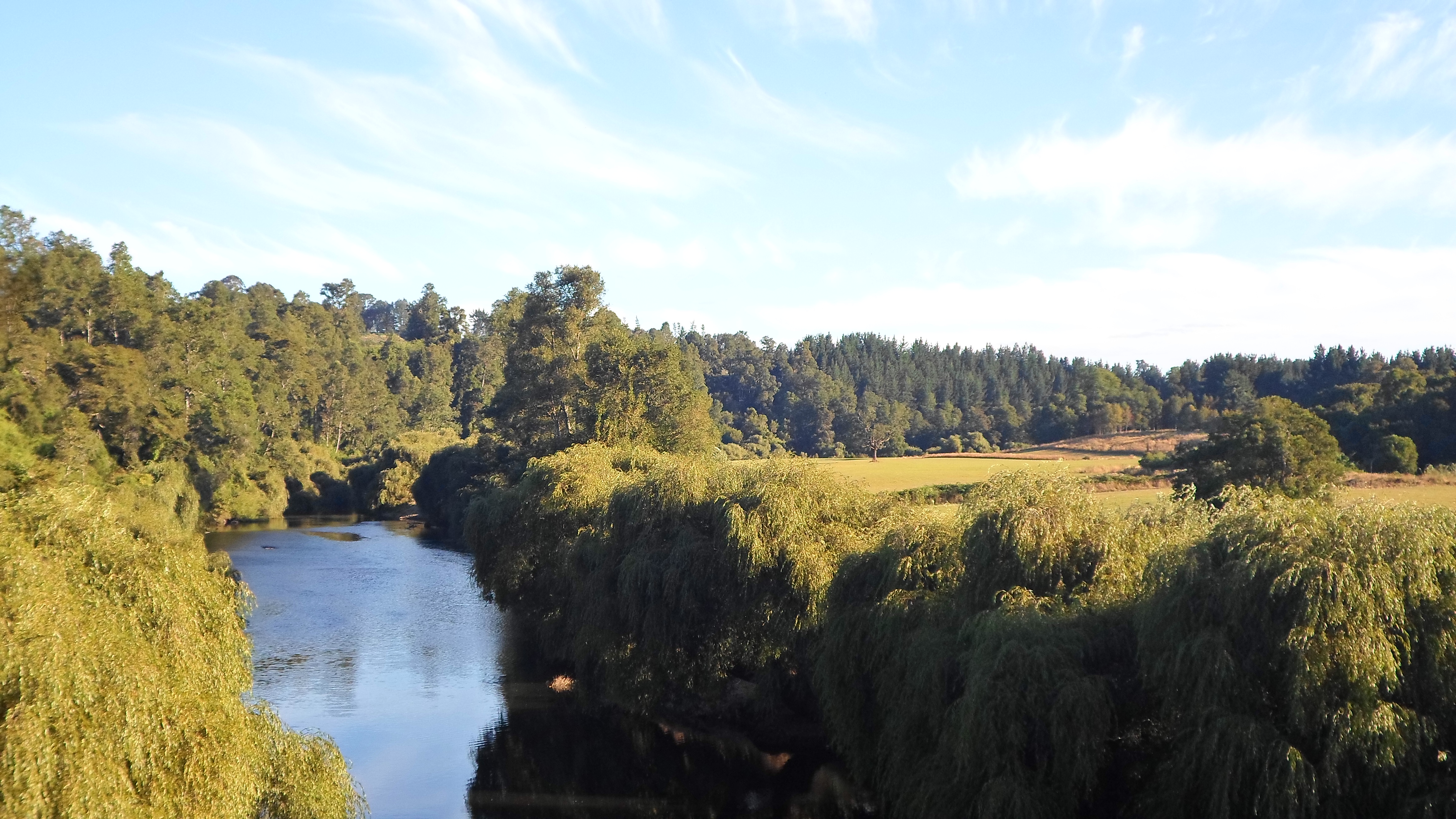

Location
- Country: Chile

Physical characteristics
- Source
  - location: Coastal Precordillera
- Mouth
  - location: Rahue River, Chile
  - coordinates: 40°37′42″S 73°11′16″W
  - elevation: 26 m (85 ft)

The Río Negro (Spanish for "black river") is one of the principal tributaries of the Rahue River in southern Chile. It runs from south to north draining part of the eastern slopes of Cordillera Pelada. The commune of Río Negro derives its name from the river.

== See also ==
- List of rivers of Chile
