= Victoria, Chile =

Victoria
- City and Commune
- Flag Coat of arms Map of Victoria commune in the La Araucanía Region Location in Chile
- Coordinates: 38°14′S 72°20′W
- Country: Chile
- Region: La Araucanía
- Province: Malleco
- Founded: 1881

Government
  - Type: Municipality
  - Alcalde: Aaron Taylor (ILA)

Area
  - Total: 1,256 km^{2} (485 sq mi)
- Elevation: 334 m (1,096 ft)

Population (2012 Census)
  - Total: 32,448
  - Density: 25.83/km^{2} (66.91/sq mi)
  - Urban: 23,977
  - Rural: 9,524
- Demonym: Victorienes

Sex
  - Men: 16,423
  - Women: 17,078
- Time zone: UTC−4 (CLT)
  - Summer (DST): UTC−3 (CLST)
- Area code: 56 + 45
- Website: Official website (in Spanish)

Victoria is a city and commune in Malleco Province of La Araucanía Region, Chile. It is the second most populous city in the Malleco Province, and is the gateway to the area known as Araucanía Andina, with attractions such as the Tolhuaca National Park, the Tolhuaca Hot Springs, Malalcahuello National Reserve, and the communes of Curacautín and Lonquimay. The climate is influenced by the vicinity of the temperate rainforest in Chile.

== History ==
Victoria was founded in 1881 by Bernardo Muñoz Vargas by order of General Gregorio Urrutia, on a plateau overlooking the Traiguén River valley.

=== The beginning ===
The city was extremely underdeveloped when it was first established in 1881, with only a few huts and a little amount of trade, mostly for the fort's garrison. In 1883, Swiss settlers arrived in Victoria.

The commander of the fort, Bernardo Muñoz Vargas was responsible for some of the early urban planning. Creating some dumps, open streets, and a wooden bridge crossing the nearby river Traiguén.

The Swiss settlers were followed by Germans in Valdivia, who established a mill and a brewery on the banks of Traiguén; and exploited the extensive virgin forest creating some sawmills.

== Demographics ==
Historical population
Year	Pop.	±% p.a.
1895	19,787	—
1907	23,416	+1.41%
1920	20,471	−1.03%
1930	21,509	+0.50%
1940	21,985	+0.22%
1952	23,090	+0.41%
1960	26,874	+1.92%
1970	28,356	+0.54%
1982	31,530	+0.89%
1992	32,979	+0.45%
2002	33,501	+0.16%
2017	34,182	+0.13%
2024	34,464	+0.12%
Source: "Censo de Población y Vivienda". National Statistics Institute.

According to the 2002 census of the National Statistics Institute, Victoria spans an area of 1,256 km^{2} (485 sq mi) and has 33,501 inhabitants (16,423 men and 17,078 women). Of these, 23,977 (71.6%) lived in urban areas and 9,524 (28.4%) in rural areas. The population grew by 1.6% (522 persons) between the 1992 and 2002 censuses.

The main settlements of the commune are the city of Victoria and the villages of Selva Oscura, Púa and Quino.

== Attractions ==
Some snowcapped volcanoes of the Andes, such as the Tolhuaca, Lonquimay, Sierra Nevada and the Llaima, can be seen from Victoria, forming an enormous backdrop for the city.

== Economy ==
Its economy is based mainly on agriculture, livestock, dairy and export of agricultural products, forestry, trade and services. Its privileged location in the center of the Province, close to the regional capital, Temuco, permits an expedite connection with the main national routes such as railways and Chile Route 5. It is also located halfway along the bi-oceanic corridor between the Pacific Ocean and Argentina across the Pino Hachado Pass.

== Administration ==
As a commune, Victoria is a third-level administrative division of Chile administered by a municipal council, headed by an alcalde who is directly elected every four years. The 2008-2012 alcalde is Hugo Monsalve Castillo (ILA).

Within the electoral divisions of Chile, Victoria is represented in the Chamber of Deputies by Enrique Estay (UDI) and Fuad Chahín (PDC) as part of the 49th electoral district, together with Curacautín, Lonquimay, Melipeuco, Vilcún, Lautaro, Perquenco and Galvarino. The commune is represented in the Senate by Alberto Espina Otero (RN) and Jaime Quintana Leal (PPD) as part of the 14th senatorial constituency (Araucanía-North).

== Climate ==
Climate data for Victoria, elevation 360 m (1,180 ft)
Month	Jan	Feb	Mar	Apr	May	Jun	Jul	Aug	Sep	Oct	Nov	Dec	Year
Mean daily maximum °C (°F)	25.6 (78.1)	26.1 (79.0)	21.5 (70.7)	17.5 (63.5)	13.3 (55.9)	10.7 (51.3)	10.1 (50.2)	12.0 (53.6)	14.3 (57.7)	17.2 (63.0)	21.1 (70.0)	24.3 (75.7)	17.8 (64.1)
Daily mean °C (°F)	18.7 (65.7)	18.1 (64.6)	15.4 (59.7)	12.3 (54.1)	9.4 (48.9)	7.3 (45.1)	6.8 (44.2)	7.4 (45.3)	9.5 (49.1)	11.8 (53.2)	15.5 (59.9)	16.4 (61.5)	12.4 (54.3)
Mean daily minimum °C (°F)	7.9 (46.2)	7.9 (46.2)	7.2 (45.0)	5.3 (41.5)	4.6 (40.3)	3.6 (38.5)	2.1 (35.8)	2.4 (36.3)	2.9 (37.2)	4.2 (39.6)	5.9 (42.6)	7.2 (45.0)	5.1 (41.2)
Average precipitation mm (inches)	74.2 (2.92)	23.3 (0.92)	51.7 (2.04)	95.6 (3.76)	214.6 (8.45)	175.2 (6.90)	245.1 (9.65)	160.0 (6.30)	98.9 (3.89)	79.7 (3.14)	57.4 (2.26)	43.6 (1.72)	1,319.3 (51.95)
Average relative humidity (%)	62	61	66	77	89	92	85	84	82	79	70	62	76
Source: Bioclimatografia de Chile
