= Perquenco =

- Town and Commune
- Map of Perquenco commune in Araucania Region Location in Chile
- Coordinates (town): 38°25′S 72°23′W
- Country: Chile
- Region: Araucanía
- Province: Cautín

Government
  - Type: Municipality
  - Alcalde: Luis Alberto Muñoz Pérez (PDC)

Area
  - Total: 330.7 km^{2} (127.7 sq mi)
- Elevation: 278 m (912 ft)

Population (2012 Census)
  - Total: 6,530
  - Density: 19.7/km^{2} (51.1/sq mi)
  - Urban: 2,929
  - Rural: 3,521

Sex
  - Men: 3,281
  - Women: 3,169
- Time zone: UTC-4 (CLT)
  - Summer (DST): UTC-3 (CLST)
- Area code: (+56) 45
- Website: Municipality of Perquenco

Perquenco is a town and commune in the Cautín Province of southern Chile's Araucanía Region. The town was declared capital of the unrecognized Kingdom of Araucanía and Patagonia by Orélie-Antoine de Tounens, but soon after it was occupied by Cornelio Saavedra Rodríguez who was in charge of the Chilean occupation of the Araucanía.

== Demographics ==
Historical population
Year	Pop.	±% p.a.
1885	3,000	—
1895	4,392	+3.89%
1907	4,386	−0.01%
1920	4,568	+0.31%
1930	5,225	+1.35%
1940	5,355	+0.25%
1952	5,318	−0.06%
1970	5,381	+0.07%
1982	5,971	+0.87%
1992	5,886	−0.14%
2002	6,450	+0.92%
2017	6,905	+0.46%
2024	7,438	+1.07%
Source: "Censo de Población y Vivienda". National Statistics Institute.

According to the 2002 census of the National Statistics Institute, Perquenco spans an area of 330.7 km^{2} (128 sq mi) and has 6,450 inhabitants (3,281 men and 3,169 women). Of these, 2,929 (45.4%) lived in urban areas and 3,521 (54.6%) in rural areas. The population grew by 9.6% (564 persons) between the 1992 and 2002 censuses.

== Administration ==
As a commune, Perquenco is a third-level administrative division of Chile administered by a municipal council, headed by an alcalde who is directly elected every four years. The 2008-2012 alcalde is Luis Alberto Muñoz Pérez (PDC).

Within the electoral divisions of Chile, Perquenco is represented in the Chamber of Deputies by Enrique Estay (UDI) and Fuad Chahín (PDC) as part of the 49th electoral district, together with Victoria, Curacautín, Lonquimay, Melipeuco, Vilcún, Lautaro and Galvarino. The commune is represented in the Senate by Alberto Espina Otero (RN) and Jaime Quintana Leal (PPD) as part of the 14th senatorial constituency (Araucanía-North).
