= Lonquimay =

- Town and Commune
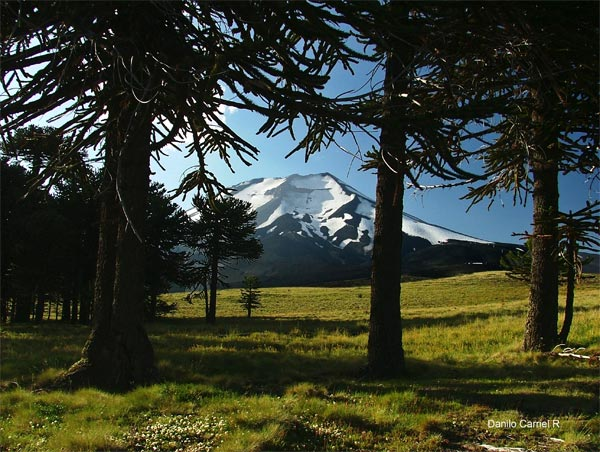
- Summer in Lonquimay

- Location of the Lonquimay commune in the Araucanía Region Location in Chile
- Coordinates (city): 38°26′S 71°14′W
- Country: Chile
- Region: Araucanía
- Province: Malleco

Government
  - Type: Municipality
  - Alcalde: Guillermo Vásquez Veroiza (PPD)

Area
  - Total: 3,914.2 km^{2} (1,511.3 sq mi)
- Elevation: 925 m (3,035 ft)

Population (2012 Census)
  - Total: 9,925
  - Density: 2.536/km^{2} (6.567/sq mi)
  - Urban: 3,435
  - Rural: 6,802

Sex
  - Men: 5,414
  - Women: 4,823
- Time zone: UTC-4 (CLT)
  - Summer (DST): UTC-3 (CLST)
- Area code: 56 + 45
- Website: Municipality of Lonquimay

Lonquimay is a town and commune in the Malleco Province of southern Chile's Araucanía Region.

== Transport ==
It is the terminus of an abandoned 1,676 mm (5 ft 6 in) broad gauge railway project which supporters cited as the most practical railway route through the Andes to Argentina, but which lacks a link between Lonquimay and Zapala in Argentina; revival of the project was announced in 2005 and progress begun within Chile. The line includes Chile's longest tunnel measuring 4,563 m (4,990 yd).

== Demographics ==
Historical population
Year	Pop.	±% p.a.
1895	625	—
1907	3,331	+14.96%
1920	3,121	−0.50%
1930	4,835	+4.47%
1940	6,675	+3.28%
1952	7,556	+1.04%
1970	9,101	+1.04%
1982	9,694	+0.53%
1992	9,099	−0.63%
2002	10,237	+1.19%
2017	10,251	+0.01%
2024	10,247	−0.01%
Source: "Censo de Población y Vivienda". National Statistics Institute.

According to the 2002 census of the National Statistics Institute, Lonquimay spans an area of 3,914.2 km^{2} (1,511 sq mi) and has 10,237 inhabitants (5,414 men and 4,823 women). Of these, 3,435 (33.6%) lived in urban areas and 6,802 (66.4%) in rural areas. The population grew by 12.5% (1,138 persons) between the 1992 and 2002 censuses.

== Administration ==
As a commune, Lonquimay is a third-level administrative division of Chile administered by a municipal council, headed by an alcalde who is directly elected every four years. The 2008-2012 alcalde is Guillermo Vásquez Veroiza (PPD).

Within the electoral divisions of Chile, Lonquimay is represented in the Chamber of Deputies by Enrique Estay (UDI) and Fuad Chahín (PDC) as part of the 49th electoral district, together with Victoria, Curacautín, Melipeuco, Vilcún, Lautaro, Perquenco and Galvarino. The commune is represented in the Senate by Alberto Espina Otero (RN) and Jaime Quintana Leal (PPD) as part of the 14th senatorial constituency (Araucanía-North).

== Geography ==
=== Climate ===
Located in the Andes, at 900 metres (3,000 ft) above sea level, Lonquimay has a temperate oceanic climate (Köppen climate classification: Cfb), with an average annual precipitation of 1,990 millimetres (78 in). Summers have warm days and chilly to cool nights. Winters are chilly and wetter, with heavy snowfall. This climate favors winter sports, and at the foot of the Lonquimay is The Corralco Mountain and Ski Resort.

Climate data for Longquimay, elevation 900 m (3,000 ft)
Month	Jan	Feb	Mar	Apr	May	Jun	Jul	Aug	Sep	Oct	Nov	Dec	Year
Mean daily maximum °C (°F)	25.4 (77.7)	24.7 (76.5)	22.0 (71.6)	17.7 (63.9)	11.9 (53.4)	6.7 (44.1)	6.7 (44.1)	9.0 (48.2)	13.3 (55.9)	17.4 (63.3)	19.7 (67.5)	22.4 (72.3)	16.4 (61.5)
Daily mean °C (°F)	15.1 (59.2)	14.3 (57.7)	12.1 (53.8)	8.8 (47.8)	5.5 (41.9)	2.4 (36.3)	1.9 (35.4)	3.2 (37.8)	6.0 (42.8)	8.9 (48.0)	11.1 (52.0)	13.4 (56.1)	8.6 (47.4)
Mean daily minimum °C (°F)	4.6 (40.3)	3.9 (39.0)	2.5 (36.5)	0.5 (32.9)	−0.7 (30.7)	−1.9 (28.6)	−2.6 (27.3)	−2.1 (28.2)	−0.7 (30.7)	0.8 (33.4)	2.4 (36.3)	3.9 (39.0)	0.9 (33.6)
Average precipitation mm (inches)	43.0 (1.69)	49.9 (1.96)	88.2 (3.47)	120.8 (4.76)	314.0 (12.36)	332.6 (13.09)	307.1 (12.09)	259.9 (10.23)	165.3 (6.51)	86.7 (3.41)	105.7 (4.16)	71.4 (2.81)	1,944.6 (76.54)
Average relative humidity (%)	67	69	73	77	81	86	85	82	76	71	69	69	75
Source: Bioclimatografia de Chile

== See also ==
- Troyo hamlet
- Icalma Lake
- Galletué Lake
- Trans-Andean Railways
