= Vilcún =

- Town and Commune
- Flag Map of Vilcún commune in the Araucanía Region Location in Chile
- Coordinates (town): 38°39′S 72°14′W
- Country: Chile
- Region: Araucanía
- Province: Cautín
- Founded: 18 October 1926

Government
  - Type: Municipality
  - Alcalde: Patricio Villanueva Rubilar (PPD)

Area
  - Total: 1,420.9 km^{2} (548.6 sq mi)
- Elevation: 326 m (1,070 ft)

Population (2012 Census)
  - Total: 22,499
  - Density: 15.834/km^{2} (41.011/sq mi)
  - Urban: 9,024
  - Rural: 13,467

Sex
  - Men: 11,392
  - Women: 11,099
- Time zone: UTC-4 (CLT)
  - Summer (DST): UTC-3 (CLST)
- Area code: country 56 + city 45
- Website: Municipality of Vilcún

Vilcún (Mapudungun for "lizard") is a Chilean town and commune in Cautín Province, Araucanía Region. The town is an important gateway for tourists visiting Conguillío National Park and Llaima volcano.

The commune also includes the localities of Cherquenco, San Patricio, General López and Cajón.

== Demographics ==
Historical population
Year	Pop.	±% p.a.
1885	691	—
1895	1,143	+5.16%
1907	3,809	+10.55%
1920	10,742	+8.30%
1930	13,772	+2.52%
1940	17,344	+2.33%
1952	14,669	−1.39%
1970	20,565	+1.89%
1982	20,245	−0.13%
1992	20,887	+0.31%
2002	22,491	+0.74%
2017	28,151	+1.51%
2024	31,575	+1.65%
Source: "Censo de Población y Vivienda". National Statistics Institute.

According to the 2002 census of the National Statistics Institute, Vilcún spans an area of 1,420.9 km^{2} (549 sq mi) and has 22,491 inhabitants (11,392 men and 11,099 women). Of these, 9,024 (40.1%) lived in urban areas and 13,467 (59.9%) in rural areas. The population grew by 7.7% (1,604 persons) between the 1992 and 2002 censuses.

== Administration ==
As a commune, Vilcún is a third-level administrative division of Chile administered by a municipal council, headed by an alcalde who is directly elected every four years. The 2008-2012 alcalde is Patricio Villanueva Rubilar (PPD).

Within the electoral divisions of Chile, Vilcún is represented in the Chamber of Deputies by Enrique Estay (UDI) and Fuad Chahín (PDC) as part of the 49th electoral district, together with Victoria, Curacautín, Lonquimay, Melipeuco, Lautaro, Perquenco and Galvarino. The commune is represented in the Senate by Alberto Espina Otero (RN) and Jaime Quintana Leal (PPD) as part of the 14th senatorial constituency (Araucanía-North).
