= Renaico =

- City and Commune
- Map of Renaico commune in the Araucania Region Location in Chile
- Coordinates (city): 37°40′S 72°35′W
- Country: Chile
- Region: Araucanía Region
- Province: Malleco

Government
  - Type: Municipality
  - Alcalde: Ivonne Morales Urra (Ind.)

Area
  - Total: 267.4 km^{2} (103.2 sq mi)
- Elevation: 55 m (180 ft)

Population (2012 Census)
  - Total: 9,850
  - Density: 36.8/km^{2} (95.4/sq mi)
  - Urban: 6,878
  - Rural: 2,250

Sex
  - Men: 4,508
  - Women: 4,620
- Time zone: UTC−4 (CLT)
  - Summer (DST): UTC−3 (CLST)
- Area code: country 56 + city 45
- Climate: Csb
- Website: Municipality of Renaico

Renaico (Spanish pronunciation: [reˈnajko]) is a city and commune forming part of the Malleco Province in the Araucanía Region in southern Chile. The city is located on the south bank of the Renaico River.

== Demographics ==
Historical population
Year	Pop.	±% p.a.
1875	1,822	—
1885	2,506	+3.24%
1895	2,891	+1.44%
1907	3,251	+0.98%
1920	3,839	+1.29%
1930	4,809	+2.28%
1940	4,953	+0.30%
1952	5,348	+0.64%
1970	7,467	+1.87%
1982	8,717	+1.30%
1992	9,197	+0.54%
2002	9,128	−0.08%
2017	10,250	+0.78%
2024	10,686	+0.60%
Source: "Censo de Población y Vivienda". National Statistics Institute.

According to the 2002 census of the National Statistics Institute, Renaico spans an area of 267.4 km^{2} (103 sq mi) and has 9,128 inhabitants (4,508 men and 4,620 women). Of these, 6,878 (75.4%) lived in urban areas and 2,250 (24.6%) in rural areas. The population fell by 0.8% (69 persons) between the 1992 and 2002 censuses.

== Administration ==
As a commune, Renaico is a third-level administrative division of Chile administered by a municipal council, headed by an alcalde who is directly elected every four years. The 2008-2012 alcalde is Ivonne Morales Urra (Ind.).

Within the electoral divisions of Chile, Renaico is represented in the Chamber of Deputies by Gonzalo Arenas (UDI) and Mario Venegas (PDC) as part of the 48th electoral district, together with Angol, Collipulli, Ercilla, Los Sauces, Purén, Lumaco and Traiguén. The commune is represented in the Senate by Alberto Espina Otero (RN) and Jaime Quintana Leal (PPD) as part of the 14th senatorial constituency (Araucanía-North).
