= Lumaco =

- Town and Commune
- Map of Lumaco commune in the Araucanía Region Location in Chile
- Coordinates (town): 38°09′S 72°55′W
- Country: Chile
- Region: Araucanía
- Province: Malleco

Government
  - Type: Municipality
  - Alcalde: Manuel Painiqueo Tragnolao (PS)

Area
  - Total: 1,119.0 km^{2} (432.0 sq mi)
- Elevation: 118 m (387 ft)

Population (2012 Census)
  - Total: 11,405
  - Density: 10.192/km^{2} (26.398/sq mi)
  - Urban: 4,132
  - Rural: 7,273

Sex
  - Men: 6,074
  - Women: 5,331
- Time zone: UTC-4 (CLT)
  - Summer (DST): UTC-3 (CLST)
- Area code: country 56 + city 45
- Website: www.munilumaco.cl

Lumaco is a town and commune in Malleco Province in the Araucanía Region of Chile. Its name in Mapudungun means "water of luma". Lumaco is located to 120 km (75 mi) northeast of Temuco and 52 km (32 mi) from Angol. It shares a boundary to the north with the communes of Purén and Los Sauces, to the east with Traiguén and Galvarino, to the south with Cholchol and Carahue in Cautin Province, and the west with Tirúa and Contulmo in the Arauco Province of the Biobío Region.

The area of Lumaco and Purén is rich in Mapuche and early Spanish archaeological sites.

== Geography ==
The epicenter of the 1960 Valdivia earthquake, the strongest earthquake ever recorded, was near Lumaco.

== Demographics ==
Historical population
Year	Pop.	±% p.a.
1875	1,209	—
1885	3,402	+10.90%
1895	5,943	+5.74%
1907	9,610	+4.09%
1920	11,075	+1.10%
1930	14,038	+2.40%
1940	16,643	+1.72%
1952	17,081	+0.22%
1970	13,446	−1.32%
1982	11,883	−1.02%
1992	12,258	+0.31%
2002	11,405	−0.72%
2017	9,548	−1.18%
2024	9,253	−0.45%
Source: "Censo de Población y Vivienda". National Statistics Institute.

According to the 2002 census of the National Statistics Institute, Lumaco spans an area of 1,119 km^{2} (432 sq mi) and has 11,405 inhabitants (6,074 men and 5,331 women). Of these, 4,132 (36.2%) lived in urban areas and 7,273 (63.8%) in rural areas. The population fell by 7% (853 persons) between the 1992 and 2002 censuses.

== Administration ==
As a commune, Lumaco is a third-level administrative division of Chile administered by a municipal council, headed by an alcalde who is directly elected every four years. The 2008-2012 alcalde is Manuel Painiqueo Tragnolao (PS).

Within the electoral divisions of Chile, Lumaco is represented in the Chamber of Deputies by Gonzalo Arenas (UDI) and Mario Venegas (PDC) as part of the 48th electoral district, together with Angol, Renaico, Collipulli, Ercilla, Los Sauces, Purén and Traiguén. The commune is represented in the Senate by Alberto Espina Otero (RN) and Jaime Quintana Leal (PPD) as part of the 14th senatorial constituency (Araucanía-North).
