= Los Sauces =

- Town and Commune
- Location in the Araucanía Region Location in Chile
- Coordinates: 37°58′S 72°50′W
- Country: Chile
- Region: Araucanía
- Province: Malleco

Government
  - Type: Municipality
  - Alcalde: Gastón Mella Arzola. (PDC)

Area
  - Total: 849.8 km^{2} (328.1 sq mi)
- Elevation: 153 m (502 ft)

Population (2012 Census)
  - Total: 7,169
  - Density: 8.436/km^{2} (21.85/sq mi)
  - Urban: 3,638
  - Rural: 3,943
- Demonym: Saucino

Sex
  - Men: 3,847
  - Women: 3,734
- Time zone: UTC-4 (CLT)
  - Summer (DST): UTC-3 (CLST)
- Area code: 56 + 45
- Website: Municipality of Los Sauces

Los Sauces (Spanish pronunciation: [los ˈsawses]) is a Chilean town and commune in the Malleco Province, Araucanía Region.

== Demographics ==
Historical population
Year	Pop.	±% p.a.
1875	1,396	—
1885	5,273	+14.21%
1895	5,887	+1.11%
1907	6,918	+1.35%
1920	8,932	+1.98%
1930	8,750	−0.21%
1940	10,052	+1.40%
1952	8,626	−1.27%
1970	8,787	+0.10%
1982	9,341	+0.51%
1992	8,995	−0.38%
2002	7,581	−1.70%
2017	7,265	−0.28%
2024	7,348	+0.16%
Source: "Censo de Población y Vivienda". National Statistics Institute.

According to the 2002 census of the National Statistics Institute, Los Sauces spans an area of 849.8 km^{2} (328 sq mi) and has 7,581 inhabitants (3,847 men and 3,734 women). Of these, 3,638 (48%) lived in urban areas and 3,943 (52%) in rural areas. Between the 1992 and 2002 censuses, the population fell by 15.7% (1,414 persons).

== Administration ==
As a commune, Los Sauces is a third-level administrative division of Chile administered by a municipal council, headed by an alcalde who is directly elected every four years. The 2008-2012 alcalde is Ramón Vilches Álvarez (PDC), and the council has the following members:

- Jaime Badilla E. (Ind./RN)
- Nelda Gallegos (RN)
- Pedro Carrillo F. (UDI)
- Eva Calderón M. (PDC)
- Victor Gonzalez (UDI)
- Jose Ortega E. (PDC)

Within the electoral divisions of Chile, Los Sauces is represented in the Chamber of Deputies by Gonzalo Arenas (UDI) and Mario Venegas (PDC) as part of the 48th electoral district, together with Angol, Renaico, Collipulli, Ercilla, Purén, Lumaco and Traiguén. The commune is represented in the Senate by Alberto Espina Otero (RN) and Jaime Quintana Leal (PPD) as part of the 14th senatorial constituency (Araucanía-North).
