= Purén =

- City and Commune
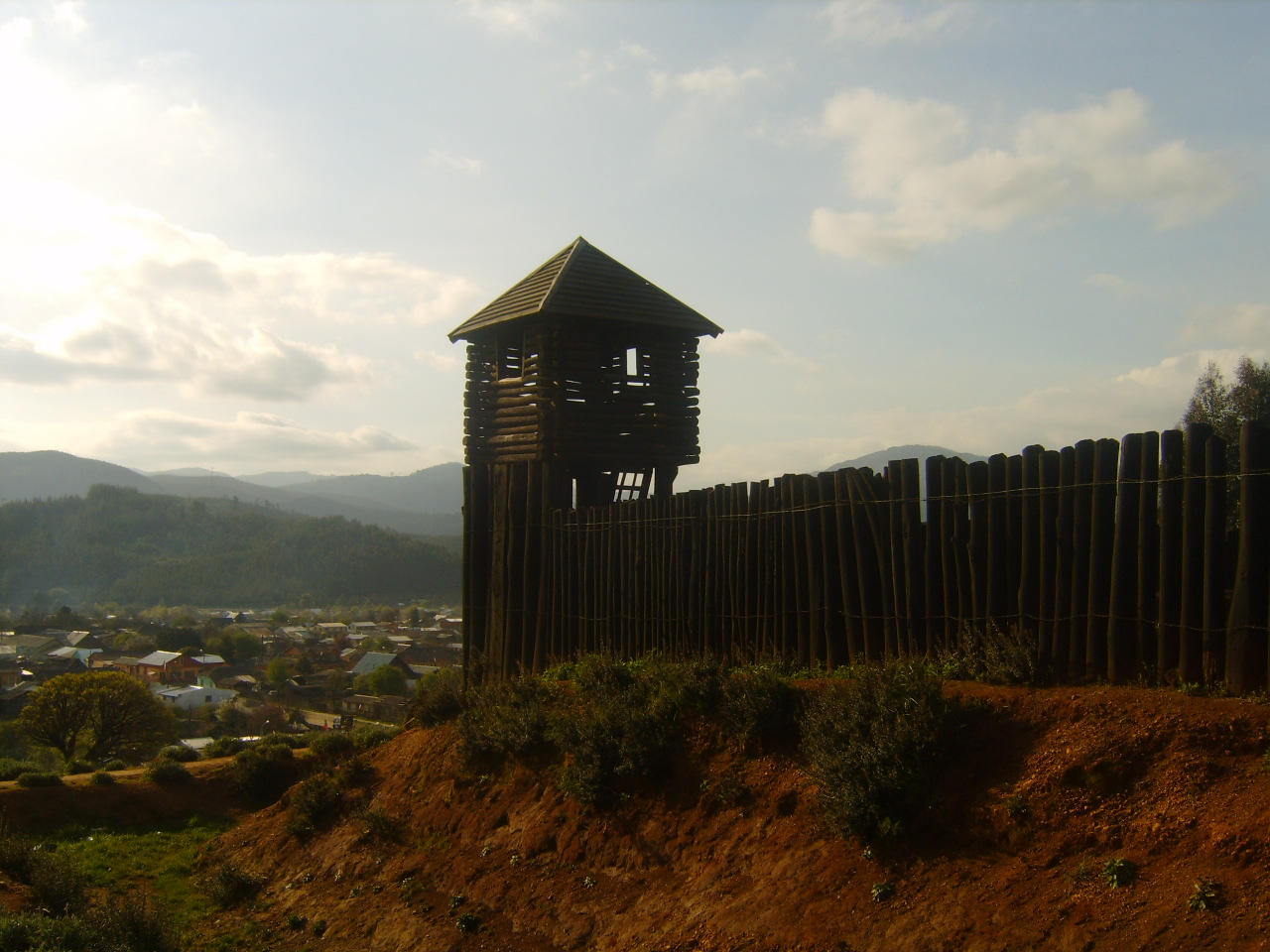
- Fort of Purén with the town in background

- Coat of arms Map of Purén commune in the Araucania Region Location in Chile
- Coordinates (city): 38°01′55″S 73°04′22″W
- Country: Chile
- Region: La Araucanía
- Province: Malleco

Government
  - Type: Municipality
  - Alcalde: Benigno Quiñones Lara (PDC)

Area
  - Total: 464.9 km^{2} (179.5 sq mi)
- Elevation: 88 m (289 ft)

Population (2012 Census)
  - Total: 11,815
  - Density: 25.41/km^{2} (65.82/sq mi)
  - Urban: 7,604
  - Rural: 5,264

Sex
  - Men: 6,408
  - Women: 6,460
- Time zone: UTC−4 (CLT)
  - Summer (DST): UTC−3 (CLST)
- Area code: country 56 + city 45
- Website: Official website

Purén is a city (2002 pop. 12,868) and commune in Malleco Province of La Araucanía Region, Chile. It is located in the west base of the Cordillera de Nahuelbuta (650 km. south of Santiago). The economical activity of Purén is based in forest exploitation and agriculture. The most characteristic product of Purén is the white strawberry which is one of two species of strawberry that were hybridized to create the modern garden strawberry.

In the Mapuche language or Mapudungun, Purén means swampy place.

== History ==
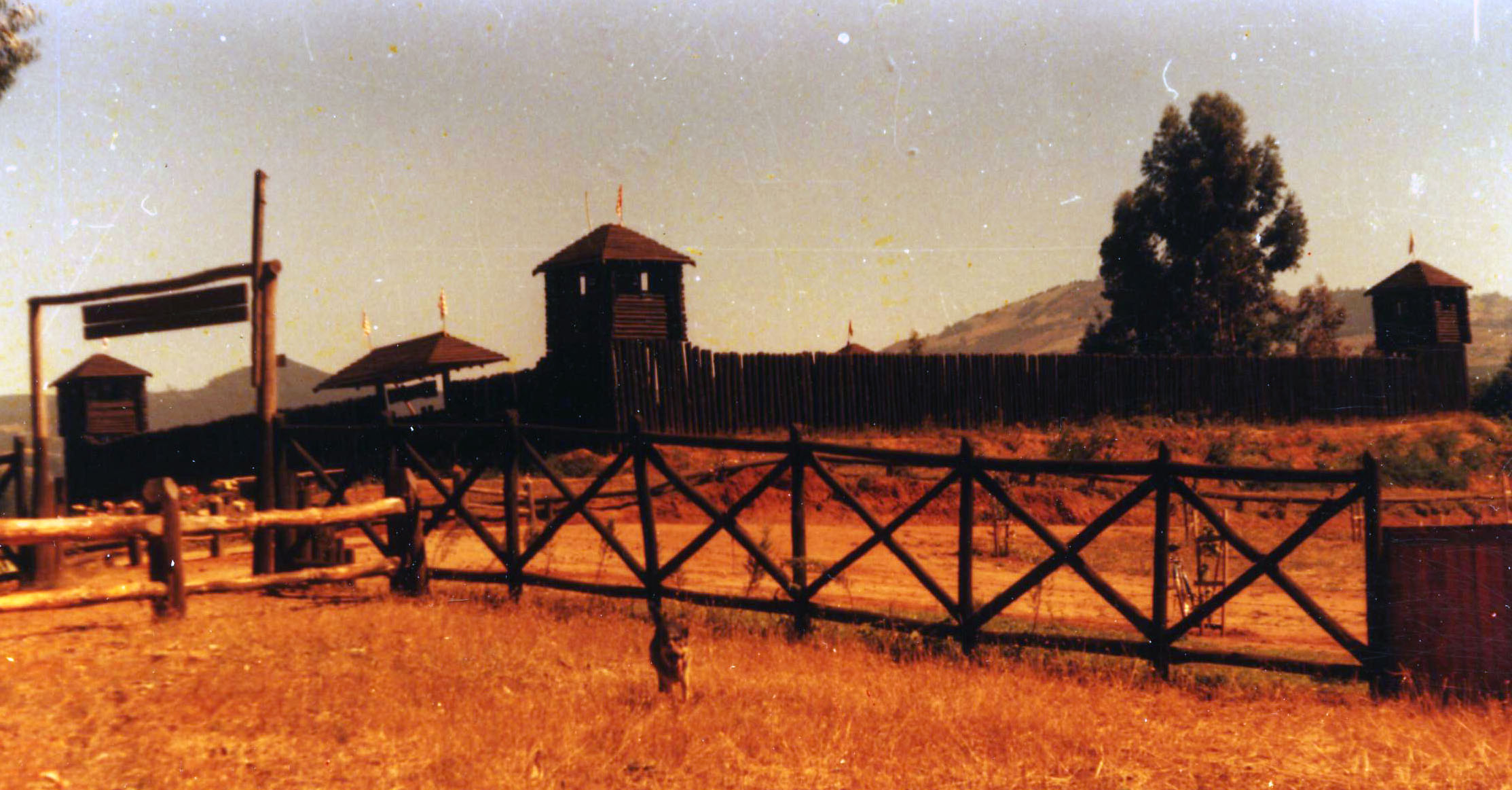
Fuerte de la Pacificación

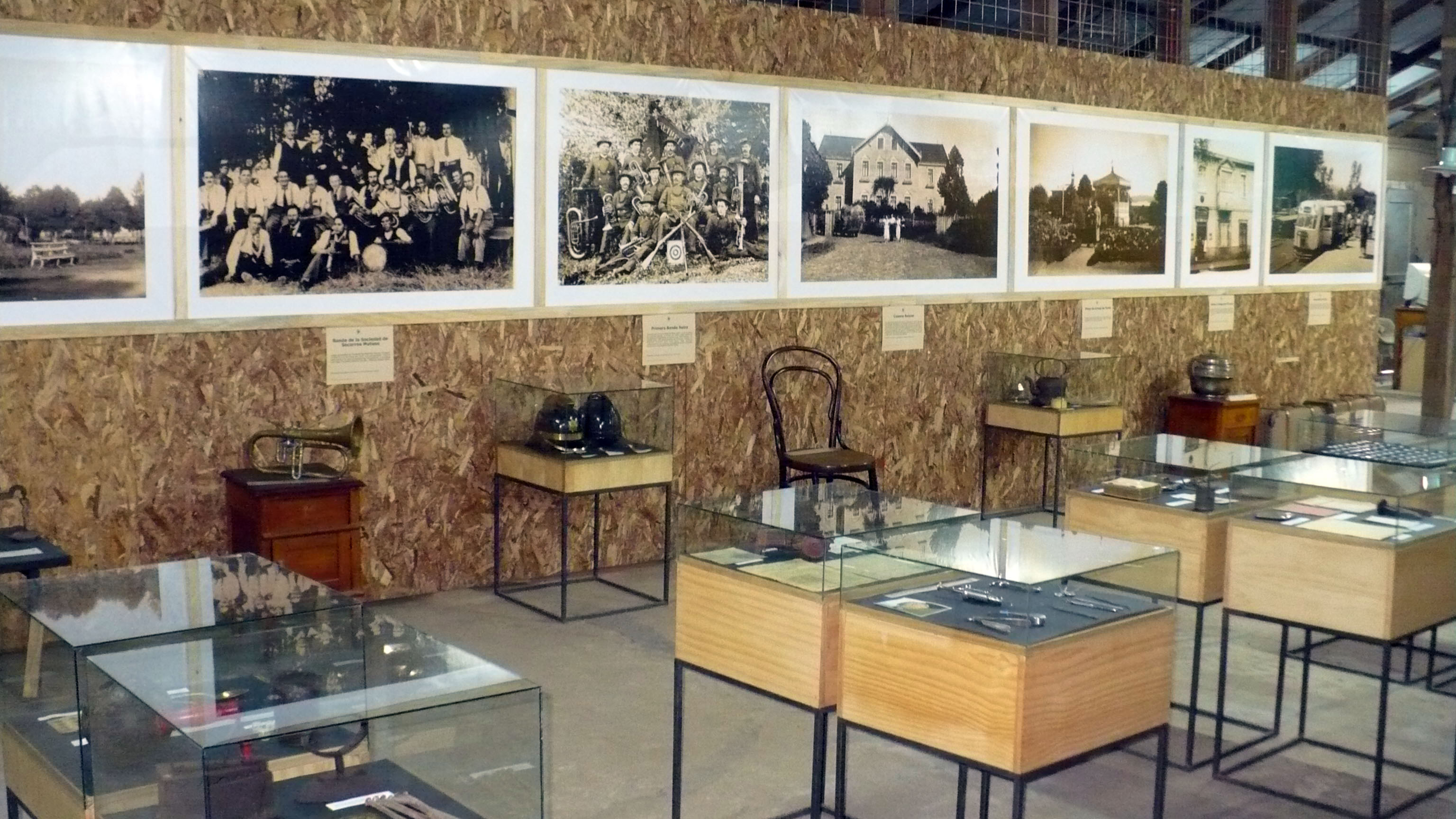
Museo Historico de Purén

San Juan Bautista de Purén was a fort founded by Juan Gomez de Almagro, by order of the Governor of Chile Pedro de Valdivia, almost in the center of the northwest part of the valley of Purén, a little more than a kilometer from the left bank of the Purén River in the Purén valley and about six kilometers to the northeast of the present city of Purén.

This fort was abandoned on the death of Pedro de Valdivia but was reoccupied by García Hurtado de Mendoza, after a bitter campaign with the followers of Caupolicán on May 20, 1558. Guanoalca captured and burned it in 1586. Rebuilt by Governor Alonso de Sotomayor in 1589, it received some improvements but it was always harassed by the Mapuche, and was again abandoned and set afire by them in the 1598 Mapuche rising that exploded after the Disaster of Curalaba.

The fort was again restored under the governor Alonso Garcia Ramon in 1609, lost again and rebuilt by governor Alonso de Ribera in 1613 and was again abandoned in 1624. So it remained until 1665, when governor Francisco de Meneses Brito again built a fort there and repopulated it. Finally in 1723, Governor Gabriel Cano de Aponte decided to order its demolition and permanent abandonment, moving the garrison to the fort of San Carlos de Purén called Purén Nuevo (New Purén), on the Bio Bio River. The old ruins continued to be known as Old Purén and those ruins were still to be seen in the 1890s.

On November 24, 1868, a new fort was built in Puren, located at 38° 04' Lat. and 73° 06' Lon., between the brooks Nahuelco and Panqueco, a little more than three kilometers from the south or right bank of the upper part of the Purén River. To the northeast on the opposite shore of the Purén river is the location that the old Purén fortress occupied. A village had sprung up next to the fort by the 1890s following the occupation of Araucania.

Recently, some pre-Hispanic proto-pyramids or mounds have been discovered near Purén.

== Demographics ==
Historical population
Year	Pop.	±% p.a.
1875	1,906	—
1885	2,545	+2.93%
1895	4,968	+6.92%
1907	8,264	+4.33%
1920	9,327	+0.94%
1930	11,434	+2.06%
1940	12,078	+0.55%
1952	12,515	+0.30%
1970	10,254	−1.10%
1982	12,634	+1.75%
1992	13,917	+0.97%
2002	12,868	−0.78%
2017	11,779	−0.59%
2024	12,184	+0.48%
Source: "Censo de Población y Vivienda". National Statistics Institute.

According to the 2002 census of the National Statistics Institute, Purén spans an area of 464.9 km^{2} (179 sq mi) and has 12,868 inhabitants (6,408 men and 6,460 women). Of these, 7,604 (59.1%) lived in urban areas and 5,264 (40.9%) in rural areas. Between the 1992 and 2002 censuses, the population fell by 7.5% (1,049 persons).

== Administration ==
As a commune, Purén is a third-level administrative division of Chile administered by a municipal council, headed by an alcalde who is directly elected every four years. The 2008-2012 alcalde is Benigno Quiñones Lara (PDC).

Within the electoral divisions of Chile, Purén is represented in the Chamber of Deputies by Gonzalo Arenas (UDI) and Mario Venegas (PDC) as part of the 48th electoral district, together with Angol, Renaico, Collipulli, Ercilla, Los Sauces, Lumaco and Traiguén. The commune is represented in the Senate by Alberto Espina Otero (RN) and Jaime Quintana Leal (PPD) as part of the 14th senatorial constituency (Araucanía-North).

== Sources ==
- Francisco Solano Asta-Buruaga y Cienfuegos, Diccionario geográfico de la República de Chile, D. Appleton y Compania, New York, 1899
  - Purén,(Aldea y fuerte) pg. 597
  - Purén,(Antigua plaza fuerte) pg. 598
