= Curacautín =

Curacautín Fuerte Curacautín
- City and Commune
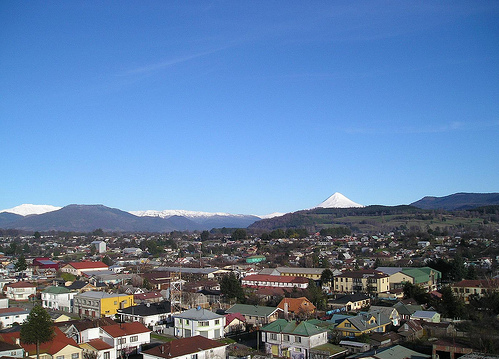
- View of Curacautín

- Coat of arms Map of the Curacautín commune in the Araucanía Region Location in Chile
- Coordinates (city): 38°26′S 71°53′W
- Country: Chile
- Region: Araucanía Region
- Province: Malleco Province
- Established: March 12, 1882

Government
  - Type: Municipality
  - Alcalde: Jorge Saquel Albarran (Ind.)

Area
  - Total: 1,664.0 km^{2} (642.5 sq mi)
- Elevation: 542 m (1,778 ft)

Population (2012 Census)
  - Total: 16,508
  - Density: 9.9207/km^{2} (25.694/sq mi)
  - Urban: 12,412
  - Rural: 4,558
- Demonym: Curacautinense(s)

Sex
  - Men: 8310
  - Women: 8660
- Time zone: UTC−4 (CLT)
  - Summer (DST): UTC−3 (CLST)
- Postal Code: 4700000
- Area code: 56 + 45
- Website: Municipality of Curacautín

Curacautín, which means "Gathering Stone" in Mapudungun, is a commune and city in the Chilean province of Malleco. Curacautín is located 90 kilometres northeast of Temuco, in a valley near the volcanoes Tolhuaca, Lonquimay and Llaima, all of which can be seen from the city. Historically, it served as a highway of sorts for the Pehuenches that lived on either side of the Andes mountain range.

== Volcanic origin ==
This area is known for its natural environment, and the Conguillío and Tolhuaca National Parks, and Malleco and Malalcahuello-Nalcas National Reserves are close by.

== History ==
The fort at Curacautín was founded on March 12, 1882, by Gregorio Urrutia.

Between 1913 and 1915, two important structures (the railroad and the Greater City Hall) were built. In 1938, Mosso plywood factory began production, being the first in Chile to export plywood. This, coupled with the railroad, allowed products to be shipped all over Chile as well as internationally. This factory was one of the main employers of the commune, having a big impact in every aspect of the city. In 2000, FOCURA (formerly Mosso) its declares in bankruptcy, ending an era in Curacautín.

Wood from the forests of the Curacautín Valley was the first product jointly labelled as meeting Forest Stewardship Council (FSC) and Fairtrade International (FLO) standards, manufactured commercially by Swedish firm Kährs from 2011.

== Demographics ==
Historical population
Year	Pop.	±% p.a.
1895	4,183	—
1907	5,704	+2.62%
1920	9,606	+4.09%
1930	10,313	+0.71%
1940	14,715	+3.62%
1952	17,827	+1.61%
1960	18,536	+0.49%
1970	17,170	−0.76%
1982	18,475	+0.61%
1992	18,135	−0.19%
2002	16,970	−0.66%
2017	17,413	+0.17%
2024	18,536	+0.90%
Source: "Censo de Población y Vivienda". National Statistics Institute.

According to the 2002 census of the National Statistics Institute, Curacautín spans an area of 1,664.0 km^{2} (642 sq mi) and has 16,970 inhabitants (8,310 men and 8,660 women). Of these, 12,412 (73.1%) lived in urban areas and 4,558 (26.9%) in rural areas. Between the 1992 and 2002 censuses, the population fell by 6.4% (1,165 persons).

== Administration ==
As a commune, Curacautín is a third-level administrative division of Chile administered by a municipal council, headed by an alcalde who is directly elected every four years. The 2008-2012 alcalde is Jorge Saquel Albarran (Ind.).

Currently the mayor of the commune is Hugo Vidal Merino (2024-2028)

Within the electoral divisions of Chile, Curacautín is represented in the Chamber of Deputies by Enrique Estay (UDI) and Fuad Chahín (PDC) as part of the 49th electoral district, together with Victoria, Lonquimay, Melipeuco, Vilcún, Lautaro, Perquenco and Galvarino. The commune is represented in the Senate by Alberto Espina Otero (RN) and Jaime Quintana Leal (PPD) as part of the 14th senatorial constituency (Araucanía-North).

There is a small private airport, Curacautín Airport, located two miles away from the city.
