= Traiguén =

- City and Commune
- Location in the Araucanía Region Location in Chile
- Coordinates: 38°15′S 72°41′W
- Country: Chile
- Region: Araucanía
- Province: Malleco

Government
  - Type: Municipality
  - Alcalde: Ricardo Sanhueza Pirce (Ind.)

Area
  - Total: 908.0 km^{2} (350.6 sq mi)
- Elevation: 188 m (617 ft)

Population (2012 Census)
  - Total: 17,164
  - Density: 18.90/km^{2} (48.96/sq mi)
  - Urban: 14,140
  - Rural: 5,394

Sex
  - Men: 9,734
  - Women: 9,800
- Time zone: UTC−4 (CLT)
  - Summer (DST): UTC−3 (CLST)
- Area code: country 56 + city 45
- Website: Municipality of Traiguén

Traiguén (Spanish pronunciation: [tɾajˈɣen]) is a Chilean city and commune in the Malleco Province, Araucanía Region.

== Demographics ==
Historical population
| Year | Pop. | ±% p.a. |
|---|---|---|
| 1885 | 10,324 | — |
| 1895 | 15,357 | +4.05% |
| 1907 | 15,328 | −0.02% |
| 1920 | 17,000 | +0.80% |
| 1930 | 17,832 | +0.48% |
| 1940 | 19,638 | +0.97% |
| 1952 | 19,341 | −0.13% |
| 1960 | 19,498 | +0.10% |
| 1970 | 19,381 | −0.06% |
| 1982 | 20,448 | +0.45% |
| 1992 | 20,622 | +0.08% |
| 2002 | 19,534 | −0.54% |
| 2017 | 18,843 | −0.24% |
| 2024 | 18,873 | +0.02% |
Source: "Censo de Población y Vivienda". National Statistics Institute.

According to the 2002 census of the National Statistics Institute, Traiguén spans an area of 908 km^{2} (351 sq mi) and has 19,534 inhabitants (9,734 men and 9,800 women). Of these, 14,140 (72.4%) lived in urban areas and 5,394 (27.6%) in rural areas. Between the 1992 and 2002 censuses, the population fell by 5.3% (1,088 persons).

== Administration ==
As a commune, Traiguén is a third-level administrative division of Chile administered by a municipal council, headed by an alcalde who is directly elected every four years. The 2012-2016 alcalde is Luis Alvarez (Ind.).And The municipal council 2012-2016 has the following members:

- Ricardo Sanhueza Pirce PPD
- Essio Guidotti Vallejos PPD
- Eliecer Cerda Soto IND
- Pablo Mena Osses PRS
- Roberto Weidmann Ramirez UDI
- Rosanna Rathgeb Fuentes RN

Within the electoral divisions of Chile, Traiguén is represented in the Chamber of Deputies by Gonzalo Arenas (UDI) and Mario Venegas (PDC) as part of the 48th electoral district, together with Angol, Renaico, Collipulli, Ercilla, Los Sauces, Purén and Lumaco. The commune is represented in the Senate by Alberto Espina Otero (RN) and Jaime Quintana Leal (PPD) as part of the 14th senatorial constituency (Araucanía-North).

== Climate ==
Climate data for Traiguén
| Month | Jan | Feb | Mar | Apr | May | Jun | Jul | Aug | Sep | Oct | Nov | Dec | Year |
|---|---|---|---|---|---|---|---|---|---|---|---|---|---|
| Mean daily maximum °C (°F) | 26.8 (80.2) | 26.5 (79.7) | 23.1 (73.6) | 18.4 (65.1) | 14.3 (57.7) | 11.7 (53.1) | 11.6 (52.9) | 12.9 (55.2) | 15.3 (59.5) | 18.6 (65.5) | 21.3 (70.3) | 24.2 (75.6) | 18.7 (65.7) |
| Daily mean °C (°F) | 17.5 (63.5) | 17.2 (63.0) | 15.1 (59.2) | 11.9 (53.4) | 9.3 (48.7) | 7.6 (45.7) | 7.3 (45.1) | 7.8 (46.0) | 9.4 (48.9) | 11.6 (52.9) | 13.6 (56.5) | 15.9 (60.6) | 12.0 (53.6) |
| Mean daily minimum °C (°F) | 10.4 (50.7) | 10.1 (50.2) | 8.7 (47.7) | 7.0 (44.6) | 5.5 (41.9) | 4.7 (40.5) | 4.1 (39.4) | 3.8 (38.8) | 4.8 (40.6) | 6.0 (42.8) | 7.6 (45.7) | 9.0 (48.2) | 6.8 (44.3) |
| Average precipitation mm (inches) | 34.4 (1.35) | 26.2 (1.03) | 53.3 (2.10) | 91.8 (3.61) | 211.1 (8.31) | 214.3 (8.44) | 192.0 (7.56) | 159.2 (6.27) | 103.4 (4.07) | 59.8 (2.35) | 55.7 (2.19) | 40.0 (1.57) | 1,241.2 (48.85) |
| Average relative humidity (%) | 64 | 67 | 72 | 80 | 86 | 88 | 88 | 85 | 82 | 77 | 73 | 68 | 78 |
Source: Bioclimatografia de Chile

== Education ==
Previously the area had a German school, the Deutsche Schule Traiguén.
