= Collipulli =

- City and Commune
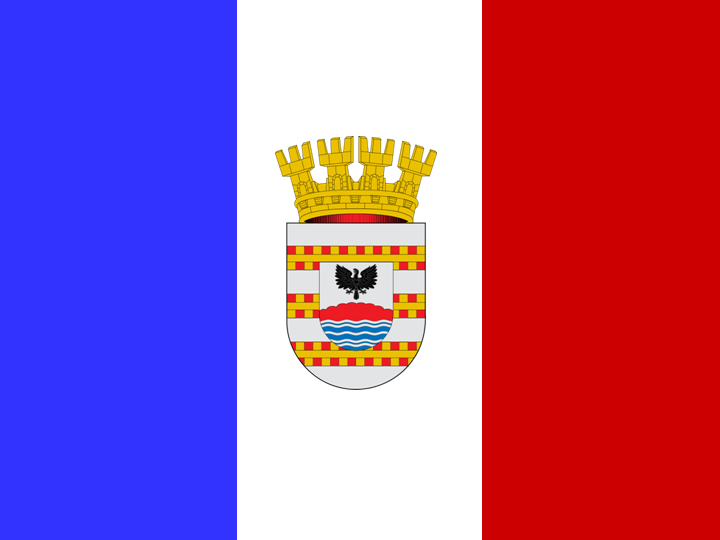
- Flag Coat of arms Location of Collipulli within the Araucanía Region Location in Chile
- Coordinates (city): 37°57′S 72°26′W
- Country: Chile
- Region: Araucanía
- Province: Malleco
- Established: 22 August 1884

Government
  - Type: Municipality
  - Alcalde: Manuel Macaya Ramírez (Independent)

Area
  - Total: 1,295.9 km^{2} (500.3 sq mi)
- Elevation: 243 m (797 ft)

Population (2012 Census)
  - Total: 23,321
  - Density: 17.996/km^{2} (46.609/sq mi)
  - Urban: 16,006
  - Rural: 6,348
- Demonym: Collipullense

Sex
  - Men: 11,106
  - Women: 11,248
- Time zone: UTC−4 (CLT)
  - Summer (DST): UTC−3 (CLST)
- Area code: country 56 + city 45
- Website: Municipality of Collipulli

Collipulli is a city and commune forming part of the Malleco Province in the Araucanía Region in southern Chile. Its name means "coloured lands" in the Mapuche language spoken in the area. It has a population of 22,354 (2005) and an area of 1,296 km^{2} (500 sq mi). Its current mayor is Manuel Macaya Ramírez.

== History ==
On 22 November 1867, the city was founded as a military fort during the Occupation of Araucanía. No traces of the fort remain today. The fort was protected by defensive ditches and wooden stakes, and was supported by a series of bridges placed over the Malleco River and its tributaries. Other forts were established in the area, and settlers soon followed, developing the land for agriculture.

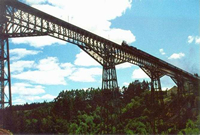
The Malleco Viaduct, a National Monument located in Collipulli.

The Malleco Viaduct, today a National Monument, was officially opened on 26 October 1890, by President Manuel Balmaceda. The viaduct served as a rapid and effective transportation system for trade and commerce. It sustained some damage in the major earthquake of 27 February 2010.

=== Present day ===
Collipulli's economy relies on farming, forestry, and services. Although the majority of the land is suitable for agriculture, an increasing area has been given to forestry in recent years. Mario Garbarini helped to found the firefighters company and was well known in Collipulli.

== Demographics ==
Historical population
| Year | Pop. | ±% p.a. |
|---|---|---|
| 1875 | 5,839 | — |
| 1885 | 15,989 | +10.60% |
| 1895 | 12,284 | −2.60% |
| 1907 | 11,714 | −0.40% |
| 1920 | 12,484 | +0.49% |
| 1930 | 13,544 | +0.82% |
| 1940 | 13,847 | +0.22% |
| 1952 | 12,954 | −0.55% |
| 1970 | 16,446 | +1.33% |
| 1982 | 19,422 | +1.40% |
| 1992 | 22,767 | +1.60% |
| 2002 | 22,354 | −0.18% |
| 2017 | 24,598 | +0.64% |
| 2024 | 24,303 | −0.17% |
Source: "Censo de Población y Vivienda". National Statistics Institute.

According to the 2002 census of the National Statistics Institute, Collipulli spans an area of 1,295.9 km^{2} (500 sq mi) and has 22,354 inhabitants (11,106 men and 11,248 women). Of these, 16,006 (71.6%) lived in urban areas and 6,348 (28.4%) in rural areas. The population fell by 1.8% (413 persons) between the 1992 and 2002 censuses.

== Administration ==
As a commune, Collipulli is a third-level administrative division of Chile administered by a municipal council, headed by an alcalde who is directly elected every four years. The 2008-2012 alcalde is Leopoldo Rosales Neira (PS).

Within the electoral divisions of Chile, Collipulli is represented in the Chamber of Deputies by Gonzalo Arenas (UDI) and Mario Venegas (PDC) as part of the 48th electoral district, together with Angol, Renaico, Ercilla, Los Sauces, Purén, Lumaco and Traiguén. The commune is represented in the Senate by Alberto Espina Otero (RN) and Jaime Quintana Leal (PPD) as part of the 14th senatorial constituency (Araucanía-North).
