= Angol =

Angol Angol de los Confines
- City and Commune
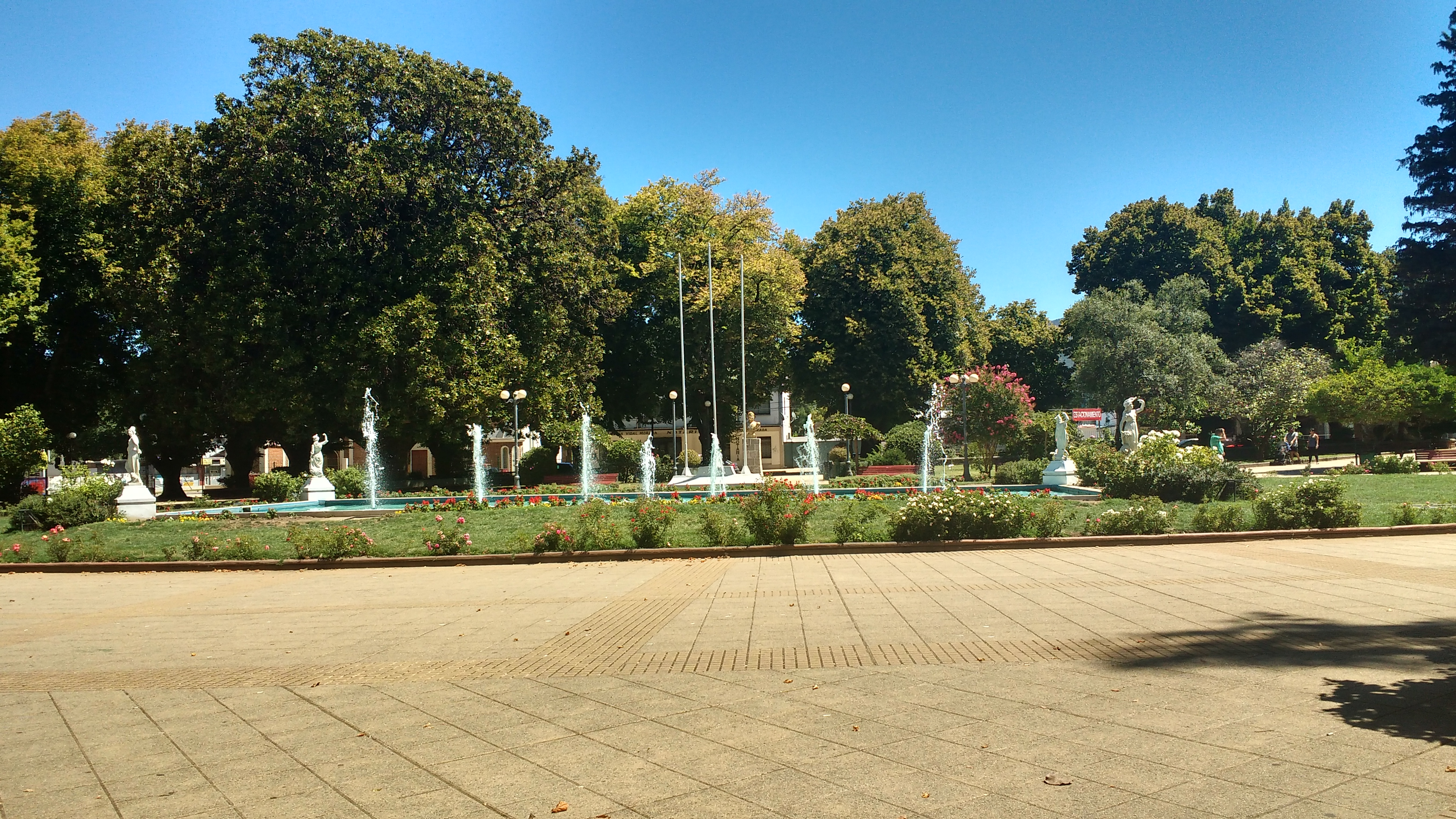
- Plaza de Armas de Angol

- Coat of arms Location of the commune of Angol in Araucanía Region Location in Chile
- Coordinates: 37°48′S 72°43′W
- Country: Chile
- Region: Araucanía
- Province: Malleco
- Founded: 6 December 1862

Government
  - Type: Municipality
  - Alcalde: Enrique Neira Neira (Chile Vamos)

Area
  - Total: 1,194.4 km^{2} (461.2 sq mi)
- Elevation: 65 m (213 ft)

Population (2017 Census)
  - Total: 53,262
  - Density: 44.593/km^{2} (115.50/sq mi)
  - Urban: 43,801
  - Rural: 5,195

Sex
  - Men: 23,770
  - Women: 25,226
- Time zone: UTC−4 (CLT)
  - Summer (DST): UTC−3 (CLST)
- Postal code: 4650000
- Area code: country 56 city 45
- Climate: Csb
- Website: www.angol.cl (in Spanish)

Angol is a commune and capital city of the Malleco Province in the Araucanía Region of southern Chile. It is located at the foot of the Cordillera de Nahuelbuta and next to the Vergara River, that permitted communications by small boats to the Bío-Bío River and Concepción. This strategic position explains the successive foundations of this city during the Arauco War. It was first founded in 1553 as a "conquistador" fort of Confines, the fort was later destroyed and rebuilt several times and it was not until the Pacification of Araucania in the late 19th century that it was rebuilt with the name of Angol. The city has a current population of approximately 53,000. Within the electoral divisions of Chile, it belongs to the 48th electoral district and the 14th senatorial circumscription.

== History ==
Modern Angol was first founded in 1553 as the conquistador fort of Los Confines by Pedro de Valdivia, the fort was later that year abandoned and destroyed by the Mapuche after the Battle of Tucapel. In 1560, the city was established by Governor García Hurtado de Mendoza with the name of San Andrés de Angol, after his father the viceroy of Peru, the location to the north of the site of the old fort. It was commonly called Ciudad de Los Infantes for the infantrymen that had been assigned to build the city.

It was attacked and destroyed in 1599, by the Mapuches following the Disaster of Curalaba. In 1611 the city was rebuilt by Luis Merlo de la Fuente a little more to the south with the name of San Luis de Angol but it did not prosper. In 1637 Governor Francisco Laso de la Vega, refounded it with the name of San Francisco de la Vega, but in 1641, it was abandoned by the terms of the Peace of Quillin with the Mapuche. It was repopulated by Tomás Marín de Poveda in 1695, with the name of Santo Tomás de Colhue, but it was attacked and destroyed again in the Mapuche Rising of 1723 and one last time in their rising in 1766, from which it never recovered.

The present city of Angol was founded definitively by Cornelio Saavedra Rodríguez, on 6 December 1862 as a fortress and base for his campaign for the Pacification of Araucania. Declared a city in 1871, it was connected by railroad with Santiago in 1876. In 1881 it was the base for the final campaign of pacification. Subsequently, it was the economic and administrative center and departure point for the Chilean and foreign colonists that occupied the lands around it.

Angol was affected by the 8.8 magnitude 27 February 2010 earthquake. A US military field hospital was deployed to the city to treat casualties from the temblor and subsequent tsunami.

== Demographics ==
Historical population
Year	Pop.	±% p.a.
1875	7,969	—
1885	10,960	+3.24%
1895	12,647	+1.44%
1907	14,219	+0.98%
1920	16,790	+1.29%
1930	21,034	+2.28%
1940	25,452	+1.92%
1952	27,551	+0.66%
1970	35,048	+1.35%
1982	39,599	+1.02%
1992	46,226	+1.56%
2002	48,996	+0.58%
2017	53,262	+0.56%
2024	53,022	−0.06%
Source: "Censo de Población y Vivienda". National Statistics Institute.

According to the 2002 census by the National Statistics Institute (INE), Angol spans 1,194.4 km^{2} (461 sq mi) and at that time had 48,996 inhabitants; of these, 43,801 (89.4%) lived in urban areas and 5,195 (10.6%) in rural areas. At that time, there were 23,770 men and 25,226 women. The population grew by 6.0% (2,770 persons) between the 1992 and 2002 censuses.

== Administration ==
As a commune, Angol is a third-level administrative division of Chile administered by a municipal council, headed by an alcalde who is directly elected every four years. The 2008-2012 alcalde is Enrique Neira Neira (ILE).

Within the electoral divisions of Chile, Angol is represented in the Chamber of Deputies by Nicolas Ardiles (UDI) and Mario Venegas (PDC) as part of the 48th electoral district, together with Renaico, Collipulli, Ercilla, Los Sauces, Purén, Lumaco and Traiguén. The commune is represented in the Senate by Alberto Espina Otero (RN) and Jaime Quintana Leal (PPD) as part of the 14th senatorial constituency (Araucanía-North).

== Climate ==
Climate data for Angol
Month	Jan	Feb	Mar	Apr	May	Jun	Jul	Aug	Sep	Oct	Nov	Dec	Year
Mean daily maximum °C (°F)	27.0 (80.6)	27.2 (81.0)	24.3 (75.7)	20.1 (68.2)	15.3 (59.5)	12.6 (54.7)	12.3 (54.1)	13.8 (56.8)	16.4 (61.5)	20.7 (69.3)	22.3 (72.1)	25.5 (77.9)	19.8 (67.6)
Daily mean °C (°F)	19.0 (66.2)	18.4 (65.1)	16.0 (60.8)	12.9 (55.2)	9.9 (49.8)	8.0 (46.4)	7.9 (46.2)	8.3 (46.9)	10.1 (50.2)	12.6 (54.7)	14.6 (58.3)	17.1 (62.8)	12.9 (55.2)
Mean daily minimum °C (°F)	11.5 (52.7)	11.3 (52.3)	9.4 (48.9)	7.3 (45.1)	5.6 (42.1)	4.6 (40.3)	4.1 (39.4)	4.2 (39.6)	5.2 (41.4)	6.8 (44.2)	8.2 (46.8)	10.01 (50.02)	7.35 (45.23)
Average precipitation mm (inches)	17.7 (0.70)	14.0 (0.55)	30.3 (1.19)	49.0 (1.93)	166.7 (6.56)	214.2 (8.43)	170.6 (6.72)	126.0 (4.96)	71.1 (2.80)	42.2 (1.66)	29.1 (1.15)	22.3 (0.88)	953.2 (37.53)
Average relative humidity (%)	52	54	61	71	80	84	82	79	73	70	63	56	69
Source: Bioclimatografia de Chile

== Sources ==
- Francisco Solano Asta-Buruaga y Cienfuegos, Diccionario geográfico de la República de Chile (Geographic dictionary of the Republic of Chile), New York, D. Appleton, 1899. pg. 36-37 "Angol (Ciudad de)" and "Angol Antigua, ó Los Confines (Ciudad de)"
