= Malleco Province =

Malleco Province Provincia de Malleco
- Province
- Field in the Sierra Nevada volcano near Malalcahuello, overlooking the Lonquimay volcano

- Seal

- Location in the La Araucanía Region

- Location in Chile
- Coordinates: 38°15′S 72°15′W
- Country: Chile
- Region: La Araucanía
- Capital: Angol
- Communes: List of 11: Angol; Renaico; Collipulli; Lonquimay; Curacautín; Ercilla; Victoria; Traiguén; Lumaco; Purén; Los Sauces

Government
  - Type: Provincial
  - Governor: Víctor Manoli Nazal (RN)

Area
  - Total: 13,433.3 km^{2} (5,186.6 sq mi)

Population (2017 Census)
  - Total: 205,124
  - Density: 15.2698/km^{2} (39.5486/sq mi)
  - Urban: 151,057
  - Rural: 54,067

Sex
  - Men: 99,811
  - Women: 105,313
- Time zone: UTC-4 (CLT)
  - Summer (DST): UTC-3 (CLST)
- Area code: 56 + 45
- Website: Government of Malleco

Malleco Province (Spanish: Provincia de Malleco) is one of two provinces in the southern Chilean region of La Araucanía (IX). Its population as of the 2017 census is 205,124, and it covers an area of 13,433.3 km^{2} (5,187 sq mi). The provincial capital is the city of Angol.

Malleco Province is known for having the emblematic Malleco Viaduct and the Las Raíces Tunnel, Chile's longest tunnel, which links the eastern part to the rest of the province.

== Communes ==
As one of Chile's second level administrative divisions, Malleco comprises eleven communes, each administered by its respective municipality.

- Angol
- Renaico
- Collipulli
- Lonquimay
- Curacautín
- Ercilla
- Victoria
- Traiguén
- Lumaco
- Purén
- Los Sauces

== Geography and demography ==
Historical population
Year	Pop.	±% p.a.
1940	154,174	—
1952	159,419	+0.28%
1960	174,300	+1.12%
1970	173,308	−0.06%
1982	190,606	+0.80%
1992	203,037	+0.63%
2002	201,615	−0.07%
2017	205,124	+0.12%
2024	206,646	+0.11%
Source: "Censo de Población y Vivienda". National Statistics Institute.

According to the 2017 census by the National Statistics Institute (INE), the province spans an area of 13,433.3 km^{2} (5,187 sq mi) and had a population of 205,124 inhabitants (99,811 men and 105,313 women), giving it a population density of 15/km^{2} (39/sq mi). Of these, 151,057 (73.6%) lived in urban areas and 54,067 (26.4%) in rural areas. Between the 2002 and 2017 censuses, the population rose by 1.7% (3,509 persons).

== Malleco Valley wine region ==
Located 340 miles (540 km) south of the capital of Chile, Santiago, the Malleco wine region lies in the province of the same name. It is one of Chile’s southern Denomination of Origin (DO) regions as defined by the Chilean Appellation system, the legally protected geographical indication used to identify where the grapes for a wine were grown. The wine industry here is still developing but good results are already being obtained, particularly from its crispy and fresh Chardonnay and Pinot Noir. The climate is cool, with a high level of rainfall (51 inches (1300 mm) a year), a short growing season, and high temperature variation between day and night, which is challenging for wine producers. Most vineyards are located around the town of Traiguen, just south of the Bio Bio Valley. The volcanic soil in Malleco, composed mainly of sand and clay, are reasonably well drained. Although the valley has high rainfall, vines have to make extra effort to hydrate due to the well-drained soil, which results in less foliage and lower grape yields. All these factors produce grapes with more concentrated flavour and excellent structure, which in turn leads to the crisp and fresh wine produced in the region.

=== Grape distribution by varietal ===
- Climate: Cool Mediterranean climate. 1300 mm (51.2 in) of rain per year.
- Soils: Volcanic soils, clay and sand.
- Primary wines: Chardonnay and Pinot Noir.

Sauvignon Blanc: 3 ha (7 acres)	Chardonnay: 3 ha (7 acres)	Pinot Noir: 4 ha (10 acres)	Gewürztraminer: 1 ha (2 acres)

Total hectares planted: 11 ha (27 acres).

== See also ==
- Chilean wine
- Maule Region
- Maule River
- Maipo Valley
