= Lautaro, Chile =

Lautaro
- City and Commune
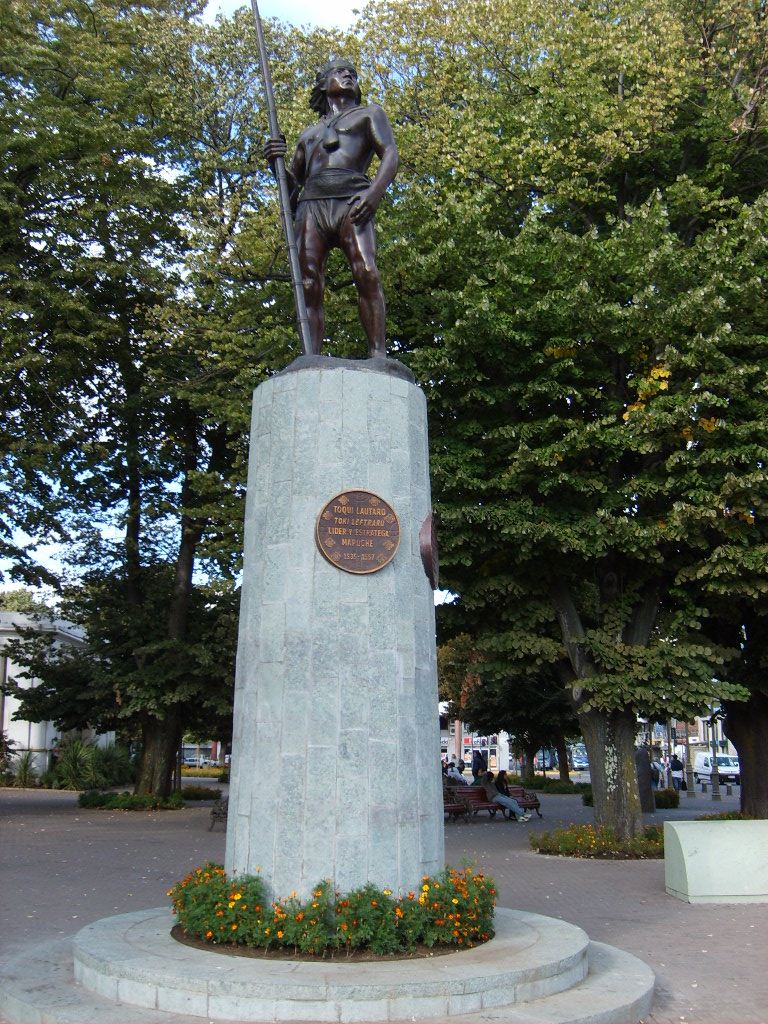

- Coat of arms Location in the Araucanía Region Location in Chile
- Coordinates: 38°31′S 72°27′W
- Country: Chile
- Region: Araucanía
- Province: Cautín
- Founded: 1881
- Named for: Lautaro

Government
  - Type: Municipality
  - Alcalde: Renato Hauri

Area
  - Total: 901.1 km^{2} (347.9 sq mi)
- Elevation: 234 m (768 ft)

Population (2012 Census)
  - Total: 34,268
  - Density: 38.03/km^{2} (98.49/sq mi)
  - Urban: 21,071
  - Rural: 11,147

Sex
  - Men: 15,991
  - Women: 16,227
- Time zone: UTC−4 (CLT)
  - Summer (DST): UTC−3 (CLST)
- Area code: 56 + 45
- Website: Official website (in Spanish)

Lautaro is a city and commune of the Cautín Province in Chile's Araucanía Region. The area is named in honor of Lautaro, Mapuche leader (toqui) during the War of Arauco.

== Demographics ==
Historical population
Year	Pop.	±% p.a.
1885	1,438	—
1895	9,325	+20.56%
1907	23,720	+8.09%
1920	25,113	+0.44%
1930	26,280	+0.46%
1940	27,634	+0.50%
1952	23,130	−1.47%
1970	24,855	+0.40%
1982	27,525	+0.85%
1992	28,725	+0.43%
2002	32,218	+1.15%
2017	38,013	+1.11%
2024	41,936	+1.41%
Source: "Censo de Población y Vivienda". National Statistics Institute.

According to the 2002 census of the National Statistics Institute, Lautaro spans an area of 901.1 km^{2} (348 sq mi) and has 32,218 inhabitants (15,991 men and 16,227 women). Of these, 21,071 (65.4%) lived in urban areas and 11,147 (34.6%) in rural areas. Between the 1992 and 2002 censuses, the population grew by 12.2% (3,493 persons).

== Administration ==
As a commune, Lautaro is a third-level administrative division of Chile administered by a communal council headed by an alcalde who is directly elected every four years. For the years 2008-2012, the alcalde is Renato Hauri, and the council members are:

- Raul Schifferli Diaz
- Miguel Jaramillo Salazar
- Carlos Gutierrez Olguin
- Ricardo Candia Morales
- Cristian Herrera González
- Hugo Salazar Becerra

Within the electoral divisions of Chile, Lautaro belongs to the 49th electoral district and 14th senatorial constituency.
