= Andrés Jouannet =

Chilean teacher and politician

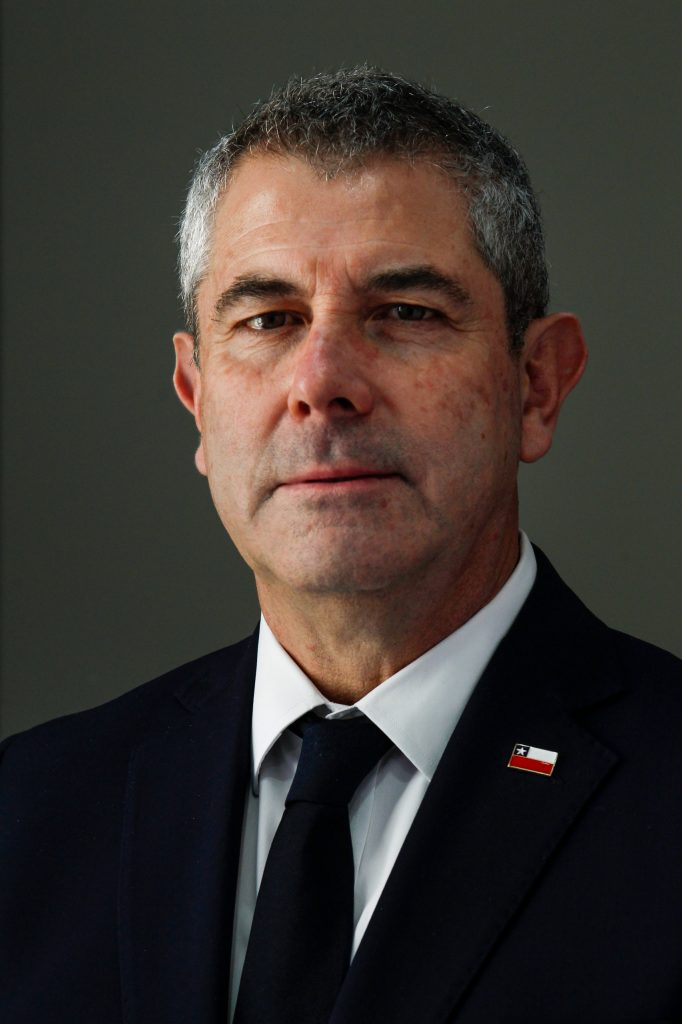
- Official portrait, 2026

Undersecretary of Public Security
- In office 11 March 2026 – 2 June 2026
- President: José Antonio Kast
- Preceded by: Rafael Collado
- Succeeded by: María Giannini

Member of the Chamber of Deputies
- In office 11 March 2022 – 11 March 2026
- Constituency: District 23

Intendant of the Araucanía Region
- In office 25 August 2015 – 11 November 2016
- Preceded by: Francisco Huenchumilla
- Succeeded by: Miguel Hernández Saffirio

Governor of Cautín Province
- In office 14 June 2008 – 10 December 2008
- Preceded by: Yolanda Pérez
- Succeeded by: Christian Dulansky

Personal details
- Born: 29 July 1967 (age 59) Temuco, Chile
- Other political affiliations: Amarillos por Chile (2022–2025); Christian Democratic Party (1984–2018)
- Education: University of La Frontera (BA); University of Chile (MA); University of Heidelberg (Ph.D)
- Occupation: Politician
- Profession: Historian

Andrés Alfonso Jouannet Valderrama (born 29 July 1967) is a Chilean school teacher, writer and politician. He previously served as the mayor of Araucanía Region during the second government of Michelle Bachelet. In 2026, from 11 March to 2 June, he served as Undersecretary of Public Security under José Antonio Kast's presidency.

Jouannet became a politician at the teen age of 17 when became active member of the Christian Democratic Youth of Chile. He was the president of the youth organization at the Universidad de la Frontera in Temuco and became close an ally of Gutenberg Martínez and Soledad Alvear. He served as a political secretary to former president Patricio Aylwin for five years.

During the first government of President Michelle Bachelet he was appointed governor of the province of Cautín but resigned form the position in 2008 same he was appointed to run for the house of Deputies election in District 52 scoring 8,988 votes placing fourth position in the contest.

He was appointed to the second government of Bachelet in 2014 as an advisor on indigenous affairs in the Ministry of Interior and later appointed Mayor of the Araucanía Region on 25 August 2015, replacing Francisco Huenchumilla. He left this position in 2016 to run in the 2017 parliamentary election which he lost. He ran again in 2021 as an independent candidate supported by Radical Party scoring 3.35 per cent of the votes to win the seat.

== Family and early life ==
He was born in Temuco on 29 July 1967, the son of Reinaldo Edmundo Jouannet Núñez and Juana Nora Valderrama López. His father is listed in the Valech Report as a victim of human rights violations committed during the military regime in Chile.

He has fifteen siblings, including David Jouannet, who has served as regional director of the National Forestry Corporation (CONAF) in the Araucanía Region since 2015.

He married Fabiana Cecilia Graieb on 5 October 2011.

== Professional life ==
He completed his secondary education at the Camilo Henríquez High School in Temuco in 1984.

He qualified as a teacher of history and geography at the University of La Frontera in Temuco.

He later obtained a PhD in philosophy, with a specialisation in political science, from the University of Heidelberg in Germany, through a scholarship awarded by the Konrad Adenauer Foundation. At the same institution, he earned a master's degree in history and a master's degree in political science. He also holds a master's degree in political science from the University of Chile.

He worked as a scientific researcher at the Max Planck Institute in Heidelberg and at the Ibero-American Institute in Berlin.

He has served as a professor in the Master's Programme in Government and Society at the Alberto Hurtado University and as an academic at the University of Communication Sciences and the Pontifical Catholic University of Chile.

In addition to being a panelist on the television programme Estado Nacional on Televisión Nacional de Chile, he has worked as a columnist for Chilean and Latin American media outlets and as an international consultant for the Konrad Adenauer Foundation.

For five years, he served as political secretary to former president Patricio Aylwin.

== Political career ==
He joined the Christian Democratic Party of Chile youth wing at the age of 17 and later served as president of the student body at the University of La Frontera in Temuco.

He held positions as Head of International Relations and Cooperation at the National Youth Institute of Chile and as an official in the Social Division of the Ministry of Planning.

In 2005, he served as a representative of the National Commission of the Social Stratification System and as Executive Secretary of the National Commission for Childhood.

He also worked as an advisor to the Ministry General Secretariat of the Presidency and the Ministry of Agriculture.

During the first administration of President Michelle Bachelet in 2008, he was appointed Governor of Cautín Province, a position he resigned from the same year in order to run for Congress in the 2010 elections for the former 52nd electoral district, although he was not elected.

In 2014, he joined the second Bachelet administration as an advisor to the Ministry of the Interior on indigenous affairs.

On 25 August 2015, he was appointed Intendant of the Araucanía Region, replacing Francisco Huenchumilla. He left the position in November 2016 in order to contest the 2017 parliamentary elections, in which he was again unsuccessful.

In the parliamentary elections held on 21 November 2021, he was elected to the Chamber of Deputies of Chile representing the 23rd electoral district of the Araucanía Region, comprising the communes of Carahue, Cholchol, Cunco, Curarrehue, Freire, Gorbea, Loncoche, Nueva Imperial, Padre Las Casas, Pitrufquén, Pucón, Saavedra, Temuco, Teodoro Schmidt, Toltén and Villarrica, as an independent candidate endorsed by the Radical Party of Chile within the New Social Pact coalition, for the 2022–2026 legislative term. He obtained 8,072 votes, equivalent to 3.35% of the valid votes cast.

After more than thirty years of membership in the Christian Democratic Party, in 2022 he joined the Amarillos por Chile movement. He has served as president of this party since 30 August 2023, following the resignation of Sergio Micco.

He ran for re-election in the 2025 parliamentary elections for the same district, representing Amarillos por Chile within the coalition of the same name, but was not elected. He obtained 12,618 votes, corresponding to 2.95% of the valid votes cast.

On 11 March 2026, he took office as Undersecretary of Public Security under José Antonio Kast's presidency. He left office on 2 June of the same year, and President Kast asked him to remain as part of his advisory team on the Second Floor of La Moneda.
