= District 23 (Chamber of Deputies of Chile) =

Electoral district of the Chamber of Deputies of Chile

- Distrito 23
- Electoral District for the Chamber of Deputies
- Location of District 23 within Chile
- Commune: List: Carahue; Cholchol; Cunco; Curarrehue; Freire; Gorbea; Loncoche; Nueva Imperial; Padre Las Casas; Pitrufquén; Pucón; Saavedra; Temuco; Teodoro Schmidt; Toltén; Villarrica
- Region: Araucanía
- Population: 660,897 (2017)
- Electorate: 601,444 (2021)
- Area: 14,045 km^{2} (2020)

Current Electoral District
- Created: 2017
- Seats: 7 (2017–present)
- Deputies: List: Miguel Becker (RN); Andrés Jouannet (AMA); Henry Leal (UDI); Miguel Mellado (RN); Coca Ericka Ñanco (FA); Mauricio Ojeda (Ind); Stephan Schubert (Ind)

District 23 (Spanish: Distrito 23) is one of the 28 multi-member electoral districts of the Chamber of Deputies, the lower house of the National Congress, the national legislature of Chile. The district was created by the 2015 electoral reform and came into being at the following general election in 2017. It consists of the communes of Carahue, Cholchol, Cunco, Curarrehue, Freire, Gorbea, Loncoche, Nueva Imperial, Padre Las Casas, Pitrufquén, Pucón, Saavedra, Temuco, Teodoro Schmidt, Toltén and Villarrica in the region of Araucanía. The district currently elects seven of the 155 members of the Chamber of Deputies using the open party-list proportional representation electoral system. At the 2021 general election the district had 601,444 registered electors.

== Electoral system ==
District 23 currently elects seven of the 155 members of the Chamber of Deputies using the open party-list proportional representation electoral system. Parties may form electoral pacts with each other to pool their votes and increase their chances of winning seats. However, the number of candidates nominated by an electoral pact may not exceed the maximum number of candidates that a single party may nominate. Seats are allocated using the D'Hondt method.

== Election results ==
=== Summary ===
Election	Apruebo Dignidad AD / FA			Green Ecologists PEV			Dignidad Ahora DA			New Social Pact NPS / NM			Democratic Convergence CD			Chile Vamos Podemos / Vamos			Party of the People PDG			Christian Social Front FSC		
Election	Votes	%	Seats	Votes	%	Seats	Votes	%	Seats	Votes	%	Seats	Votes	%	Seats	Votes	%	Seats	Votes	%	Seats	Votes	%	Seats
2021	26,942	11.19%	1	12,016	4.99%	0	18,692	7.77%	0	29,052	12.07%	1				79,838	33.17%	3	16,352	6.79%	0	45,038	18.71%	2
2017	13,203	5.88%	0							56,449	25.13%	2	14,555	6.48%	0	84,283	37.52%	4						

=== Detailed ===
==== 2021 ====
Results of the 2021 general election held on 21 November 2021:

Party		Pact	Party			Pact		
Party		Pact	Votes	%	Seats	Votes	%	Seats
National Renewal	RN	Chile Podemos +	41,336	17.17%	2	79,838	33.17%	3
Independent Democratic Union	UDI	Chile Podemos +	20,095	8.35%	1	79,838	33.17%	3
Evópoli	EVO	Chile Podemos +	18,407	7.65%	0	79,838	33.17%	3
Republican Party	REP	Christian Social Front	35,228	14.63%	2	45,038	18.71%	2
Christian Conservative Party	PCC	Christian Social Front	9,810	4.08%	0	45,038	18.71%	2
Radical Party of Chile	PR	New Social Pact	12,229	5.08%	1	29,052	12.07%	1
Party for Democracy	PPD	New Social Pact	11,318	4.70%	0	29,052	12.07%	1
Christian Democratic Party	PDC	New Social Pact	3,633	1.51%	0	29,052	12.07%	1
Socialist Party of Chile	PS	New Social Pact	1,872	0.78%	0	29,052	12.07%	1
Democratic Revolution	RD	Apruebo Dignidad	15,308	6.36%	1	26,942	11.19%	1
Communist Party of Chile	PC	Apruebo Dignidad	6,021	2.50%	0	26,942	11.19%	1
Social Green Regionalist Federation	FREVS	Apruebo Dignidad	5,613	2.33%	0	26,942	11.19%	1
Humanist Party	PH	Dignidad Ahora	9,449	3.93%	0	18,692	7.77%	0
Equality Party	IGUAL	Dignidad Ahora	9,243	3.84%	0	18,692	7.77%	0
Party of the People	PDG		16,352	6.79%	0	16,352	6.79%	0
Green Ecologist Party	PEV		12,016	4.99%	0	12,016	4.99%	0
United Centre	CU	United Independents	1,368	0.57%	0	8,504	3.53%	0
National Citizen Party	PNC	United Independents	7,136	2.96%	0	8,504	3.53%	0
Revolutionary Workers Party	PTR		2,682	1.11%	0	2,682	1.11%	0
Progressive Party	PRO		1,605	0.67%	0	1,605	0.67%	0
Valid votes			240,721	100.00%	7	240,721	100.00%	7
Blank votes			21,163	7.68%		21,163	7.68%	
Rejected votes – other			13,736	4.98%		13,736	4.98%	
Total polled			275,620	45.83%		275,620	45.83%	
Registered electors			601,444			601,444		

The following candidates were elected: Miguel Becker (RN), 16,360 votes; Andrés Jouannet (PR), 8,072 votes; Henry Leal (UDI), 17,973 votes; Miguel Mellado (RN), 14,164 votes; Coca Ericka Ñanco (RD), 9,715 votes; Mauricio Ojeda (REP), 14,901 votes; and Stephan Schubert (REP), 12,788 votes.

==== 2017 ====
Results of the 2017 general election held on 19 November 2017:

Party		Pact	Party			Pact		
Party		Pact	Votes	%	Seats	Votes	%	Seats
National Renewal	RN	Chile Vamos	38,365	17.08%	2	84,283	37.52%	4
Evópoli	EVO	Chile Vamos	31,063	13.83%	2	84,283	37.52%	4
Independent Democratic Union	UDI	Chile Vamos	14,855	6.61%	0	84,283	37.52%	4
Party for Democracy	PPD	Nueva Mayoría	30,040	13.37%	1	56,449	25.13%	2
Social Democrat Radical Party	PRSD	Nueva Mayoría	19,222	8.56%	1	56,449	25.13%	2
Socialist Party of Chile	PS	Nueva Mayoría	4,622	2.06%	0	56,449	25.13%	2
Communist Party of Chile	PC	Nueva Mayoría	2,565	1.14%	0	56,449	25.13%	2
René Saffirio (Independent)	Ind		38,578	17.17%	1	38,578	17.17%	1
Christian Democratic Party	PDC	Democratic Convergence	14,555	6.48%	0	14,555	6.48%	0
Humanist Party	PH	Broad Front	13,203	5.88%	0	13,203	5.88%	0
Amplitude	AMP	Sumemos	9,853	4.39%	0	9,853	4.39%	0
País	PAIS	All Over Chile	4,147	1.85%	0	5,615	2.50%	0
Progressive Party	PRO	All Over Chile	1,468	0.65%	0	5,615	2.50%	0
Patricio Rivas Gatica (Independent)	Ind		2,090	0.93%	0	2,090	0.93%	0
Valid votes			224,626	100.00%	7	224,626	100.00%	7
Blank votes			17,796	7.05%		17,796	7.05%	
Rejected votes – other			9,981	3.95%		9,981	3.95%	
Total polled			252,403	44.31%		252,403	44.31%	
Registered electors			569,616			569,616		

The following candidates were elected: Sebastián Álvarez Ramírez (EVO), 5,319 votes; Ricardo Celis Araya (PPD), 16,335 votes; René Manuel García (RN), 23,118 votes; Miguel Mellado (RN), 13,708 votes; Fernando Meza Moncada (PRSD), 13,696 votes; Andrés Molina (EVO), 23,927 votes; and René Saffirio (Ind), 38,578 votes.
