= Stephan Schubert =

Chilean politician

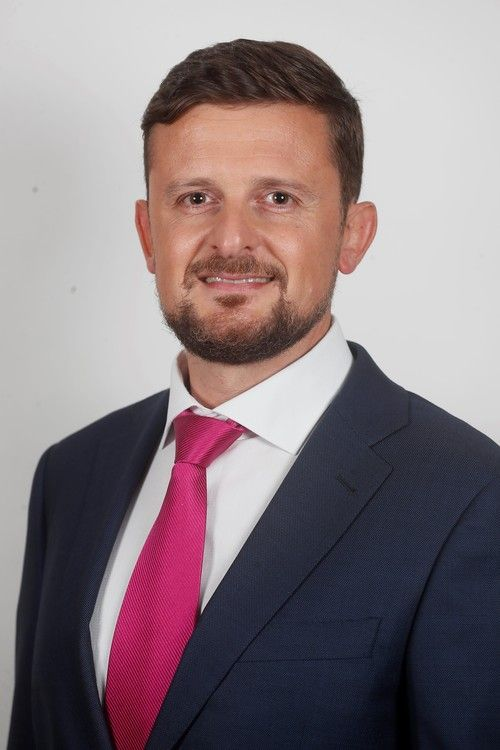
- Official portrait, 2022

Member of the Chamber of Deputies
- Incumbent
- Assumed office 11 March 2022
- Constituency: District 23

Personal details
- Born: 19 December 1977 (age 48) Providencia, Chile
- Party: Republican
- Spouse: Mariana Figueroa
- Children: 3
- Parent(s): Heriberto Schubert; María Loreto Rubio
- Education: Diego Portales University (LL.B); Universidad Mayor (M.D.); Temuco Catholic University (PgD)
- Occupation: Politician
- Profession: Lawyer

Stephan Herbert Schubert Rubio (born 19 December 1977) is a Chilean lawyer and politician who serves as deputy of district 23 since 2022.

== Early life and background ==
He was born on 19 December 1977 in Providencia, Chile. He is the son of Heriberto Adalbert Schubert Poseck y María Loreto Rubio Covarrubias. His father was from the Araucania Region and his mother is from Talca, and due to his father's various jobs, Schubert lived in many places during his childhood and teenage years, including Talca, Santiago, San Javier, Arica, and Temuco.

== Education and profesional career ==
He completed his secondary education at the British Royal School in the commune of La Reina in 1996. He is a lawyer and holds a licentiate degree in Legal and Social Sciences from the Diego Portales University. He also holds a Master's degree in Taxation and Business Law from the Universidad Mayor and a diploma in Contemporary Issues in Criminal Law and Criminal Procedure: Oral Litigation and Forensic Medicine from the Temuco Catholic University.

In his professional career, he worked as a lawyer at the law firm Ulloa, Monje & Schubert. He has also served as a lecturer in Public International Law and Oral Litigation at the School of Law of the Universidad Mayor, Temuco campus.

Schubert is a member of two evangelical Christian foundations, Advocates Chile and Destaca. He previously served as vice president of the former and currently serves as director of the latter.

== Political career ==
He ran as an independent candidate for the Constitutional Convention for the 23rd District, without being elected. Following this process, he decided to run for Congress after obtaining the second-highest vote total in that election, with the stated aim of contributing to the construction of a better society.

In the parliamentary elections held on 21 November 2021, he was elected Deputy for the 23rd District of the Araucanía Region—comprising the communes of Carahue, Cholchol, Cunco, Curarrehue, Freire, Gorbea, Loncoche, Nueva Imperial, Padre Las Casas, Pitrufquén, Pucón, Saavedra, Temuco, Teodoro Schmidt, Toltén, and Villarrica—as an independent candidate within the Frente Social Cristiano electoral pact, supported by the Republican Party of Chile. He obtained 12,778 votes, equivalent to 5.31% of the valid votes cast.

Since 12 December 2024, he has been a member of the Republican Party. As a deputy, on issues related to the Araucanía Region, he has demanded a strategy to combat terrorism and drug trafficking, as well as for those responsible for the financial crisis at the University of La Frontera to be held accountable. Regarding pensions, he has expressed support for increasing the Universal Guaranteed Pension (PGU) and emphasized that pension funds should be allocated to contributors' individual accounts rather than to the State.

In 2026, he became chair of the Foreign Affairs Committee of the Chamber of Deputies.

== Personal life ==
Schubert married in 2006 and has three children with his wife; the family resides in Temuco, in the Araucanía Region. He is an evangelical Christian and also speaks fluent English.
