= Rojo Edwards =

Chilean politician and civil engineer (born 1977)

- Official portrait, 2026

Member of the Senate
- Incumbent
- Assumed office 11 March 2022
- Constituency: 7th Circunscription

Member of the Chamber of Deputies
- In office 11 March 2010 – 11 March 2018
- Preceded by: Eduardo Díaz del Río
- Succeeded by: Dissolution of the district
- Constituency: 51st District (Cholchol, Freire, Nueva Imperial, Pitrufquén, Saavedra and Teodoro Schmidt)

Personal details
- Born: José Manuel Ismael Edwards Silva; 15 July 1977 (age 49) Chicago, Illinois, U.S.
- Party: National Renewal (2009–2016/2019); Republican Party (2019–2023); Christian Social Party (2024–2025)
- Education: Pontifical Catholic University of Chile (BA); Harvard Kennedy School (MA)
- Occupation: Politician
- Profession: Civil engineer

José Manuel Rojo Edwards Silva (born José Manuel Ismael Edwards Silva; 15 July 1977) is a Chilean politician and civil engineer serving as senator for the Santiago Metropolitan Region. He previously served in the Chamber of Deputies.

== Studies ==
Rojo Edwards pursued his undergraduate studies at the Chilean Catholic University, becoming Industrial Engineer in 2002. During the year 2000, he participated in the exchange program at the University of New South Wales in Sydney, Australia.

He graduated as an engineer with the highest honors granted by his university. He obtained the “FIUC Award” granted by his university's Engineers Foundation to the most outstanding student demonstrating academic excellence, leadership and dedication to service.

Upon obtaining his Transport Engineering specialization, he obtained the distinguished “Ismael Valdés Valdés Award”, granted by the Chilean Institute of Engineers to the engineering graduate that demonstrates an outstanding combination of leadership capabilities, technical preparation and social values.

In 2007, he completed his master's degree in Public Policy at the John F. Kennedy School of Government at Harvard University. Harvard University awarded him the Catherine B. Reynolds Fellowship for Social Entrepreneurship.

== Work experience ==
During 2006, he completed an internship with the trustee of the Universidad de Chile Soccer Team, José Manuel Edwards.

Between 2007 and 2009, he worked as an associate investment officer for the financing of large infrastructure projects in Latin America at the Inter-American Development Bank (IDB) in Washington DC.

In May 2019, Rojo Edwards founded “Ideas Republicanas” (IR). IR is think tank connected to the Chilean Republican Party. Rojo Edwards served as its president and executive director up until March 2022. During his tenure, he co-authored and edited IR's book called “Ruta Republicana”.

== Humanitarian work ==
In 1997, he co-founded the initiative “2000 Mediaguas for the 2000s”, the direct antecedent of Un Techo para Chile. He was part of the group of young people that called on students from different universities to build 2.000 emergency shelters for the underprivileged, before the year 2000. This goal was achieved by September 1999. This success led to the creation of the NGO “Un Techo para Chile”. Rojo Edwards assumed as "Director of Construction" in 2004, leading the construction of 4.500 mediaguas (emergency housing) in Chile.

As a Chilean Senator, Rojo Edwards promoted and acted as rapporteur of the emergency item "Raising awareness and calling for action on the serious humanitarian crises affecting the peoples of Afghanistan, Syria, Ukraine, Yemen, and other countries, and the special vulnerability of women and children", which was approved unanimously during the Inter-Parliamentary Union Assembly held in the city of Manama (Bahrain) between March 11 and 15, 2023. The resolution calls on the international community to confront with concrete action, the multiple humanitarian crises affecting 340 million people around the world.

== Chamber of Deputies ==
Edwards entered into the center-right party National Renewal in 2009. In December of that year he was elected as deputy for the Araucanía Region for the period of 2010–2014. He was reelected in 2013. On September 28, 2016, he announced his resignation from militancy in National Renewal. He tried to be senator in the 2017 election for the Araucanía Region, but did not get enough votes. In 2019 he entered into the Republican Party.

== Senate ==
In 2021 Chilean general election, Edwards supported José Antonio Kast's candidacy, and he ran again to be senator for the Santiago Metropolitan Region, obtaining the third mayority thus being a senator for the Republican Party. He was the first Latin American parliamentarian to visit Ukraine in early May 2022. He was part of the organization of President Zelenskyy's first address to a Latin American audience at Catholic University of Santiago. For the 145th World Inter-Parlamientary Union, senator Edwards wrote and defended IPU's emergency item, condemning the annexation of Ukrainian territories by Russia. This resolution was approved by consensus, with only 5 countries to abstain (India, Mozambique, South Sudán, South Africa and Yemen).

In January 2022, Edwards became the president of the Republican Party. He would later quit the party and joined the PSC.

== Awards ==
- In January 2026, the Ukraine government awarded him the Recipients of the Order of Merit, 3rd class
