= Freire, Chile =

Freire
- Town and Commune
- Location in Chile
- Coordinates: 38°57′21″S 72°37′32″W
- Country: Chile
- Region: Araucanía
- Province: Cautín
- Founded: 7 December 1882

Government
  - Type: Municipality
  - Alcalde: Luis Armando Arias Lopez (2021-2025)

Area
  - Total: 935.2 km^{2} (361.1 sq mi)
- As of 2012 Census
- Elevation: 88 m (289 ft)

Population (2017 Census)
  - Total: 22,390
  - Density: 23.94/km^{2} (62.01/sq mi)
- Demonym: Freirense

Sex
- Time zone: UTC−4 (CLT)
  - Summer (DST): UTC−3 (CLST)
- Area code: 56 + 45
- Website: Municipality of Freire

Freire is a Chilean town and commune in Cautín Province, Araucanía Region. According to the 2012 census, the commune population was 21,750 and has an area of 935.2 km^{2} (361 sq mi).

The town of Freire lies at the junction of Chile Highway 5 and Route CH-199, which links Freire with Villarrica and Pucón.

== Demographics ==
Historical population
Year	Pop.	±% p.a.
1895	1,727	—
1907	3,704	+6.57%
1920	12,901	+10.07%
1930	25,532	+7.06%
1940	27,654	+0.80%
1952	22,262	−1.79%
1970	19,671	−0.69%
1982	21,486	+0.74%
1992	22,997	+0.68%
2002	25,514	+1.04%
2017	24,606	−0.24%
2024	26,164	+0.88%
Source: "Censo de Población y Vivienda". National Statistics Institute.

According to the 2017 census of Population and Housing by the National Statistics Institute (Instituto Nacional de Estadísticas or INE) Freire had 25,514 inhabitants; of these, 10,979 (38.9%) lived in urban areas and 20,531 (92.1%) in rural areas. At that time, there were 17,670 men and 16,560 women. The population grew by 10.9% (2,517 persons) between the 2012 and 2017 censuses.

== Administration ==
As a commune, Freire is a third-level administrative division of Chile administered by a municipal council, headed by an alcalde who is directly elected every four years. The 2021-2025 alcalde is Luis Armando Arias Lopez, and the council has the following members:

- Luis García Friz
- Luis Marchant Morales
- Sebastian Daniel Rojas Rivera
- Yanina Barría Rojas
- Patricio Ríos González
- José Oñate Orias

Within the electoral divisions of Chile, Freire is represented in the Chamber of Deputies as a part of the 23rd electoral district (together with Cholchol, Temuco, Padre Las Casas, Nueva Imperial, Carahue, Cunco, Puerto Saavedra, Teodoro Schmidt, Pitrufquén, Nueva Toltén, Gorbea, Loncoche, Villarrica, Pucón, Curarrehue). The commune is represented in the Senate as part of the 11th senatorial constituency (Araucanía-South).
