= List of cities in Chile =

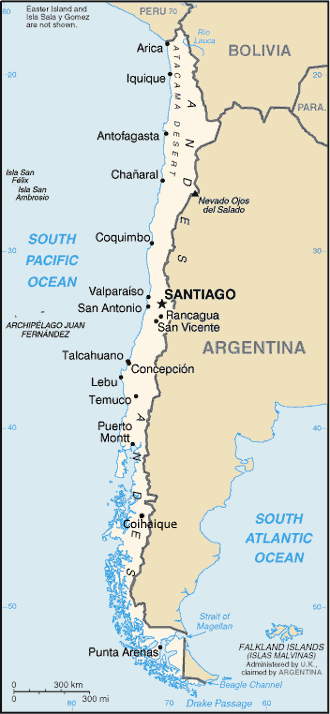
Map of Chile

This is a list of cities in Chile.

A city is defined by Chile's National Statistics Institute (INE) as an "urban entity" (Note: An "urban entity" is defined by Chile's National Statistics Institute as a concentrated group of dwellings with over 2,000 inhabitants, or between 1,001 and 2,000 inhabitants if 50% or more of its population is economically active, dedicated to secondary and/or tertiary activities. Exceptionally, populated centers dedicated to tourism and recreation with over 250 concentrated dwellings and that do not meet the population requirement are considered urban.) with more than 5,000 inhabitants. This list is based on a June 2005 report by the INE based on the 2002 census which registered 239 cities across the country.

== Complete list of cities by region ==
Region	City	Population (2017 census)	Population (2002 census)	Area (km^{2})	Density (/km^{2})
Arica and Parinacota Region	Arica	221,364	175,441	41.89	4,188
Tarapacá	Iquique	191,468	164,396	22.12	7,432
Tarapacá	Alto Hospicio	108,375	50,190	17.45	2,876
Tarapacá	Pozo Almonte	15,711	6,384	3.05	2,093
Antofagasta	Antofagasta	361,873	285,255	43.54	6,552
Antofagasta	Calama	165,371	126,135	18.21	6,927
Antofagasta	Tocopilla	25,186	23,352	7.00	3,336
Antofagasta	Chuquicamata	0	10,465	4.70	2,227
Antofagasta	Taltal	13,317	9,564	3.45	2,772
Antofagasta	Estación Zaldívar		9,053	0.12	75,442
Antofagasta	Mejillones	13,467	7,825	4.67	1,676
Antofagasta	María Elena	6,457	7,412	1.52	4,876
Atacama	Copiapó	174,309	125,983	47.77	2,637
Atacama	Vallenar	51,917	43,750	13.91	3,145
Atacama	Caldera	17,662	12,776	8.48	1,507
Atacama	Chañaral	12,219	12,086	7.34	1,647
Atacama	El Salvador		8,697	3.35	2,596
Atacama	Tierra Amarilla	14,019	8,578	13.48	636
Atacama	Diego de Almagro	13,925	7,951	4.05	1,963
Atacama	Huasco	10,149	6,445	2.73	2,361
Coquimbo	Coquimbo	256,735	148,438	41.82	3,549
Coquimbo	La Serena	249,656	147,815	65.59	2,254
Coquimbo	Ovalle	121,269	66,405	11.46	5,795
Coquimbo	Illapel		21,826	7.39	2,953
Coquimbo	Vicuña	29,721	12,910	4.68	2,759
Coquimbo	Salamanca	29,110	11,615	4.37	2,658
Coquimbo	Los Vilos	23,374	10,966	4.11	2,668
Coquimbo	Andacollo	11,044	9,444	3.34	2,828
Coquimbo	Combarbalá	13,322	5,494	2.20	2,497
Coquimbo	El Palqui	6,175	5,266	1.36	3,872
Coquimbo	Monte Patria	30,751	5,219	2.35	2,221
Valparaíso	Viña del Mar	334,248	286,931	87.33	3,286
Valparaíso	Valparaíso	296,655	263,499	47.33	5,567
Valparaíso	Quilpué	151,708	126,893	38.06	3,334
Valparaíso	Villa Alemana	126,548	94,802	31.26	3,033
Valparaíso	San Antonio	91,350	83,435	21.02	3,969
Valparaíso	Quillota	90,517	62,231	15.13	4,113
Valparaíso	Los Andes	66,708	55,127	16.42	3,357
Valparaíso	San Felipe	76,844	53,017	18.11	2,927
Valparaíso	La Calera	50,544	47,836	16.18	2,956
Valparaíso	Limache	46,121	34,948	18.63	1,876
Valparaíso	Concón	42,152	31,558	26.00	1,214
Valparaíso	Quintero	31,923	18,719	17.01	1,100
Valparaíso	La Ligua	35,390	17,048	5.18	3,291
Valparaíso	Llay-Llay	24,608	16,215	6.56	2,472
Valparaíso	Cartagena	22,738	15,302	14.05	1,089
Valparaíso	Casablanca	26,827	14,437	7.02	2,057
Valparaíso	Cabildo	19,388	11,287	4.68	2,412
Valparaíso	Placilla de Peñuelas	39,344	10,811	6.71	1,611
Valparaíso	La Cruz	22,098	10,611	14.03	756
Valparaíso	Olmué	17,516	10,379	19.07	544
Valparaíso	El Melón		9,729	5.68	1,713
Valparaíso	Nogales	22,120	8,969	3.84	2,336
Valparaíso	El Quisco	15,955	8,931	16.02	557
Valparaíso	Hijuelas	17,988	8,196	7.81	1,049
Valparaíso	San Esteban	18,855	7,542	6.81	1,107
Valparaíso	Putaendo	16,754	7,214	7.68	939
Valparaíso	Catemu	13,998	6,706	3.45	1,944
Valparaíso	Santa María	15,241	6,443	6.10	1,056
Valparaíso	Las Ventanas	8,630	5,957	12.84	464
Valparaíso	Algarrobo	13,817	5,827	11.38	512
Valparaíso	Rinconada	10,207	5,727	13.51	424
Valparaíso	Calle Larga (Note: Urban entity with less than 5,001 inhabitants, which is not part of a conurbation, yet still considered a city, possibly to account for census omission.)	14,832	4,966	3.82	1,300
Valparaíso	Santo Domingo (Note: Entity with 5,000 or less inhabitants that is part of a larger city from a neighboring commune.)	10,900	4,583	13.83	331
Valparaíso	El Tabo	13,286	3,823	12.44	307
Santiago Metropolitan Region	Puente Alto	568,106	492,603	63.73	7,730
Santiago Metropolitan	Maipú	521,627	463,103	54.89	8,437
Santiago Metropolitan	La Florida	366,916	365,563	39.07	9,357
Santiago Metropolitan	Las Condes	294,838	249,893	99.17	2,520
Santiago Metropolitan	San Bernardo	301,313	237,708	51.61	4,606
Santiago Metropolitan	Peñalolén	241,599	216,060	54.41	3,971
Santiago Metropolitan	Santiago	7,123,891	4,657,000	23.20	8,655
Santiago Metropolitan	Pudahuel	240,819	192,258	17.92	10,729
Santiago Metropolitan	La Pintana	177,355	190,085	30.71	6,190
Santiago Metropolitan	El Bosque	162,505	175,594	14.31	12,271
Santiago Metropolitan	Ñuñoa	255,823	163,511	16.86	9,698
Santiago Metropolitan	Cerro Navia	139,604	148,312	11.00	13,483
Santiago Metropolitan	Recoleta	157,851	148,220	15.84	9,357
Santiago Metropolitan	Renca	147,151	133,518	24.00	5,563
Santiago Metropolitan	Conchalí	133,420	133,256	11.04	12,070
Santiago Metropolitan	La Granja	122,518	132,520	10.03	13,212
Santiago Metropolitan	Estación Central	148,730	130,394	14.43	9,036
Santiago Metropolitan	Quilicura	222,048	125,999	38.72	3,254
Santiago Metropolitan	Providencia	147,826	120,874	14.34	8,429
Santiago Metropolitan	Pedro Aguirre Cerda	106,257	114,560	8.91	12,857
Santiago Metropolitan	Lo Espejo	103,454	112,800	8.45	13,349
Santiago Metropolitan	Macul	123,420	112,535	12.85	8,758
Santiago Metropolitan	Lo Prado	100,771	104,316	6.55	15,926
Santiago Metropolitan	Quinta Normal	118,503	104,012	11.87	8,763
Santiago Metropolitan	San Joaquín	99,371	97,625	9.89	9,871
Santiago Metropolitan	La Reina	96,811	96,762	23.73	4,078
Santiago Metropolitan	San Ramón	86,770	94,906	6.37	14,899
Santiago Metropolitan	La Cisterna	95,652	85,118	10.04	8,478
Santiago Metropolitan	Vitacura	88,716	81,499	28.63	2,847
Santiago Metropolitan	San Miguel	114,641	78,872	9.71	8,123
Santiago Metropolitan	Huechuraba	103,962	74,070	21.20	3,494
Santiago Metropolitan	Lo Barnechea	109,778	72,278	54.83	1,318
Santiago Metropolitan	Cerrillos	85,026	71,906	16.61	4,329
Santiago Metropolitan	Independencia	105,437	65,479	7.42	8,825
Santiago Metropolitan	Peñaflor	95,420	63,209	15.56	4,062
Santiago Metropolitan	Colina	152,740	58,769	14.46	4,064
Santiago Metropolitan	Melipilla	133,232	53,522	10.63	5,035
Santiago Metropolitan	Talagante	77,899	49,957	10.68	4,678
Santiago Metropolitan	Buin	101,743	40,091	14.61	2,744
Santiago Metropolitan	Padre Hurtado	67,299	34,257	7.42	4,617
Santiago Metropolitan	El Monte	37,901	22,284	14.16	1,574
Santiago Metropolitan	Paine	76,659	19,620	6.01	3,265
Santiago Metropolitan	Curacaví	34,337	15,645	6.62	2,363
Santiago Metropolitan	Lampa	107,662	12,319	5.63	2,188
Santiago Metropolitan	Isla de Maipo	37,965	12,295	9.79	1,256
Santiago Metropolitan	La Islita		6,570	1.98	3,318
Santiago Metropolitan	Bajos de San Agustín		6,511	2.68	2,429
Santiago Metropolitan	Hospital		5,664	17.55	323
Santiago Metropolitan	Alto Jahuel	7,859	5,415	1.74	3,112
Santiago Metropolitan	San José de Maipo	17,540	5,281	3.46	1,526
Santiago Metropolitan	Tiltil	20,268	5,168	2.40	2,153
Santiago Metropolitan	Pirque	28,010	4,855	12.22	397
O'Higgins	Rancagua	241,774	206,971	50.36	4,110
O'Higgins	San Fernando	76,009	49,519	12.37	4,003
O'Higgins	Rengo	61,438	30,891	9.28	3,329
O'Higgins	Machalí	55,258	23,920	16.19	1,477
O'Higgins	Graneros	34,828	21,615	3.61	5,988
O'Higgins	San Vicente de Tagua Tagua	48,801	18,914	13.86	1,365
O'Higgins	Santa Cruz	39,540	18,603	8.26	2,252
O'Higgins	Chimbarongo	35,399	13,795	11.67	1,182
O'Higgins	Mostazal	25,343	12,037	3.49	3,449
O'Higgins	Pichilemu	16,394	9,027	9.70	931
O'Higgins	Requínoa	27,968	8,240	2.65	3,109
O'Higgins	Lo Miranda	11,095	8,188	9.17	893
O'Higgins	Doñihue	20,887	7,402	4.32	1,713
O'Higgins	Peumo	14,313	7,392	5.13	1,441
O'Higgins	Nancagua	17,833	6,846	2.26	3,029
O'Higgins	Las Cabras	24,640	6,190	2.77	2,235
O'Higgins	Quinta de Tilcoco	13,002	5,850	5.01	1,168
O'Higgins	Gultro	5,423	5,472	3.29	1,663
O'Higgins	Codegua	12,988	5,113	4.01	1,275
O'Higgins	Palmilla	12,482	2,088	5.43	385
Maule	Talca	242,344	189,505	46.04	4,116
Maule	Curicó	149,530	93,447	20.50	4,558
Maule	Linares	93,602	65,133	16.16	4,031
Maule	Constitución	46,068	33,914	8.68	3,907
Maule	Cauquenes	40,441	30,771	13.40	2,296
Maule	Molina	45,976	27,203	8.50	3,200
Maule	Parral	41,637	26,397	7.85	3,363
Maule	San Javier	45,547	20,524	7.42	2,766
Maule	San Clemente	43,269	13,398	5.77	2,322
Maule	Teno	30,850	6,729	3.03	2,221
Maule	Longaví	30,534	6,206	2.71	2,290
Maule	Villa Alegre	16,221	5,456	3.96	1,378
Maule	Hualañé	9,657	5,198	2.64	1,969
Biobío	Concepción	220,746	212,003	55.95	3,789
Biobío	Talcahuano	158,038	161,692	50.65	3,192
Biobío	Chillán	184,739	146,701	33.41	4,391
Biobío	Los Ángeles	212,875	117,972	27.35	4,313
Biobío	Coronel	116,262	91,469	24.52	3,730
Biobío	Hualpén	96,109	85,928	19.48	4,411
Biobío	Chiguayante	90,068	81,238	33.97	2,391
Biobío	San Pedro de la Paz	131,808	80,159	49.09	1,633
Biobío	Lota	45,920	48,975	9.63	5,086
Biobío	Penco	49,371	45,361	12.01	3,777
Biobío	Tomé	58,076	41,198	10.44	3,946
Biobío	Curanilahue	33,701	30,126	5.46	5,518
Biobío	San Carlos	55,278	29,359	9.06	3,241
Biobío	Mulchén	30,836	21,819	4.49	4,859
Biobío	Nacimiento	27,752	20,884	10.88	1,919
Biobío	Lebu	26,927	20,838	4.92	4,235
Biobío	Cañete	36,448	19,839	8.99	2,207
Biobío	Chillán Viejo	32,166	18,827	7.62	2,471
Biobío	Arauco	38,274	16,291	6.96	2,341
Biobío	La Laja	32,541	16,288	6.77	2,406
Biobío	Hualqui	25,552	13,724	7.35	1,867
Biobío	Los Álamos	22,067	13,035	6.90	1,889
Biobío	Cabrero	30,229	11,947	3.31	3,609
Biobío	Bulnes	22,329	10,681	3.09	3,457
Biobío	Coelemu	16,704	9,845	3.54	2,781
Biobío	Yungay	18,296	9,288	4.16	2,233
Biobío	Yumbel	21,958	8,302	2.58	3,218
Biobío	Quirihue	12,076	7,952	2.23	3,566
Biobío	Quillón	18,247	7,285	4.15	1,755
Biobío	Coihueco	27,680	7,230	2.66	2,718
Biobío	Santa Juana	14,602	7,095	2.35	3,019
Biobío	Santa Bárbara	14,461	6,838	2.35	2,910
Biobío	Huépil		6,576	2.56	2,569
Biobío	Monte Águila		6,090	1.91	3,188
Biobío	San Rosendo	3,644	3,249	2.22	1,464
Araucanía	Temuco	295,839	227,086	46.10	4,926
Araucanía	Angol	55,140	43,801	14.94	2,932
Araucanía	Padre Las Casas	79,019	33,697	7.13	4,726
Araucanía	Villarrica	57,466	27,408	8.13	3,371
Araucanía	Victoria	35,219	23,977	7.54	3,180
Araucanía	Lautaro	39,614	18,808	5.80	3,243
Araucanía	Nueva Imperial	33,273	14,980	3.01	4,977
Araucanía	Collipulli	25,681	14,240	4.30	3,312
Araucanía	Loncoche	24,571	14,191	6.54	2,170
Araucanía	Traiguén	19,275	14,140	4.92	2,874
Araucanía	Pucón	28,796	13,750	9.53	1,443
Araucanía	Pitrufquén	25,549	13,420	3.90	3,441
Araucanía	Curacautín	18,054	12,412	4.58	2,710
Araucanía	Carahue	25,369	9,459	2.45	3,861
Araucanía	Gorbea	15,140	7,852	3.07	2,558
Araucanía	Purén	12,223	7,604	2.76	2,755
Araucanía	Cunco	17,992	7,316	1.95	3,752
Araucanía	Labranza	40,000	5,442	2.27	2,397
Araucanía	Freire	25,278	5,388	1.30	4,145
Araucanía	Renaico	10,634	5,355	1.67	3,207
Los Ríos	Valdivia	171,725	127,750	42.39	3,014
Los Ríos	La Unión	39,281	25,615	10.03	2,554
Los Ríos	Río Bueno	32,770	15,054	6.94	2,169
Los Ríos	Panguipulli	35,619	11,142	4.63	2,406
Los Ríos	Paillaco	20,575	9,973	2.78	3,587
Los Ríos	Los Lagos	20,430	9,479	5.40	1,755
Los Ríos	Lanco	17,264	7,817	2.56	3,054
Los Ríos	Mariquina	22,532	7,790	2.35	3,315
Los Ríos	Futrono	15,240	6,603	2.37	2,786
Los Lagos	Puerto Montt	245,902	153,118	39.58	3,869
Los Lagos	Osorno	170,129	132,245	31.82	4,156
Los Lagos	Castro	46,390	29,148	7.84	3,718
Los Lagos	Ancud	42,231	27,292	8.82	3,094
Los Lagos	Puerto Varas	46,283	22,022	9.26	2,378
Los Lagos	Quellón	28,499	13,656	3.21	4,254
Los Lagos	Calbuco	35,813	12,165	4.58	2,656
Los Lagos	Purranque	21,092	11,618	5.23	2,221
Los Lagos	Llanquihue	18,328	11,447	3.90	2,935
Los Lagos	Frutillar	19,649	9,118	4.11	2,218
Los Lagos	Río Negro	14,373	6,583	3.85	1,710
Los Lagos	Fresia	12,677	6,144	3.22	1,908
Los Lagos	Los Muermos	17,731	5,707	3.61	1,581
Aysén	Coyhaique	60,005	44,850	18.27	2,455
Aysén	Puerto Aysén	27,644	16,936	7.42	2,282
Magallanes	Punta Arenas	136,476	116,005	39.03	2,972
Magallanes	Puerto Natales	21,477	16,978	5.57	3,048

== Largest urban agglomerations ==
This list includes conurbations, "absorptions" and cities with over 100,000 inhabitants, according to the 2017 census.

	Urban Entity	Region	Population (2017)
1	Greater Santiago	Metropolitana de Santiago	6,139,087
2	Greater Valparaíso	Valparaíso	935,602
3	Greater Concepción	Biobío	719,944
4	Greater La Serena	Coquimbo	399,450
5	Antofagasta	Antofagasta	348,517
6	Greater Temuco	Araucanía	312,503
7	Greater Iquique	Tarapacá	293,068
8	Greater Rancagua	O'Higgins	290,029
9	Puerto Montt and Puerto Varas	Los Lagos	238,175
10	Greater Talca	Maule	236,347
11	Arica	Arica y Parinacota	202,131
12	Greater Chillán	Ñuble	191,629
13	Calama	Antofagasta	157,575
14	Coronel and Lota	Biobío	155,329
15	Copiapó	Atacama	150,804
16	Valdivia	Los Ríos	150,048
17	Greater Quillota	Valparaíso	149,159
18	Osorno	Los Lagos	147,666
19	Los Ángeles	Biobío	143,023
20	Curicó	Maule	125,275
21	Punta Arenas	Magallanes	123,403
22	San Antonio	Valparaíso	118,668

== See also ==
- List of towns in Chile
- Communes of Chile
