= Gorbea, Chile =

Gorbea
- City and Commune
- Flag Coat of arms Location of Gorbea commune in the Araucanía Region Location in Chile
- Coordinates: 39°06′S 72°41′W
- Country: Chile
- Region: Araucanía
- Province: Cautín
- Gorbea: 1887

Government
  - Type: Municipality
  - Alcalde: Guido Siegmund González (UDI)

Area
  - Total: 694.5 km^{2} (268.1 sq mi)
- Elevation: 80 m (260 ft)

Population (2017 Census)
  - Total: 14,414
  - Density: 20.75/km^{2} (53.75/sq mi)
  - Urban: 10,160
  - Rural: 4,254

Sex
  - Men: 6,945
  - Women: 7,469
- Time zone: UTC−4 (CLT)
  - Summer (DST): UTC−3 (CLST)
- Area code: 56 + 45
- Website: Municipality of Gorbea

Gorbea is a Chilean city and commune located in Cautín Province, Araucanía Region.

== Demographics ==
Historical population
| Year | Pop. | ±% p.a. |
|---|---|---|
| 1895 | 1,763 | — |
| 1907 | 9,072 | +14.63% |
| 1920 | 10,353 | +1.02% |
| 1930 | 11,941 | +1.44% |
| 1940 | 17,227 | +3.73% |
| 1952 | 15,587 | −0.83% |
| 1970 | 12,514 | −1.21% |
| 1982 | 14,129 | +1.02% |
| 1992 | 14,652 | +0.36% |
| 2002 | 15,222 | +0.38% |
| 2017 | 14,414 | −0.36% |
| 2024 | 14,148 | −0.27% |
Source: "Censo de Población y Vivienda". National Statistics Institute.

According to the 2002 census of the National Statistics Institute, Gorbea spans an area of 694.5 km^{2} (268 sq mi) and has 15,222 inhabitants (7,609 men and 7,613 women). Of these, 9,413 (61.8%) lived in urban areas and 5,809 (38.2%) in rural areas. Between the 1992 and 2002 censuses, the population grew by 3.9% (570 persons).

The commune's largest settlements are Gorbea, Lastarria and Quitratué.

== Administration ==
As a commune, Gorbea is a third-level administrative division of Chile administered by a municipal council, headed by an alcalde who is directly elected every four years. The 2016-2020 alcalde is Guido Siegmund González (UDI).

Within the electoral divisions of Chile, Gorbea is represented in the Chamber of Deputies by René Manuel García (RN) and Fernando Meza (PRSD) as part of the 52nd electoral district, together with Cunco, Pucón, Curarrehue, Villarrica, Loncoche and Toltén. The commune is represented in the Senate by José Garcia Ruminot (RN) and Eugenio Tuma Zedan (PPD) as part of the 15th senatorial constituency (Araucanía-South).

== Education ==
Previously the area had a German school, Deutsche Schule Gorbea.
