= Galvarino, Chile =

Galvarino
- Town and Commune
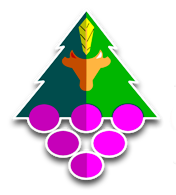
- Coat of arms Map of Galvarino commune in Araucanía Region Location in Chile
- Coordinates (town): 38°24′S 72°47′W
- Country: Chile
- Region: Araucanía
- Province: Cautín
- Named for: Galvarino

Government
  - Type: Municipality
  - Alcalde: Marcos E. Hernández Rojas (DC)

Area
  - Total: 568.2 km^{2} (219.4 sq mi)
- Elevation: 103 m (338 ft)

Population (2016 (INE))
  - Total: 12,469
  - Density: 21.94/km^{2} (56.84/sq mi)
  - Urban: 3,539
  - Rural: 9,539

Sex
  - Men: 6,586
  - Women: 6,492
- Time zone: UTC-3 (CLT)
- Area code: +56 45 251
- Climate: Csb
- Website: Municipality of Galvarino

Galvarino is a Chilean town and commune (Spanish: comuna), part of Cautín Province, in the Araucanía Region.

The town, named for the Mapuche warrior Galvarino, was founded on April 22, 1882 within the frame of the occupation of Araucanía by general Gregorio Urrutia, next to river Quillem as a fort of 2,500 m^{2} (26,910 sq ft). Its population come eminently from original Mapuche indigenous people. The area was colonized fundamentally by Swiss colonizers. The main economic activity is forestal activity, shown as great amount of the territory dedicated to production of forestal trees, like eucalyptus and pines.

== Demographics ==
Historical population
Year	Pop.	±% p.a.
1885	2,374	—
1895	8,968	+14.21%
1907	11,175	+1.85%
1920	11,109	−0.05%
1930	8,064	−3.15%
1940	8,773	+0.85%
1952	9,013	+0.23%
1970	12,096	+1.65%
1982	13,263	+0.77%
1992	14,076	+0.60%
2002	12,596	−1.10%
2017	11,996	−0.32%
2024	12,710	+0.83%
Source: "Censo de Población y Vivienda". National Statistics Institute.

According to the 2002 census of the National Statistics Institute, Galvarino spans an area of 568.2 km^{2} (219 sq mi) and has 12,596 inhabitants (6,500 men and 6,096 women). Of these, 3,539 (28.1%) lived in urban areas and 9,057 (71.9%) in rural areas. The population fell by 10.5% (1480 persons) between the 1992 and 2002 censuses.

== Administration ==
As a commune, Galvarino is a third-level administrative division of Chile administered by a municipal council, headed by an alcalde who is directly elected every four years. The 2016-2020 alcalde is Marcos Hernandez Rojas (PDC).

Within the electoral divisions of Chile, Galvarino is represented in the Chamber of Deputies by Diego Paulsen (RN) and Fuad Chahín (PDC) as part of the 49th electoral district, together with Victoria, Curacautín, Lonquimay, Melipeuco, Vilcún, Lautaro and Perquenco. The commune is represented in the Senate by Alberto Espina Otero (RN) and Jaime Quintana Leal (PPD) as part of the 14th senatorial constituency (Araucanía-North).
