= Javiera Paillán =

Chilean footballer

Personal information
- Full name: Javiera Ignacia Paillán Pineda
- Date of birth: 27 December 2000 (age 25)
- Place of birth: Toltén, Chile
- Position: Midfielder

Team information
- Current team: Palestino
- Number: 24

Youth career
- 2013–2017: Deportes Temuco

Senior career*
Years	Team	Apps	(Gls)
2017–2023	Deportes Temuco		
2024–	Palestino	28+	(4+)

International career^{‡}
2015–2016	Chile U17		
2024–	Chile	1	(0)
- * Club domestic league appearances and goals ‡ National team caps and goals as of 29 July 2024

Javiera Ignacia Paillán Pineda (born 27 December 2000) is a Chilean footballer who plays as a midfielder for Palestino and the Chile national team.

== Club career ==
Born in Toltén, Chile, Paillán is a product of Deportes Temuco. She spent ten years with them until 2023, becoming the team captain.

In 2024, Paillán switched to Palestino. In December 2025, she renewed with them.

== International career ==
At under-17 level, Paillán was called up to the Chile national team alongside her teammate Ámbar Riquelme in October 2015. The next year, she represented them in the South American Championship.

In 2019, she was a member of Chile at under-20 in the preparations for the 2020 South American Championship.

At senior level, she received her first call up for the friendly matches against Guatemala in May and June 2024. She made her debut in the second match, a 1–6 win.

== Personal life ==
Paillán is of Mapuche descent and was honored by the Ministry of Sports of Chile and the National Corporation for Indigenous Development (CONADI) in March 2017.
