= Cautín Province =

Cautín Province Provincia de Cautín
- Province
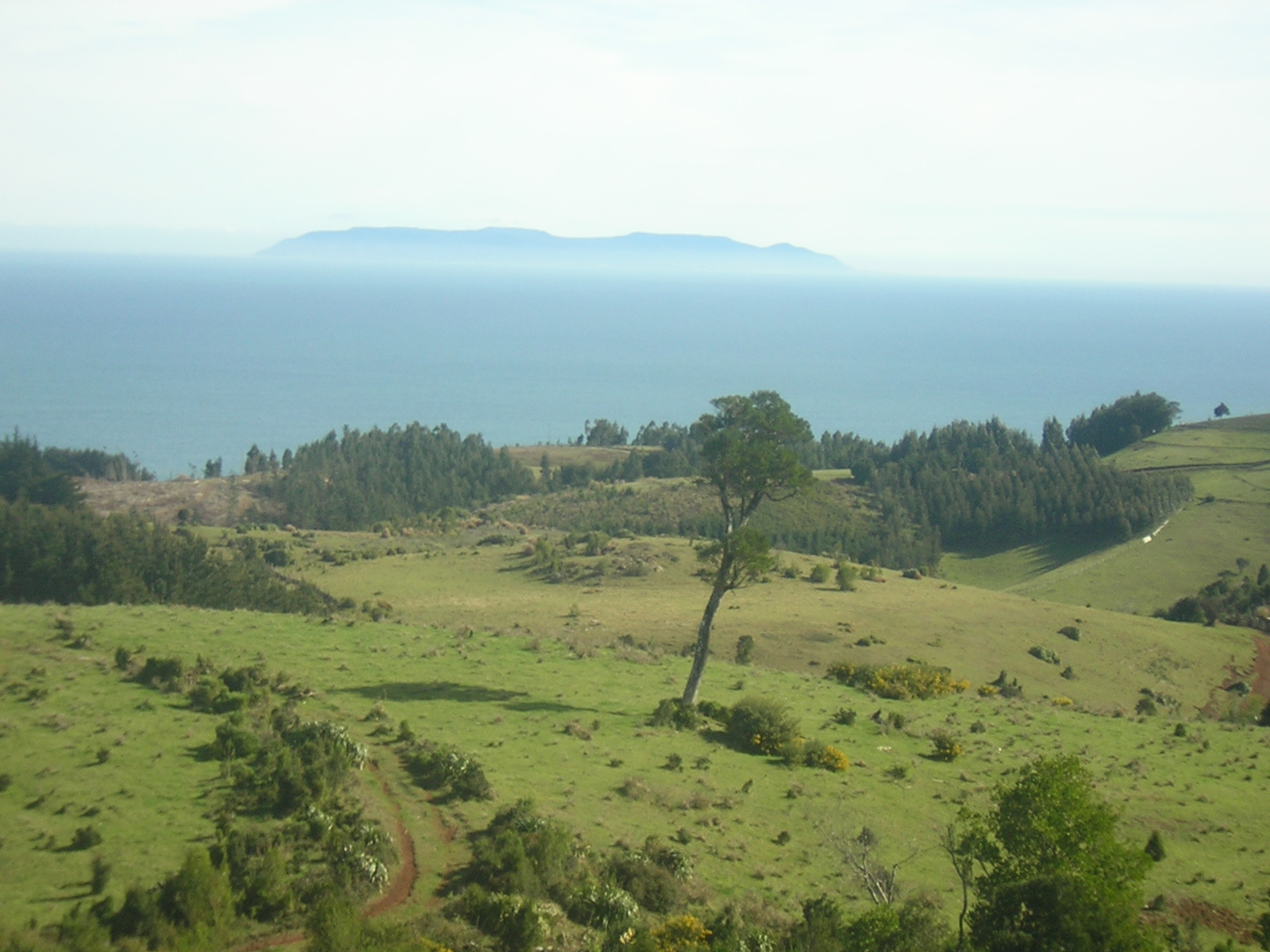
- Coastal area of Carahue

- Seal

- Location in the La Araucanía Region

- Location in Chile
- Coordinates: 39°00′S 72°30′W
- Country: Chile
- Region: La Araucanía
- Capital: Temuco
- Communes: 21 communes: Temuco; Carahue; Cholchol; Cunco; Curarrehue; Freire; Galvarino; Gorbea; Lautaro; Loncoche; Melipeuco; Nueva Imperial; Padre Las Casas; Perquenco; Pitrufquén; Pucón; Saavedra; Teodoro Schmidt; Toltén; Vilcún; Villarrica

Government
  - Type: Provincial
  - Governor: Mauricio Ojeda Rebodollo (EVOP)

Area
  - Total: 18,409.0 km^{2} (7,107.8 sq mi)

Population (2012 Census)
  - Total: 692,582
  - Density: 37.6219/km^{2} (97.4403/sq mi)
  - Urban: 449,147
  - Rural: 218,773

Sex
  - Men: 0
  - Women: 0
- Time zone: UTC-4 (CLT)
  - Summer (DST): UTC-3 (CLST)
- Area code: 56 + 45
- Website: Government of Cautín

Cautín Province (Spanish: Provincia de Cautín) is one of two provinces in the southern Chilean region of La Araucanía (IX), bounded on the north by Arauco and Malleco provinces, on the east by Argentina, on the south by Valdivia Province, and on the west by the Pacific Ocean. Its population at the 2012 census was of 692,582. The most important communes are Temuco, Villarrica, Padre Las Casas, and Nueva Imperial. Cattle, forestry, and agriculture make up most of Cautin's economy. Its climate is humid, rainy in winter, and generally warm in summer.

== History ==
Cautin province once formed part of the territory occupied by the Araucanian natives, and its present political existence dates from 1887. Cautín Province was the last area to be taken by Chile during the occupation of the Araucanía.

In the late 19th century, the Chilean government endorsed a large-scale immigration and settlement program for the area, often by endorsing land allotment advertisement to German settlers from Germany, Austria, and Switzerland, from where most of the new arrivals came. Beginning in the mid-19th century, with the German Revolutions, immigrants were often fleeing political upheaval and poor economies, seeking a new place to live. (Read German colonization of South Chile)

In 1903, a fleet of 88 Canarian families—400 persons—arrived in Budi Lake (and currently have more than 1,000 modern descendants) as a response to the government's call to populate the region, and signed contracts for the benefit of a private company. While many Canarians obeyed their servitude, some of those who disobeyed the provisions of repopulation tried to escape their agreements and were arrested, or the indigenous Mapuche people took pity on the plight of these individuals who were on their former lands. The Mapuche welcomed some of them, and joined their demonstrations, in the so-called "revolt of the Canarians"; many Canarians integrated into the Mapuche population, thus adding to the large mestizo population that exists in Chile.

Cautin is known for the 1971 Agrarian revolt.

== Tourism ==
The province of Cautín is known for its lakes and beaches. Perhaps best known internationally is the town of Pucón with its many recreational amenities on Villarrica Lake under the backdrop of the Villarrica Volcano. South of Villarrica on Calafquén Lake lies Licán Ray, another lakeside resort town. Saavedra is a popular beach on the Pacific coast.

== Economy ==
Cautín lies within the temperate agricultural and forest region of the south, and produces cereal crops such as wheat and oats. In Carahue, the potato cultivation has a significant position. In addition, cattle production is remarkable.

== Communes ==
The province of Cautín is divided into 21 communes (out of the 32 in the region):

- Temuco, provincial capital
- Carahue
- Cholchol
- Cunco
- Curarrehue
- Freire
- Galvarino
- Gorbea
- Lautaro
- Loncoche
- Melipeuco
- Nueva Imperial
- Padre Las Casas
- Perquenco
- Pitrufquén
- Pucón
- Saavedra
- Teodoro Schmidt
- Toltén
- Vilcún
- Villarrica

== Geography and demography ==
According to the 2002 census by the National Statistics Institute (INE), the province spans an area of 18,409 km^{2} (7,108 sq mi) and had a population of 667,920 inhabitants (0 men and 0 women), giving it a population density of 36.3/km^{2} (94/sq mi). It is the third most populated province in the country after Santiago and Concepción. Of these, 449,147 (67.2%) lived in urban areas and 218,773 (32.8%) in rural areas. Between the 1992 and 2002 censuses, the population grew by 15.5% (89,715 persons).
