= Quiñolef =

Mapuche cacique

Quiñolef was a Mapuche cacique from Villarrica, southern Chile, written before “Villa Rica”. He was the founder of the Lef family, which was the Mapuche nobility. In Mapuche, Quiñe means one and Lef means crown. The caudillos Calalef, Pallalef, Huenchulef, and Epulef came from this same line.
