= Pitrufquén =

- City and Commune
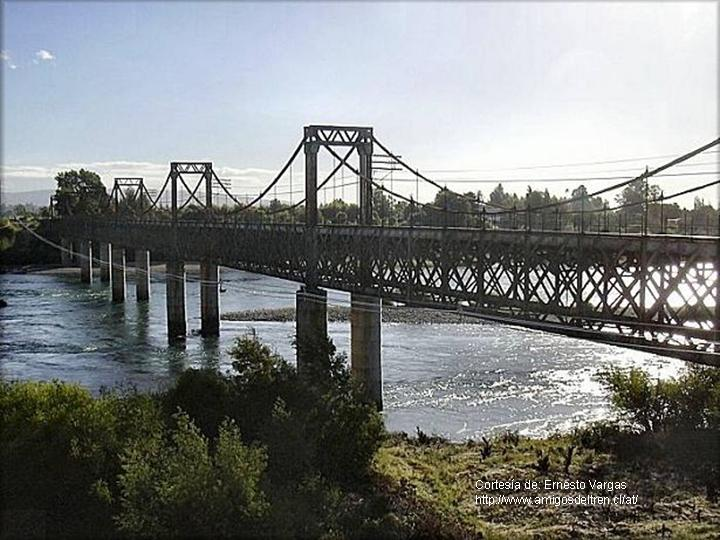

- Coat of arms Map of Pitrufquén commune in the Araucanía Region Location in Chile
- Coordinates (city): 38°59′S 72°39′W
- Country: Chile
- Region: Araucanía
- Province: Cautín

Government
  - Type: Municipality
  - Alcalde: Jorge Jaramillo Hott (PPD)

Area
  - Total: 580.7 km^{2} (224.2 sq mi)
- Elevation: 74 m (243 ft)

Population (2012 Census)
  - Total: 21,981
  - Density: 37.85/km^{2} (98.04/sq mi)
  - Urban: 13,420
  - Rural: 8,568

Sex
  - Men: 10,902
  - Women: 11,086
- Time zone: UTC−4 (CLT)
  - Summer (DST): UTC−3 (CLST)
- Area code: country 56 + city 45
- Website: Municipality of Pitrufquén

Pitrufquén (Spanish pronunciation: [pitɾufˈken]) is a Chilean city and commune in Cautín Province, Araucanía Region. The city is located 30 km south of Temuco and lies immediately south of the Toltén River, along Chile Highway 5.

== History ==
Pitrufquén was initially founded as Lisperguer, name that honors the creator of the plane of the urban area, the French engineer Lisperguer.

== Demographics ==
Historical population
Year	Pop.	±% p.a.
1875	1,290	—
1885	6,071	+16.75%
1895	2,376	−8.95%
1907	10,074	+12.79%
1920	11,284	+0.88%
1930	14,656	+2.65%
1940	17,319	+1.68%
1952	15,557	−0.89%
1970	18,935	+1.10%
1982	19,919	+0.42%
1992	20,026	+0.05%
2002	21,988	+0.94%
2017	24,837	+0.82%
2024	27,041	+1.22%
Source: "Censo de Población y Vivienda". National Statistics Institute.

According to the 2002 census of the National Statistics Institute, Pitrufquén spans an area of 580.7 km^{2} (224 sq mi) and has 21,988 inhabitants (10,902 men and 11,086 women). Of these, 13,420 (61%) lived in urban areas and 8,568 (39%) in rural areas.

Pitrufquén's population is characterized as varied because its members have different culture backgrounds, highlighting the historical legacy Spanish and immigrants principally from: France, Italy, Germany, The Netherlands, Austria, Belgium, Switzerland and Hungary. Currently, the largest foreign colony is in "Faja Maisan" composed mostly of descendants of Germans, Dutchmen and Swiss, whose ancestors arrived in La Araucanía between 1905 and 1912.

Since 1898, Pitrufquén begins its development under the impetus of its people and its agricultural potential. Besides immigrants mostly Dutchmen and Germans.

== Administration ==
As a commune, Pitrufquén is a third-level administrative division of Chile administered by a municipal council, headed by an alcalde who is directly elected every four years. The 2008–2012 alcalde is Humberto Catalán Candia (PS).

Within the electoral divisions of Chile, Pitrufquén is represented in the Chamber of Deputies by José Manuel Edwards (RN) and Joaquín Tuma (PDC) as part of the 51st electoral district, together with Carahue, Nueva Imperial, Saavedra, Teodoro Schmidt, Freire and Cholchol. The commune is represented in the Senate by José Garcia Ruminot (RN) and Eugenio Tuma Zedan (PPD) as part of the 15th senatorial constituency (Araucanía-South).
