= Carahue =

- City and Commune
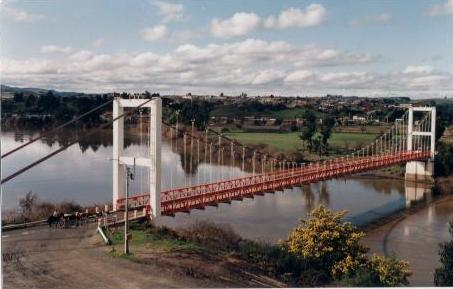
- President Eduardo Frei Montalva Bridge (a.k.a. "Puente Colgante". English: "Suspension Bridge")

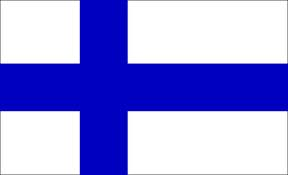
- Flag Coat of arms Map of Carahue commune in the Araucanía Region Location in Chile
- Nickname: "The three-floor city" ("La ciudad de los tres pisos")
- Coordinates: 38°42′32″S 73°09′53″W
- Country: Chile
- Region: Araucanía
- Province: Cautín
- Re-founded: 22 February 1882
- Founder: Gregorio Urrutia Venegas

Government
  - Type: Municipality
  - Alcalde: Héctor Alejandro Sáez Veliz (UDI)

Area
  - Total: 1,340.5 km^{2} (517.6 sq mi)
- Elevation: 3 m (9.8 ft)

Population (2012 Census)
  - Total: 24,377
  - Density: 18.185/km^{2} (47.099/sq mi)
  - Urban: 11,596
  - Rural: 14,100

Sex
  - Men: 13,017
  - Women: 12,679
- Time zone: UTC−4 (CLT)
  - Summer (DST): UTC−3 (CLST)
- Postal code: 5010000
- Area code: 56 + 45
- Climate: Csb
- Website: www.carahue.cl

Carahue (Spanish pronunciation: [kaˈɾawe]) is a city and commune in southern Chile. It is located 56 km west of Temuco, on the northern bank of the Imperial River.

The city was founded as La Imperial on April 16, 1552 by Pedro de Valdivia. La Imperial or Antigua [Old] Imperial, was abandoned and destroyed as a result of the Mapuche Uprising of 1598 during the War of Arauco in 1600, and refounded in 1882, in course of Occupation of the Araucanía, under the name Carahue.

The commune of Carahue hosts the southernmost natural forests of Araucaria araucana in the Chilean Coast Range.

== Demographics ==
Historical population
Year	Pop.	±% p.a.
1895	3,807	—
1907	4,810	+1.97%
1920	6,879	+2.79%
1930	13,953	+7.33%
1940	18,242	+2.72%
1952	16,280	−0.94%
1970	22,774	+1.88%
1982	24,564	+0.63%
1992	25,500	+0.37%
2002	25,696	+0.08%
2017	24,533	−0.31%
2024	24,957	+0.25%
Source: "Censo de Población y Vivienda". National Statistics Institute.

According to the 2002 census of the National Statistics Institute, Carahue spans an area of 1,340.5 km^{2} (518 sq mi) and has 25,696 inhabitants (13,017 men and 12,679 women). Of these, 11,596 (45.1%) lived in urban areas and 14,100 (54.9%) in rural areas. The population grew by 0.8% (196 persons) between the 1992 and 2002 censuses.

== Administration ==
As a commune, Carahue is a third-level administrative division of Chile administered by a municipal council, headed by an alcalde who is directly elected every four years. The current alcalde is Héctor Alejandro Sáez Veliz (UDI).

Within the electoral divisions of Chile, Carahue is represented in the Chamber of Deputies by José Manuel Edwards (RN) and Joaquín Tuma (PDC) as part of the 51st electoral district, (together with Nueva Imperial, Saavedra, Teodoro Schmidt, Freire, Pitrufquén and Cholchol). The commune is represented in the Senate by José Garcia Ruminot (RN) and Eugenio Tuma Zedan (PPD) as part of the 15th senatorial constituency (Araucanía-South).
