= Ojos del Caburgua =

Waterfall in Pucón, Araucanía Region, Chile

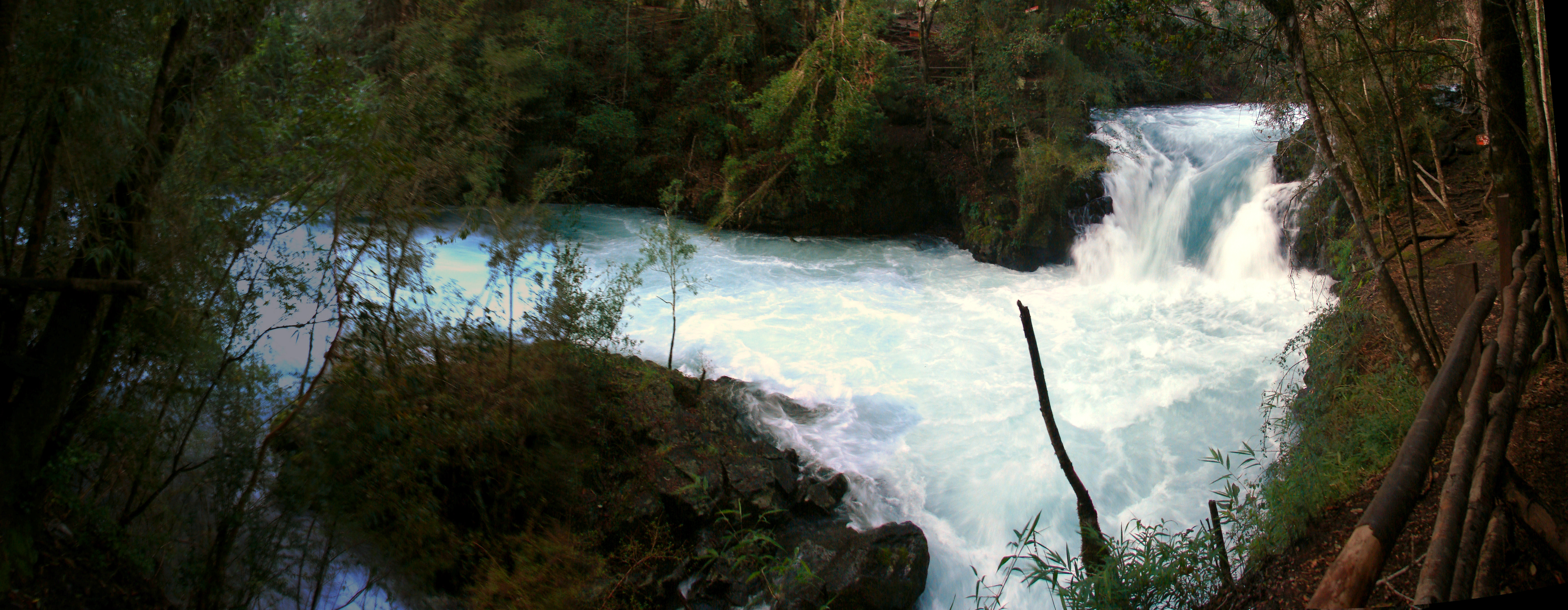
- Interactive map of Ojos del Caburgua
- Location: Caburgua, La Araucanía, Chile
- Coordinates: 39°14′49″S 71°50′34″W
- Elevation: 110 metres (360 ft)
- Number of drops: 1

Ojos del Caburgua is a waterfall located 15 kilometers east of Pucón and four kilometers south of Caburgua Lake in the region of Aracaunía in southern Chile.
