= Nueva Toltén =

Nueva Toltén Tolten
- Town
- Coat of arms

- Location in Chile
- Coordinates: 39°10′43″S 73°09′56″W
- Country: Chile
- Region: Araucanía
- Province: Cautín
- Commune: Toltén
- Municipality: Toltén
- Founded: 1866

Government
  - Mayor: Guillermo Allende Martínez (UDI)
- Elevation: 10 m (33 ft)

Population (2017)
  - Total: 9,776
- Time zone: UTC-4 (Santiago)
  - Summer (DST): UTC-3 (Santiago Verano)

Nueva Toltén is a Chilean town in Toltén commune, Cautín Province, Araucania Region. It is located near the mouth of the Toltén River that drains Villarrica Lake, and is also 40 miles (64 km) SW of Temuco. Nueva Toltén was founded after the original community, Toltén, was destroyed by the tsunami of the Great Chilean earthquake. It has 9776 inhabitants. The name originates from the Mapuche language meaning "meeting place of different waters."

== See also ==
- List of towns in Chile
