= Curarrehue =

- Town and commune
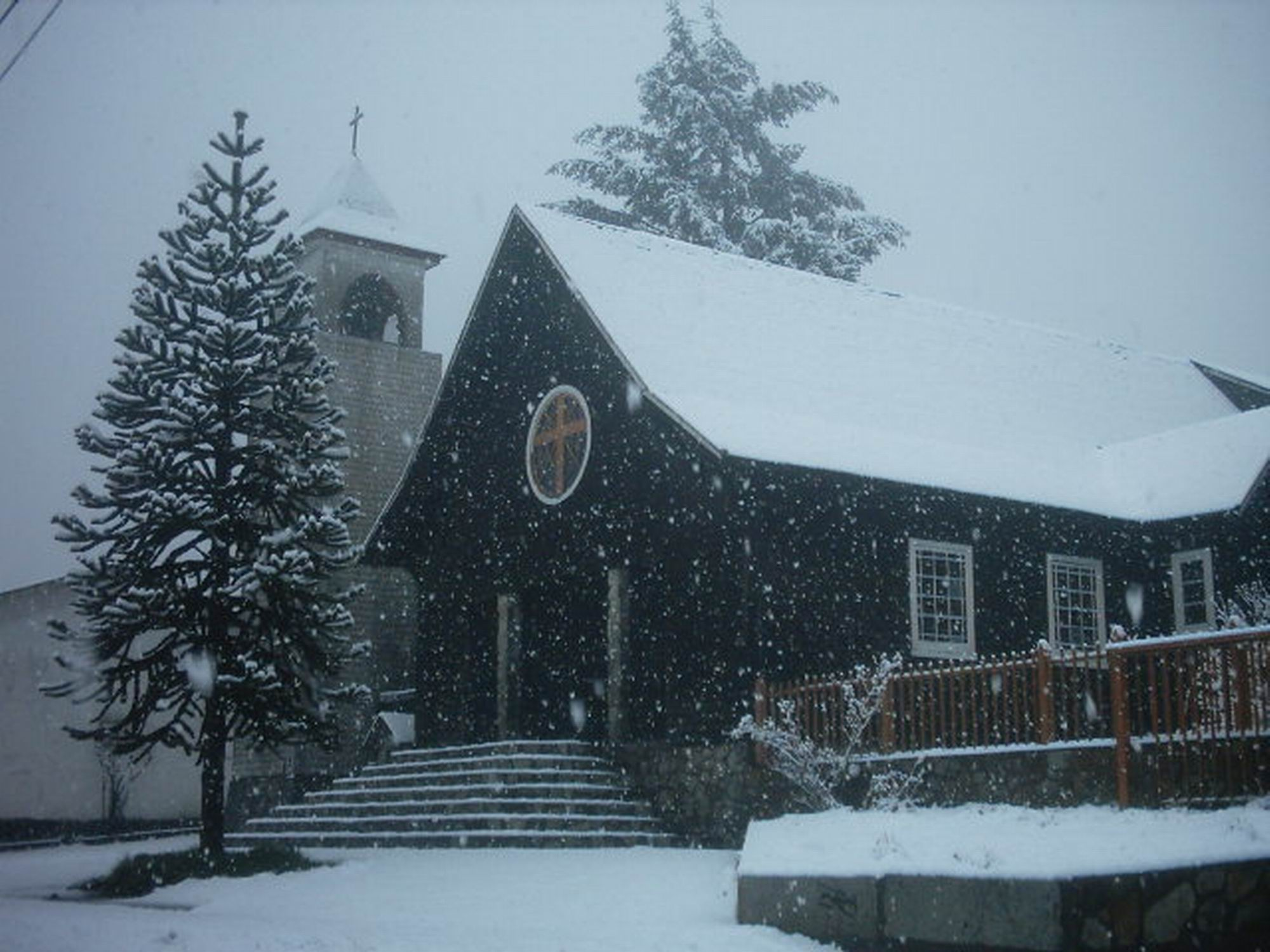
- View of Curarrehue's church a winter day

- Map of Curarrehue commune in the Araucanía Region Location in Chile
- Coordinates (town): 39°21′S 71°35′W
- Country: Chile
- Region: Araucanía
- Province: Cautín
- Founded: 1981

Government
  - Type: Municipality
  - Alcalde: Abel Painefilo Barriga (PPD)

Area
  - Total: 1,170.7 km^{2} (452.0 sq mi)
- Elevation: 406 m (1,332 ft)

Population (2012 census)
  - Total: 6,624
  - Density: 5.658/km^{2} (14.65/sq mi)
  - Urban: 1,862
  - Rural: 4,922

Sex
  - Men: 3,586
  - Women: 3,198
- Area code: (+56) 45
- Website: www.curarrehue.cl

Curarrehue (Spanish pronunciation: [kuɾaˈrewe]) is a town and commune in Cautín Province of Araucanía Region, Chile. The origin of Curarrehue dates back to the occupation of Araucanía and the Conquest of the Desert by the Chilean and Argentine army respectively in the 1870s and 1880s when Mapuches were pushed by the Argentine Army through Mamuil Malal Pass into the valley of Curarrehue where they settled.

The town of Curarrehue aside, the second largest settlement in the commune is the village of Catripulli with 424 inhabitants as of 2017.

Geologically the town of Curarrehue is placed on the Reigolil-Pirihueico Fault.

== Demographics ==
Historical population
Year	Pop.	±% p.a.
1970	6,464	—
1982	6,070	−0.52%
1992	5,978	−0.15%
2002	6,784	+1.27%
2017	7,489	+0.66%
2024	7,733	+0.46%
Source: "Censo de Población y Vivienda". National Statistics Institute.

According to the 2002 census of the National Statistics Institute, Curarrehue spans an area of 1,170.7 km^{2} (452 sq mi) and has 6,784 inhabitants (3,586 men and 3,198 women). Of these, 1,862 (27.4%) lived in urban areas and 4,922 (72.6%) in rural areas. The population grew by 13.5% (806 persons) between the 1992 and 2002 censuses.

== Administration ==
As a commune, Curarrehue is a third-level administrative division of Chile administered by a municipal council, headed by an alcalde who is directly elected every four years. The 2008-2012 alcalde is Héctor Carrasco Ruiz (RN).

Within the electoral divisions of Chile, Curarrehue is represented in the Chamber of Deputies by René Manuel García (RN) and Fernando Meza (PRSD) as part of the 52nd electoral district, together with Cunco, Pucón, Villarrica, Loncoche, Gorbea and Toltén. The commune is represented in the Senate by José Garcia Ruminot (RN) and Eugenio Tuma Zedan (PPD) as part of the 15th senatorial constituency (Araucanía-South).

== Geography ==
=== Climate ===
Curarrehue has a cool and humid oceanic climate (with a cool-summer Mediterranean tendency), with an average annual precipitation of 2,134 millimetres (84.0 in). Summers have mild days and cool nights. Winters are chilly and wetter, with snowfalls. This climate is described by the Köppen climate classification as Cfb.

Climate data for Curarrehue
Month	Jan	Feb	Mar	Apr	May	Jun	Jul	Aug	Sep	Oct	Nov	Dec	Year
Mean daily maximum °C (°F)	20.6 (69.1)	20.9 (69.6)	18.0 (64.4)	13.4 (56.1)	9.6 (49.3)	5.5 (41.9)	4.5 (40.1)	5.4 (41.7)	8.1 (46.6)	11.3 (52.3)	14.8 (58.6)	17.8 (64.0)	12.5 (54.5)
Daily mean °C (°F)	14.8 (58.6)	14.9 (58.8)	12.3 (54.1)	8.6 (47.5)	5.5 (41.9)	2.4 (36.3)	1.3 (34.3)	2.0 (35.6)	3.6 (38.5)	6.3 (43.3)	9.5 (49.1)	12.3 (54.1)	7.8 (46.0)
Mean daily minimum °C (°F)	9.3 (48.7)	9.6 (49.3)	7.6 (45.7)	4.7 (40.5)	2.5 (36.5)	0.1 (32.2)	−1.1 (30.0)	−0.6 (30.9)	0.1 (32.2)	2.0 (35.6)	4.7 (40.5)	7.2 (45.0)	3.8 (38.9)
Average precipitation mm (inches)	61 (2.4)	59 (2.3)	81 (3.2)	153 (6.0)	249 (9.8)	380 (15.0)	311 (12.2)	292 (11.5)	176 (6.9)	154 (6.1)	117 (4.6)	101 (4.0)	2,134 (84)
Source: Climate-data.org
