= Saavedra, Chile =

Saavedra
- Town and Commune
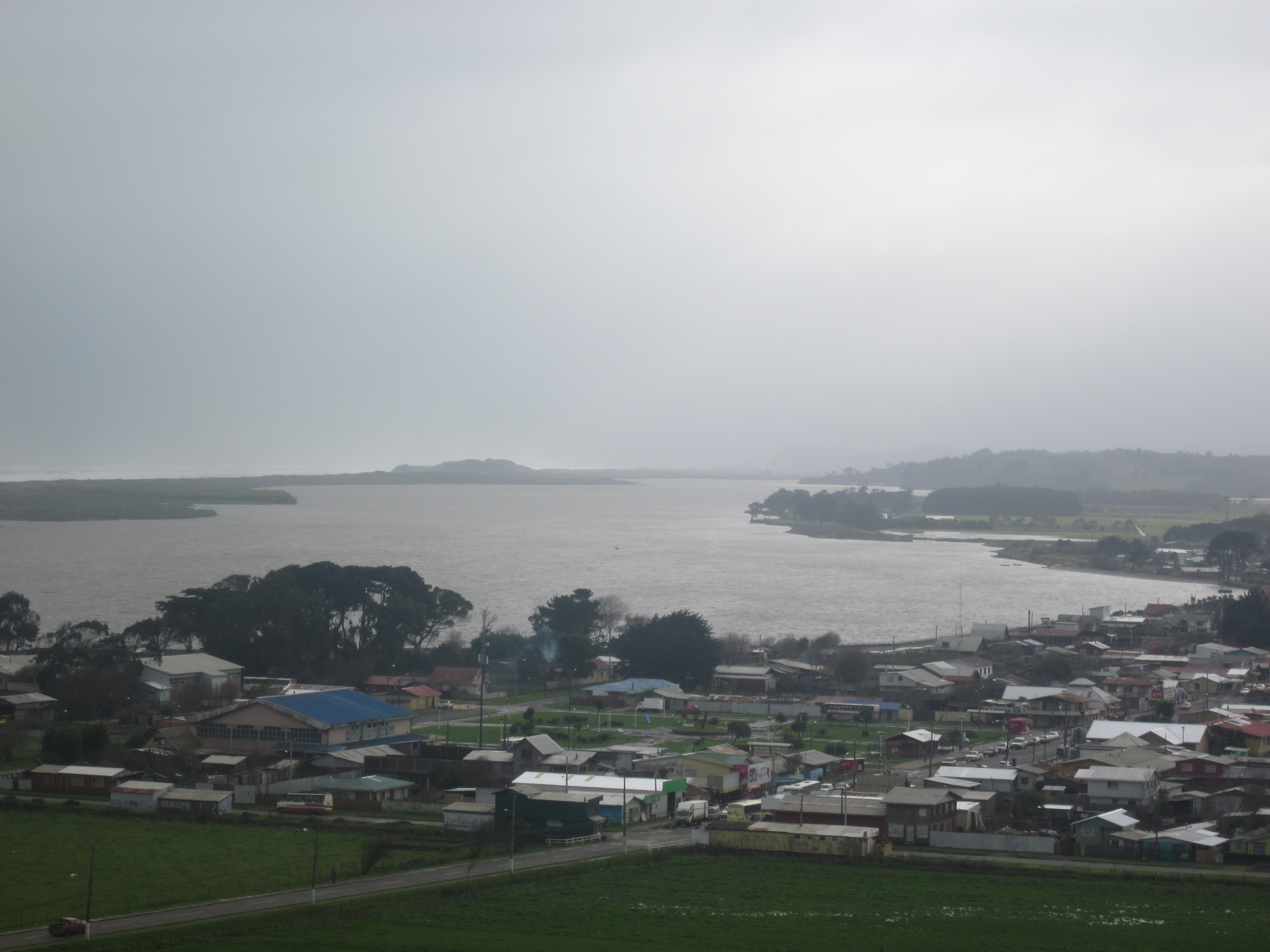
- View of Puerto Saavedra and its seawater lagoon

- Coat of arms Map of Saavedra commune in Araucanía Region Location in Chile
- Coordinates (town): 38°46′59″S 73°24′00″W
- Country: Chile
- Region: Araucanía
- Province: Cautín
- Founded: 5 December 1895
- Founded as: Bajo Imperial

Government
  - Type: Municipality
  - Alcalde: Ricardo Tripainao Calfulaf (PPD)

Area
  - Total: 400.8 km^{2} (154.7 sq mi)
- Elevation: 10 m (33 ft)

Population (2012 Census)
  - Total: 11,384
  - Density: 28.40/km^{2} (73.56/sq mi)
  - Urban: 2,679
  - Rural: 11,355

Sex
  - Men: 7,259
  - Women: 6,775
- Time zone: UTC-4 (CLT)
  - Summer (DST): UTC-3 (CLST)
- Area code: country 56 + city 45
- Website: www.saavedra.cl

Saavedra (Spanish pronunciation: [saaˈβeðɾa]) is a commune of Chile in Cautín Province, Araucanía Region. The principal community and administrative centre of the commune is the town of Puerto Saavedra. The commune is named after the Chilean soldier General Cornelio Saavedra Rodríguez who was placed in charge of the occupation of the Araucanía in 1860. It has the highest percentage—though not the largest number—of Mapuche people in the region (64%, 2002 census). It is also the location for the 1991 movie "La Frontera".

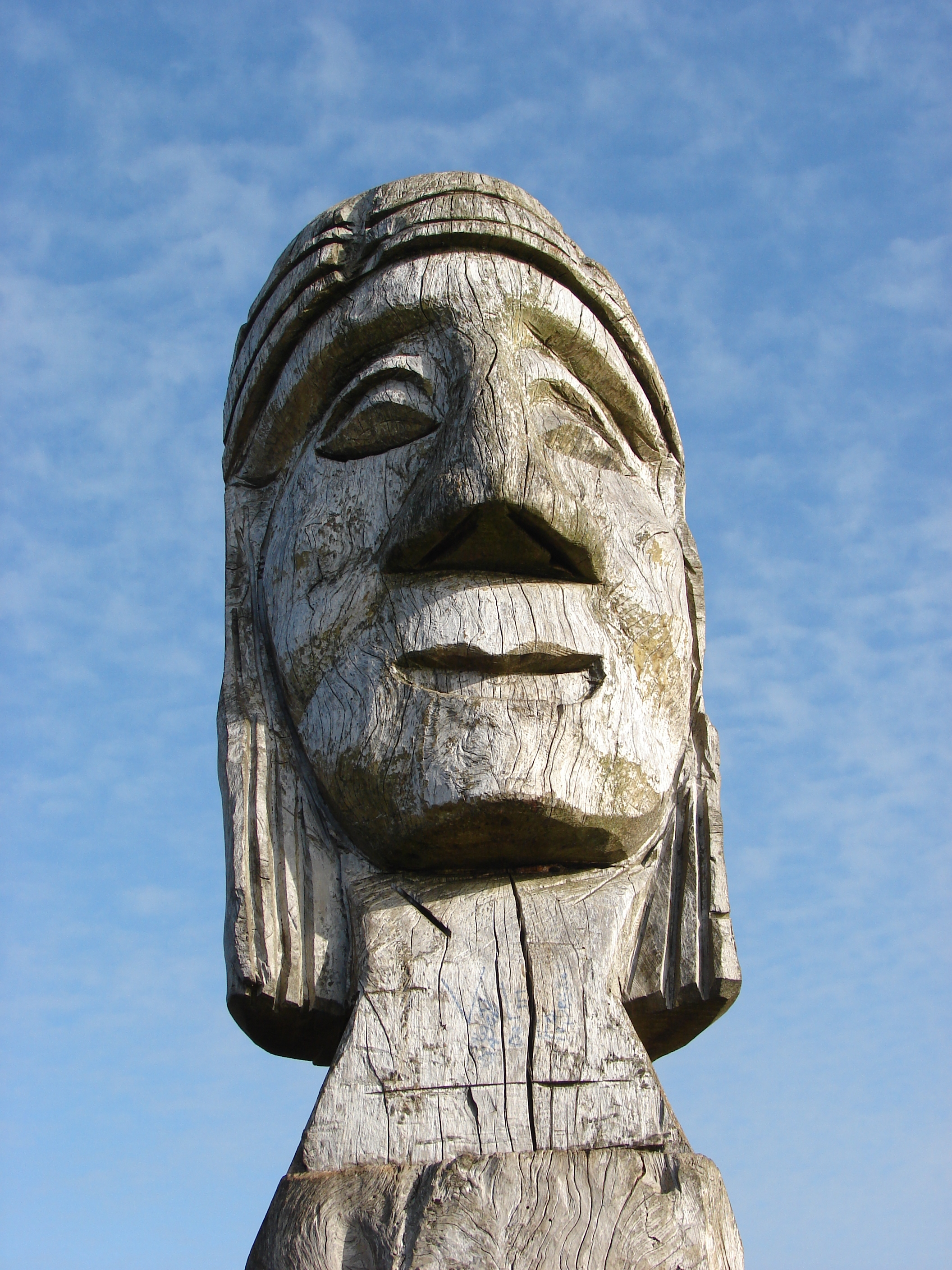
Rehue at the Cerro Maule lookout point ("mirador") near Puerto Saavedra, Chile Feb 16, 2009

== Demographics ==
Historical population
Year	Pop.	±% p.a.
1885	523	—
1895	11,479	+36.19%
1907	16,991	+3.32%
1920	22,876	+2.31%
1930	27,283	+1.78%
1940	30,981	+1.28%
1952	30,935	−0.01%
1970	12,387	−4.96%
1982	13,890	+0.96%
1992	14,432	+0.38%
2002	14,034	−0.28%
2017	12,450	−0.80%
2024	12,877	+0.48%
Source: "Censo de Población y Vivienda". National Statistics Institute.

According to the 2002 census of the National Statistics Institute, Saavedra spans an area of 400.8 km^{2} (155 sq mi) and has 14,034 inhabitants (7,259 men and 6,775 women). Of these, 2,679 (19.1%) lived in urban areas and 11,355 (80.9%) in rural areas. The population fell by 2.8% (398 persons) between the 1992 and 2002 censuses.

== Administration ==
As a commune, Saavedra is a third-level administrative division of Chile administered by a municipal council, headed by an alcalde who is directly elected every four years. The 2008-2012 alcalde is Ricardo Tripainao Calfulaf (PPD).

Within the electoral divisions of Chile, Saavedra is represented in the Chamber of Deputies by José Manuel Edwards (RN) and Joaquín Tuma (PDC) as part of the 51st electoral district, together with Carahue, Nueva Imperial, Teodoro Schmidt, Freire, Pitrufquén and Cholchol. The commune is represented in the Senate by José Garcia Ruminot (RN) and Eugenio Tuma Zedan (PPD) as part of the 15th senatorial constituency (Araucanía-South).

== Climate ==
Climate data for Puerto Dominguez
Month	Jan	Feb	Mar	Apr	May	Jun	Jul	Aug	Sep	Oct	Nov	Dec	Year
Mean daily maximum °C (°F)	20.2 (68.4)	20.4 (68.7)	19.0 (66.2)	17.1 (62.8)	14.6 (58.3)	13.1 (55.6)	12.6 (54.7)	13.0 (55.4)	14.2 (57.6)	15.6 (60.1)	16.9 (62.4)	18.7 (65.7)	16.3 (61.3)
Daily mean °C (°F)	15.0 (59.0)	14.8 (58.6)	13.4 (56.1)	11.5 (52.7)	8.8 (47.8)	8.8 (47.8)	8.5 (47.3)	8.4 (47.1)	9.5 (49.1)	11.0 (51.8)	12.5 (54.5)	14.0 (57.2)	11.4 (52.4)
Mean daily minimum °C (°F)	9.2 (48.6)	9.3 (48.7)	8.5 (47.3)	6.9 (44.4)	5.8 (42.4)	5.5 (41.9)	5.1 (41.2)	4.5 (40.1)	5.5 (41.9)	6.4 (43.5)	7.7 (45.9)	8.8 (47.8)	6.9 (44.5)
Average precipitation mm (inches)	43.9 (1.73)	39.2 (1.54)	75.6 (2.98)	104.7 (4.12)	255.0 (10.04)	263.5 (10.37)	257.9 (10.15)	193.6 (7.62)	135.4 (5.33)	79.7 (3.14)	78.5 (3.09)	53.7 (2.11)	1,580.7 (62.22)
Average relative humidity (%)	80	81	82	86	87	87	86	85	84	82	80	80	83
Source: Bioclimatografia de Chile
