= Toltén =

- Commune
- Map of Toltén commune in Araucanía Region Location in Chile
- Coordinates (commune): 39°10′43″S 73°09′56″W
- Country: Chile
- Region: Araucanía
- Province: Cautín
- Founded: 1866

Government
  - Type: Municipality
  - Alcalde: Rafael García Ferlice (UDI)

Area
  - Total: 860.4 km^{2} (332.2 sq mi)
- Elevation: 10 m (33 ft)

Population (2012 Census)
  - Total: 10,291
  - Density: 11.96/km^{2} (30.98/sq mi)
  - Urban: 4,123
  - Rural: 7,093

Sex
  - Men: 5,827
  - Women: 5,389
- Time zone: UTC−04:00 (CLT)
  - Summer (DST): UTC−03:00 (CLST)
- Area code: 56 + 45
- Website: www.tolten.cl

Toltén is a Chilean commune located at the lower flows Toltén River at the southern coast of Cautín Province which is part of Araucanía Region. The commune is administered by the municipality Nueva Toltén, the main harbour and town within the commune.

== Demographics ==
Historical population
Year	Pop.	±% p.a.
1875	2,610	—
1885	4,973	+6.66%
1895	914	−15.58%
1907	2,590	+9.07%
1920	2,884	+0.83%
1930	6,046	+7.68%
1940	9,064	+4.13%
1952	15,186	+4.39%
1970	11,546	−1.51%
1982	12,178	+0.45%
1992	12,061	−0.10%
2002	11,216	−0.72%
2017	9,722	−0.95%
2024	10,041	+0.46%
Source: "Censo de Población y Vivienda". National Statistics Institute.

According to the 2002 census of the National Statistics Institute, Toltén spans an area of 860.4 km^{2} (332 sq mi) and has 11,216 inhabitants (5,827 men and 5,389 women). Of these, 4,123 (36.8%) lived in urban areas and 7,093 (63.2%) in rural areas. The population fell by 7% (845 persons) between the 1992 and 2002 censuses.

The main settlements are Nueva Toltén, Queule, Villa Los Boldos and Los Pinos.

== Administration ==
As a commune, Toltén is a third-level administrative division of Chile administered by a municipal council, headed by an alcalde who is directly elected every four years. The 2008–2012 alcalde is Rafael García Ferlice (UDI).

Within the electoral divisions of Chile, Toltén is represented in the Chamber of Deputies by René Manuel García (RN) and Fernando Meza (PRSD) as part of the 52nd electoral district, together with Cunco, Pucón, Curarrehue, Villarrica, Loncoche and Gorbea. The commune is represented in the Senate by José Garcia Ruminot (RN) and Eugenio Tuma Zedan (PPD) as part of the 15th senatorial constituency (Araucanía-South).
