= Loncoche =

- City and Commune
- Map of Loncoche commune in Araucanía Region Location in Chile
- Coordinates (city): 39°22′0″S 72°38′0″W
- Country: Chile
- Region: Araucanía
- Province: Cautín
- Founded as: Villa Carrera

Government
  - Type: Municipality
  - Alcalde: Ricardo Peña Riquelme (RN)

Area
  - Total: 976.8 km^{2} (377.1 sq mi)
- Elevation: 98 m (322 ft)

Population (2012 Census)
  - Total: 21,458
  - Density: 21.97/km^{2} (56.90/sq mi)
  - Urban: 15,223
  - Rural: 7,814

Sex
  - Men: 11,499
  - Women: 11,538
- Time zone: UTC−4 (CLT)
  - Summer (DST): UTC−3 (CLST)
- Area code: country 56 + city 45
- Website: Municipality of Loncoche

Loncoche (Mapudungun for "head of an important person") is a city and commune in Cautín Province in the Araucanía Region, southern Chile. It is located near the border to Los Ríos Region and the city of Lanco.

Loncoche is a major centre for milk production. Loncoleche is the main milk and dairy product producer in the zone.

Pablo Neruda wrote a poem called "Aromos rubios en los campos de Loncoche".

== Demographics ==
Historical population
Year	Pop.	±% p.a.
1875	509	—
1885	729	+3.66%
1895	2,419	+12.74%
1907	9,768	+12.33%
1920	22,301	+6.56%
1930	20,447	−0.86%
1940	18,223	−1.14%
1952	16,489	−0.83%
1970	18,932	+0.77%
1982	23,173	+1.70%
1992	23,643	+0.20%
2002	23,037	−0.26%
2017	23,612	+0.16%
2024	25,158	+0.91%
Source: "Censo de Población y Vivienda". National Statistics Institute.

According to the 2002 census of the National Statistics Institute, Loncoche spans an area of 976.8 km^{2} (377 sq mi) and has 23,037 inhabitants (11,499 men and 11,538 women). Of these, 15,223 (66.1%) lived in urban areas and 7,814 (33.9%) in rural areas. The population fell by 2.6% (606 persons) between the 1992 and 2002 censuses.

== Administration ==
As a commune, Loncoche is a third-level administrative division of Chile administered by a municipal council, headed by an alcalde who is directly elected every four years. The 2008-2012 alcalde is Ricardo Peña Riquelme (RN).

Within the electoral divisions of Chile, Loncoche is represented in the Chamber of Deputies by René Manuel García (RN) and Fernando Meza (PRSD) as part of the 52nd electoral district, together with Cunco, Pucón, Curarrehue, Villarrica, Gorbea and Toltén. The commune is represented in the Senate by José Garcia Ruminot (RN) and Eugenio Tuma Zedan (PPD) as part of the 15th senatorial constituency (Araucanía-South). There are two high schools - Liceo Bicentenario P. Alberto Hurtado Cruchaga and Santa Cruz.
