= Villarrica, Chile =

Villarrica
- City and Commune
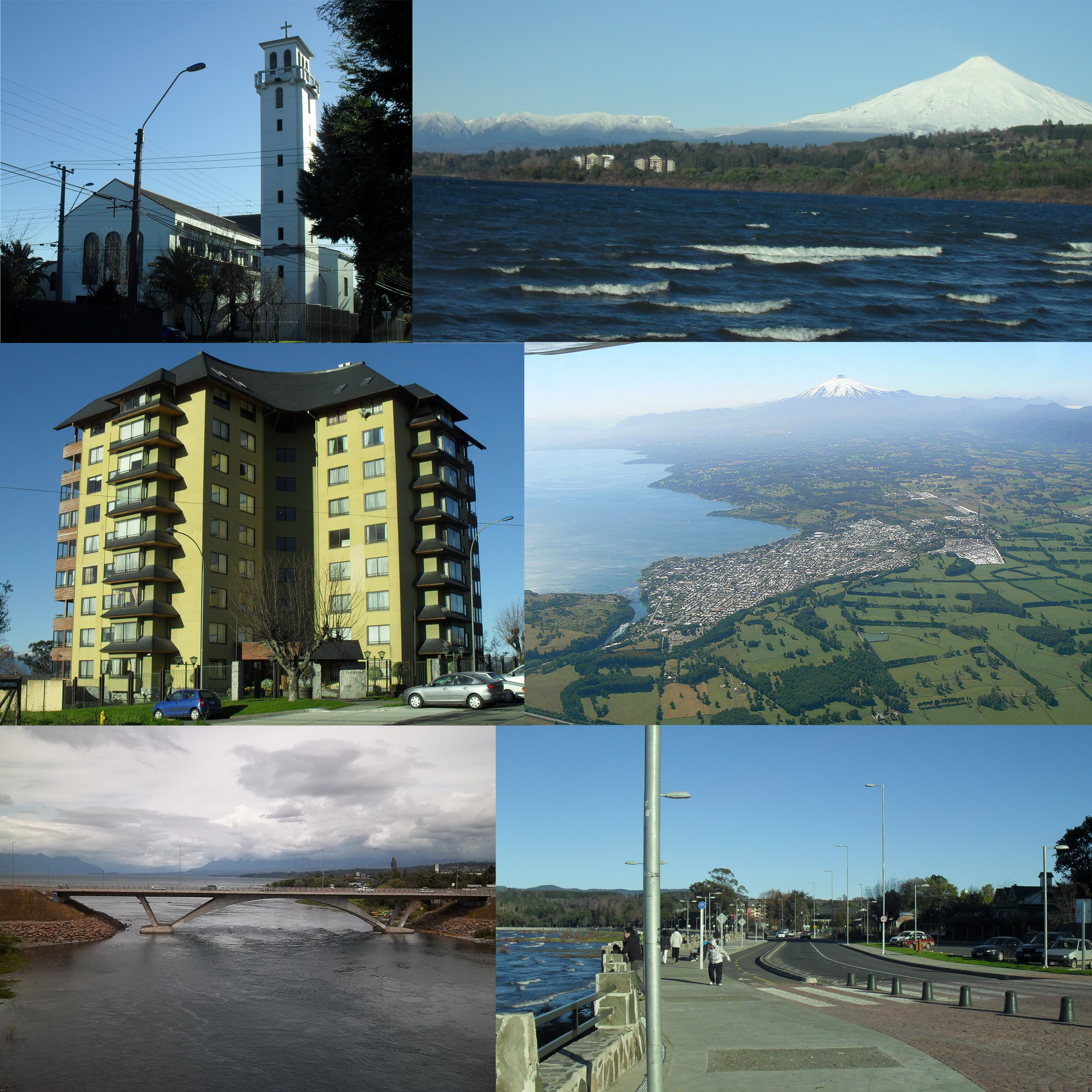

- Coat of arms Map of the Villarrica commune in Araucanía Region Location in Chile
- Coordinates (city): 39°16′S 72°13′W
- Country: Chile
- Region: Araucanía
- Province: Cautín
- Founded: 1552
- Founded as: Santa María de Magdalena de Villa Rica

Government
  - Type: Municipality
  - Alcalde: Pablo Astete Mermoud (RN)

Area
  - Total: 1,291.1 km^{2} (498.5 sq mi)
- Elevation: 227 m (745 ft)

Population (2012 Census)
  - Total: 49,184
  - Density: 38.095/km^{2} (98.665/sq mi)
  - Urban: 30,859
  - Rural: 14,672
- Demonym: Villarrican

Sex
  - Men: 22,694
  - Women: 22,837
- Time zone: UTC−4 (CLT)
  - Summer (DST): UTC−3 (CLST)
- postal code: 493 0000 (assigned but not in use as of 2006)
- Area code: country + city = 56 + 45
- Website: www.villarrica.org (in Spanish)
- postal code precedes City name, e.g. 493 0000 Villarrica

Villarrica is a city and commune in southern Chile located on the western shore of Villarrica Lake in the Province of Cautín, Araucanía Region 746 km (464 mi) south of Santiago and close to the Villarrica Volcano ski center to the south east. Residents of Villarrica are known as Villarricences.

Tourism, grain and dairy farming, and forestry are the main economic activities of the community. The climate is mild and humid with the greatest rainfall experienced between May and July (autumn and winter). The dry season is between December and February (Summer).

Other lakes found nearby include Calafquén, Caburgua, Huilipilún and Colico. In the summer water sports and sunbathing are popular activities in the warm temperatures experienced at the low altitudes ranging from 200 to 500m above sea level.

Fishing and rafting are popular activities in the various rivers in the area, which include the Toltén, Voipir, Trancura, Llancahue and Lincura. Popular waterfalls include León, La China, Palguín, Ojos del Caburga. Thanks to the numerous volcanos, hot springs with temperatures ranging from 48 °C to 90 °C, are found nearby. Included are Coñaripe (48 °C), San Luis (43 °C), Huife (49 °C), Palguín (57 °C) and Liquiñe (87 °C).

Villarrica National Park is 36 km (22 mi) away, and was created to preserve the natural beauty of the volcano. The area is noted for using wood as its principal building material.

== History ==
Villarrica was founded as Santa María Magdalena de la Villa Rica (Saint Mary Magdalene of the Rich Town) in 1552 by Jerónimo de Alderete. The site of foundation was likely near that of present-day Pucón. During its early years Villarrica was an important gold and silver mining centre. However mining activity declined likely as consequence of burial of placer deposits beneath lahars of Villarrica Volcano. This burial would have prompted settlers to move the city westward to its modern site, a place less prone to volcanic hazards. Gold mined in Villarrica was known, together with gold from Osorno and other localities, as "gold from Valdivia" (Spanish: oro de Valdivia) as the mint where gold was sent was in that city.

Abandoned after his death in 1554, it was refounded five years later by García Hurtado de Mendoza. It grew into a small city, despite suffering destruction by a great earthquake on December 16, 1575. It had opened communications with Buenos Aires in its last years.

Following the Battle of Curalaba in the Arauco War, the last Spanish city to the south of the Bío Bío River was destroyed after a three-year-long siege, surrendering on February 7, 1603. Before its destruction it had more than 600 Spanish inhabitants, not counting its Indian servants. At its surrender only 11 men and 13 women were taken captive.

The city was refounded on the site of the old city in the 1880s during the occupation of Araucanía. The population in 2002 was 45,531. Population growth and economic development has increased, due to a global reputation as a tourist destination for nature lovers, summer recreation and winter sports enthusiasts.

After the city's refounding, the Chilean government established a land sale program to encourage settlement and invited European, esp. Swiss, German and Austrian immigrants in the last half of the 19th century to populate an area.

== Demographics ==
Historical population
Year	Pop.	±% p.a.
1895	1,887	—
1907	4,551	+7.61%
1920	7,732	+4.16%
1930	11,598	+4.14%
1940	20,842	+6.04%
1952	21,541	+0.28%
1970	27,691	+1.41%
1982	32,973	+1.47%
1992	35,867	+0.84%
2002	45,531	+2.41%
2017	55,478	+1.33%
2024	67,737	+2.89%
Source: "Censo de Población y Vivienda". National Statistics Institute.

According to the 2002 census of the National Statistics Institute, Villarrica spans an area of 1,291.1 km^{2} (498 sq mi) and has 45,531 inhabitants (22,694 men and 22,837 women). Of these, 30,859 (67.8%) lived in urban areas and 14,672 (32.2%) in rural areas. The population grew by 26.9% (9,664 persons) between the 1992 and 2002 censuses.

== Administration ==
As a commune, Villarrica is a third-level administrative division of Chile administered by a municipal council, headed by an alcalde who is directly elected every four years. The 2021 alcalde is Germán Vergara Lagos (independent).

Within the electoral divisions of Chile, Villarrica is part of the 23rd District in the Chamber of Deputies (Araucanía South). The commune is represented in the Senate as part of the Araucanía Senate Constituency.

== Notable people ==
- Quiñolef, a mapuche cacique
