= Cholchol =

- Town and Commune
- Location of the Cholchol commune in the Araucanía Region Location in Chile
- Nickname: chol chol city
- Coordinates: 38°36′S 72°50′W
- Country: Chile
- Region: Araucanía
- Province: Cautín
- Established: 22 November 1881

Government
  - Type: Municipality
  - Alcalde: Luis Huirilef Barra

Area
  - Total: 427.9 km^{2} (165.2 sq mi)
- Elevation: 22 m (72 ft)

Population (11.611 censo 2017)
  - Total: 10,382
  - Density: 24.26/km^{2} (62.84/sq mi)
  - Urban: 3,355
  - Rural: 6,710
- Time zone: UTC-4 (CLT)
  - Summer (DST): UTC-3 (CLST)
- Area code: (+56) 45
- Website: Municipality of Cholchol

Cholchol is a Chilean town and commune located in Cautín Province, Araucanía Region. The commune was created by Law 19,944 on April 22, 2004, by dividing off the northern area of the existing Nueva Imperial commune.

== Demographics ==
Historical population
Year	Pop.	±% p.a.
2002	10,065	—
2017	11,611	+0.96%
2024	13,167	+1.81%
Source: "Censo de Población y Vivienda". National Statistics Institute.

According to the 2002 census of the National Statistics Institute, Cholchol spans an area of 4,257.9 km^{2} (1,644 sq mi) and has 10,065 inhabitants. Of these, 3,355 (33.3%) lived in urban areas and 6,710 (66.7%) in rural areas. The population grew by 9.3% (859 persons) between the 1992 and 2002 censuses.

== Administration ==
As a commune, Cholchol is a third-level administrative division of Chile administered by a communal council, headed by an alcalde who is directly elected every four years. The 2012-presente alcalde is Luis Huirilef Barra. The communal council has the following members:

- Julio Torres López (UDI)
- Silvia Francisca Huirilef Barra (PPD)
- José Amador Matamala Molina (RN)
- Juan Neculhual Tropa (PPD)
- Israel Gutiérrez Narváez (DC)
- Samuel Curamil Huircapán (UDI)

Within the electoral divisions of Chile, Cholchol belongs to the 51st electoral district and 15th senatorial constituency.
