= Nueva Imperial =

- City and Commune
- Monument to Cacique Lemunao in Nueva Imperial

- Coat of arms Map of Nueva Imperial commune in Araucanía Region Location in Chile
- Coordinates (city): 38°44′36″S 72°57′0″W
- Country: Chile
- Region: Araucanía
- Province: Cautín
- Founded: 1551

Government
  - Type: Municipality

Area
  - Total: 732.5 km^{2} (282.8 sq mi)
- Elevation: 20 m (66 ft)

Population (2012 Census)
  - Total: 29,366
  - Density: 40.09/km^{2} (103.8/sq mi)
  - Urban: 18,335
  - Rural: 21,724

Sex
  - Men: 20,423
  - Women: 19,636
- Time zone: UTC−4 (CLT)
  - Summer (DST): UTC−3 (CLST)
- Area code: country + city = 56 + 45
- Climate: Csb
- Website: Municipality of Nueva Imperial

Nueva Imperial (New Imperial, in English) is a city and commune in the south of Chile. It is located in Cautín Province in the Araucanía Region. Nueva Imperial lies about 35 km (22 mi) to the west of Temuco, the regional capital.

== Geography ==
Nueva Imperial is located in a region with abundant natural resources: volcanoes, mountains, rivers, hot springs, valleys, and native forests, which include stands of araucaria trees. The city is traversed by the Chol-Chol and Cautín Rivers, which together form the Imperial River. The Imperial River flows into the Pacific Ocean at the town of Puerto Saavedra. Both are navigable by boat and support fishing for trout and other species as well as canoeing and kayaking.

== History ==
What is now the city of Nueva Imperial was founded in 1551 by Pedro de Valdivia, the Spanish conquistador, under the name La Imperial. He intended it to be one of the most important cities in colonial Chile, perhaps even the capital of the country. However, it was destroyed twice by the local indigenous population, the Mapuche. It was totally abandoned in 1599 because of the attacks.

In 1882, a new city was built on the site called Carahue (in Mapudungun, the language of the Mapuches, the name means “The City that Was”). That same year, Imperial was refounded about 12 miles from the original location and renamed Nueva Imperial (New Imperial). 8 miles from Nueva Imperial one can find vestiges of the old Spanish fort Boroa.

Cacique (Chief) Lemunao was the leader of the people in the area. He sold the land that later became Nueva Imperial to the Spanish. Today, there is a wooden monument to him on the edge of the city. It stands 6.5 feet tall.

== Demographics ==
Historical population
Year	Pop.	±% p.a.
1885	22,615	—
1895	16,665	−3.01%
1907	19,581	+1.35%
1920	26,140	+2.25%
1930	31,550	+1.90%
1940	33,361	+0.56%
1952	28,252	−1.38%
1970	30,442	+0.42%
1982	34,051	+0.94%
1992	36,878	+0.80%
2002	29,994	−2.04%
2017	32,510	+0.54%
2024	33,988	+0.64%
Source: "Censo de Población y Vivienda". National Statistics Institute.

According to the 2002 census of the National Statistics Institute, Nueva Imperial spans an area of 1,160.4 km^{2} (448 sq mi) and has 40,059 inhabitants (20,423 men and 19,636 women). Of these, 18,335 (45.8%) lived in urban areas and 21,724 (54.2%) in rural areas. The population grew by 44.8% (12,387 persons) between the 1992 and 2002 censuses.

== Characteristics ==
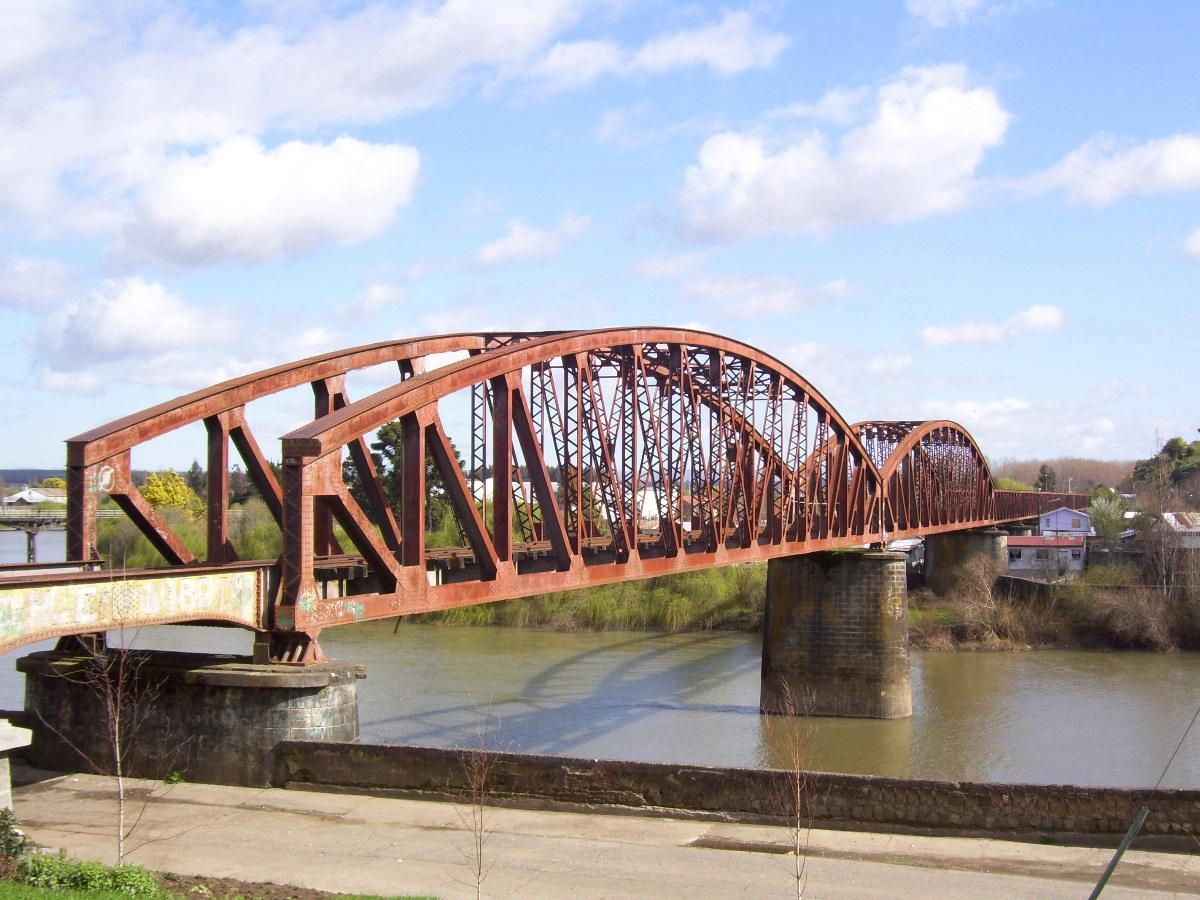
Nueva Imperial Bridge

One of the city's most notable characteristics is its bridge, which was originally a railroad crossing but is now only preserved for its beauty. It was designed by the architect and engineer Gustave Eiffel.

Nueva Imperial is also known for its colorful houses, for which it once earned the nickname “The Watercolor City.” It is gradually becoming more and more urbanized and bringing more people to the city as it offers more commercial and employment opportunities.

Nueva Imperial is actually made up of two communities, Imperial proper and a village called Villa Almagro, named after another Spanish conquistador, Diego de Almagro, which lies on the other side of the Chol Chol River. The poet Juvencio Valle, who won the national Chilean prize for literature, was born in Villa Almagro, and his house is still there. Together, the two communities make up a population of about 40,000 people.

Nueva Imperial is also divided by a large hill. The section of city that lies at the base of the hill is called El Bajo (bajo means “lower”) and El Alto (alto means “upper”). From the top of the hill, one can see the volcanoes Villarrica, Llaima, and Lonquimay as well as the surrounding countryside.

The community has one of the biggest concentrations of indigenous people in the region. For this reason, visiting the city provides a good opportunity to learn about the Mapuche language, customs, arts and crafts, and food.

== Holidays ==
The Mapuche people celebrate the new year on June 24, called Wuetripantu, which traditionally involves drinking a grain alcohol called mudai.

The last week of February is Imperial Week, which culminates in a fireworks show over the river. Another important date is September 18, which is the day of the first Government Junta of Chile (called “Fiestas Patrias”).
