= Araucanía Region =

Region of Chile

Araucanía Region Región de La Araucanía (Spanish)
- Region
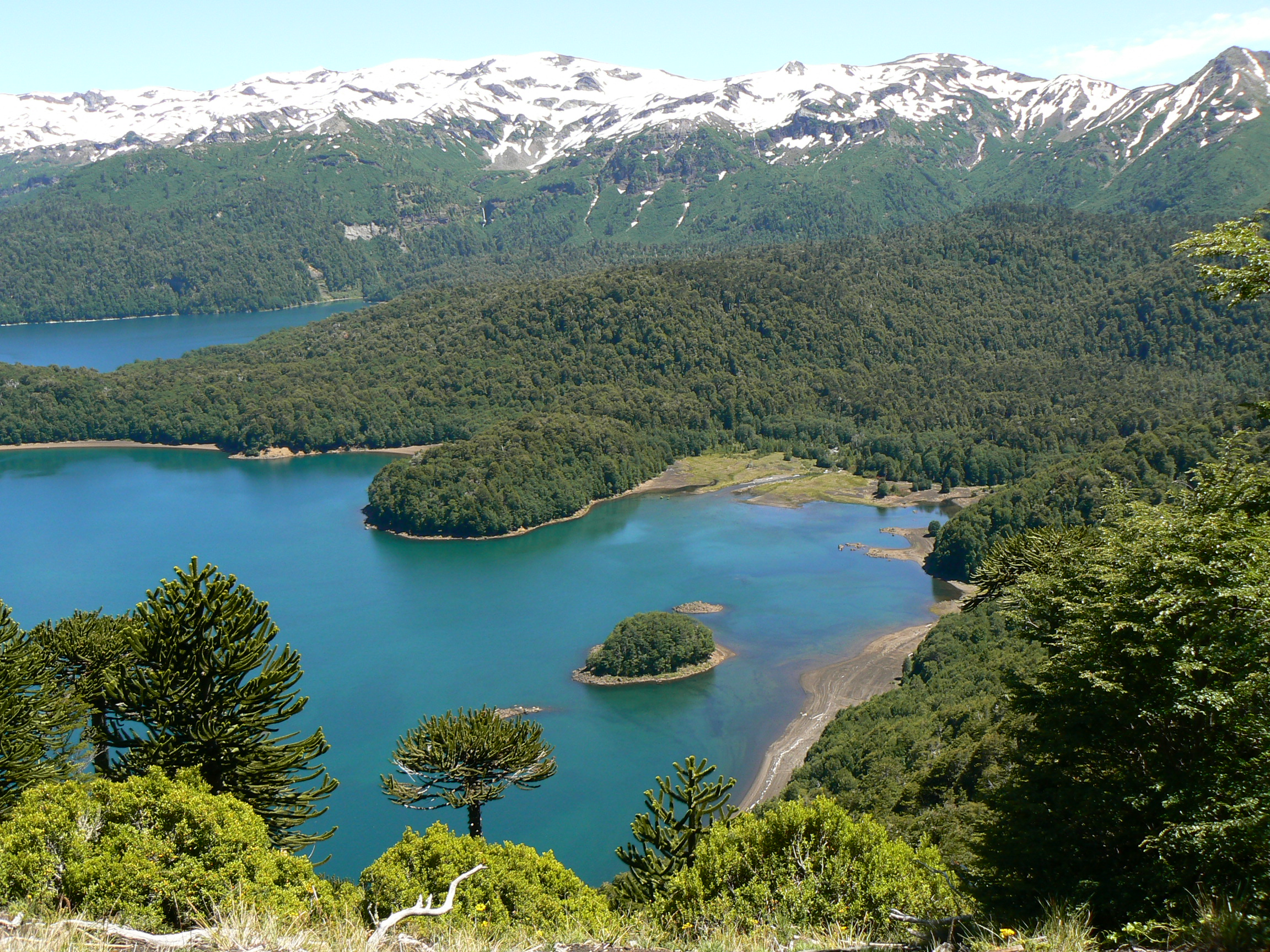
- Conguillío National Park

- Flag Seal Coat of arms

- Map of Araucanía Region
- Coordinates: 38°54′S 72°40′W
- Country: Chile
- Capital: Temuco
- Provinces: Malleco; Cautín

Government
  - Governor: René Saffirio (Ind.)
  - Presidential delegate: Francisco Ljubetic (Ind.)

Area
  - Total: 31,842.3 km^{2} (12,294.4 sq mi)
  - Rank: 8
- Highest elevation: 3,125 m (10,253 ft)
- Lowest elevation: 0 m (0 ft)

Population (2024 census)
  - Total: 1,010,423
  - Rank: 5
  - Density: 31.7321/km^{2} (82.1858/sq mi)

GDP (PPP)
  - Total: $8.238 billion (2014)
  - Per capita: $8,376 (2014)
- ISO 3166 code: CL-AR
- HDI (2022): 0.795 high
- Website: Official website (in Spanish)

The Araucanía (/ˌærɔːˈkeɪniə/ ARR-aw-KAY-nee-ə), La Araucanía Region (Spanish: Región de La Araucanía pronounced [(ˌ)aɾawkaˈni.a]) is one of Chile's 16 first-order administrative divisions, and comprises two provinces: Malleco in the north and Cautín in the south. Its capital and largest city is Temuco; other important cities include Angol and Villarrica.

Chile did not incorporate the lands of the Araucanía Region until the 1880s, when it occupied the area to end resistance by the indigenous Mapuche by both military and political means. This opened up the area for Chilean and European immigration and settlement.

In the 1900–1930 period, the population of Araucanía grew considerably, as did the economy despite recessions striking the rest of Chile. Araucanía became one of the principal agricultural districts of Chile, gaining the nickname of "granary of Chile". The administrative Araucanía Region was established in 1974, in what was the core of the larger historic region of Araucanía.

In the 21st century, Araucanía is Chile's poorest region in terms of GDP per capita. About a third of the region's population is ethnic Mapuche, the highest proportion of any Chilean region. The Araucanía Region has been the main location of the confrontations of the ongoing Mapuche conflict, as the Mapuche have pressed their land claims against the central government.

== History ==
=== Early Mapuche resistance ===
The Araucanía region is the heartland of the indigenous Mapuche people, who resisted both Incan and Spanish attempts at conquest. After sending many forces against the Mapuche, the Spanish would cut their losses, establishing the southern border of their colony at the northern banks of the Biobío River. Following the occupation of Araucanía by the Chilean government, which subdued the people, the territory has been a part of Chile ever since 1885.

=== Chilean conquest ===
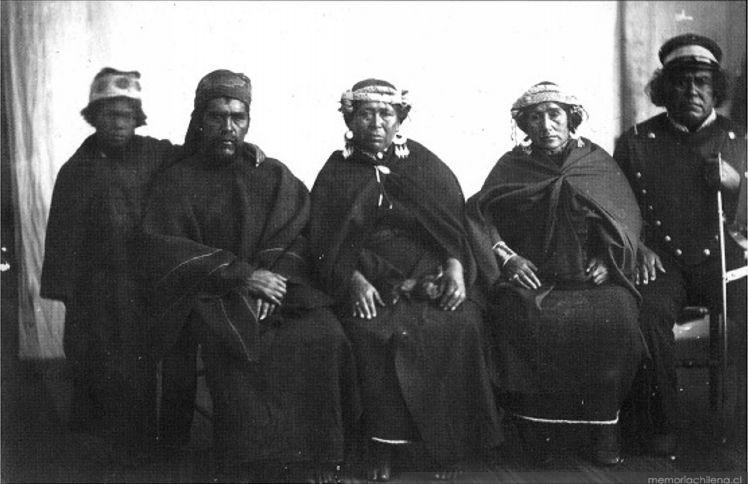
The Mapuche Cacique Juan Huaraman in the La Moneda Palace in 1863.

Following independence, the Chilean government opted for peaceful relations with the Mapuche. Effective territorial occupation did not begin until 1862. During this time, the government allowed settlers to found new towns and constructed the railroad, telegraph, and roads into the area. After an occupation and sustained military action, Araucanía was fully incorporated into Chile in 1882. Many cities and towns in Araucanía were first developed as army outposts during and after the occupation of Araucanía. The last portions of the region to be reached by the army were Alto Biobío and Toltén River's lowlands.

These are the regions where Mapuche communities have thrived the best since the Chilean conquest. With the construction of the Malleco Viaduct in the 1890s, the region became more accessible. Settlements in southern Chile became more consolidated.

=== Granary of Chile ===
Until the mid-20th century, the large agricultural estates (estancias) that were established in Araucanía were cultivated in wheat, led to its being called the "Granary of Chile". With naturally fertile soil and the implementation of modern technology such as tractors, wheat harvests were extraordinarily high, but because the farmers did not perform crop rotation, and indiscriminate logging and burning of woodlands was permitted, soils were prone to extensive erosion. They lost their fertility and much topsoil was lost to erosion.

Beginning in the 1930s, Villarrica Lake was developed as a tourism area.

=== Economic expansion and renewed Mapuche conflict ===
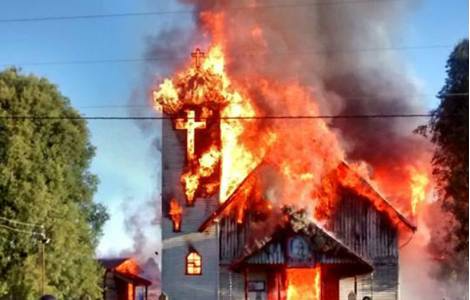
A church burns after an attack carried out by the CAM.

With the return of democracy in Chile in 1990, Mapuche organizations renewed their land claims on certain territories. Rising violence has accompanied what is now called the Mapuche conflict. Coordinadora Arauco-Malleco and similar activist groups have sometimes used arson attacks and death threats to back up their claims; other organizations, such as the Consejo de Todas Las Tierras, have sought and enjoyed international support from nongovernmental and their indigenous organizations.

== Geography ==
Virgin forests, featuring coigüe, raulí and tepa trees, as well as lingue, tihue and cordilleran cypress, criss-cross the region in all directions. The majestic conifer Araucaria araucana, or monkey-puzzle tree (known locally as pehuén), towers above the landscape. Its fruit, the piñón (a type of massive pine nut, often growing to the size and weight of a basketball or a bowling ball) is still a staple food for the indigenous Pehuenches and local residents.

A large part of this natural wealth is protected in various national parks (Nahuelbuta, Tolhuaca, Conguillío, Villarrica, and Huerquehue National Parks) and national reserves (Malalcahuello, Las Nalcas, and Alto Biobío).

== Demography ==
Historical population
| Year | Pop. | ±% p.a. |
|---|---|---|
| 1940 | 528,833 | — |
| 1952 | 524,491 | −0.07% |
| 1960 | 568,954 | +1.02% |
| 1970 | 602,010 | +0.57% |
| 1982 | 695,232 | +1.21% |
| 1992 | 781,242 | +1.17% |
| 2002 | 869,535 | +1.08% |
| 2017 | 957,224 | +0.64% |
| 2024 | 1,010,423 | +0.78% |
Source: "Censo de Población y Vivienda". National Statistics Institute.

Spanish settlers first arrived in Araucanía (one of two regional names) in the 1550s, but were unable to subdue the indigenous Mapuche.

In the late 19th century, the Chilean government endorsed a large-scale immigration and settlement program for the area. At the time, Chile often endorsed land allotment advertisement to Europeans, notably in Germany, Austria, and Switzerland, from where most of the new arrivals came. Beginning in the mid-19th century, with the German Revolutions, immigrants were often fleeing political upheaval and poor economies, seeking a new place to live. (Read German colonization of South Chile) Other immigrants included Basques, from the northern Spanish border with southwest France, and some Argentines from across the Andes.

The current population is descended mostly from internal migration from the Central Zone of Chile; to a lesser extent, it consists of descendants of European settlers who arrived during and after the "pacification of Araucanía". The region has the highest proportion of indigenous residents of any in Chile, around 25%, of which the majority is Mapuche people, with the population of 344,445. About 25% of the population is white or castizo (another form of mestizo (50%) of partial European-Amerindian descent), and a large proportion of them is at least partially descended from Spanish colonists.

In 1903, a fleet of 88 Canarian families—400 persons—arrived in Budi Lake (and currently have more than 1,000 modern descendants) as a response to the government's call to populate the region, and signed contracts for the benefit of a private company. While many Canarians obeyed their servitude, some of those who disobeyed the provisions of repopulation tried to escape their agreements and were arrested, or the indigenous Mapuche people took pity on the plight of these individuals who were on their former lands. The Mapuche welcomed some of them, and joined their demonstrations, in the so-called "revolt of the Canarians"; many Canarians integrated into the Mapuche population, thus adding to the large mestizo population that exists in Chile.

Smaller numbers of Arab (largely Syrian, Lebanese and Palestinian), Chinese, Japanese, Korean and people of Euro-North American and Australian descent settled in La Araucania in the early 20th century. Temuco has a thriving Chinese, Taiwanese, and Syrian presence, and Capitán Pastene has a largely ethnic Italian community. Villarrica was where several thousand Afrikaners (or Dutch South Africans) settled after their expulsion from South Africa, following the Boer War (1899–1903). These towns also were influenced by early Dutch colonists in the 16th century, when the region was nicknamed New Flanders. The Netherlands later ceded it to Spanish colonial rule.

During the past three decades, the city of Temuco has had the fastest rate of growth in Chile. According to the census of 1970, about 88,000 inhabitants lived in Temuco. In the census of 2000, 30 years later, the population had tripled to 250,000. The resort-town of Villarrica, on Lake Villarrica, has expanded rapidly. It is located next to the fast-growing resort of Pucón, now one of the four largest tourist destinations in Chile. According to the 2024 census, the most- populated cities are: Temuco (373,174, includes Padre Las Casas), Villarrica (67,737), Angol (53,022), Lautaro (41,936), Victoria (34,464), Nueva Imperial (33,988), Pucón (32,321), Vilcún (31,575) and Freire (26,164).

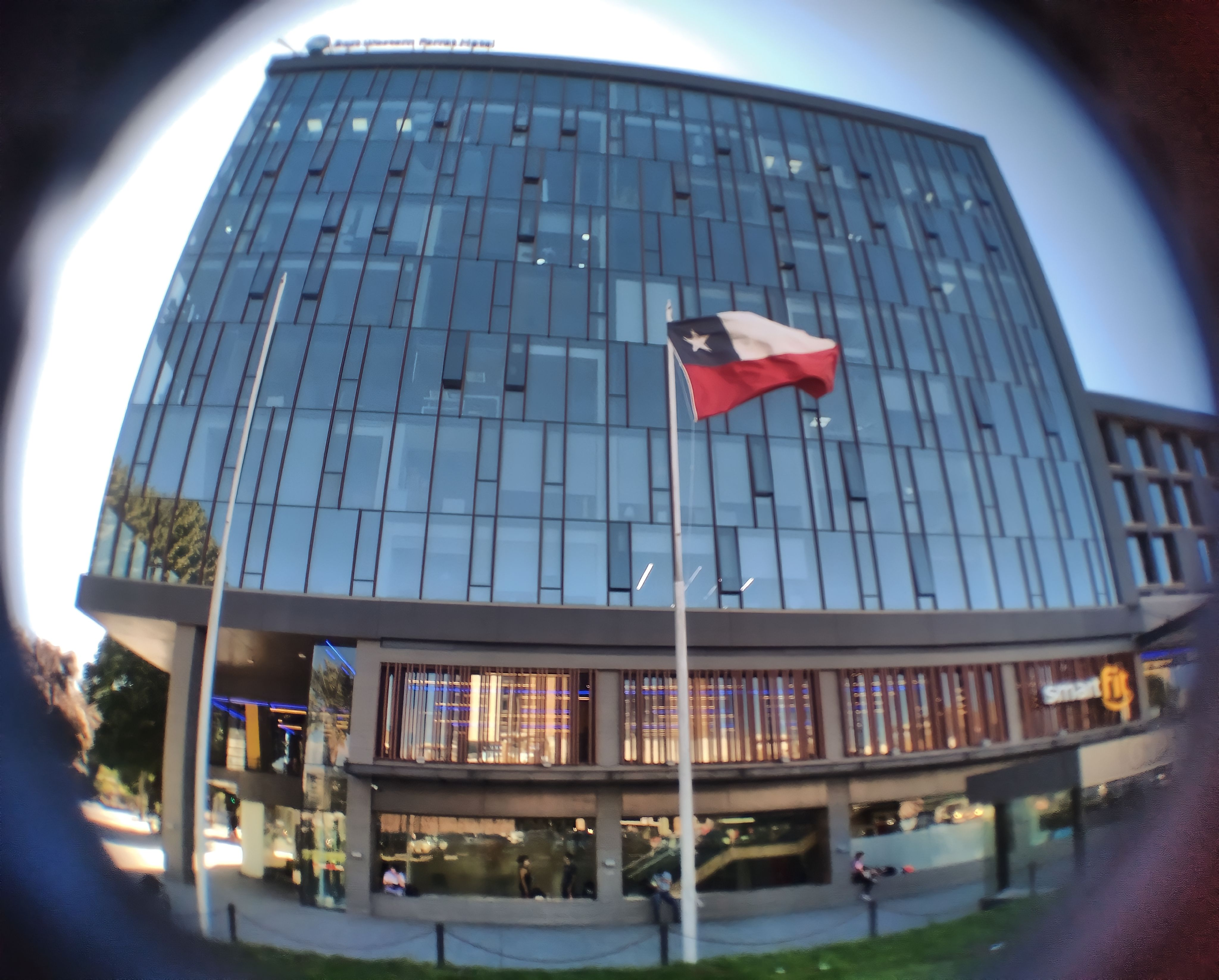
Paseo de las Artes Building, in Temuco.

== Economy ==
The main economic activity of the region is agriculture, with an emphasis on crops such as oats, barley, and rye, as well as lupin and potatoes. These crops—except for potatoes—represent the largest cultivated areas in the country. These same products have historically been the regional economic engine, at least since the incorporation of the region into Chilean territory. It is also worth highlighting the increase in berry production, such as export-oriented raspberries and blueberries, grown mainly in the Gorbea area. In addition, livestock production is also notable, especially in the cattle sector, which makes the region the second-largest producer in Chile, reaching more than 700,000 head of cattle annually. In recent years, forestry activity—particularly involving pine and eucalyptus plantations—has experienced considerable growth, mainly in the province of Malleco.

The region has great tourism potential due to the beauty of its landscape—made up of forests, lakes, rivers, volcanoes, and mountains—and offers a wide range of hotel and resort services.

In 2018, the number of registered companies in the Araucanía Region was 20,410. In the same year, the Economic Complexity Index (ECI) stood at 0.21, while the economic activities with the highest Revealed Comparative Advantage (RCA) were the manufacture of charcoal and briquettes (43.86), primary and secondary education establishments for adults (30.57), and wholesale trade of solid fuels (13.71).

== Municipalities ==
The region consists of 38 municipalities:

- Angol
- Carahue
- Cholchol
- Collipulli
- Cunco
- Curacautín
- Curarrehue
- Ercilla
- Freire
- Galvarino
- Gorbea
- Lautaro
- Loncoche
- Lonquimay
- Los Sauces
- Lumaco
- Melipeuco
- Nueva Imperial
- Padre Las Casas
- Perquenco
- Pitrufquén
- Pucón
- Purén
- Renaico
- Saavedra
- Temuco
- Teodoro Schmidt
- Toltén
- Traiguén
- Victoria
- Vilcún
- Villarrica

== See also ==
- Araucana breed in this area
- Araucanization of Patagonia
- Arauco War
- Occupation of Araucanía
- Kingdom of Araucanía and Patagonia
