= Cunco, Chile =

Cunco
- City and Commune
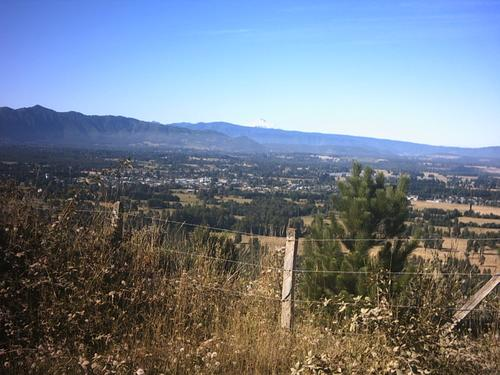

- Map of Carahue commune in the Araucanía Region Location in Chile
- Coordinates (city): 38°55′S 72°02′W
- Country: Chile
- Region: Araucanía
- Province: Cautín

Government
  - Type: Municipality
  - Alcalde: Patricio Mittersteiner Garrido

Area
  - Total: 1,906.5 km^{2} (736.1 sq mi)
- As of 2002
- Elevation: 364 m (1,194 ft)

Population (2012 Census)
  - Total: 15,628
  - Density: 8.1972/km^{2} (21.231/sq mi)
  - Urban: 8,806
  - Rural: 9,897

Sex
  - Men: 9,203
  - Women: 9,500
- Time zone: UTC−4 (CLT)
  - Summer (DST): UTC−3 (CLST)
- Postal code: 5010000
- Area code: 56 + 45
- Website: Municipality of Cunco

Cunco is a Chilean commune and city in Cautín Province, Araucanía Region. The town is located 60 km southeast of the city of Temuco and 77 km west of Icalma International Pass.

The major geographical features of this commune are the Allipén River and the Colico Lake.

According to Friar Ernesto Wilhelm de Moesbach Cunco is etymologically derived from the Mapuche language's word for "dark red" (cun) "water" (co) meaning water with volcanic ash or silt.

== History ==
Cunco was founded by Colonel Gregorio Urrutia in 1883 as a frontier fort, between the marshes Cunco and Nahuelcura, and close to a tributary to the Allipén river. The arrival of the railroad at the beginning of the twentieth century accelerated its urban development. It changed legal status to "commune" on 20 August 1918.

In 1918 Cunco was the ending point of the first flight by an airplane across the Andes, when Luis Candelaria flew from Zapala, Argentina, on April 13.

== Demographics ==
Historical population
Year	Pop.	±% p.a.
1895	2,808	—
1907	11,691	+12.62%
1920	12,915	+0.77%
1930	18,269	+3.53%
1940	23,043	+2.35%
1952	21,636	−0.52%
1970	16,119	−1.62%
1982	16,834	+0.36%
1992	18,339	+0.86%
2002	18,703	+0.20%
2017	17,526	−0.43%
2024	19,177	+1.29%
Source: "Censo de Población y Vivienda". National Statistics Institute.

According to the 2002 census of the National Statistics Institute, Cunco spans an area of 1,906.5 km^{2} (736 sq mi) and has 18,703 inhabitants (9,203 men and 9,500 women). Of these, 8,806 (47.1%) lived in urban areas and 9,897 (52.9%) in rural areas. The population grew by 2% (364 persons) between the 1992 and 2002 censuses.

== Administration ==
As a commune, Cunco is a third-level administrative division of Chile administered by a communal council, headed by an alcalde who is directly elected every four years. The 2008-2012 alcalde is Patricio Mittersteiner Garrido. The communal council has the following members:

- Osvaldo Inostroza Mora
- Danilo Urrutia Cárcamo
- Rene Sepulveda Ceballos
- Patricio Oakley Oviedo
- Cristian Moraga Lagos
- Alfonso Coke Candia

Within the electoral divisions of Chile, Zapallar belongs to the 52nd electoral district and 15th senatorial constituency.
