= Teodoro Schmidt, Chile =

Teodoro Schmidt
- Town and Commune
- Location of the commune of Teodoro Schmidt in the Araucanía Region Location in Chile
- Coordinates: 38°59′41.5″S 73°05′21.8″W
- Country: Chile
- Region: Araucanía
- Province: Cautín

Government
  - Type: Municipality
  - Alcalde: Alfredo Waldemar Riquelme Arriagada

Area
  - Town and Commune: 649.9 km^{2} (250.9 sq mi)
- Elevation: 37 m (121 ft)

Population (2017 Census)
  - Town and Commune: 15,504
  - Density: 23.86/km^{2} (61.79/sq mi)
  - Urban: 6,244
  - Rural: 9,260
- Demonym: Teodorino

Sex
  - Men: 8,136
  - Women: 7,368
- Time zone: UTC-4 (CLT)
  - Summer (DST): UTC-3 (CLST)
- Area code: (+56) 45
- Website: Municipality of Teodoro Schmidt

Teodoro Schmidt is a Chilean town and commune located in Cautín Province, Araucanía Region. Teodoro Schmidt spans a coastal area of 649.9 km^{2} (251 sq mi). The main settlements of the commune are Teodoro Schmidt, Hualpín and Barros Arana.

== Demographics ==
Historical population
| Year | Pop. | ±% p.a. |
|---|---|---|
| 1970 | 12,570 | — |
| 1982 | 13,179 | +0.40% |
| 1992 | 15,028 | +1.32% |
| 2002 | 15,504 | +0.31% |
| 2017 | 15,045 | −0.20% |
| 2024 | 15,639 | +0.55% |
Source: "Censo de Población y Vivienda". National Statistics Institute.

According to data from the 2002 Census of Population and Housing, Teodoro Schmidt had 15,504 inhabitants; of these, 6,244 (40.3%) lived in urban areas and 9,260 (59.7%) in rural areas. At that time, there were 8,136 men and 7,368 women.

== Administration ==
As a commune, Teodoro Schmidt is a third-level administrative division of Chile administered by a communal council, headed by an alcalde who is directly elected every four years. The 2016-2021 mayor is Alfredo Riquelme Arriagada.

Within the electoral divisions of Chile, Teodoro Schmidt belongs to the 51st electoral district and 15th senatorial constituency.

== See also ==
- List of towns in Chile
