= National Statistics Institute (Chile) =

Chile government institution

National Institute of Statistics
- Instituto Nacional de Estadísticas
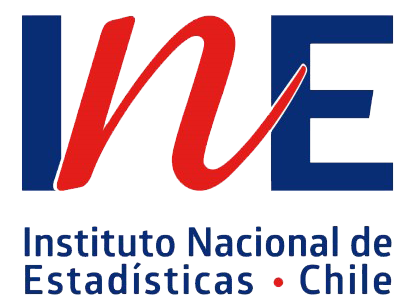

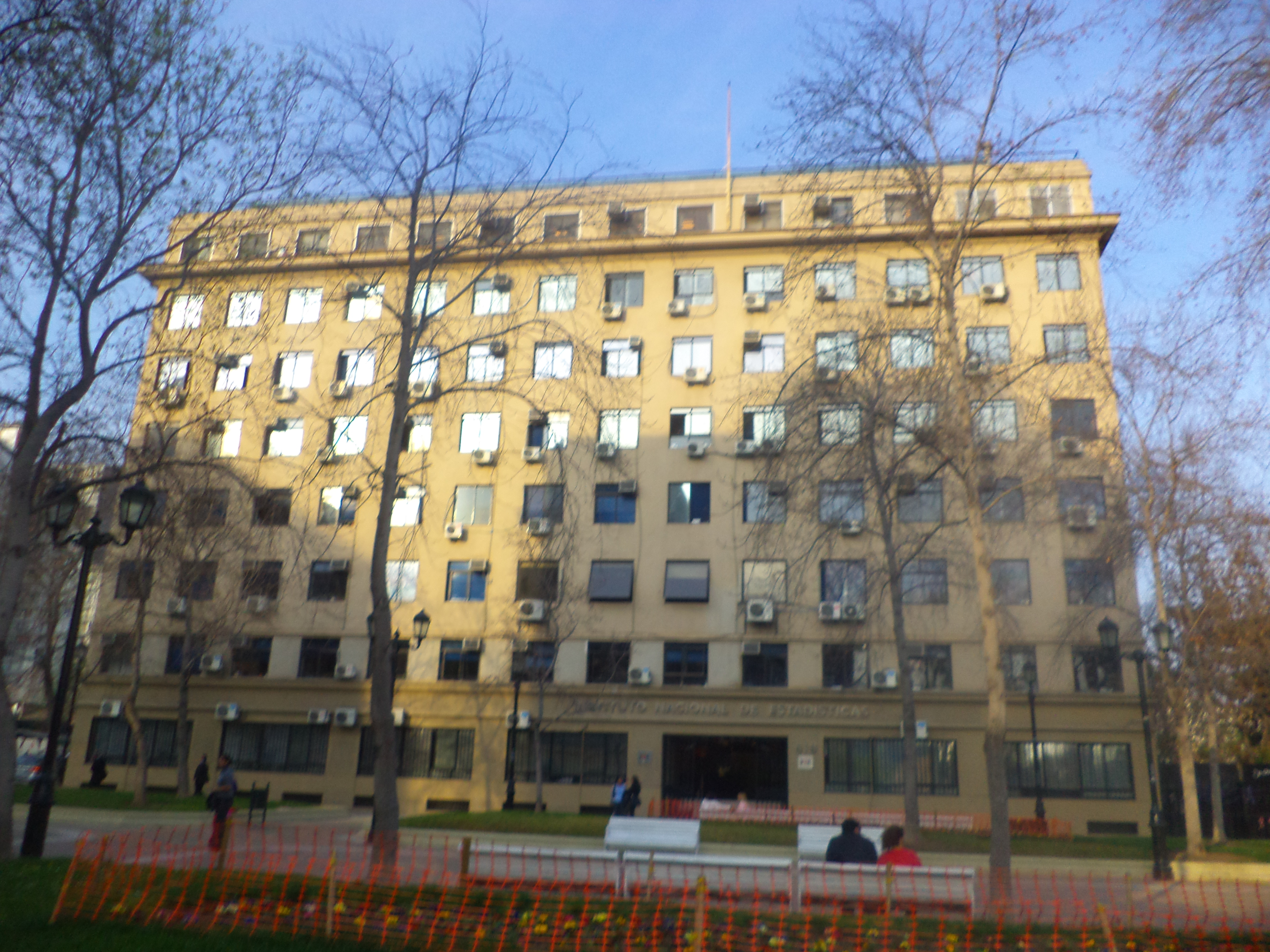
- Headquarters of the National Institute of Statistics

Agency overview
- Formed: 1843
- Type: Statistical service
- Jurisdiction: Government of Chile
- Headquarters: Morandé 801; Santiago
- Agency executive: Sandra Quijada Javer, Directora
- Website: Official website (in Spanish)

The National Statistics Institute of Chile (Spanish: Instituto Nacional de Estadística de Chile, INE) is a state-run organization of the Government of Chile, created in the second half of the 19th century and tasked with performing a general census of population and housing, then collecting, producing and publishing official demographic statistics of people in Chile, in addition to other specific tasks entrusted to it by law.

== Background ==
Its antecedents lie in the initiatives of president Manuel Bulnes and his minister, Manuel Rengifo, to draw up the second population census and obtain statistical data of the country. By Decree No. 18 March 27, 1843, the Office of Statistics was created, Ministry of the Interior to provide knowledge of the departments and provinces. It put the INE in charge of producing the national population census every 10 years, as required by the Census Act of July 12, 1843.

Law No. 187 of September 17, 1847 established the office as a permanent body of the state. By 1853, it was legally required that each section chief of the ministries collect and submit data to the Bureau of Statistics. Subsequently, and by various legal modifications, it was called Dirección General de Estadísticas (1927–1953), Servicio Nacional de Estadísticas y Censos (1953–1960), Dirección de Estadísticas y Censos (1960–1970). It has called by its current name since 1970, and it has been under the Ministry of Economy since 1927.

== Publications ==
The first official publication, National Repertoire (Repertorio Nacional), was released in 1850. It was followed by the Statistical Yearbook of the Republic of Chile (Anuario Estadístico de la República de Chile) published without interruption from 1837 to 1866.

In 1882 they published Statistical and Geographical Synopsis of Chile (Sinopsis Estadística y Geografía de Chile). In 1911, they began publishing independent volumes of statistics by subject.

The National Statistics Institute publishes the Mining Production Index (Índice de Producción Minera or IPMin) each month to estimate the state of large and medium-scale mining in Chile. The index is calculated using 2014 as the base year (2014=100) and is presented as General Index with two subindexes; one about copper mining and another about "other mines and quarries". The index is also presented in a broken-down form for each region.
