= Agriculture in Chile =

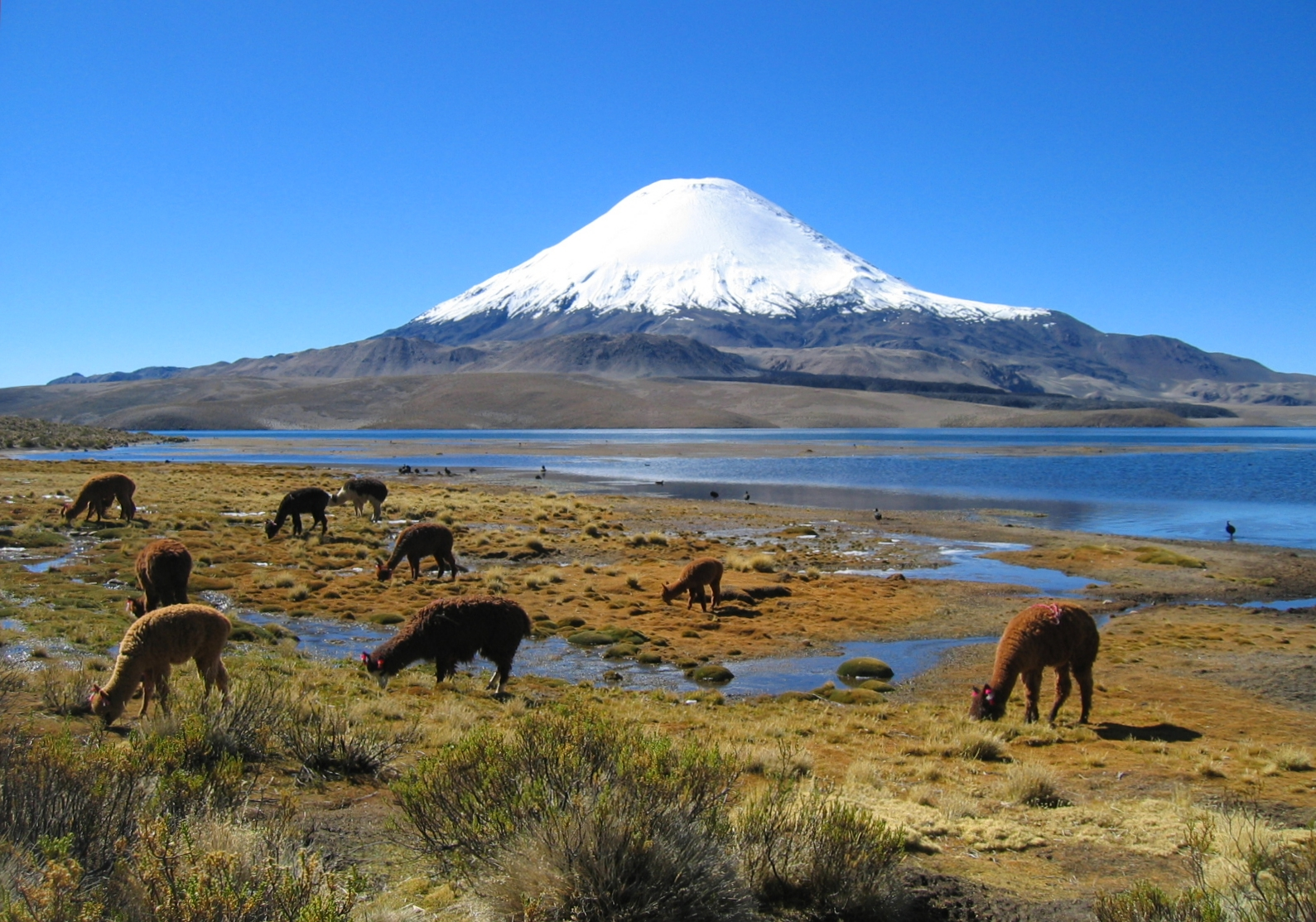
Llamas in Lauca National Park

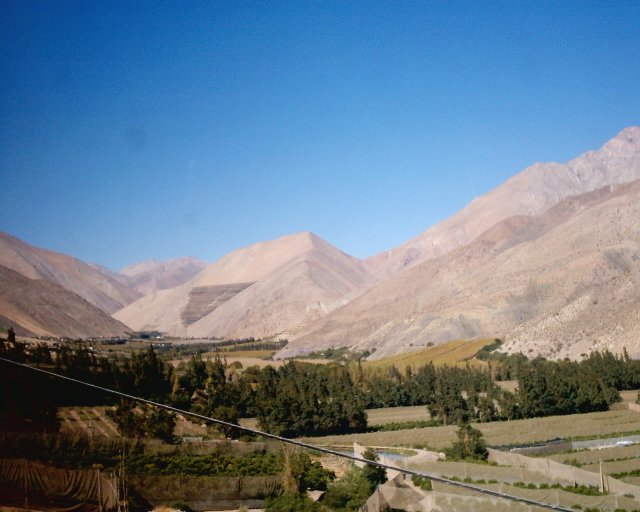
Agriculture in Elqui valley

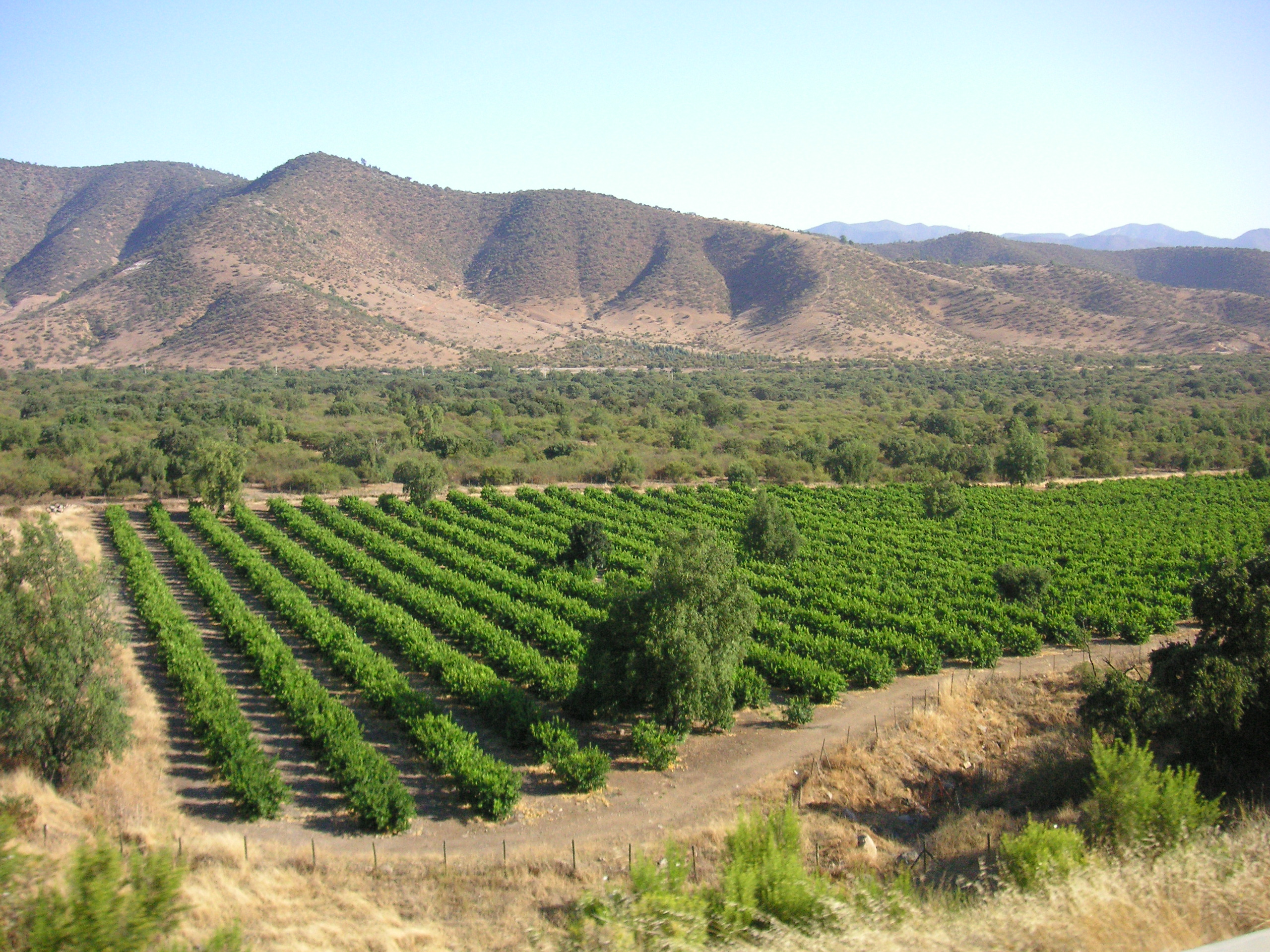
Many of Chile's vineyards are found on dorp land within the foothills of the Andes.

Agriculture in Chile encompasses a wide range of different activities due to the country's particular geography, climate, geology and human factors. Historically, agriculture has been one of the bases of Chile's economy; in 2007, it and allied sectors, like forestry, logging, and fishing, accounted for only 4.9% of the GDP and 13.6% of the country's labor force. Major agricultural products include grapes, apples, onions, wheat, corn, oats, peaches, garlic, asparagus, beans, beef, poultry, wool, fish and timber.

Due to its geographical isolation and strict customs policies, Chile is free from mad cow disease and diseases brought by Drosophilidae and Phylloxera; this, its different harvest season compared to countries in the Northern Hemisphere, and its wide range of agricultural conditions are considered its main comparative advantages. However, the mountainous landscape limits the extent and intensity of agriculture. Only 2.62% of the country's territory is arable land.

Chile's principal growing region and agricultural heartland is the Central Valley, bounded by the Chilean Coast Range to the west, the Andes to the east, Aconcagua River to the north, and Bío-Bío River to the south. In the northern half of Chile, cultivation is highly dependent on irrigation. South of the Central Valley, cultivation has gradually been replaced by aquaculture, silviculture, sheep and cattle farming.

== Production ==
Graph of the world export of cherries from 2012 to 2021, showing how this market has doubled in size and Chile's leadership.

Chile is one of the 5 largest world producers of cherry and cranberry, and one of the 10 largest world producers of grape, apple, kiwifruit, peach, plum and hazelnut, focusing on exporting high-value fruits.

In 2018, Chile was the 9th largest producer of grape in the world, with 2 million tons produced; the 10th largest producer of apple in the world, with 1.7 million tons produced; and the 6th largest producer of kiwifruit in the world, with 230 thousand tons produced, in addition to producing 1.4 million tons of wheat, 1.1 million tons of maize, 1.1 million tons of potato, 951 thousand tons of tomato, 571 thousand tons of oats, 368 thousand tons of onion, 319 thousand tons of peach, 280 thousand tons of pear, 192 thousand tons of rice, 170 thousand tons of barley, 155 thousand tons of cherry, 151 thousand tons of lemon, 118 thousand tons of tangerine, 113 thousand tons of orange, 110 thousand tons of olives, 106 thousand tons of cranberry, in addition to smaller productions of other agricultural products.

=== Aquaculture in Chile ===
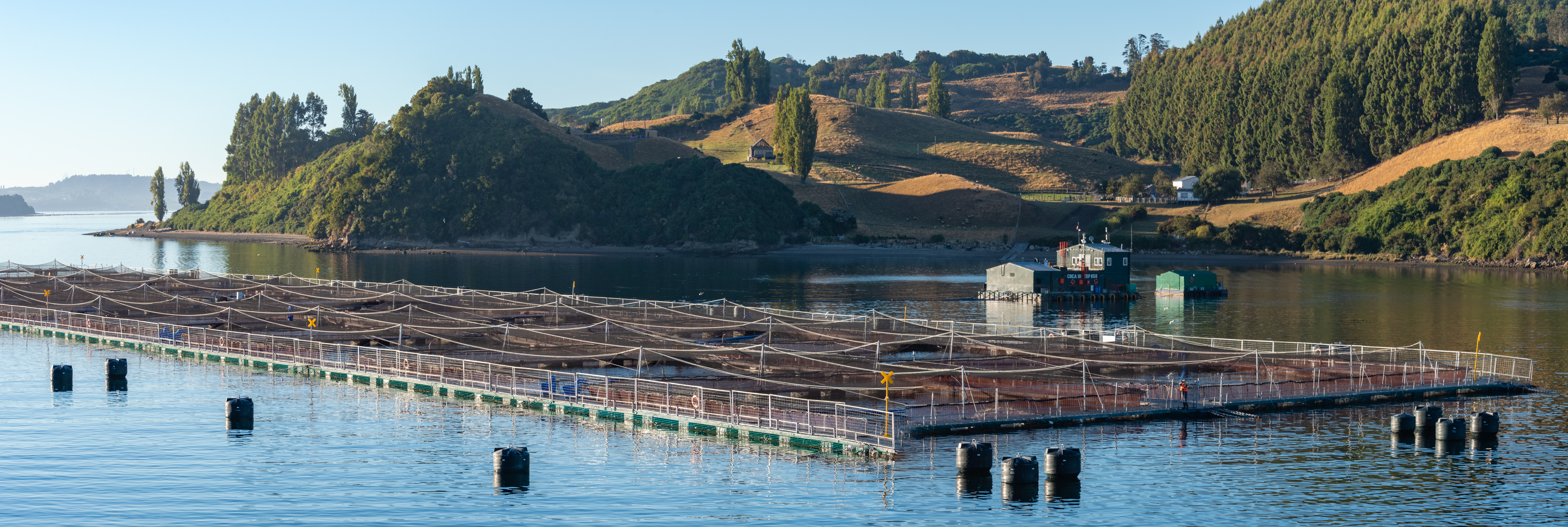
Aquaculture fish farming in the Estero de Castro inlet of Chiloé Island

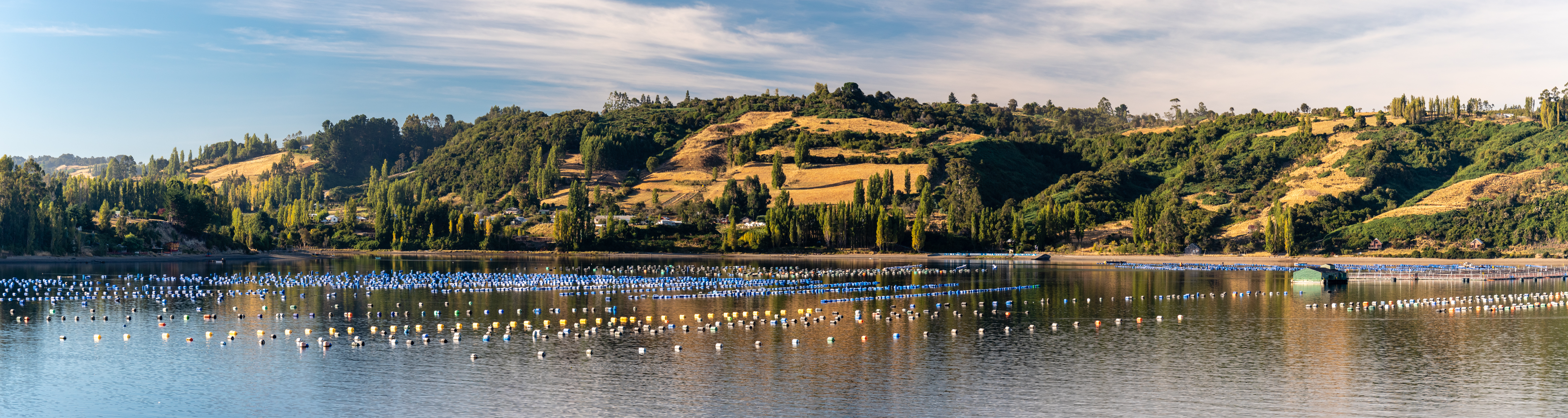
Mussel aquaculture farming in the fjords of southern Chile

Aquaculture is a major economic activity in Chile. Among the diverse aquacultures practised in Chile, Atlantic salmon aquaculture is by far the largest sector. Apart from salmon and trout, Chilean aquaculture also produces turbots and molluscs, in particular Mytilus platensis (still often referred to as Mytilus chilensis), Northern scallops, Pacific oysters, Aulacomya ater (a giant mussel), red abalone, and Chilean oysters. In terms of algae Gracillaria chilensis is cultivated and harvested.

The main areas of aquaculture in Chile lie in the southern half of the country, in particular in the interior waters of Los Lagos Region and to a lesser extent the fjords and channels of more southern Aysén and Magallanes regions.

=== Wine ===
In red, the "Ancient Chile" within the Captaincy General of Chile during the colonial era, the largest wine-growing area today

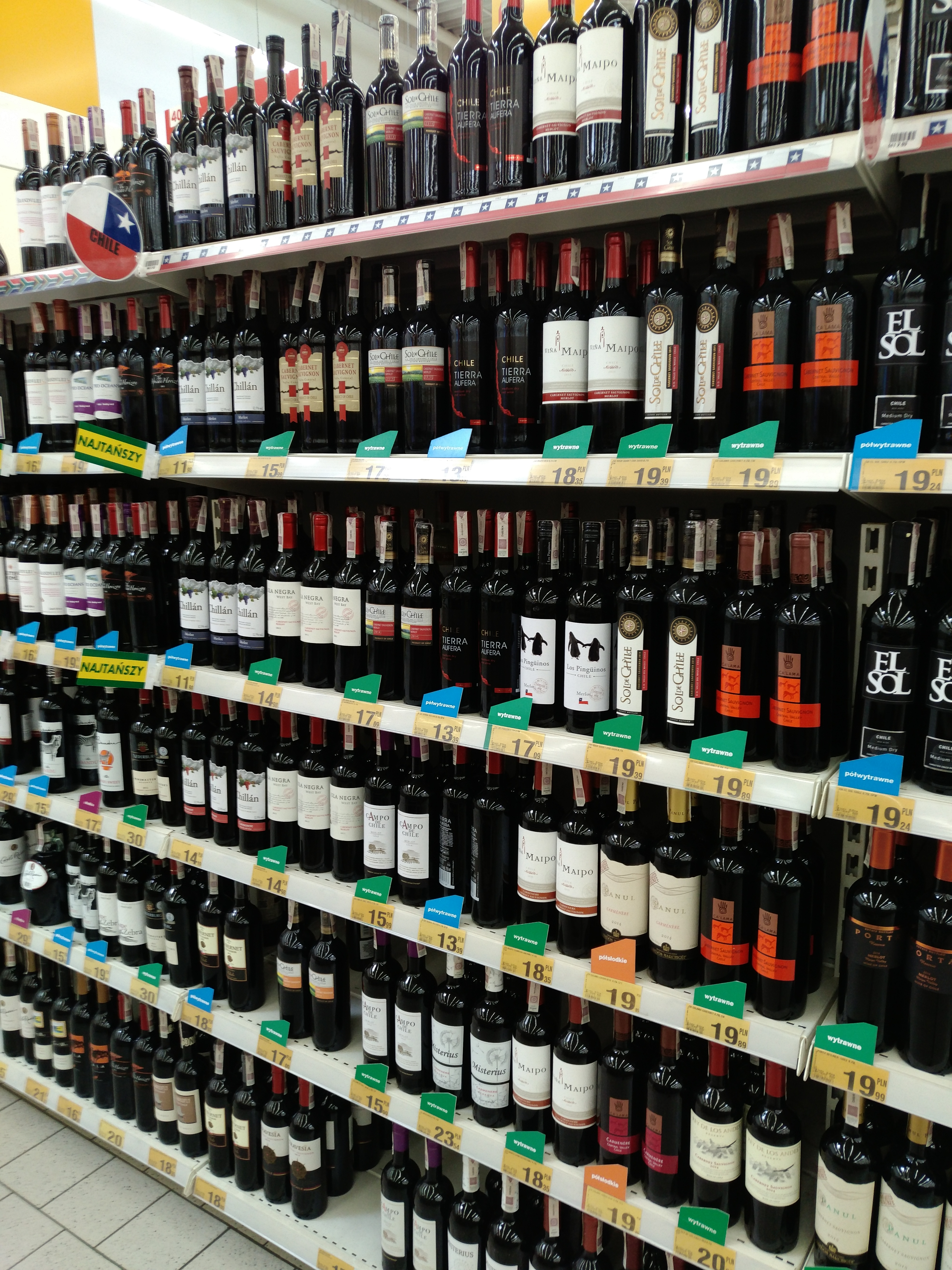
Chilean wines

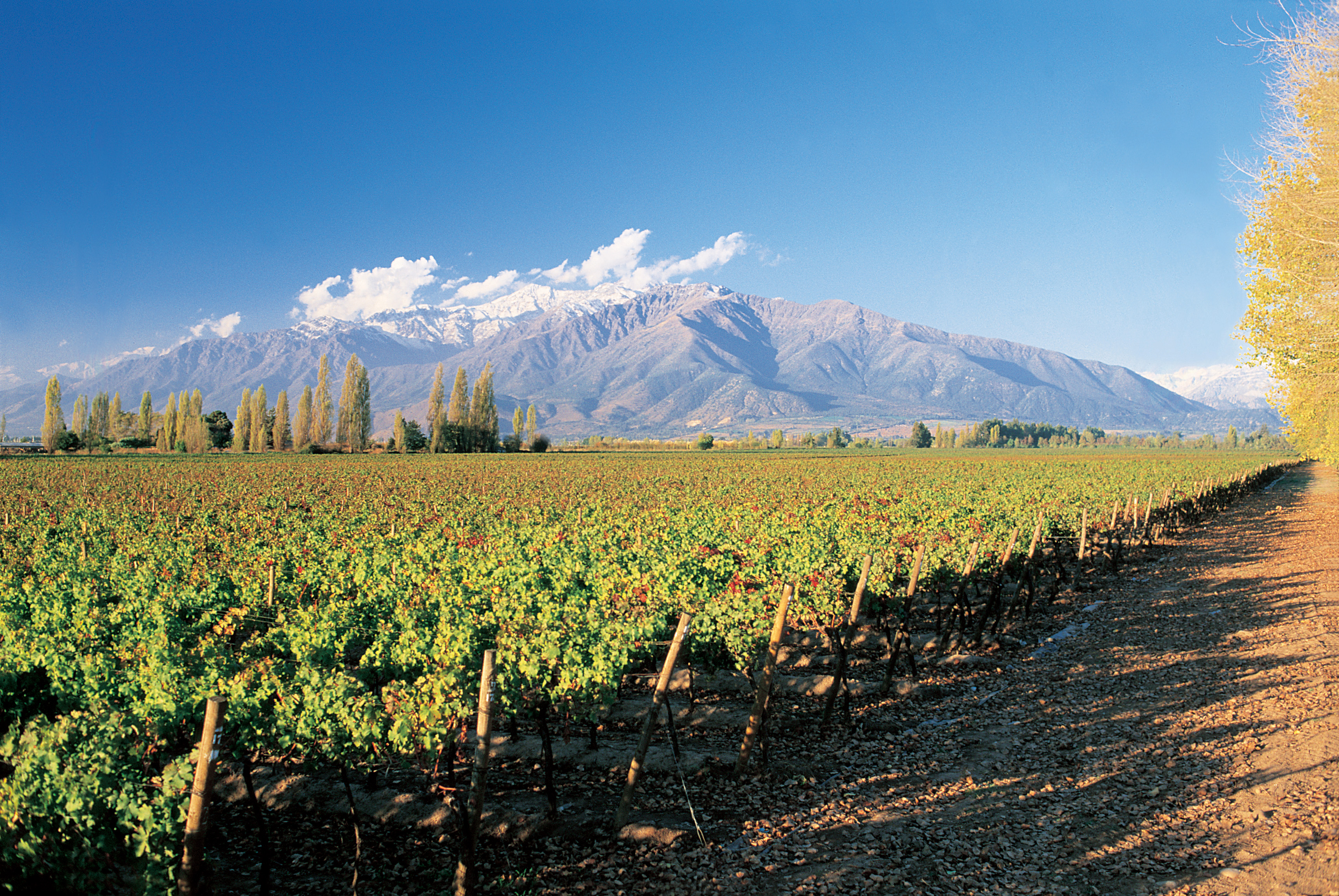
View of Chilean vineyards in the foothills of the Andes.

Chile has a long history in the production of wine, with roots dating back to the 16th century when the Spanish conquistadors introduced Vitis vinifera vines to the region. In the mid-19th century, French wine varieties such as Cabernet Sauvignon, Merlot, Carmenère, and Cabernet Franc were introduced. During the early 1980s, the Chilean wine industry underwent a renaissance with the introduction of stainless steel fermentation tanks and the use of oak barrels for aging. This led to a rapid growth in exports as quality wine production increased. The number of wineries in Chile rose from 12 in 1995 to over 70 in 2005.

The late 20th century saw a large number of French immigrants settling in Chile, bringing with them extensive viticultural knowledge. Today, Chile stands as the fifth largest exporter of wine globally and the seventh largest producer. The climate in Chile has been described as a fusion of the climates in California and France. The most commonly grown grape variety in the country are Cabernet Sauvignon, Merlot, and Carmenère. Chile is also fortunate to remain free of the phylloxera louse, which means that its grapevines do not require grafting with phylloxera-resistant rootstocks.

=== Forestry ===
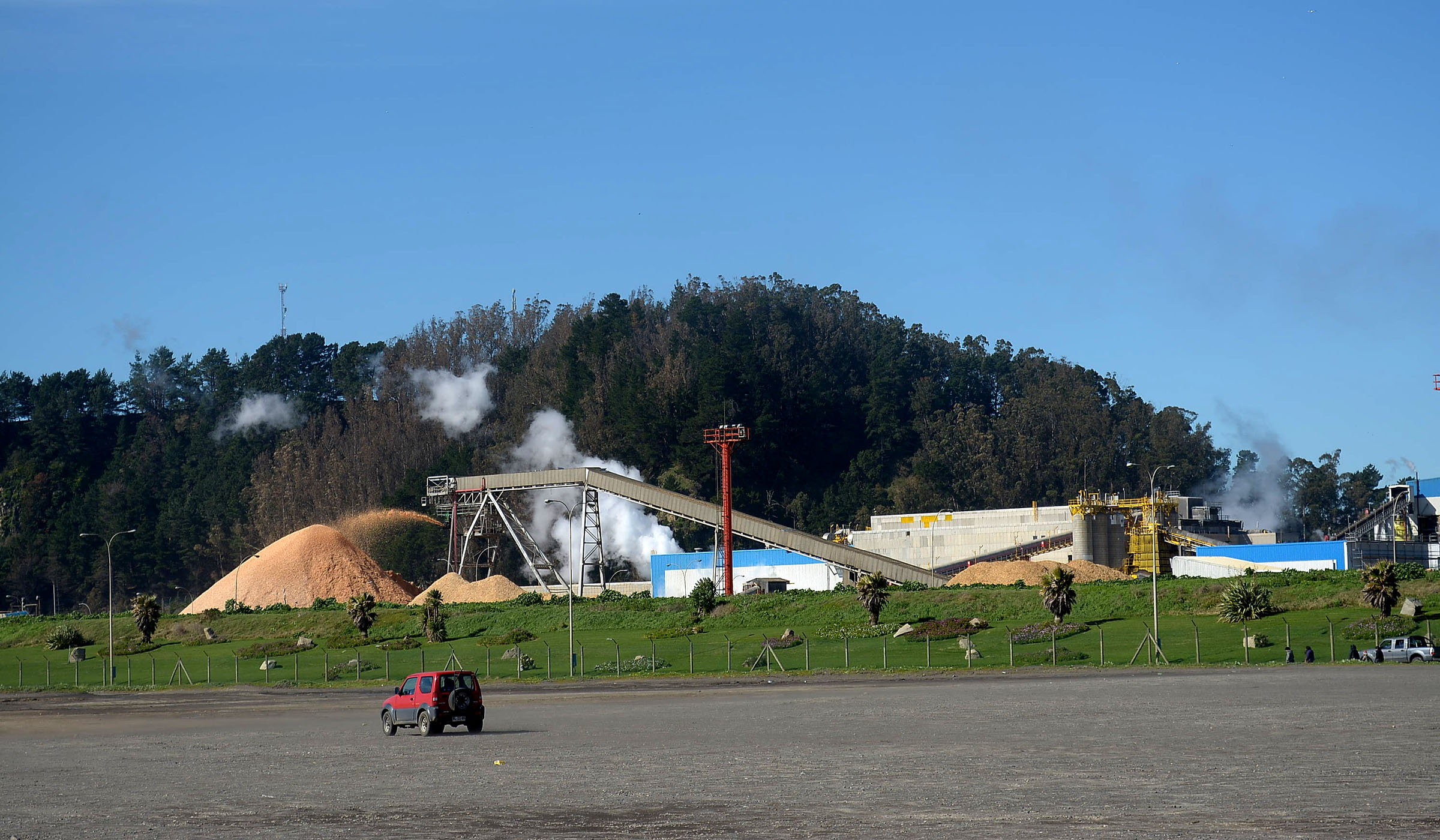
Pile of wood chips at Constitución.

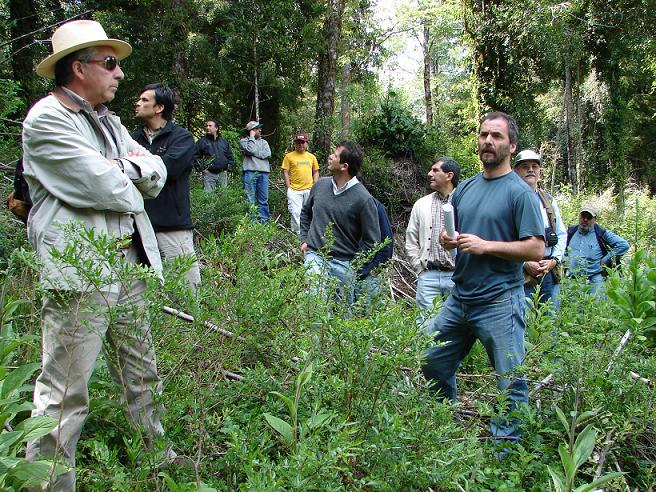
Foresters of the Austral University of Chile in the forests of San Pablo de Tregua

Forestry is one of the main economic sectors of Chile, representing 14% of the value of the country's total exports. This places the forestry sector in Chile as the second largest export sector behind copper mining. From 1970 to 2005 planted forest surface in Chile grew from 300,000 ha to more than 2.07 million ha. In 2019 Chile had slightly more than 2,3 million ha of forest plantations of which 1,3 million ha were Pinus radiata and 0,9 million ha were of Eucalyptus globulus and Eucalyptus nitens. In 2006 70% of Chile's forestry production went to export, and the industry employed more than 150,000 workers. By 2020 people employed in the sector were down to 112,200.

The wave of forest plantations that begun in the 1970s was initially a response to severe soil erosion that affected much of the country. There was a broad support for plantations when these were first implemented but by the 1980s a conservationist critique had grown exposing the adverse effects of plantations on certain plant and animal species, on biodiversity and on water resources. In many cases the establishment of plantations meant not reforestation but the replacement of existing forests with plantations.

The growth of the forestry sector since the 1980s is the consequence of growth of the export-oriented economy in Chile. Critics argue it has created an enclave economy. In the area of Cañete and Tirúa forestry companies have been accused of contributing to the displacement of indigenous Mapuche communities. In the last decades the communities of Temucuicui have had a conflict, at times physically violent, with the forestry company Forestal Mininco, leading to the detention and imprisonment of community members in the prisons of Angol and Cañete.

== Agriculture by natural region ==
=== Norte Grande ===
The Norte Grande region covers most of Atacama Desert and its crop agriculture is contracted around small oases, such as Pica (known for its Limón de Pica) and Pozo Almonte. The use of water from Loa River and other streams is limited due to contamination with heavy metals from the mining industry. Some minor subsistence agriculture is practised in Loa River. Recently these waters are being used for growing non-edible plants, such as flowers. In Norte Grande's Puna plateau, indigenous Aymaras practise traditional llama and alpaca herding.

=== Norte Chico ===
Norte Chico has a semi-arid climate that limits agriculture to the Transverse Valleys, namely; Choapa, Copiapó, Elqui, Limarí and Aconcagua. Most agriculture here is dependent on irrigation. Norte Chico is known for its production of grapes for Pisco and papayas. Other crops cultivated include olives and avocados .

=== Zona Central ===
Zona Central is Chile's agricultural and cultural heartland. With its mediterranean climate, Zona Central hosts the largest part of the country's wine regions. Most of Chile's premium wine regions depend on irrigation to sustain vineyards, the necessary water formed by melting snow caps in the Andes. In the developing wine regions along the Coastal Ranges and in the far south, there is not a lack of needed rainfall but vineyards owners have to deal with other factors, such as the Humboldt Current from the Pacific which can bathe a vineyard with a blanket of cool air. For the rest of Chile's wine regions, the Coastal Ranges serve as a buffer from the current and also act as a rain shadow. The vineyards in these regions are planted on the valley plains of the Andes foothills along the major rivers such as the Maipo, Rapel and Maule Rivers.

=== Zona Sur ===
Wheat cultivation, cattle farming, silviculture and salmon aquaculture are the main agricultural activities of Zona Sur. In northern Zona Sur Araucania Region was known until recently as "Chile’s granary". Wheat in Araucanía continues to be the main crop; however, production of oats and lupine has increased significantly. While the area devoted to traditional crops and natural pasture has tended to shrink in Araucanía, there has been an increase in artificial and improved pasturelands. This supports a substantial mass of livestock, including beef cattle, swine, sheep, and horses, and abundant production of milk and by-products. Salmon aquaculture is Los Lagos Region largest source of jobs and main export industry. Nearly all of Chile's, and much of the southern hemisphere, blueberry and cranberry production is concentrated in Zona Sur.

Cultivation and production of hazelnuts in Chile is centred in the south-central regions from Maule to Los Lagos. Production increased greatly in the 2010s. In 2016 Chile exported about 6,500 tons of hazelnuts. Chilean hazelnuts are described by Reuters as an alternative to Turkish hazelnuts that dominate the international market.

=== Zona Austral ===
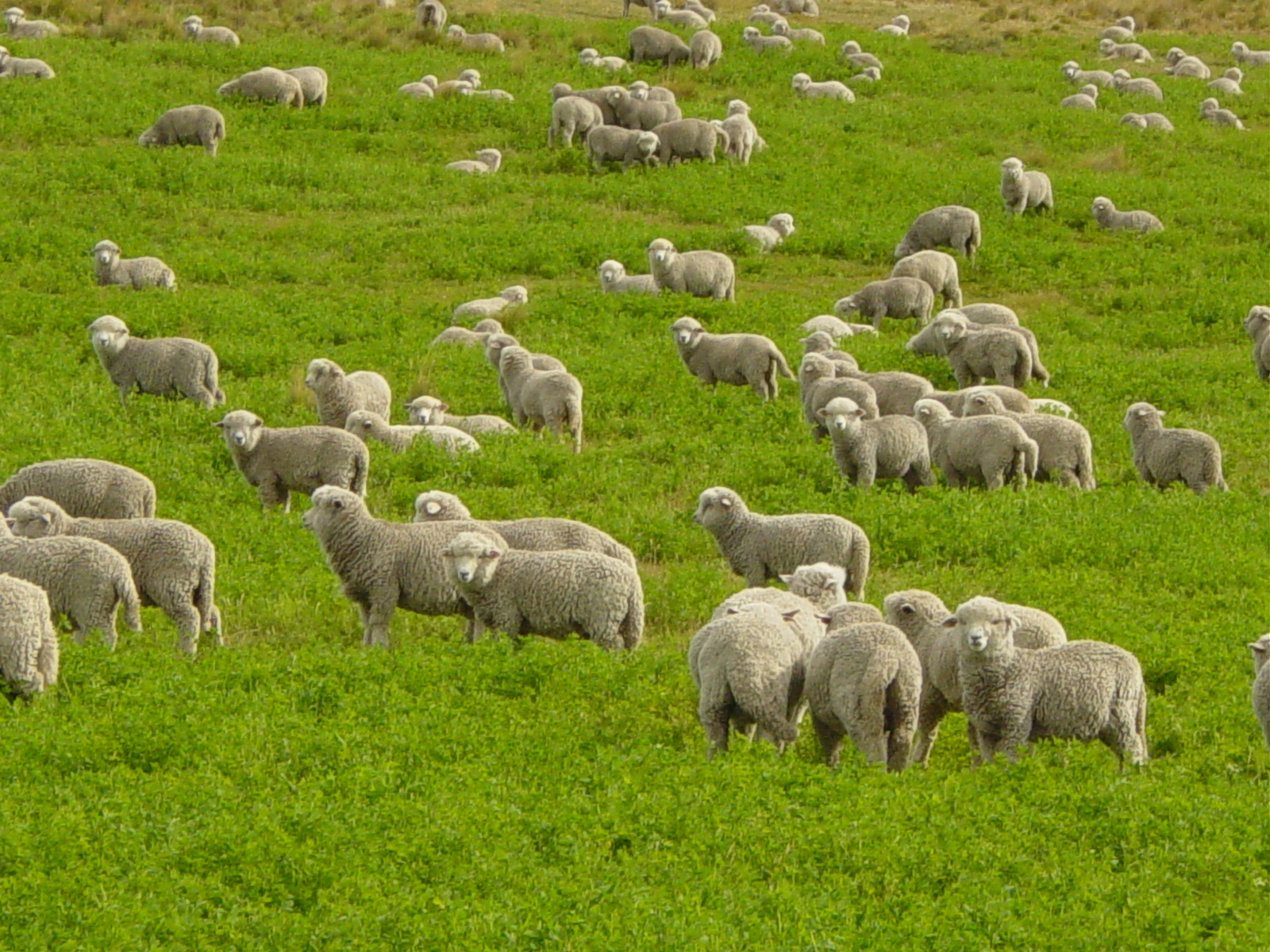
Lambs in Tierra del Fuego.

In Zona Austral, sheepherding has been a major industry since the 19th century. In the Magallanes Region alone, there is an estimate of 1.5 and 2 million sheep that is distributed among 300 farmers as of 2006. Exotic species, like reindeer, have been introduced in recent years. Agriculture in the north-western parts of Zona Austral (Aisén, Chiloé and Palena) focuses on aquaculture and silviculture and is similar to that of Zona Sur.

Evidence ranging from historical records, local agriculturalists, and DNA analyses strongly supports the hypothesis that the most widely cultivated variety of potato worldwide, Solanum tuberosum tuberosum, is indigenous to Chiloé Island and has been cultivated by the local indigenous people since before the coming of the Spanish.

== History ==
=== Pre-Hispanic agriculture ===
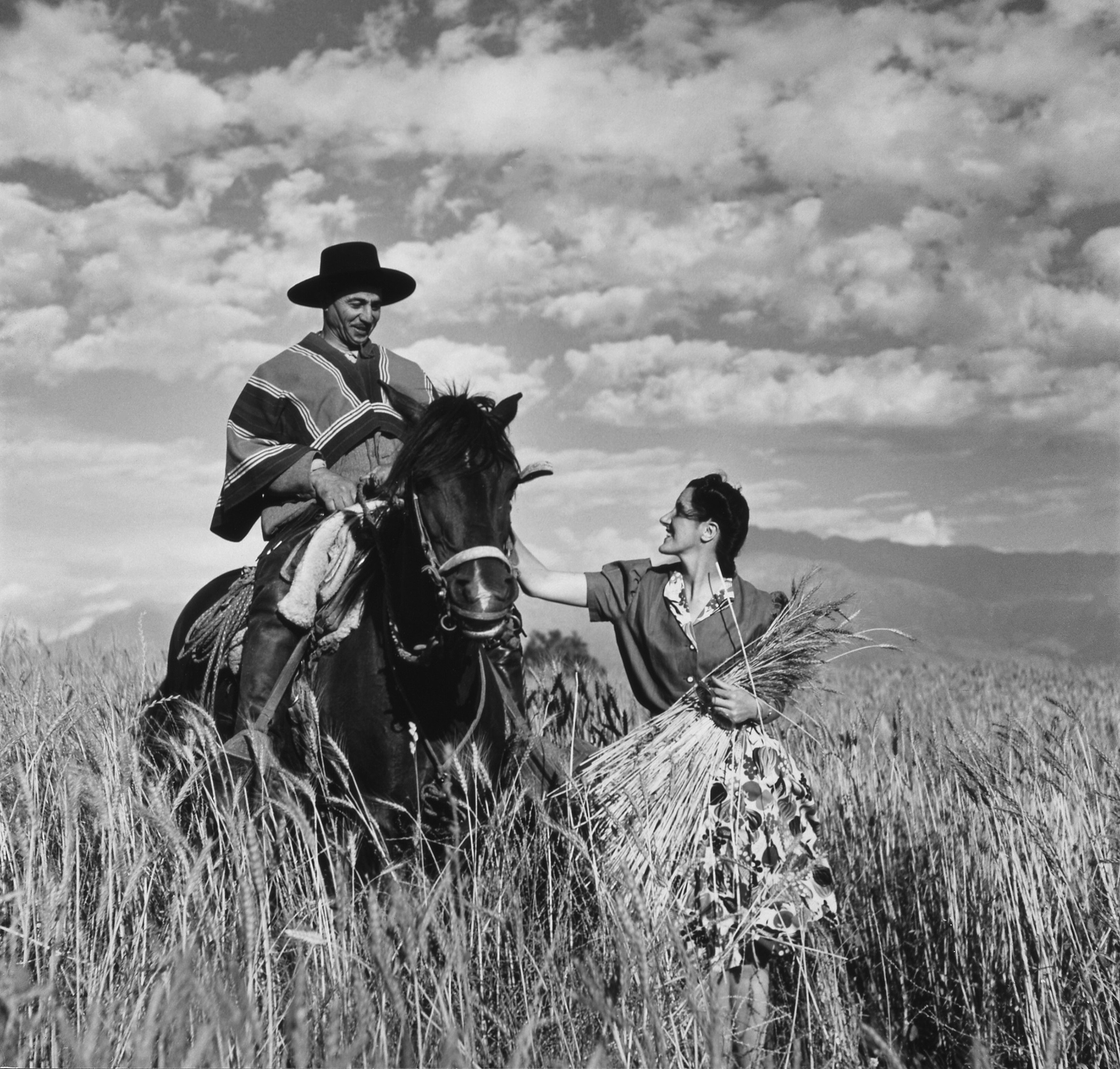
Huaso in a Chilean wheat field, 1940. The picture illustrates some of Chile's two most important agriculture products cattle farming and wheat.

At the time of the arrival of the first Spaniards to Chile the largest indigenous population concentration was in the area spanning from Itata River to Chiloé Archipelago. In this area indigenous groups practised glade agriculture among the forests. The forests provided firewood, fibre and allowed the production of planks. Agriculture type varied; while some Mapuches and Huilliches practised a slash-and-burn type of agriculture some more labour-intensive agriculture is known to have been developed by Mapuches around Budi Lake (raised fields) and the Lumaco and Purén valleys (canalized fields). Pre-Hispanic agriculture extended as far south as the Guaitecas Archipelago (44° S), were indigenous Chonos cultivated Chiloé potatoes. Tools are known to have been relatively simple. In addition the Mapuche and Huilliche economy was complemented with chilihueque raising, fishing, collection of shellfish and algae.

=== Colonial agriculture ===
As the Spanish settled in Chile in the 16th century many cities were founded and indean labour partitioned among Spanish conquistadores. Beyond subsistence the 16th century economy of Chile was oriented towards large-scale production. Spanish colonizers used large amounts of indigenous labour following the slave labour system used in the sugar cane plantations of the Mediterranean islands and Macaronesia. This system of labour successively killed the production base leading to the imposition of the encomienda system by the Spanish Crown in order to prevent excesses. In Chile Spanish settlers managed to continue to exploit indigenous labour under slave like conditions despite the implementation of the encomienda. Rich Spanish settlers had over time to face opposition to their mode of production by Jesuits, Spanish officials and indigenous Mapuches.

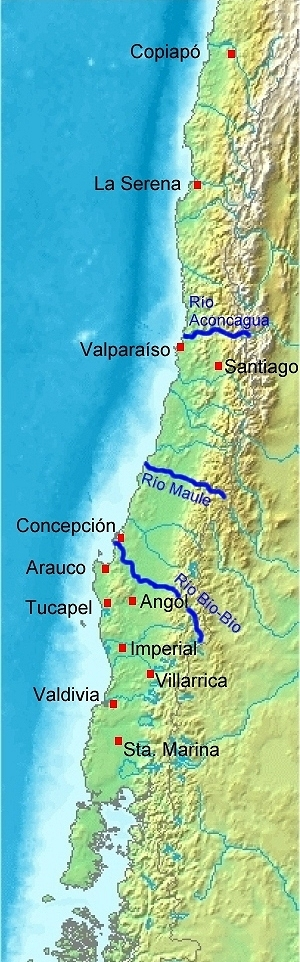
All mainland Spanish settlements (red dots) south of Biobío River were destroyed by 1604.

The initial Spanish settlers of Chiloé Archipelago (conquered in 1567) attempted to base their economy on gold extraction and a "hispanic-mediterranean" agricultural model. This activity ended in a general failure given the unsuitable conditions of the archipelago. Spaniards however reoriented their activities into logging Fitzroya.

The collapse of the Spanish cities in the south following the battle of Curalaba (1598) meant for the Spaniards the loss of both the main gold districts and the largest indigenous labour sources. After those dramatic years the colony of Chile became concentrated in the central valley which became increasingly populated, explored and economically exploited. Following a tendency common in the whole Spanish America haciendas were formed as the economy moved away from mining and into agriculture and husbandry.

In the 17th century economy of the Viceroyalty of Peru, Chile's husbandry and agriculture based economy had a peripheral role, contrasting to ore-rich districts like Potosí and the wealthy city of Lima. Husbandry products made up the bulk of Chilean exports to the rest of the viceroyalty. These products included suet, charqui and leather. This trade made Chilean historian Benjamín Vicuña Mackenna label the 17th century the century of suet (Spanish: Siglo del sebo). Other products exported included dry fruits, mules, wines and minor amounts of copper. Trade with Peru was controlled by merchants from Lima that enjoyed protection by the Spanish authorities in Lima. In addition to the exports to coastal Peru Chile also exported products inland to Upper Peru through the port of Arica. Trade inside Chile was small since cities were tiny and self-sufficient.

In the 1650–1800 period the Chilean lower classes grew considerably in size. To deal with the poor and landless population a policy of founding cities (Note: These cities were often in fact more of villages or towns due to their size.) and granting lands in their surroundings was implemented. From 1730 to 1820 a large number of farmers settled in the outskirts of old cities or formed new cities. Settling as a farmer in the outskirts of old cities (La Serena, Valparaíso, Santiago and Concepción) was overall more popular than joining a new city since it secured a larger consumer market for agricultural products. Chilean haciendas (latifundia) engaged little in the supply of Chilean cities but focused on international exports for revenues.

without Chile, Lima would not exist

— Viceroy José de Armendáriz in 1736

Chile begun exporting cereals to Peru in 1687 when Peru was struck by both an earthquake and a stem rust epidemic. Chilean soil and climatic conditions were better for cereal production than those of Peru and Chilean wheat was cheaper and of better quality than Peruvian wheat. According to historians Villalobos et al. the 1687 events were only the detonant factor for exports to start. The Chilean Central Valley, La Serena and Concepción were the districts that came to be involved in cereal export to Peru. Compared with the 19th century the area cultivated with wheat was very small and production modest.

Initially Chilean latifundia could not meet the wheat demand due to a labour shortage, so had to incorporate temporal workers in addition to the permanent staff. Another response by the latifundia to labour shortages was to act as merchants buying wheat produced by independent farmers or from farmers that hired land. In the period 1700 to 1850 this second option was overall more lucrative.

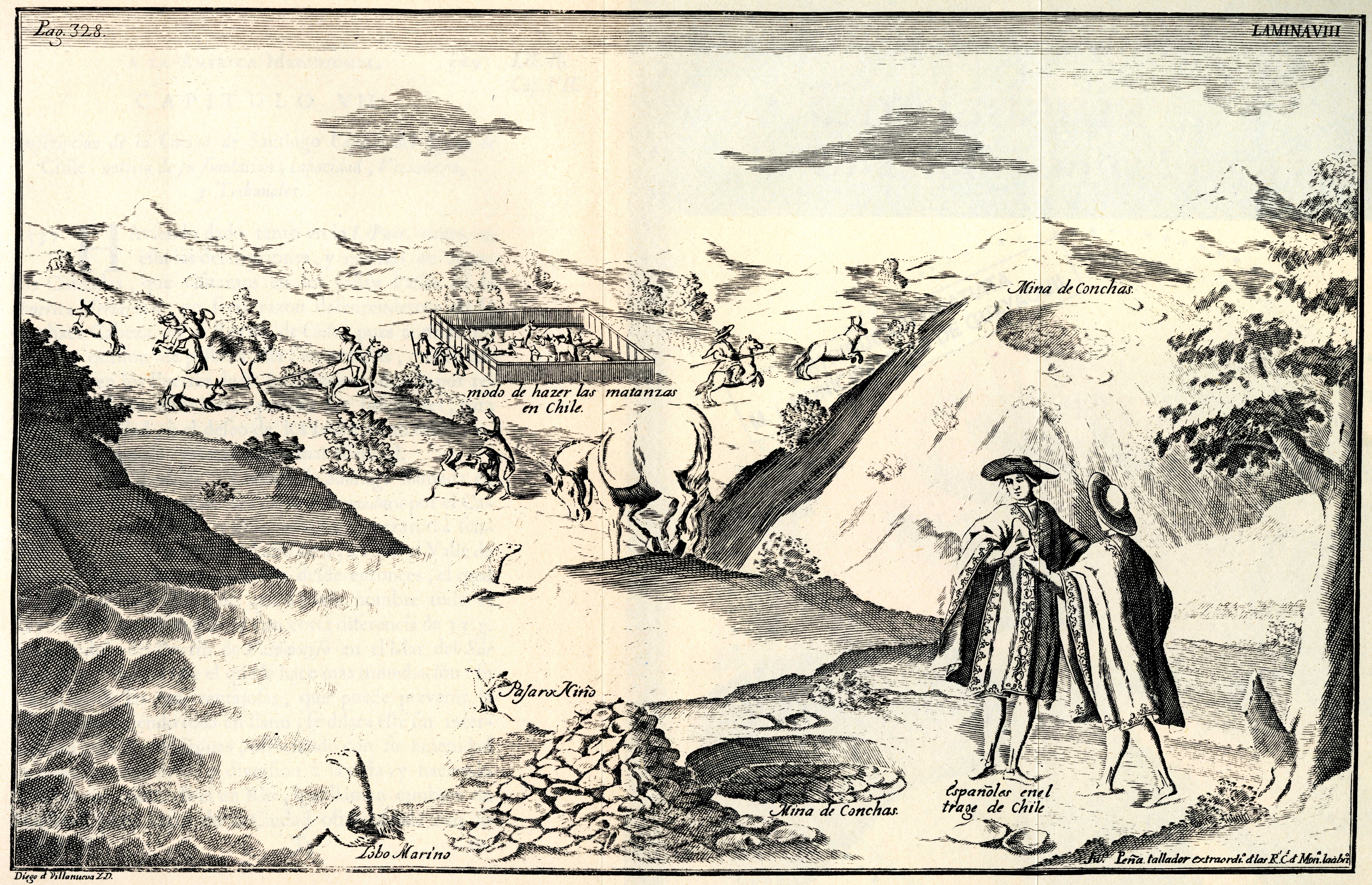
1744 engraving published in Relación histórica del viaje a la América meridional. The image shows cattle in the Chilean countryside including a square for cattle slaughter.

The 1687 Peru earthquake also ended a Peruvian wine-boom as the earthquake destroyed wine cellars and mud containers used for wine storage. The gradual decline of Peruvian wine even caused Peru to import some wine from Chile as it happened in 1795 when Lima imported 5.000 troves (Spanish: botijas) from Concepción in southern Chile. This particular export showed the emergence of Chile relative to Peru as a wine-making region.

=== Early Republican Era ===
The independence wars in Chile (1810–1818) and Peru (1809–1824) had a negative impact on the Chilean economy. Trade was disrupted and armies in Chile pillaged the countryside. The war made commerce a high risk activity and royalist Peru, then the only market for Chilean agricultural products, was closed to commerce with independent Chile. The Guerra a muerte phase was particularly destructive for the Biobío area and ended only to see a period of outlaw banditry (e.g. Pincheira brothers) occur until the late 1820s.

The Chilean silver rush that developed from 1830s onward led a significant impact in agriculture as rich miners invested in the agriculture sector. German immigrants that arrived from 1850 to 1875 pioneered the use of wage labour in agriculture.

In the 19th century, access to the Californian and Australian markets made wheat export a very lucrative activity. In the mid 19th century, these countries experienced large gold rushes which created a large demand for wheat. Chile was at the time the "only wheat producer of some importance in the Pacific". At the same time as the wheat cycle new irrigation canals were built and apiculture and some machines introduced into Chilean agriculture. Apart from that, new markets were explored for Chilean agricultural products. The wheat boom did not last for long; by 1855 California managed to supply itself with wheat and from 1858 onwards it went over to export wheat to Chile. The Australian gold rush of 1851 had the effect of decreasing the labour used in agriculture forcing the colony to import wheat from Chile sustaining Chilean wheat exports whilst the Californian market vanished. After the gold rushes of California and Australia were over these regions begun exporting wheat competing with Chilean wheat forcing from the mid-1860s onwards wheat exports to be shifted to England. Between 1850 and 1875 the area cultivated with wheat and barley for export in Chile rose from 120 to 450 ha. The "cycle" came to an end in the late 1870s due to the increased technification of agriculture in the United States and Argentina plus the competition of Russia and Canada. The end of the wheat cycle added to the already difficult situation that Chilean economy was passing through in the 1870s.

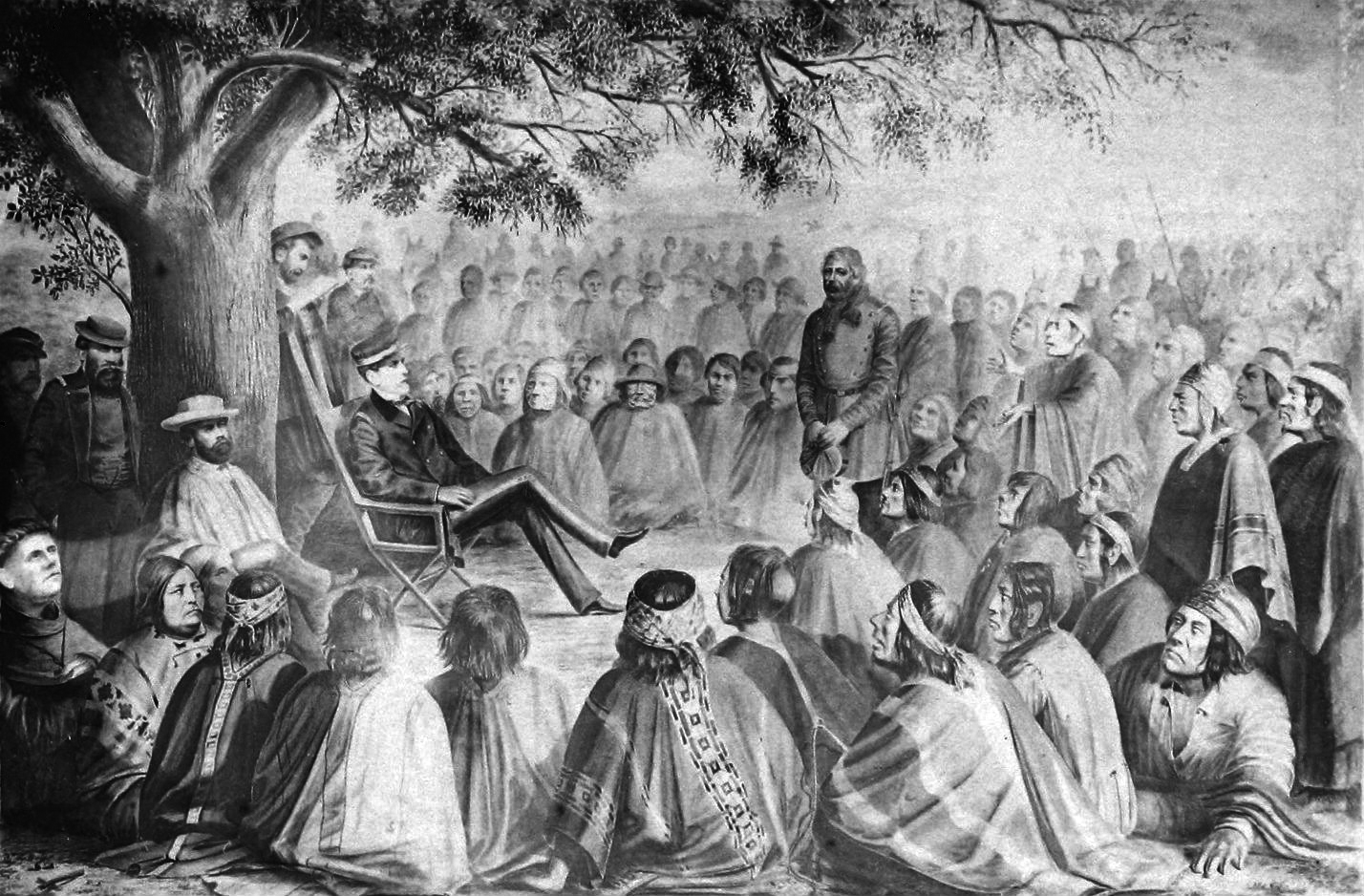
Cornelio Saavedra Rodríguez in a meeting with the main Mapuche loncos of Araucania in 1869. With the Occupation of the Araucanía, that culminated in the 1880s, new lands were made available for non-indigenous agriculture.

Until the mid-19th century more than 80% of Chilean population remained rural working in agriculture or mining and was to a large degree self-sufficient to produce articles of consume.

Starting in 1873, Chile's economy deteriorated. In agriculture this was seen as Chilean wheat exports were outcompeted by production in Canada, Russia, and Argentina. As the victor and possessor of a new coastal territory following the War of the Pacific, Chile benefited by gaining a lucrative territory with significant mineral income. The national treasury grew by 900 percent between 1879 and 1902, due to taxes coming from the newly acquired lands. British involvement and control of the nitrate industry rose significantly, but from 1901 to 1921 Chilean ownership increased from 15% to 51%. The growth of Chilean economy sustained in its saltpetre monopoly meant, compared to the previous growth cycle (1832–1873), that the economy became less diversified and overly dependent on a single natural resource.

The establishment of the Buenos Aires-Mendoza railroad in 1885 ended the lengthy and costly trade with carts that connected these two regions of Argentina and facilitated cattle exports from the pampas to Chile, albeit in the last portion of the route the cattle had to walk over the high mountain passes of the Andes. These imports resulted in a lowering of meat prices in Chile. Sociedad Nacional de la Agricultura (National Agriculture Society), a landowners organization, pushed for a tariff on Argentine cattle and in 1897 the tariff was passed in a bill at the Chilean congress. The unpopular tariff resulted a massive protest in that degenerated into a destructive riot in Santiago in October 1905. Chilean wine exports to Argentina were hampered by the lack of effective land transport and a series of war scares. This situation changed after the Pactos de Mayo were signed in 1902 and the inauguration of the Transandine Railway in 1909, making war unlikely and trade across the Andes easy. Governments agreed to sign a free trade agreement. Argentine winegrowers association, Centro Vitivinícola Nacional, dominated by European immigrants protested vigorously against the free trade agreement since Chilean wines were considered a threat to the local industry. The complaints of Argentine wine growers in conjunction with that of Chilean cattle farmers represented in Sociedad Nacional de la Agricultura ended up tearing down the plans for a free trade agreement.

Tierra del Fuego and much of Magallanes Region did also experienced a fast growth of the sheepherding industry since the 1880s accompanied by colonization of the sparsely populated Patagonian grasslands. In the South-Central Araucanía the Chilean invasion of native Mapuche territory caused the economy of Araucanía to change from being based on sheep and cattle herding to one based on agriculture and wood extraction. The Mapuches' loss of land following the occupation caused severe erosion since Mapuches continued to practice large-scale livestock herding in limited areas.

=== 20th century ===
The 1900–1930 period contributed some of the largest growth of agriculture in the 20th century until the 1980s. Despite this, conditions for rural workers remained harsh, with Tancredo Pinochet denouncing the poor conditions of workers in the hacienda of president Juan Luis Sanfuentes during his presidency (1915–1920). Within a dual sector economic model the Chilean hacienda has been characterized as a prime example of a primitive and rural component. McBride, a British who visited Chile in the 1930s, is reported to have been "astounded" to see haciendas with "agricultural methods that reminds of ancient Egypt, Greece or Palestine."

Starting in 1953 the growth rate of Chilean economy decreased to an annual average of 0.7% but increased to an annual average of 2.4–3.0% in the 1957–1960 period. The decline in the economic growth from 1953 was attributed by some to a neglect of agriculture. The agrarian production in Chile contracted from 1950 onwards. A government plan set up in 1954 to address this ended with meager results and in 1958 a new plan was presented. That plan allowed CORFO to develop investments in dairy plants, refrigerated slaughterhouses, sugar refineries and transport infrastructure.

== See also ==
- Climate of Chile
- Drought in Chile
- Fishing in Chile
- White Earthquake
- Water resources management in Chile
