= History of agriculture in Chile =

Agriculture in Chile has a long history dating back to the Pre-Hispanic period. Indigenous peoples practised varying types of agriculture, from the oases of the Atacama Desert to as far south as the Guaitecas Archipelago (43° S). Potato was the staple food in the populous Mapuche lands. Llama and chilihueque herding was practised by various indigenous groups.

[Chile] is rich in pastures and cultivated fields, in which all kind of animals and plants can be breed or grown, there is plenty of very beautiful wood for making houses, and plenty of firewood, and rich gold mines, and all land is full of them...

— Pedro de Valdivia to Charles V, Holy Roman Emperor

The arrival of the Spanish disrupted local agriculture in many places as indigenous populations shrank and mining rose to prominence. Mapuches in south-central Chile adopted sheep, wheat and the horse from the Spanish. Further south in Chiloé, apple trees and pigs were successfully introduced into the local potato-based agricultural system. With the Spanish expelled from southern regions, central Chile became increasingly populated, with animal husbandry becoming the most prominent agricultural activity in Spanish-ruled areas in the 17th century. In parallel to husbandry, vineyards also grew in importance. Spanish agriculture, centered on the hacienda, absorbed most of the scattered and declining indigenous populations of Central Chile. Much land in Central Chile was cleared with fire during this period. On the contrary, open fields in southern Chile were overgrown as indigenous populations declined due to warfare and diseases introduced by the Spanish.

The 18th century saw the rise of wheat and wine for export to Peru.

Although many agricultural lands were devastated by the independence wars and outlaw banditry, Chilean agriculture recovered fast and new lands were opened up for agriculture. This development, along with other factors, led to a conflict with free Mapuches in Araucanía. With the whole of Araucanía conquered in 1883, the region became known in the following decades as the "granary of Chile". Dispossessed Mapuches were marginalized to small plots or mountainous terrain where their husbandry operations caused severe soil erosion. The intensive monoculture of wheat and logging by Chilean and foreign settlers also contributed to severe erosion. In the far south a sheep farming boom developed at the turn of the century as the Patagonian grasslands became settled.

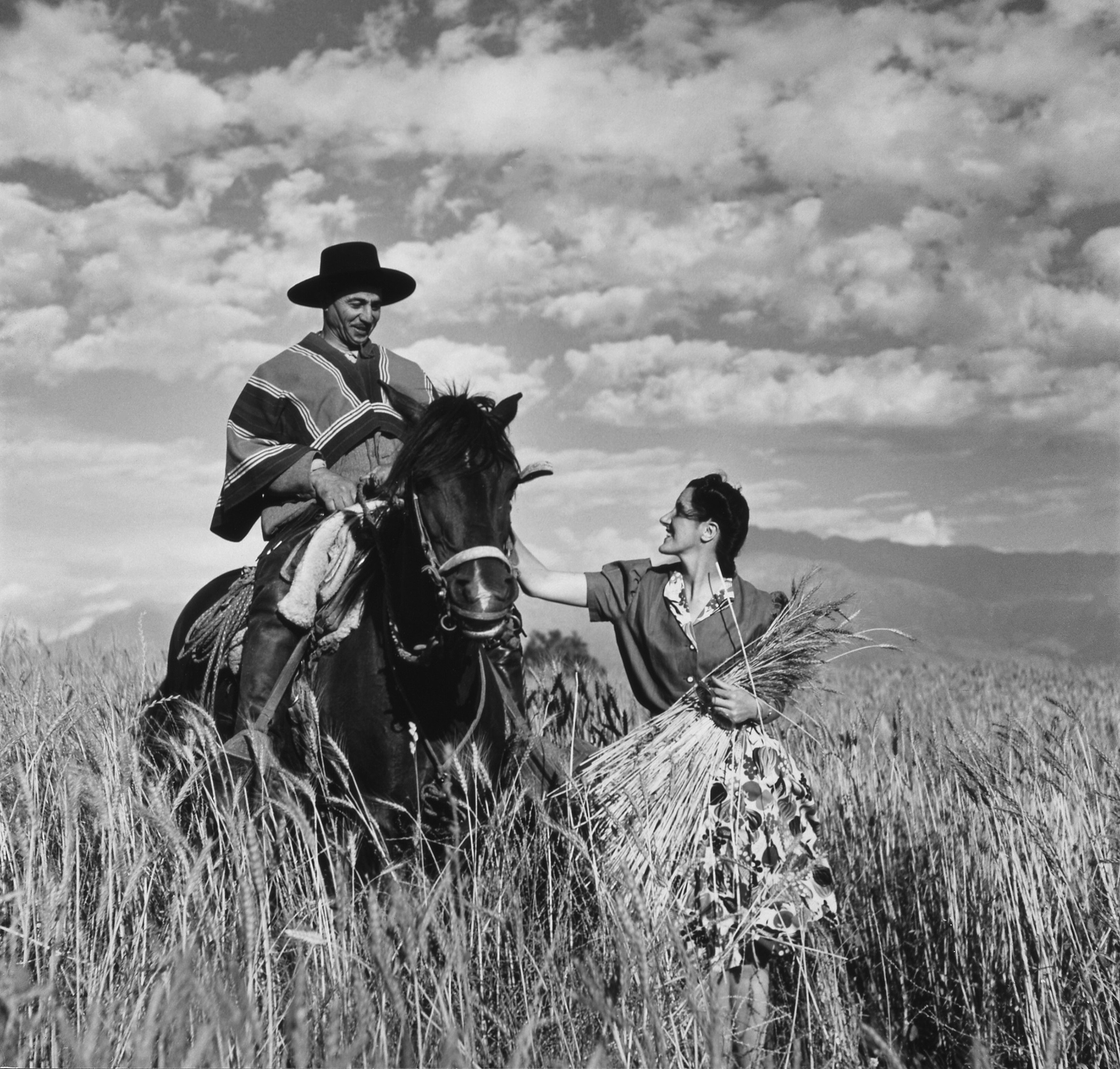
Huaso in a Chilean wheat field, 1940. The picture illustrates two of Chile's historically most important agriculture products; cattle farming and wheat.

Despite the development of irrigation canals, limited introduction of wage labour and apiculture much of Chilean agriculture remained backward in relation to other economic sectors. Inquilinaje, an institution reminiscent of feudalism remained into the 1960s.

As part of a policy of industrialization, the Chilean state invested in dairy plants, refrigerated slaughterhouses, sugar refineries, and transport infrastructure in the late 1950s and early 1960s. The subsequent Chilean land reform brought profound changes to agriculture in the 1960s and 1970s. Large holdings (fundos) were partitioned and land distributed to campesinos and cooperatives. Farmers' unions were legalized and promoted. As the military dictatorship headed by Augusto Pinochet initiated a partial counter-reform in 1973, agriculture became increasingly run by large private enterprises and individuals who concentrated land ownership. Despite a setback during the Crisis of 1982, Chile's agriculture sector expanded in the 1980s, particularly with fruit export.

== Pre-Hispanic agriculture ==
At the time of the arrival of the first Spaniards to Chile the largest indigenous population concentration was in the area spanning from Itata River to Chiloé Archipelago. In this area indigenous groups practised glade agriculture among the forests. The forests provided firewood, fibre and allowed the production of planks. Agriculture type varied; while some Mapuches and Huilliches practised a slash-and-burn type of agriculture some more labour-intensive agriculture is known to have been developed by Mapuches around Budi Lake (raised fields) and the Lumaco and Purén valleys (canalized fields). Pre-Hispanic agriculture extended as far south as the Guaitecas Archipelago (44° S), were indigenous Chonos cultivated Chiloé potatoes. Tools are known to have been relatively simple. In addition the Mapuche and Huilliche economy was complemented with chilihueque raising, fishing, collection of shellfish and algae.

In Valdivia and around Bueno River beans, maize and potatoes are known to have been cultivated in Pre-Hispanic times. Beans were cultivated across Chile, likely as far south as Chiloé Archipelago.

Quinoa is also cultivated since an early date in next to the coast in northern Chile, where was grown by the Chinchorro culture. Ch. quinoa was brought to the lowlands of south-central Chile at an early date from the Andean highlands. Varieties in the lowlands of south-central Chile derive directly from ancestral cultivars which then evolved in parallel to those of the highlands. It has been suggested that the introduction of Ch. quinoa occurred before highland varieties with floury perisperm emerged. There are wide discrepancies in the suggested dates of introduction, one study suggest c. 1000 BC as introduction date while another 600–1100 AD. If the older date is correct the introduction of quinoa to Chile would precede that of maize. In colonial times the quinoa is known to have been cultivated as far south as Chiloé Archipelago and the shores of Nahuel Huapi Lake.

== Colonial agriculture ==
As the Spanish settled in Chile in the 16th century many cities were founded and indean labour partitioned among Spanish conquistadores. Beyond subsistence the 16th century economy of Chile was oriented towards large-scale production. Spanish colonizers used large amounts of indigenous labour following the slave labour system used in the sugar cane plantations of the Mediterranean islands and Macaronesia. This system of labour successively killed the production base leading to the imposition of the encomienda system by the Spanish Crown in order to prevent excesses. In Chile Spanish settlers managed to continue to exploit indigenous labour under slave like conditions despite the implementation of the encomienda. Rich Spanish settlers had over time to face opposition to their mode of production by Jesuits, Spanish officials and indigenous Mapuches.

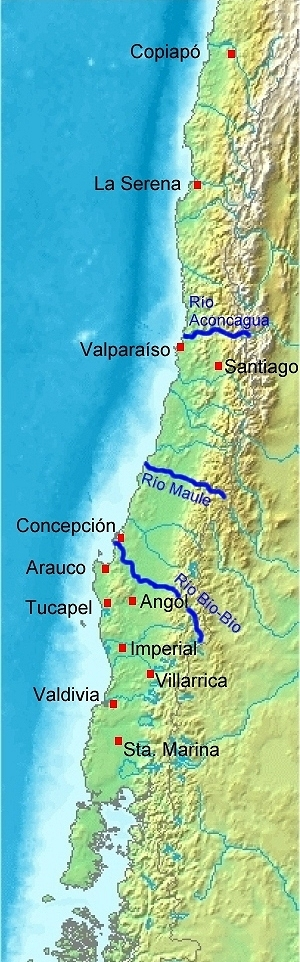
All mainland Spanish settlements (red dots) south of Biobío River were destroyed by 1604.

The initial Spanish settlers of Chiloé Archipelago (conquered in 1567) attempted to base their economy on gold extraction and a "hispanic-mediterranean" agricultural model. This activity ended in a general failure given the unsuitable conditions of the archipelago. Spaniards however reoriented their activities into logging Fitzroya.

The collapse of the Spanish cities in the south following the battle of Curalaba (1598) meant for the Spaniards the loss of both the main gold districts and the largest indigenous labour sources. After those dramatic years the colony of Chile became concentrated in the central valley which became increasingly populated, explored and economically exploited. Following a tendency common in the whole Spanish America haciendas were formed as the economy moved away from mining and into agriculture and husbandry.

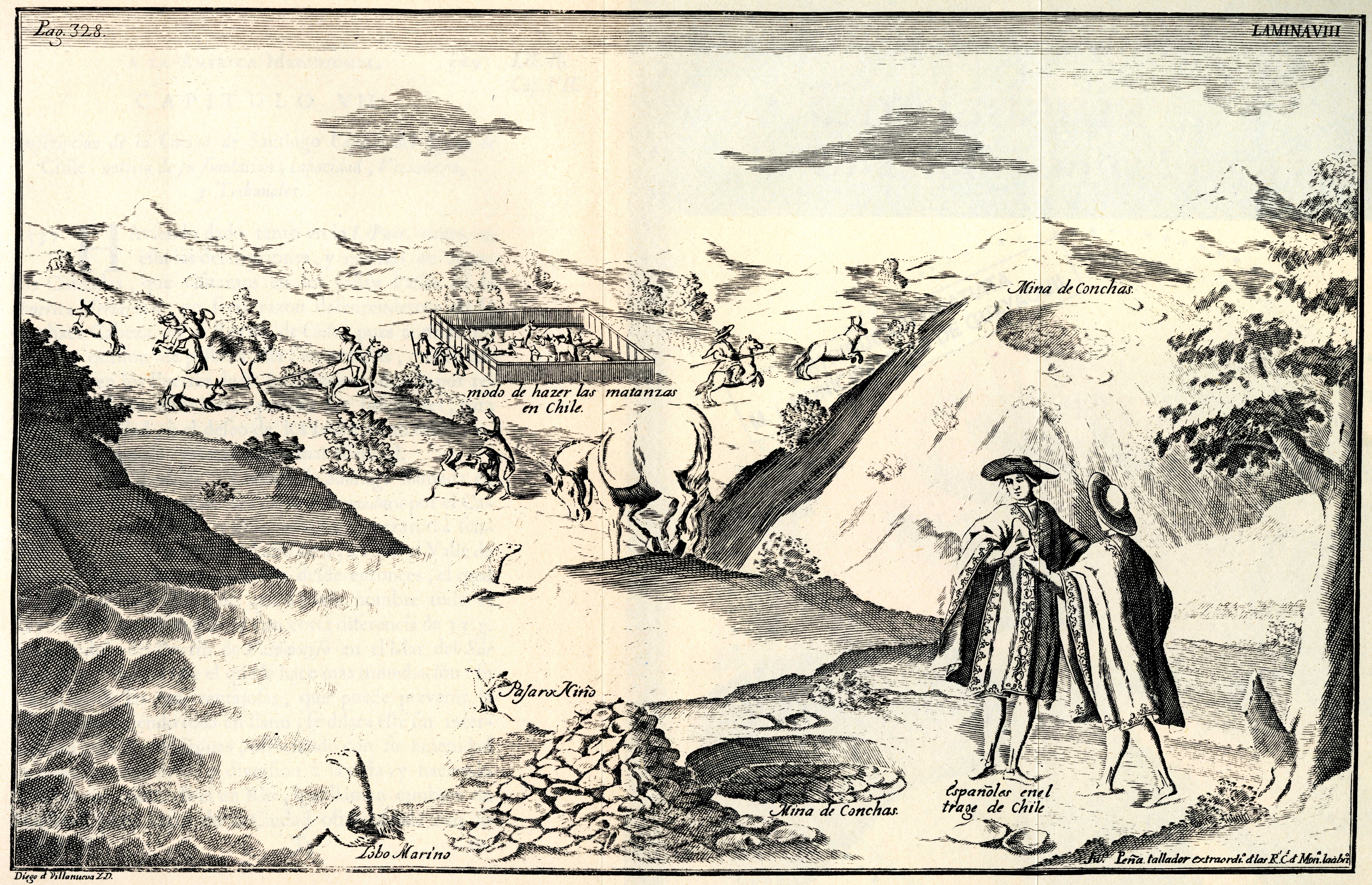
1744 engraving published in Relación histórica del viaje a la América meridional. The image shows cattle in the Chilean countryside including a square for cattle slaughter.

In the 17th century economy of the Viceroyalty of Peru, Chile's husbandry and agriculture based economy had a peripheral role, contrasting to ore-rich districts like Potosí and the wealthy city of Lima. Husbandry products made up the bulk of Chilean exports to the rest of the viceroyalty. These products included suet, charqui and leather. This trade made Chilean historian Benjamín Vicuña Mackenna label the 17th century the century of suet (Spanish: Siglo del sebo). Other products exported included dry fruits, mules, wines and minor amounts of copper. Trade with Peru was controlled by merchants from Lima that enjoyed protection by the Spanish authorities in Lima. In addition to the exports to coastal Peru Chile also exported products inland to Upper Peru through the port of Arica. Trade inside Chile was small since cities were tiny and self-sufficient.

In the 1650–1800 period the Chilean lower classes grew considerably in size. To deal with the poor and landless population a policy of founding cities (Note: These cities were often in fact more of villages or towns due to their size.) and granting lands in their surroundings was implemented. From 1730 to 1820 a large number of farmers settled in the outskirts of old cities or formed new cities. Settling as a farmer in the outskirts of old cities (La Serena, Valparaíso, Santiago and Concepción) was overall more popular than joining a new city since it secured a larger consumer market for agricultural products. Chilean haciendas (latifundia) engaged little in the supply of Chilean cities but focused on international exports for revenues.

without Chile, Lima would not exist

— Viceroy José de Armendáriz in 1736

Chile begun exporting cereals to Peru in 1687 when Peru was struck by both an earthquake and a stem rust epidemic. Chilean soil and climatic conditions were better for cereal production than those of Peru and Chilean wheat was cheaper and of better quality than Peruvian wheat. According to historians Villalobos et al. the 1687 events were only the detonant factor for exports to start. The Chilean Central Valley, La Serena and Concepción were the districts that came to be involved in cereal export to Peru. Compared to the 19th century the area cultivated with wheat was very small and production modest.

Initially Chilean latifundia could not meet the wheat demand due to a labour shortage, so had to incorporate temporal workers in addition to the permanent staff. Another response by the latifundia to labour shortages was to act as merchants buying wheat produced by independent farmers or from farmers that hired land. In the period 1700 to 1850 this second option was overall more lucrative.

The 1687 Peru earthquake also ended a Peruvian wine-boom as the earthquake destroyed wine cellars and mud containers used for wine storage. The gradual decline of Peruvian wine even caused Peru to import some wine from Chile as it happened in 1795 when Lima imported 5.000 troves (Spanish: botijas) from Concepción in southern Chile. This particular export showed the emergence of Chile relative to Peru as a wine-making region.

== Early Republican Era ==
The independence wars in Chile (1810–1818) and Peru (1809–1824) had a negative impact on the Chilean economy. Trade was disrupted and armies in Chile pillaged the countryside. The war made commerce a high risk activity and royalist Peru, then the only market for Chilean agricultural products, was closed to commerce with independent Chile. The Guerra a muerte phase was particularly destructive for the Biobío area and ended only to see a period of outlaw banditry (e.g. Pincheira brothers) occur until the late 1820s.

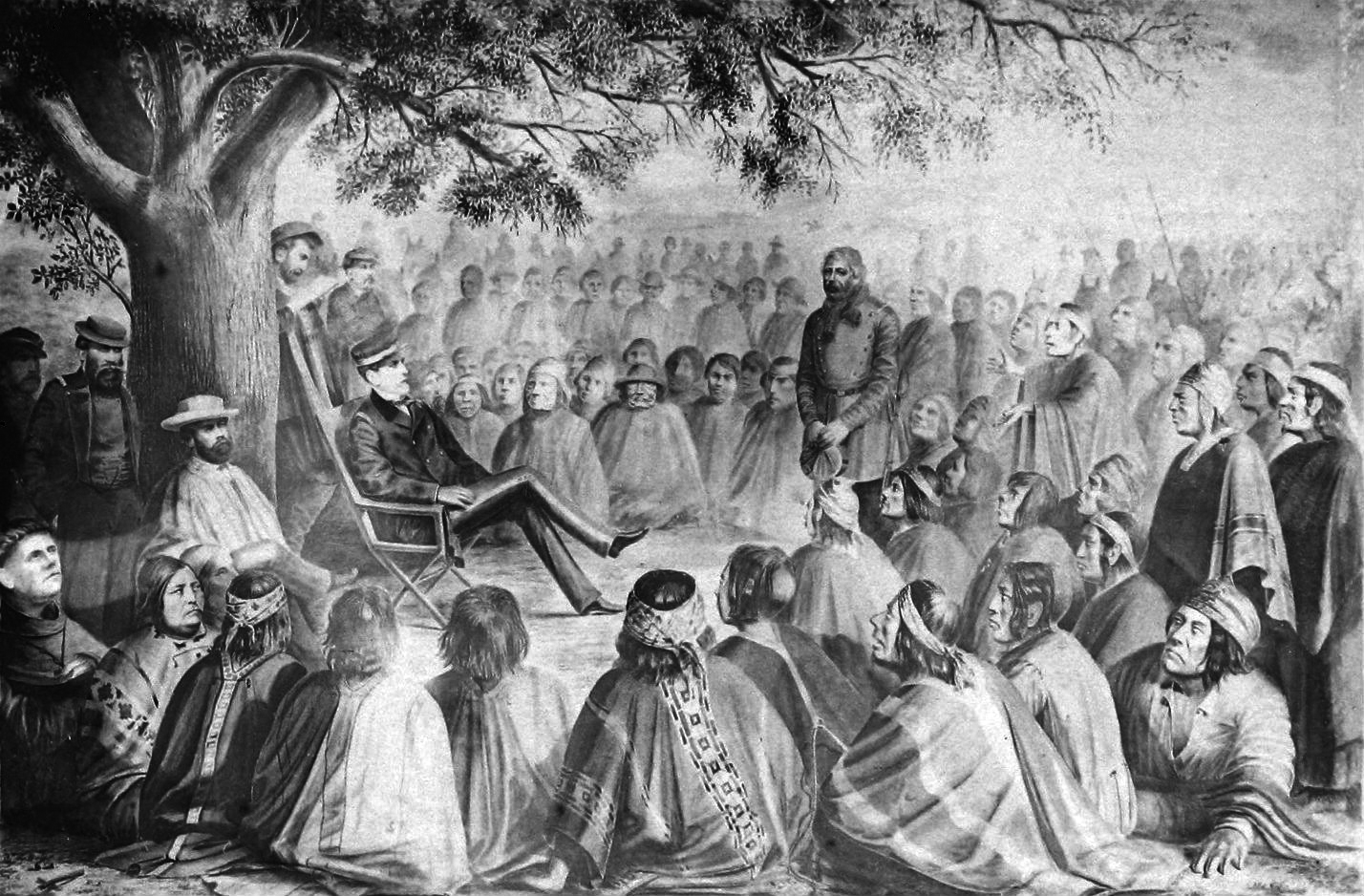
Cornelio Saavedra Rodríguez in a meeting with the main Mapuche loncos of Araucania in 1869. With the Occupation of the Araucanía, that culminated in the 1880s, new lands were made available for non-indigenous agriculture.

The Chilean silver rush that developed from 1830s onward led a significant impact in agriculture as rich miners invested in the agriculture sector. German immigrants that arrived from 1850 to 1875 pioneered the use of wage labour in agriculture. In the 19th century, access to the Californian and Australian markets made wheat export a very lucrative activity. In the mid 19th century, these countries experienced large gold rushes which created a large demand for wheat. Chile was at the time the "only wheat producer of some importance in the Pacific". At the same time as the wheat cycle new irrigation canals were built and apiculture and some machines introduced into Chilean agriculture. Apart from that, new markets were explored for Chilean agricultural products. The wheat boom did not last for long; by 1855 California managed to supply itself with wheat and from 1858 onwards it went over to export wheat to Chile. The Australian gold rush of 1851 had the effect of decreasing the labour used in agriculture forcing the colony to import wheat from Chile sustaining Chilean wheat exports whilst the Californian market vanished. After the gold rushes of California and Australia were over these regions begun exporting wheat competing with Chilean wheat forcing from the mid-1860s onwards wheat exports to be shifted to England. Between 1850 and 1875 the area cultivated with wheat and barley for export in Chile rose from 120 to 450 ha. The "cycle" came to an end in the late 1870s due to the increased technification of agriculture in the United States and Argentina plus the competition of Russia and Canada. The end of the wheat cycle added to the already difficult situation that Chilean economy was passing through in the 1870s.

Until the mid-19th century more than 80% of Chilean population remained rural working in agriculture or mining and was to a large degree self-sufficient to produce articles of consume.

Starting in 1873, Chile's economy deteriorated. In agriculture this was seen as Chilean wheat exports were outcompeted by production in Canada, Russia, and Argentina. As the victor and possessor of a new coastal territory following the War of the Pacific, Chile benefited by gaining a lucrative territory with significant mineral income. The national treasury grew by 900 percent between 1879 and 1902, due to taxes coming from the newly acquired lands. British involvement and control of the nitrate industry rose significantly, but from 1901 to 1921 Chilean ownership increased from 15% to 51%. The growth of Chilean economy sustained in its saltpetre monopoly meant, compared to the previous growth cycle (1832–1873), that the economy became less diversified and overly dependent on a single natural resource.

The establishment of the Buenos Aires-Mendoza railroad in 1885 ended the lengthy and costly trade with carts that connected these two regions of Argentina and facilitated cattle exports from the pampas to Chile, albeit in the last portion of the route the cattle had to walk over the high mountain passes of the Andes. These imports resulted in a lowering of meat prices in Chile. Sociedad Nacional de la Agricultura (National Agriculture Society), a landowners organization, pushed for a tariff on Argentine cattle and in 1897 the tariff was passed in a bill at the Chilean congress. The unpopular tariff resulted a massive protest in that degenerated into a destructive riot in Santiago in October 1905. Chilean wine exports to Argentina were hampered by the lack of effective land transport and a series of war scares. This situation changed after the Pactos de Mayo were signed in 1902 and the inauguration of the Transandine Railway in 1909, making war unlikely and trade across the Andes easy. Governments agreed to sign a free trade agreement. Argentine winegrowers association, Centro Vitivinícola Nacional, dominated by European immigrants protested vigorously against the free trade agreement since Chilean wines were considered a threat to the local industry. The complaints of Argentine wine growers in conjunction with that of Chilean cattle farmers represented in Sociedad Nacional de la Agricultura ended up tearing down the plans for a free trade agreement.

Tierra del Fuego and much of Magallanes Region did also experienced a fast growth of the sheepherding industry since the 1880s accompanied by colonization of the sparsely populated Patagonian grasslands. In the South-Central Araucanía the Chilean invasion of native Mapuche territory caused the economy of Araucanía to change from being based on sheep and cattle herding to one based on agriculture and wood extraction. The Mapuches' loss of land following the occupation caused severe erosion since Mapuches continued to practice large-scale livestock herding in limited areas.

== 20th century ==
The 1900–1930 period was the one of largest growths of agriculture in the 20th century until the 1980s. Despite this, conditions for rural workers remained harsh with Tancredo Pinochet denouncing the poor conditions of workers in the hacienda of president Juan Luis Sanfuentes during his presidency (1915–1920). Within a dual sector economic model the Chilean hacienda has been characterized as a prime example of a primitive and rural component. McBride, a British who visited Chile in the 1930s, is reported to have been "astounded" to see haciendas with "agricultural methods that reminds of ancient Egypt, Greece or Palestine."

Starting in 1953 the growth rate of Chilean economy decreased to an annual average of 0.7% but increased to an annual average of 2.4–3.0% in the 1957–1960 period. The decline in the economic growth from 1953 was attributed by some to a neglect of agriculture. The agrarian production in Chile contracted from 1950 onwards. A government plan set up in 1954 to address this ended with meager results and in 1958 a new plan was presented. That plan allowed CORFO to develop investments in dairy plants, refrigerated slaughterhouses, sugar refineries and transport infrastructure.

== See also ==
- Aquaculture in Chile
- Chilean wine
- Climate of Chile
- Drought in Chile
- Fishing in Chile
- Forestry in Chile
- White Earthquake
- Water resources management in Chile

== Bibliography ==
- Bengoa, José (2000). Historia del pueblo mapuche: Siglos XIX y XX (in Spanish) (Seventh ed.). LOM ediciones. ISBN 956-282-232-X.
- Guarda, Gabriel (1973). La economía de Chile Austral antes de la colonización alemana. Valdivia: Universidad Austral de Chile.
- Otero, Luis (2006). La huella del fuego: Historia de los bosques nativos. Poblamiento y cambios en el paisaje del sur de Chile. Pehuén Editores. ISBN 956-16-0409-4.
- Salazar, Gabriel (1985). Labradores, Peones y Proletarios (3rd ed.). LOM Ediciones. ISBN 956-282-269-9.
- Salazar, Gabriel; Pinto, Julio (2002). Historia contemporánea de Chile III. La economía: mercados empresarios y trabajadores. LOM Ediciones. ISBN 956-282-172-2.
- Villalobos, Sergio; Silva, Osvaldo; Silva, Fernando; Estelle, Patricio (1974). Historia De Chile (14th ed.). Editorial Universitaria. ISBN 956-11-1163-2.
- Bulnes, Gonzalo (1920). Chile and Peru: the causes of the war of 1879. Santiago, Chile: Imprenta Universitaria.
- Sater, William F. (2007). Andean Tragedy: Fighting the War of the Pacific, 1879–1884. Lincoln and London: University of Nebraska Press. ISBN 978-0-8032-4334-7.
- Farcau, Bruce W. (2000). The Ten Cents War, Chile, Peru and Bolivia in the War of the Pacific, 1879–1884. Westport, Connecticut, London: Praeger Publishers. ISBN 978-0-275-96925-7.
- Pardo, Oriana; Pizarro, José Luis (2015). Chile: Plantas alimentarias Prehispánicas (in Spanish). Arica, Chile: Ediciones Parina. ISBN 9789569120022.
