= Killing of Camilo Catrillanca =

2018 shooting of a Chilean rights activist

Camilo Catrillanca
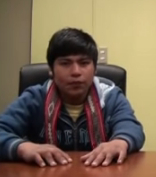
- Camilo Catrillanca (in 2011)
- Born: Camilo Marcelo Catrillanca Marín; September 13, 1994; Victoria, Chile
- Died: November 14, 2018 (aged 24); Temucuicui, Chile
- Cause of death: Firearm wound
- Occupations: Farmer, Mapuche activist
- Children: 2

Camilo Marcelo Catrillanca Marín (13 September 1994 – 14 November 2018) was a Mapuche farmer from Temucuicui in Chile who was shot to death by the Chilean police force under suspicious circumstances. The incident led to protests against police violence, and occurred in the broader context of the ongoing conflict over Mapuche civil rights.

== Biography ==
Camilo Catrillanca was a grandson of the former Mapuche chief Juan Catrillanca and son of Marcelo Catrillanca, the president of the "Ignacio Queipul Millanao" Mapuche community.

He was a leader of the student movement in the Liceo de Pailahueque and worked for the reclamation of Mapuche lands in Ercilla, in the Chilean region of La Araucanía. In 2011, he led a protest by a group of high school students in Ercilla, which ended 13 days later, after reaching an agreement to create an intercultural high school and to increase scholarships.

At the time of his death he had a 6-year-old daughter, and his wife was pregnant.

== Death ==
Catrillanca was killed by a shot he received in the head on November 14, 2018, in Temucuicui, a Mapuche community located in Ercilla, located in the Araucanía Region of Southern Chile, during an operation carried out by a unit of the Special Police Operations Group of Carabineros called the "Tactical Reaction Group", and known in the press as the "Jungle Commando". Catrillanca was riding with a 15-year-old teenager on a tractor when he was shot in the back of the neck by Jungle Commando squad member who suspected the two of involvement with car theft among others.

The teenager who was traveling next to Catrillanca, identified by the initials MACP, who was the primary witness of his death, was arrested along with three other people by the Carabineros, but his arrest was declared to have been illegal, and he was released. MACP reported he had been severely beaten by police during the arrest.

The National Institute of Human Rights announced a criminal complaint for the torture to which MACP had been subjected during his detention.

=== Conflicting versions of events ===
The police report stated that the shooting occurred as the carabineros were investigating the theft of three teachers' cars from the Santa Rosa School of Ancapi Ñancucheo, in Ercilla. After a chase, the carabineros managed to recover two vehicles. Both the police and the government said that Catrillanca was involved with the crime. The community of Temucuicui denied this version, stating that the "Jungle Commandos" entered the town firing bursts of bullets, without provocation, and that the Human Rights Unit of the La Araucanía Public Prosecutor's Office announced it would investigate the facts of the case.

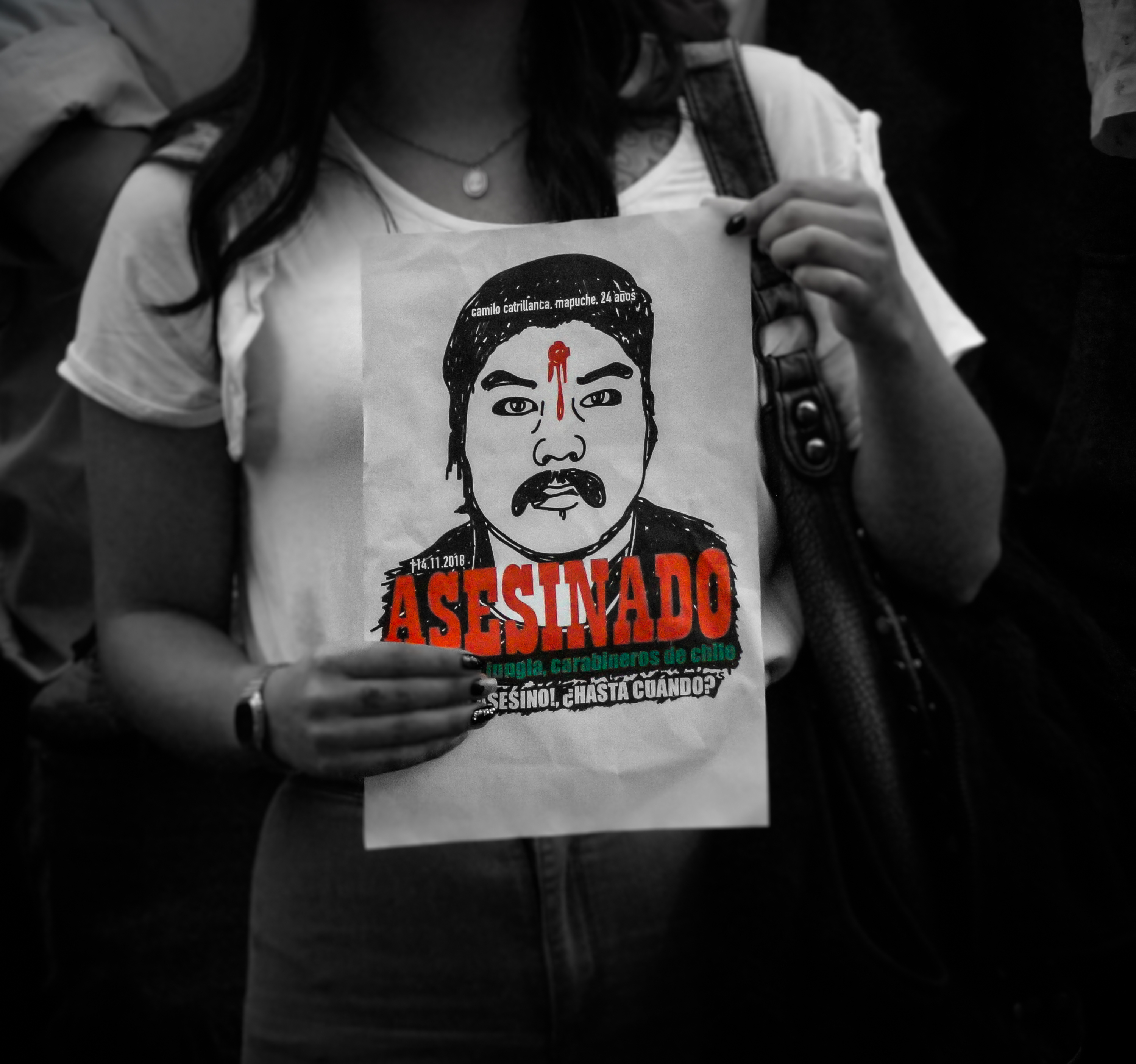
Catrillanca has become an icon for resistance against police brutality in Chile. The sign's text says "asesinado", the Spanish word for "assassinated".

The mayor of La Araucanía, Luis Mayol, said on 14 November that Catrillanca "had a history of receiving stolen vehicles". On 16 November, Congresswoman Pamela Jiles published Catrillanca's background sheet, which indicated that he had no criminal record. Interior Minister Andrés Chadwick said that Catrillanca did have a police record, though not a criminal record, and that he had been arrested on October 22, 2018, for receiving stolen property, but that he had not been convicted.

The Carabineros asserted on 17 November that the events had not been recorded by its officers, but the following day the government announced that Catrillanca's death was recorded on video, but that said recordings had been destroyed by Carabineros. It was also announced that four carabineros had been dismissed, and that two high-ranking officers had resigned; La Araucanía mayor Luis Mayol also subsequently resigned.

Two police videos of Catrillanca's death were found in December 2018, and they show that Catrillanca was unarmed, conflicting with previous assertions by the officers involved. Following this revelation, Chilean president Sebastián Piñera forced the resignation of the national police chief, Hermes Soto, as well as ten other police commanders.

=== Responses to his death ===
Catrillanca's death led to protests and demonstrations in Santiago and other cities. Opposition leaders and rights groups called for the dismantling of the Jungle Commando units and the resignation of Interior Minister Andrés Chadwick.

Amnesty International described the killing as "outrageous and alarming".

=== Investigations ===
Interior Minister Chadwick and his undersecretary, Rodrigo Ubilla, were summoned to testify before the congressional human rights commission and the state attorney general to answer questions both about Catrillanca's case itself and about police obstruction in the investigation. Jungle Commando leader Manuel Valdivieso resigned after he was accused of lying about the case and forcing those in his command to lie as well. Carlos Alarcon, the main suspect in Catrillanca's killing, testified that Valdivieso and a lawyer forced him and others to lie about the attack, saying that Catrillanca was attacking them with firearms and that there was no body camera footage of the events.

== See also ==
- Death of Francisco Martínez
- Eye injury in the 2019–2020 Chilean protests
