= Cuneyd Zapsu =

Turkish businessmen of Kurdish descent

- Born: 19 November 1956 (age 70); Istanbul, Turkey
- Citizenship: Turkish, German
- Education: Istanbul University, LMU Munich
- Occupation: Businessman
- Political party: Justice and Development Party
- Spouse: Beyza Zapsu

Hasan Cuneyd Zapsu (born 19 November 1956 in İstanbul) is a Kurdish businessman from Turkey. He was a co-founder of the Justice and Development Party (AKP) in Turkey as well as the founder of Balsu, one of the world's leading hazelnut producers.

== Early life and education ==
Zapsu was born in Istanbul. He is a descendant of Bedir Khan Beg and Kurdish poet Abdurrahim Rahmi Zapsu. After the Turkish coup d'état of 1960, his family had to leave Turkey because his father was a politician in the governing Democrat Party. They relocated to Munich, Germany, where he attended primary school. They returned to Istanbul in the second half of the 1960s, and he studied at Istanbul's German High School. After his graduation, he studied business administration at the Istanbul University and later economics at LMU Munich.

== Career ==
=== Balsu ===
In 1977 he launched his business career and held various positions in the companies his family owned. He founded Balsu, which would go on to become a leading hazelnut exporter in 1978. He was the President of the Association of Exporters of Istanbul between 1987 and 2001 and was a founder of several hazelnut-related associations. In 1995 Zapsu and his brother Aziz co-founded the Turkish discount store chain BiM. He sold his shares to Merrill Lynch in 2000.

=== Yasin Kadi controversy ===
The Zapsu brothers business relations with Saudi entrepreneur Yasin Kadi brought them under the attention of Turkish authorities, as Kadi was on the financiers of terror list of the United Nations. Cuneyd Zapsu and his mother had also donated $300,000 to the charity Mufaqaf in 1990s, which was closely related to Yasin Kadi and had been classified as to be connected to Al Qaeda by the United States following the September 11 attacks in New York. Zapsu denied any irregularities in their business relations and Guy Martin, Kadi's lawyer, stated that no UN sanctions were breached with the transactions in question. Today Yasin Kadi has been cleared of all allegations.

=== Political career ===
In 2001, he resigned from his businesses and became a founding member of the AKP. He never was a candidate to parliament, but was an important adviser to Recep Tayyip Erdoğan and often the sole translator in meetings Erdoğan held with Western politicians. At that time he was mentioned as the "shadow foreign minister“. Since 2002, he has accompanied Erdoğan to the World Economic Forum (WEF) in Davos of which he is also a member. In 2003 he supported a political solution to the conflict of Cyprus and advised Kurdish rebels to demand their rights in a political way as the laws in 2003 were much better than before.

=== Return to business ===
He resigned as advisor to Erdoğan in 2008 and founded the Cuneyd Zapsu Consultancy Inc. which serves as an advisor to various global and Turkish enterprises. He has also returned to the hazelnut processor and exporter Balsu. He serves as a senior advisor to Coca-Cola since 2012 and in May 2017, he was appointed a member of the board to the company in charge of the construction of the Akkuyu Nuclear Power Plant. Since 1986, he is also a member of the Turkish Industry and Business Association (TÜSAID) and serves as a member of the executive committee for the International Nut and Dried Fruit Council (INC) since 2007.

== Personal life ==
Zapsu resides in Istanbul. He is married to Beyza Zapsu and is the father of three children. Through his paternal aunt, he is related to Musa Anter.
