= Forestry in Chile =

Economic sector of Chile

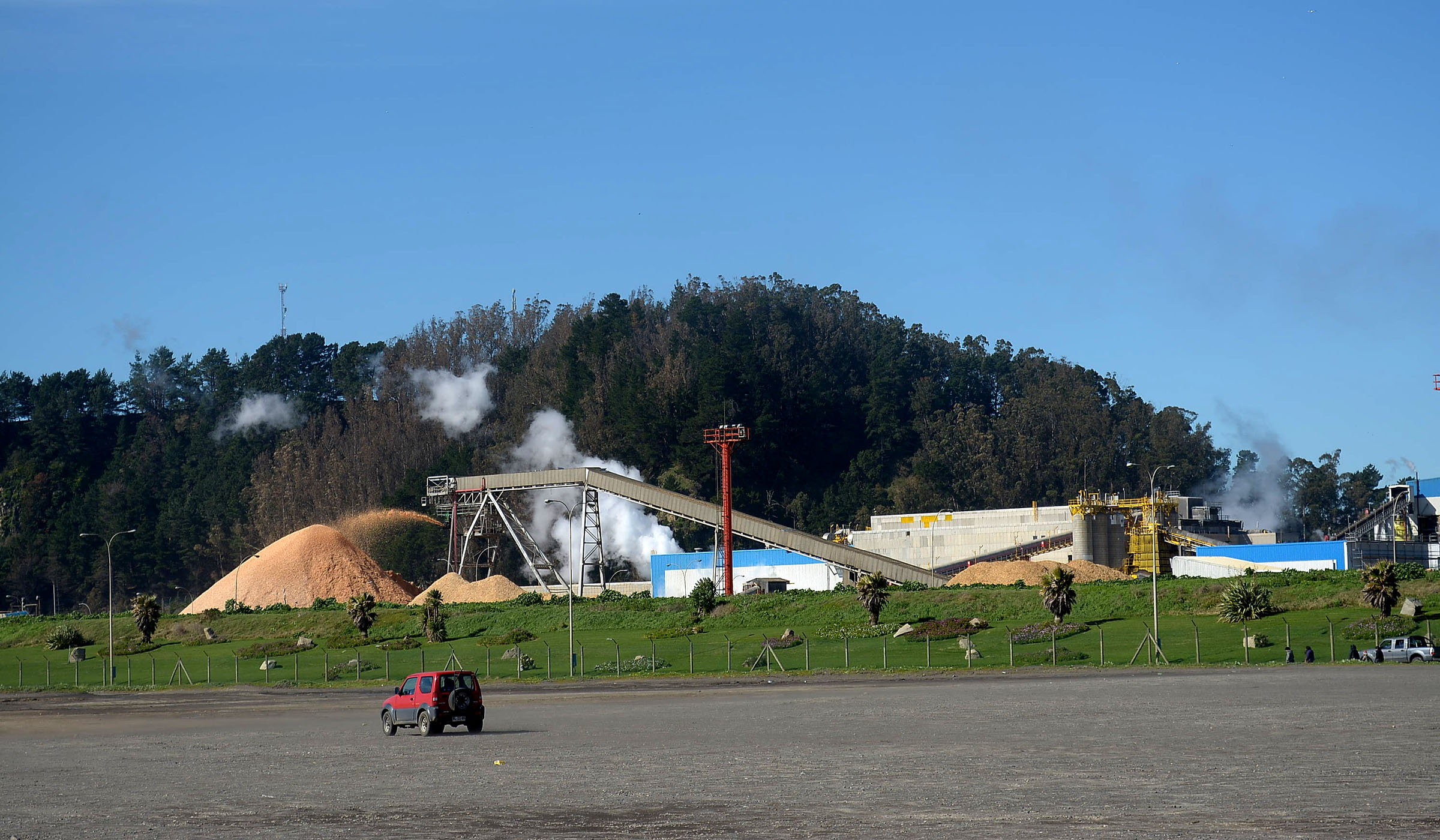
Pile of wood chips at Constitución.

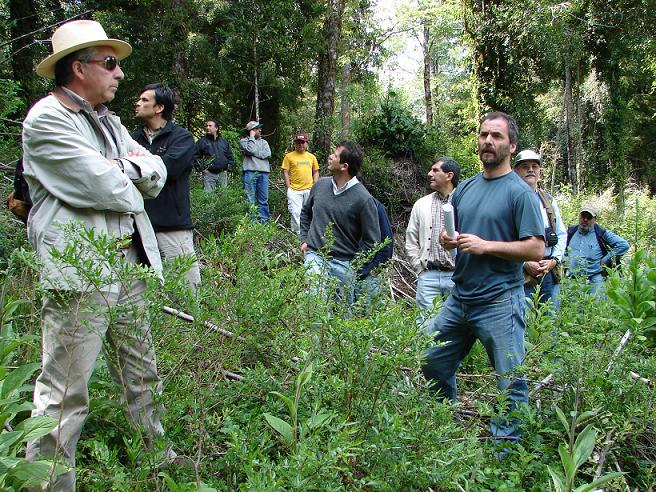
Foresters of the Austral University of Chile in the forests of San Pablo de Tregua

Forestry is one of the main economic sectors of Chile, representing 14% of the value of the country's total exports. This places the forestry sector in Chile as the second largest export sector behind copper mining. From 1970 to 2005 planted forest surface in Chile grew from 300,000 ha to more than 2.07 million ha. In 2019 Chile had slightly more than 2,3 million ha of forest plantations of which 1,3 million ha were Pinus radiata and 0,9 million ha were of Eucalyptus globulus and Eucalyptus nitens. In 2006 70% of Chile's forestry production went to export, and the industry employed more than 150,000 workers. By 2020 people employed in the sector were down to 112,200.

The wave of forest plantations that begun in the 1970s was initially a response to severe soil erosion that affected much of the country. There was a broad support for plantations when these were first implemented but by the 1980s a conservationist critique had grown exposing the adverse effects of plantations on certain plant and animal species, on biodiversity and on water resources. In many cases the establishment of plantations meant not reforestation but the replacement of existing forests with plantations.

The growth of the forestry sector since the 1980s is the consequence of growth of the export-oriented economy in Chile. Critics argue it has created an enclave economy. In the area of Cañete and Tirúa forestry companies have been accused of contributing to the displacement of indigenous Mapuche communities. In the last decades the communities of Temucuicui have had a conflict, at times physically violent, with the forestry company Forestal Mininco, leading to the detention and imprisonment of community members in the prisons of Angol and Cañete.

== See also ==
- Native Forest Law
- Celulosa Arauco y Constitución
- Mapuche conflict
- Deforestation in Chile
