= Balsu =

Hazelnut producer from Turkey

- Traded as: Balsu Gıda Sanayi ve Ticaret A.S.
- Founded: 1979
- Founder: Cuneyd Zapsu
- Headquarters: Istanbul, Turkey
- Area served: Worldwide
- Products: Hazelnuts
- Revenue: 372 million USD (2024)

Balsu Gida Sanayi ve Ticaret A.S. is a producer, processor and exporter of hazelnuts and its derivatives. Its headquarters is located in Istanbul's Beykoz district.

== History ==
Its history dates back to 1979, when its founder Cuneyd Zapsu established a company which supplied hazelnuts from Turkey to international markets. The modern company was founded in 1985 as a privately held business based in Istanbul. Balsu is reaching global markets through its affiliates: Balsu Europe GmbH in Germany, Balsu USA Inc in Portland USA; and Balsu Asia in Hong-Kong.

== Production ==
Today the company is one of the main hazelnut producers in Turkey. Its factory in Sakarya is able to process about 55,000 tons of hazelnuts annually. It is also a leading exporter of hazelnuts to the global market. Its client companies include Ritter Sport, Ferrero and Nestlé. Balsu created a program to enhance the labor standards in the hazelnut industry in Turkey together with Nestlé and Olam International.
