= Hazelnut production in Turkey =

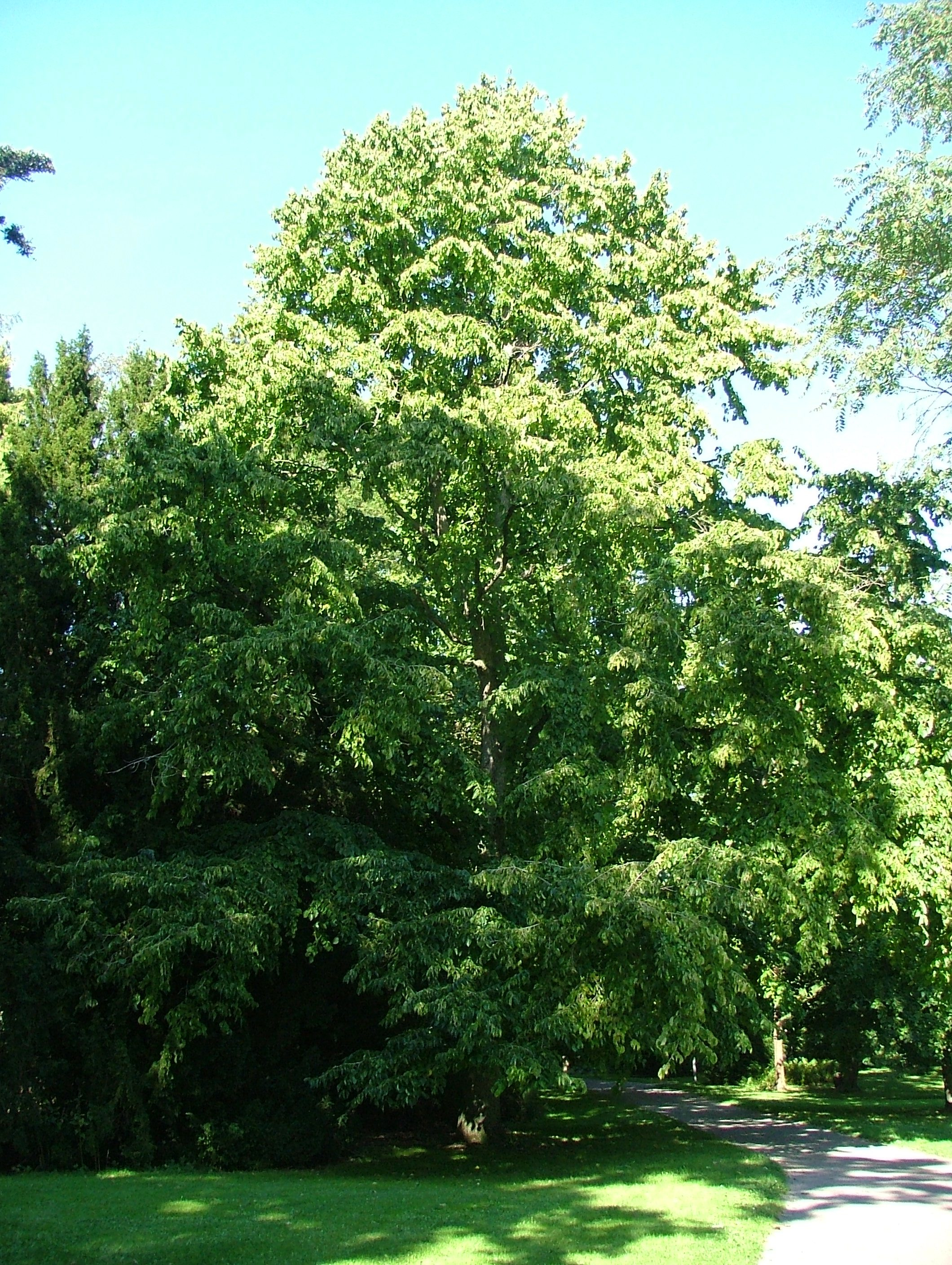
Corylus colurna, the Turkish hazel, in Turkey.

Hazelnut production in Turkey is important as Turkey cultivates and processes most of the world's hazelnuts.

== History and geography ==
There are accounts dating back to 1500 BC of hazelnuts being cultivated in the Black Sea region (historically Lazistan) and the Turkish historian Evliya Çelebi described hazelnut orchards in the 1650s, during the Ottoman Empire. The hazelnut plantations are mainly located in the Black Sea region between Artvin and Kocaeli. The hazelnut regions are divided in an older eastern part which spans from Ordu to Artvin and a new hazelnut region in the western part of the Black Sea between Samsun and Kocaeli. Most hazelnuts are grown in the provinces of Ordu, Samsun, Artvin and Giresun while in Sakarya and Düzce hazelnut production is very efficient. In Ordu alone, 200,000 tons were harvested in 2017.

As many young people have moved to cities farmers tend to be older.

All commercial production in Turkey is from the Corylus avellana plant and not the Corylus colurna native to Turkey.

== Orchards ==
Several traditional cultivars of hazel tree account for the bulk of the harvest, such as Tombul, Çakıldak, Foşa and Sivri, but since 2012 an ambitious breeding program led to cultivars with a faster ripening process. Harvesting and drying is usually in August. Average farm size is about 3 hectares and often steeply sloping: this size is said to be due to division on inhertitance and too small.

Hazelnut plantations are widespread and approximately 400,000 families are in possession of an orchard. After criticism that children have been employed harvesting hazelnuts, Ferrero, one of the main clients of the hazelnut industry and the producer of Nutella, started a Farming Values Programme in 2012. Balsu and Olam International, two other major enterprises involved in the industry, have also begun to tackle child labor in co-operation with Nestlé and the Turkish Government. Hazelnut production in Turkey rose steadily after 1964, when a law on a Guarantee of Purchase was introduced, after which a large part of the peasants in the Black Sea region became hazelnut cultivators. Thereafter, Turkey became the most important producer of hazelnuts and exports to more than a 100 countries. Over half the production cost is labour, and the largest cost is for harvesting. The largest environmental impact is from synthetic fertiliser use and it has been suggested that the yield should be studied for different soils and fertiliser use varied accordingly. It has also been suggested that farmers should be supported in the 3 year transition to organic farming. As of 2023 there is not much organic farming, due to the difficulties of getting enough nitrogen into the soil and controlling some pests, especially nut weevil.

== Pests ==
The damages on the hazelnut industry in Turkey has been estimated to be US$200 million in 2017, US$300 million in 2018 and is mainly attributed to the brown marmorated stink bug, green stink bug and the powdery mildew.

=== Brown marmorated stink bug ===
The stink bug was first reported in Levent district of Istanbul in Turkey in September 2017. In October of the same year it was observed in Artvin Province and the species has rapidly spread to other areas in Eastern Black Sea Region, where most of the hazelnut production occurs. The bug is believed to have entered the country through Georgia, as it was initially reported in Kemalpaşa, Artvin just few kilometers away from the border between both countries. Celal Tuncer, a professor from the Ondokuz Mayıs University has stated that the bug has already caused a 20% drop in Artvin's hazelnut yield and is expected to cause a 50% drop in hazelnut production and quality in the future. According to Tuncer these drops would lead to US$1 billion in damages to hazelnut producers.

== See also ==
- Hazelnut production in Chile
