= Hazelnut production in Chile =

In the southern hemisphere, Chile is the largest producer of hazelnut with most of the production exported to Europe and the United States. The history of hazelnut cultivation can be traced back to 19th century German, Italian and Swiss immigrants in Araucanía. Large plantations of hazelnut are however a new phenomenon from the 2000s onward. Cultivation is centered in Central and South-central Chile. In 2016 Chile exported about 6,500 ton hazelnuts. Chilean hazelnuts are described by Reuters as an alternative to Turkish hazelnuts that dominate the international market. Hazelnuts grown in Chile should no be confused with the native nuts of Gevuina avellana that grow in Valdivian temperate rain forest, a tree that is called Chilean hazel. The species are not closely related.

== See also ==
- History of agriculture in Chile
- Hazelnut production in Turkey
