= Fishing industry in Chile =

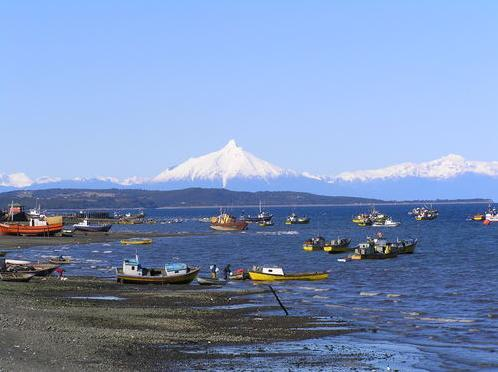
Fishing boats in Quellón, Chiloé with Corcovado volcano in the background

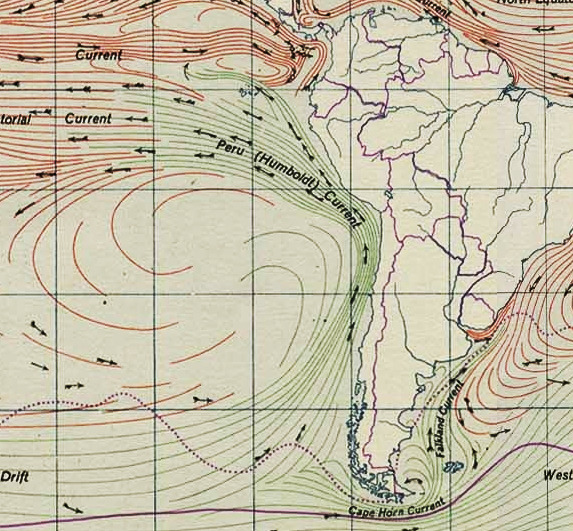
Humboldt Current

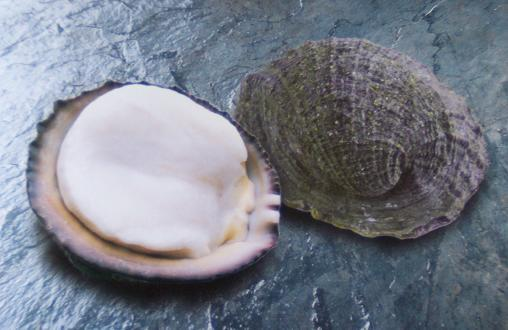
Two live individuals of Concholepas concholepas; the one on the left has been turned over to show the underside of the large muscular foot

Fishing in Chile is a major industry with a total catch of 4,442,877 tons of fish in 2006. As of 2010, Chile has the seventh largest commercial catch in the world. With over 4,000 km (2,500 miles) of viable coastline, fishing has been a vital resource for small-scale business and family development for hundreds of years. However, there are social, environmental, and economical issues with small-scale fisheries. Due to the Humboldt Current, the Chilean Sea is considered among the most productive marine ecosystems in the world as well as the largest upwelling system. Artisanal fishing is practiced all over Chile's 6,435 km long coastline and combines industrial techniques with pre-Hispanic traditions. Recreational fishing tourism in southern Chile's rivers has recently gained worldwide fame attracting actors such as Harrison Ford, Michael Douglas, and Kevin Costner. Central issues within the fishing sector in Chile include the rate of exploitation exceeding what ecosystems can maintain and little regulation on harvests.

== History ==
Fishing began in Chile with the introduction of salmon species into the country at the end of the 19th century — with great success since the salmon did not encounter any large enemies or predators in Chile's cold and temperate waters. Subsequently, the state, first as a social policy and then to promote aquaculture, played an active role in creating fish farms that released into rivers various species like rainbow trout, brown trout, brook trout; and anadromous species such as silver salmon, king salmon, and Atlantic salmon. As a result, a number of species have adapted well to the new environment.

Following a period of brutal overfishing, Chile set up a quota system in 2001, which helped stocks stabilize. This quota system existed to distribute quotas of catch for both pescadores artesanales (traditional, artisanal fisherman) and the industrial fishing market. This quota applied both to where and when fishermen can go after their catch as well as what types of fish they can catch and how many in a given period. Although companies and coalitions of individuals are free to sell their quotas, they were originally allocated on the basis of the historical division of the catch among firms. That gave established operators, which got free quotas, an advantage over new entrants, which had to buy them from rivals. A series of mergers have put 91% of the total industrial quota for jack mackerel, sardines, pilchards and hake in the hands of just four companies. This law expired in 2012. It was replaced by the controversial Ley de Pesca or Ley Longueira whose passage has now been shown to have been influenced by bribes paid by Corpesca industrial fisheries to three politicians from the Iquique region.

The most affected group for this legislation and this struggle with globalization are the approximately 86,000 independent fishermen. They ply the waters close to Chile's shore in 13,000 vessels, ranging from semi-industrial ships to rowing boats. These thousands of fishermen represent nearly half of the fishing sector in Chile (about 45%) but they struggle against the increasing industrial presence, especially in Valparaiso and other small cities like Bio-Bio, Chiloe, and Pelhullue. An increase in licensing checks in the region have severely impacted the men and women who have for decades used this industry to provide for their families and pass down their skills to the next generation. In Chile, many families rely on the economic and social roles from fishing, in order to increase revenue and profit at these smaller scale fisheries. Licenses require that fishermen register their catch and never venture outside of their registered zone. Artisanal fishermen once had exclusive fishing rights to five nautical miles of the coastline—industrial-fishing boats could only trawl more than five miles out. However, this also created trouble as certain fish can only be caught farther out. Artisanal fishermen do not have access to this catch. This has since become a moot point as, with the expiration of parts of the quota fishing law, artisanal fishermen's coveted and exclusive access to coastline has shrunk to within one nautical mile of the shore.

== Industrial fishing ==
Industrial fishing companies in Chile have reported no more than 10,000 employees. They own 55 percent of the market but only four companies own over 92 percent of the market: Marfood, Orizon, Blumar, and Camanchaca. In addition to the clear monopoly of profits, Chile's new "Fisheries Act" is disproportionately beneficial to large-scale industrial fishing companies. In February 2013, marine resources were privatized for "a period of 20 years, renewable and transferable," disproportionately benefiting the big industrial fishing companies. Seven families will profit from the "Longueira Act", named after the Economy Minister who created it. The beneficiaries are the Angelini, Sarkis, Stengel, Cifuentes, Jiménez, Izquierdo and Cruz families, who will enjoy no less than three million dollars in annual profits. The new legislation amends the scope of the sustainability of hydro-biological resources and access to industrial and artisanal fishing, as well as regulating the investigation and oversight of the industry. It creates 20-year renewable contracts to not only Chilean industrial fisheries but also to foreign companies, primarily from northern Europe and Asia Minor.

The main argument used by Minister Longueira to defend the legislation was that it was going to "promote the sustainability of fishing resources," but, upon examination, this is not the case. "The government's motive is to reinforce the economic model in place; there is a political interest in making fishery resources belong to someone," says Cosme Caracciolo, an artisanal fisherman and a member of the National Council for the Defense of Artisanal Fishing (CONDEPP). "Under this fisheries law, 20-year renewable concessions have been awarded, creating ownership over fish that have not yet been born. It's absurd! It's applying capitalism to living resources". "They now want to increase the quota for jack mackerel, which is recognized as an endangered species," Caracciolo laments. The head of World Wide Fund for Nature (WWF) for Chile's Sustainable Fisheries Program, Mauricio Gálvez, backs this view. He insists "the decision of the Chilean National Fishery Council to increase the catch quota of jack mackerel by 11.9 per cent is completely unacceptable, given the current overexploitation of the stock". One of the simplest methods for identifying a troubled fishery is to compare the average size of mature stock over a period of time. In the case of hake, another popular catch off the cost of Chile, the median length for mature stock has shrunk from 37 centimeters a decade ago to 28 centimeters today. Efforts have been made to block the "Fisheries Act" through petitions to the Constitutional Court sponsored by a number of Congress representatives, but these efforts have yet to see progress. Most of these protests come from indigenous communities, but also from artisanal coalitions.

== Small-scale fisheries ==
Small-scale fisheries (SSF) are defined differently depending on location, however, SSF can be broadly defined as small scale, traditional fishing using low-tech gear and labor-intensive practices. For more than approximately 2 million people in Latin America, small-scale fisheries are an essential source of food, employment, livelihood, and income. Problems with SSF range from the extensive labor involved in these practices, a lack of policy support and regulation, and marginalization due to little financial support. Small-scale fisheries in Chile face social inequality challenges and poverty. Fisherman struggle with getting resources, the economic markets, and coping with new technologies in the fishing industry. This gives unequal access to income and opportunities for small-scale fisheries.

The Chilean coastline contains one of the most diverse marine ecosystems, especially their plant components like kelp and macroalgae. The species that inhabit these waters have a higher degree of endemism, meaning they're native to a specific geographic location. This uniqueness means they suffer from pressures involving human activity, exploitation, and habitat destruction.

Governing small-scale fisheries is often difficult because they are unregulated and frequently do not have a political voice due to their rural locations. Governments have tired one approach on adding more regulation on resource extraction on small-scale fisheries globally. Another governmental approach being used in Chile is subsidizing small-scale fisheries, using them more as a benefit for research and education.

== Recreational fishing ==
There are no reliable statistics of the pastimes of Chileans, but it is believed that fishing is the third or fourth most popular hobby. Simple and low-cost fishing gear is the most popular. The most popular bait used includes earthworms, fresh-water crab, shrimp, snails, small fish, and white beans. The more complex fishing gear has gained in popularity with imported rods and reels running less than 5,000 Chilean pesos, and fly fishing gear selling for less than 50,000 Chilean pesos. Fly fishing is the fastest growing sector in sport fishing in Chile. Tourists have come to know Chile as the destination for salmon fishing. The increase in tour guides for tourist fishing has been explosive — from only a few fishing lodges in the 1990s, to over a dozen new lodges in the new century. For years, local fishers have faced pressure to cease operations, driven by allegations of overfishing from policymakers, conservationists, and business interests. Lawmakers and participants in sport fishing are working together to make new laws to help regulate the fishing tourism industry and ensure its longevity.

Freshwater sport fishing mainly occurs from Region V of Valparaíso to the south of Chile, being particularly successful and rich in freshwater species from Region IX of Araucanía to Region XII of Magallanes and Antártica Chilena, and tourism development is mainly concentrated in the Araucanía.

== See also ==
- Aquaculture in Chile
- Agriculture in Chile
- Concholepas concholepas
- Humboldt Current
- Maritime history of Chile
