= Muwaqaf Foundation =

Saudi charity

The Muwaqaf (Blessed Relief) Foundation was a Saudi charity that operated internationally during the 1990s. Its leadership and activities have been tied to terrorist activity.

== Formation and activities ==
The Muwafaq Foundation was started by Khalid bin Mahfouz in Saudi Arabia in 1991 to "establish an endowment like the Rockefeller Foundation to give grants for disaster relief, education, and health". The organization operated schools and health clinics in various countries ranging from Pakistan to Bosnia and Somalia. The organization was directed by Khalid bin Mahfouz's son, Abdulrahman bin Mahfouz, and Yasin al-Qadi, another prominent Saudi businessman who has also been linked to terrorist funding and was listed as a Specially Designated National by the U.S. Department of Treasury.

Khalid bin Mahfouz owned National Commercial Bank, Saudi Arabia's biggest bank. In a lawsuit filed by families of 9/11 victims, the bank was said to have been involved in financing a number of bin Laden's terrorist attacks. An audit showed that money was channeled from the National Commercial Bank's Zakat Committee had channeled $74 million to the International Islamic Relief Organization and had moved money from Muwafaq to al Qaeda.

The Muwafaq Foundation is part of the Islamic Charity Project International umbrella organization which oversees over a dozen Islamic charities including Iran's Ayatollah Khomeini Society. The organization has been called "an al Qaeda front that transfers millions from wealthy Saudis to bin Laden" by the U.S. Treasury Department.

The bin Mafouz family has denied that the Muwafaq Foundation was involved in funding terrorism.

== Chronology ==
The initial registration of the organization was done by al-Qadi, as well as its later registration as a financial trust in 1992.

In May 1992, the organization described itself as having a new structure that was based in Jersey but focused on Pakistan, with offices in Islamabad and Peshawar. The island of Jersey is a tax haven and does not require charities to register and submit records so there are no public records documenting the foundation there.

While not much is known about the actual activities of the organization, it is known to have operated internationally in several countries. The Muwafaq began activity in the Sudan in 1992 and began to benefit from funds collected by the Sudan government through a zakat, the Islamic charity tax on all citizens. In Sudan, the Muwaqaf partnered at least once with UNICEF who contributed $7,000 to develop a feeding center for malnourished children. Muwaqaf remained in Sudan as late as 1997 when it was described in a UN report as carrying out projects in health, education, and agriculture.

Documents in 1993 show that the Muwaqaf was located in Somalia, but its headquarters were recorded as being in Delaware, which has the most relaxed corporate disclosure requirements in the United States. The headquarters in Delaware was shut down in 1995. The Muwafaq was also linked to mujahedeen operations in the Balkans and Europe, with offices registered in Croatia, Albania, Bosnia, Austria, and Germany.

The foundation was also present in Ethiopia, which in the early 1990s led to allegations of their supporting terrorist activity in Africa. The newsletter Africa Confidential published a connection between the Muwafaq Foundation and an assassination attempt on Egyptian President Hosni Mubarak. It was believed that the Sudanese government and Islamist organizations were behind the assassination attempt. In 1995, the foundation filed a libel suit against the newsletter which it later won. The claims of the connection between the Muwafaq and the assassination attempt turned out to be false.

In 1995, Ramzi Yousef was arrested for the 1993 World Trade Center bombing in New York which caused Pakistani authorities to raid the Islamabad offices of both Muwaqaf and another charity, Mercy International. Amir Mehdi was the local head of Muwaqaf at the time and was held in prison for several months before he was eventually released without charge.

In 1996, Paris based Arab newspaper Al-Watan al-Arabi published an interview with bin Laden. In the interview bin Laden named Muwaqaf in Zagreb, Croatia as a part of a humanitarian organization network of which he was a major supporter.

In 1997, the bad publicity from the Africa Confidential article caused the Saudi government to end their operations, but its infrastructure, its legal system, and some of its schools and clinics were not ever formally dismantled. According to Yasin al-Qadi, the foundation closed in 1996.

In 1998 the Muwaqaf became the subject of an FBI investigation after a man linked to Muwaqaf was named as a terrorist supporter.
