= Sociedad Nacional de Agricultura =

Chilean guild association

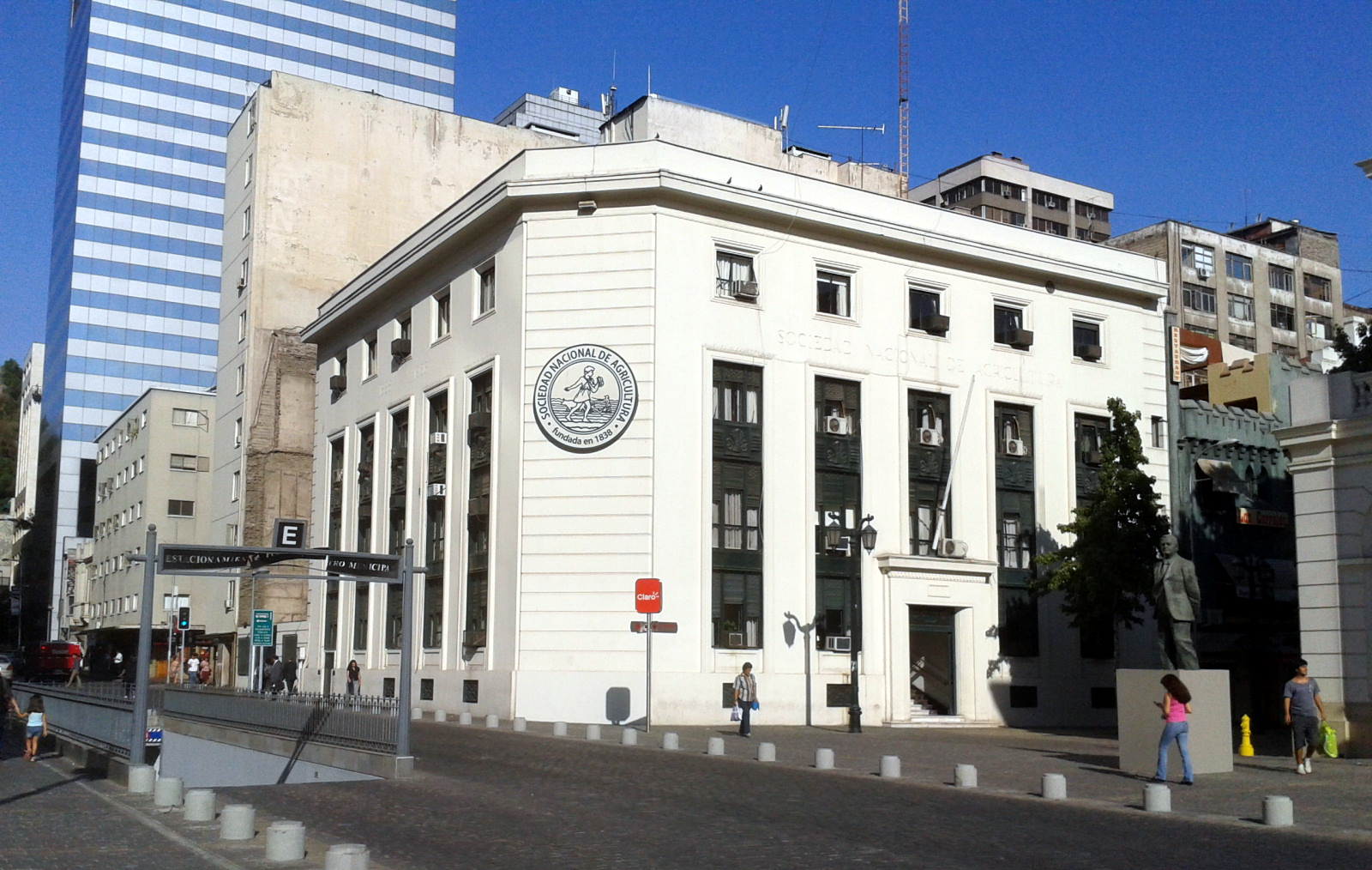
Building of the Sociedad Nacional de Agricultura.

The Sociedad Nacional de Agricultura (S.N.A.; Spanish for National Agriculture Society) is a guild association grouping landowners, professionals and minor associations involved in agriculture in Chile. It is considered Chile's oldest surviving guild association.
