= Temucuicui =

- Location within Chile
- Coordinates: 38.090556°S 72.433056°W
- Region: Araucanía
- Province: Malleco
- Municipality: Ercilla
- Commune: Ercilla

Government
  - Type: Municipal

Population (2017)
  - Total: 271
- Census not carried out as usual given incidents
- Time zone: UTC−04:00 (Chilean Standard)
  - Summer (DST): UTC−03:00 (Chilean Daylight)
- Area code: Country + town = 56 + 45

Temucuicui or Temocuicui (from Mapudungun Temu kuykuy, "temu bridge") is a locality made up a group of Mapuche communities in the commune of Ercilla, Malleco Province, Araucanía Region, in Chile.

The Mapuche communities established themselves in Temucuicui in 2002 when the National Corporation for Indigenous Development handed over the Fundo Alaska. In the last decades the communities of Temucuicui have had a conflict, at times physically violent, with the forestry company Forestal Mininco, leading to the detention and imprisonment of community members in the prisons of Angol and Cañete. Some inhabitants of Temucuicui have also had legal disputes with farmer Héctor Urban whose family owns land nearby.

During the 2017 census the communities of Temucuicui could not be registered as in other places given incidents the day before the census. Later, the National Statistics Institute counted 271 inhabitants and 85 homes divided among five communities: Autónoma, Tradicional, Ignacio Queipul I, Ignacio Queipul II and Ignacio Queipul III.

== See also ==
- Shooting of Camilo Catrillanca
- Mapuche conflict
