= Forestal Mininco =

Chilean forest products company

Forestal Mininco S.A.
- Founded: 1947
- Parent: CMPC
- Subsidiaries: Bosques del Plata
- Website: forestalmininco.cl

Forestal Mininco is the forestry branch of wood product and woodpulp company CMPC. According to CMPC "Forestal Mininco territorially manages the forest heritage of CMPC in Chile."

In the last decades Forestal Mininco have had a conflict, at times physically violent, with the indigenous Mapuche communities of Temucuicui, leading to the detention and imprisonment of community members in the prisons of Angol and Cañete. Within the context of the Mapuche conflict Forestal Mininco has been accused by Mapuche organization Coordinadora Arauco-Malleco to work with gun-armed contractors.
