= Centro Vitivinícola Nacional =

Centro Vitivinícola Nacional is an organization that groups together Argentine wine producers. It was established in 1905.
