= Ercilla, Chile =

Ercilla
- Town and Commune
- Coat of arms Location of the Ercilla commune in the Araucanía Region Location in Chile
- Coordinates: 38°03′S 72°23′W
- Country: Chile
- Region: Araucanía
- Province: Malleco

Government
  - Type: Municipality
  - Alcalde: Ramón Vilches Álvarez (Ind.)

Area
  - Total: 499.7 km^{2} (192.9 sq mi)
- As of 2002
- Elevation: 306 m (1,004 ft)

Population (2012 Census)
  - Total: 8,466
  - Density: 16.94/km^{2} (43.88/sq mi)
  - Urban: 3,238
  - Rural: 5,803
- Demonym: Ercillano

Sex
  - Men: 4,633
  - Women: 4,408
- Time zone: UTC-4 (CLT)
  - Summer (DST): UTC-3 (CLST)
- Area code: 56 + 45
- Website: www.muniercilla.cl

Ercilla is a Chilean town and commune in the Malleco Province, Araucanía Region. Its name is a tribute to Alonso de Ercilla, who wrote La Araucana.

== Demographics ==
Historical population
Year	Pop.	±% p.a.
1885	6,050	—
1895	10,531	+5.70%
1907	7,855	−2.41%
1920	8,361	+0.48%
1930	7,727	−0.79%
1940	8,136	+0.52%
1952	7,556	−0.61%
1970	9,101	+1.04%
1982	9,694	+0.53%
1992	9,099	−0.63%
2002	10,237	+1.19%
2017	10,251	+0.01%
2024	10,247	−0.01%
Source: "Censo de Población y Vivienda". National Statistics Institute.

According to the 2002 census of the National Statistics Institute, Ercilla spans an area of 499.7 km^{2} (193 sq mi) and has 9,041 inhabitants (4,633 men and 4,408 women). Of these, 3,238 (35.8%) lived in urban areas and 5,803 (64.2%) in rural areas. Between the 1992 and 2002 censuses, the population grew by 2.3% (199 persons).

== Administration ==
As a commune, Ercilla is a third-level administrative division of Chile administered by a municipal council, headed by an alcalde who is directly elected every four years. The 2008-2012 alcalde is Ramón Vilches Álvarez (Ind.).

Within the electoral divisions of Chile, Ercilla is represented in the Chamber of Deputies by Gonzalo Arenas (UDI) and Mario Venegas (PDC) as part of the 48th electoral district, together with Angol, Renaico, Collipulli, Los Sauces, Purén, Lumaco and Traiguén. The commune is represented in the Senate by Alberto Espina Otero (RN) and Jaime Quintana Leal (PPD) as part of the 14th senatorial constituency (Araucanía-North).
