= Enclave economy =

An enclave economy is defined as an economic system in which an export based industry dominated by international or non-local capital extracts resources or products from another country. It was widely employed as a term to describe post-colonial dependency relations in the developing world, especially in Latin America. As part of the larger theoretical position usually called dependency theory. It was particularly popular in the 1960s and 1970s, and other issues took center stage in development economics at later periods. It was often associated with Marxism, thanks to writing by Paul Baran and Theotonio Dos Santos, though its tenets are only peripherally tied to classic Marxist theory.

According to the model, a large, well capitalized firm, often located in North America or Western Europe invests in the production of an export product destined for markets in the investing country or region. Frequently the country in question had been a colonial master, even if the political chain was broken a considerable time before. It uses its capital and often political connections, both formal and informal, legal and illegal, to acquire land, access labor, and received incentives such as tax breaks. These incentives in turn reduce the capacity of the host country to realize any financial or developmental benefits from the exports.

In some cases, the firms operating in enclave economies are able to influence governments in host countries to allow exploitative labor practices, to suppress resistance or the formation of labor unions and thus exploit workers. Its relationship with the host government is also held to promote corruption, both at the local level and in the attitudes of the host country towards the international interests of the firm.

Scholars have debated the terms of the theory of enclave economies, some arguing that the effect of tax breaks is temporary, others pointing out that workers are sometimes better paid than their fellow workers. Others point to potential linkages between the workers, host country and the projects of the investing firm (for example in constructing infrastructure) have a more beneficial effect that the original theorists suppose.

== Other uses of the term ==
In more recent literature the term enclave economy has been used in a different sense than it was in the development debate. In the newer literature, it often refers to ethnically defined communities, often from developing countries, who reside and work sometimes illegally, sometimes under legal temporary admission contracts, or sometimes as legal immigrants in developed countries.
