= Aquaculture in Chile =

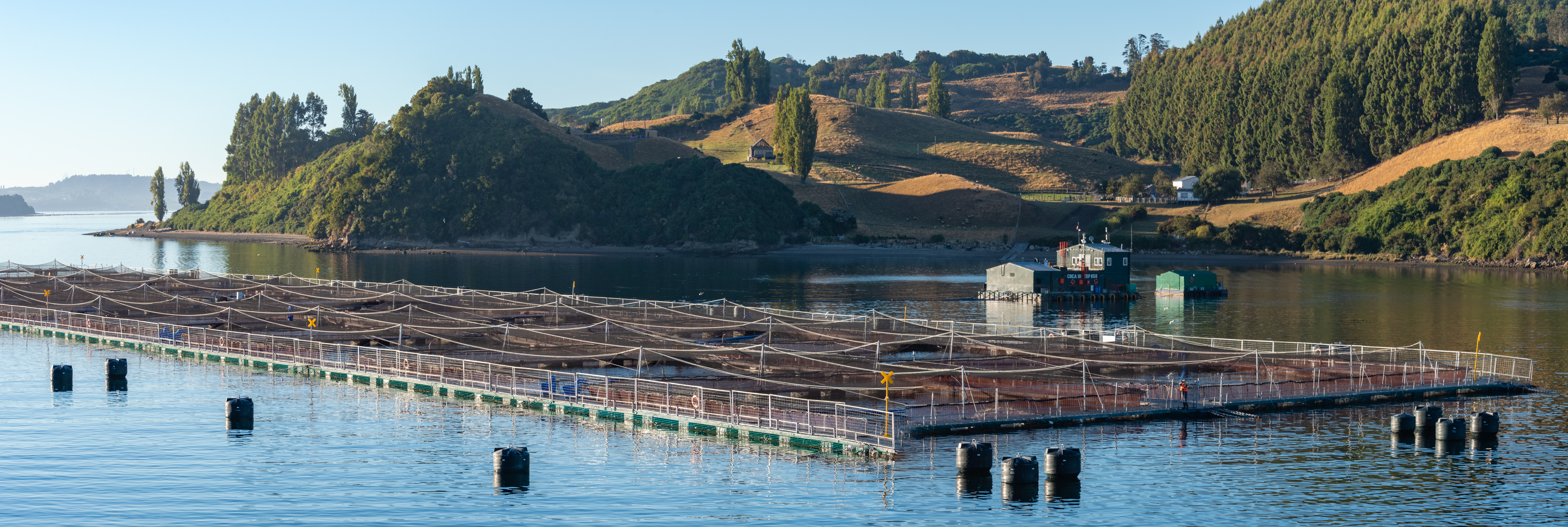
Aquaculture fish farming in the Estero de Castro inlet of Chiloé Island

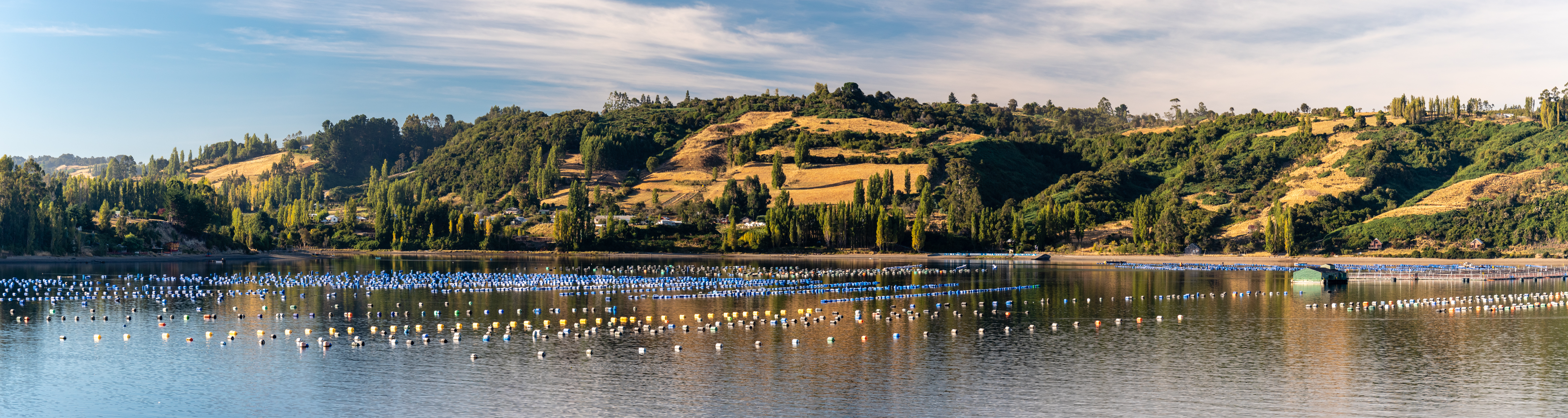
Mussel aquaculture farming in the fjords of southern Chile

Aquaculture is a major economic activity in Chile. Among the diverse aquacultures practised in Chile, Atlantic salmon aquaculture is by far the largest sector. Apart from salmon and trout, Chilean aquaculture also produces turbots and molluscs, in particular Mytilus platensis (still often referred to as Mytilus chilensis), Northern scallops, Pacific oysters, Aulacomya ater (a giant mussel), red abalone, and Chilean oysters. In terms of algae Gracillaria chilensis is cultivated and harvested.

The main areas of aquaculture in Chile lie in the southern half of the country, in particular in the interior waters of Los Lagos Region and to a lesser extent the fjords and channels of more southern Aysén and Magallanes regions.

== Salmon ==
Up until 2007, Chile experienced over 15 years of important growth in its salmon aquaculture, becoming the second largest salmon and trout producer after Norway. By 2006 Chile contributed with 38% of the world's salmon volume just behind Norway that produced 39% of it. In 2006, salmon from Chilean aquacultures was the third largest export product in terms of value, representing 3.9% of Chilean exports behind copper and molybdenum.

=== Ecological impact ===
Industrial aquaculture firstly sees millions of escapee fish into the native ecosystem every year In October 2018, a major breach at the salmon culture center of Punta Redonda (managed by Marine Harvest) led to the leakage of 690,000 salmon in the country's rivers. Those salmon were treated with Florfenicol, thus not edible by humans.

The unregulated use of chemical compounds, such as antibiotics used to prevent infections, may influence the entire ecosystem as well as copper used as antifouling (Buschmann et al. 2006) and litter (Pumalin, 2008); and the loading of nutrients from aquaculture into the interior sea and lakes and nutrients from large scale mussel farms

The industry suffered during the Great Recession, which coincided with a sudden appearance and outbreak of infectious salmon anemia in 2007. Atlantic salmon production in Chile has fallen from 400,000 to 100,000 tonnes from 2005 to 2010. By 2009, a salmon executive expected production to go back to the 2007 levels within four years. The 2007 infection led to more stringent sanitary regulations.

The nets of the salmon cages have occasionally killed endangered whales as it happened in 2020 with a sei whale near Guaitecas Archipelago.

=== Harmful algal blooms and industrial salmon aquaculture ===
Studies undertaken by marine biologists aim to verify the link between the waste generated by the salmon industry in the Chilean oceanic waters and the outbreak of the highly toxic red tide harmful algal blooms in the region. Following this outbreak, from 2016 and 2018, 40 thousand tons of salmon were lost following fatal health issues (0.9% of the total salmon cultivated in Chilean seawaters), but salmon producers deny the direct link between their activities and the red tide outbreak.

Evidence from Comau Fiord where a Harmful Algal Bloom caused a mass die of cold water coral reefs was directly linked to the eutrophic conditions causing HABs from the Salmon Farms in the area. This was clearer than the open sea being a semi enclosed basin

== Aquaculture and private property rights in the sea ==
Aquaculture in Chile is regulated by the 1989 Fisheries and Aquaculture Law, and concessions on waterbodies and other state property for establishment of aquacultures are granted by the Ministry of Defence.

However differently to any other country in the world, the Chilean government has given these marine spaces private property rights. This means it is impossible for the public scientific regulator IFOP to access the area to take benthic or water quality samples. That means through the fluid nature of the sea, the ecological impacts are felt in common while the profits are kept private by the corporation. It is hoped in the future that fair regulation will evolve, allowing greater transparency over this highly profitable industry.

In November 2018, the Chinese company Joyvio Group bought the Chilean salmon producer Australis Seafoods for $880 million, thus gaining control over 30% of all Chilean salmon exports.
