= Sollipulli =

Volcanic mountain in Chile

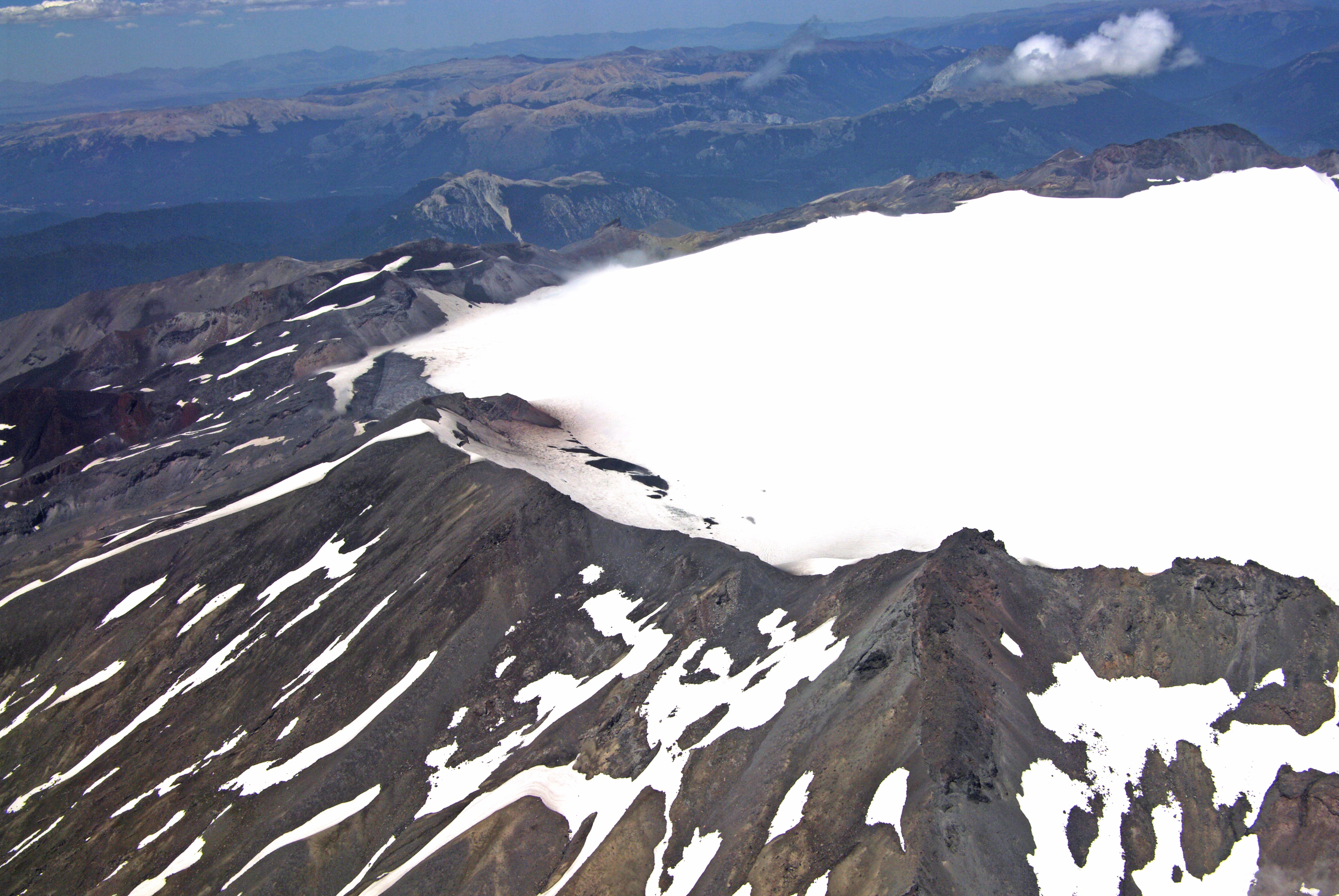
- Aerial photograph of volcan Sollipulli, looking southeast. The dark red feature on the side of Sollipulli is the cinder cone called Chufquen which formed during the most recent eruption, about 700 years ago.

Highest point
- Elevation: 2,282 m (7,487 ft)
- Listing: List of volcanoes in Chile
- Coordinates: 38°58′30″S 71°31′12″W

Geography
- Location within Chile
- Location: Southern Chile
- Parent range: Andes

Geology
- Mountain type: Caldera
- Volcanic zone: Southern Volcanic Zone
- Last eruption: 1240 ± 50 years

Sollipulli (Spanish pronunciation: [soʝiˈpuʝi]; lit. 'reddish mountain' in the Mapuche language) is an ice-filled volcanic caldera and volcanic complex, which lies southeast of the small town of Melipeuco in the La Araucanía Region, Chile. It is part of the Southern Volcanic Zone of the Andes, one of the four volcanic belts in the Andes chain.

The volcano has evolved in close contact with glacial ice. It differs from many calderas in that Sollipulli appears to have collapsed in a non-explosive manner. The age of collapse is not yet known, but it is presently filled with ice to thicknesses of 650 m (2,130 ft). The ice drains through two glaciers in the west and the north of the caldera. Sollipulli has developed on a basement formed by Mesozoic and Cenozoic geological formations.

Sollipulli was active in the Pleistocene and Holocene epochs. A large Plinian eruption occurred 2,960–2,780 years before present, forming the Alpehué crater and generating a high eruption column and ignimbrite deposits. The last activity occurred 710 ± 60 years before present and formed the Chufquén scoria cone on the northern flank.

== Geomorphology and geography ==
Sollipulli lies in the Araucanía Region, Cautín Province, Melipeuco commune. The Sollipulli volcano is in the western part of the Nevados de Sollipulli mountain range, which is bordered to the north, south and east by river valleys. The communes of Curarrehue, Cunco, Panguipulli, Pucón and Villarrica are in the area, Melipeuco lies 20 km (12 mi) northwest. The volcano is also part of the Kütralkura geopark project.

=== Regional ===
Sollipulli is part of the Southern Volcanic Zone of the Andes, one of the four belts of volcanoes which are found in the mountain range. The other three are the Northern Volcanic Zone, the Central Volcanic Zone (both north of the Southern Volcanic Zone) and the Austral Volcanic Zone (south of the Southern Volcanic Zone). These volcanic zones are separated by gaps where there is no volcanic activity and the subduction of the Pacific Ocean crust is shallower than in the volcanically active areas. About 60 volcanoes have erupted in historical time in the Andes, and 118 additional volcanic systems show evidence of Holocene eruptions.

There are 60 volcanoes in the Southern Volcanic Zone; among these are Cerro Azul and Cerro Hudson, which experienced large eruptions in 1932 and 1991 that resulted in the emission of substantial volumes of ash. The volcanoes Llaima and Villarrica have been regularly active during recent history.

=== Local ===
Sollipulli is a stratovolcano, which has one 4 km-wide (2.5 mi) caldera on its summit and southwest of it the 1 km-wide (0.62 mi) Alpehué crater. The crater is draped by pyroclastic flow deposits, and its rim reaches a height of 200 m (660 ft). The rims of the caldera rise 150 m (490 ft) above the ice in the caldera; the highest summit of Sollipulli lies on the southern flank of the caldera and reaches an elevation of 2,282 m (7,487 ft) above sea level. On the southern and eastern side the caldera is bordered by several lava domes. The caldera most likely was not formed by a large explosive eruption, considering that no deposits from such an eruption have been found. An older 5 km × 4 km-wide (3.1 mi × 2.5 mi) caldera underlies the summit caldera.

The volcano is formed by lava flows, lava domes, scoria, pillow lavas as well as pumice falls, pyroclastics and other material. The edifice has a volume of about 85 km^{3} (20 cu mi) and covers a surface area of about 250 km^{2} (97 sq mi). Radial valleys extend away from the top. A number of particular landforms on Sollipulli formed under the influence of glacial ice, such as the caldera structure.

The Nevados de Sollipulli mountain chain west of the Sollipulli caldera are a chain of volcanoes which is heavily eroded. They are formed by breccia and lava flows; glacial action has left cirques. Closer to the caldera they are better preserved, with individual flows issuing from fissure vents. This chain is one of several east–northeast striking volcano alignments in the Southern Volcanic Zone, the regional tectonics favour magma ascent along such alignments.

The flanks of the volcano are covered by lava flows, which gives them irregular contours. Glaciers and streams have cut valleys into the slopes and smoothed the lava flows. Two scoria cones are situated on the northern flank, Chufquén and Redondo, each associated with lava flows; about a dozen such craters dot the flanks of the volcano.

==== Glaciers ====
Both the main caldera and the Alpehué crater contain glaciers, which in the caldera reached a thickness of 650 m (2,130 ft) in 1992 and fills it; the total volume was estimated at 6 km^{3} (1.4 cu mi) in 1992. These glaciers feature typical ice structures such as crevasses and there may be a subglacial lake in the caldera. Three lakes are found in the caldera at its margins, the easterly Sharkfin lake, the southeasterly Dome lake and the southwesterly Alpehué lake. These glaciers drain to the north and northwest; the latter glacier flows from the caldera through the Alpehué crater into the valley of the same name, which is drained by the Rio Alpehué into the Rio Allipén river. Other than the caldera and crater glaciers, the only snow cover on Sollipulli is seasonal. Glaciers have been present on the volcano before the Last Glacial Maximum and have left glacial valleys on its slopes, glacial striations and evidence of subglacial eruptions such as hyaloclastite deposits.

The glacier within the caldera of Sollipulli is shrinking; its surface area decreased between 1961 and 2011 and the Alpehuén outlet glacier retreated by 1.3 km (0.81 mi). There is evidence that the equilibrium line altitude has risen above the volcano. Some smaller ice fields around Sollipulli either shrank between 1986 and 2017 or disappeared altogether. The process of glacier retreat is probably accelerated by ash being deposited on the glacier through eruptions at the neighbouring volcano Puyehue-Cordón Caulle; activity at the other volcanoes Llaima and Villarrica may have the same effect. In 2011, the volume of the glacier was 4.5 ± 0.5 km^{3} (1.08 ± 0.12 cu mi). Melting of the glacier risks generating lahars and putting water supplies in the region into jeopardy.

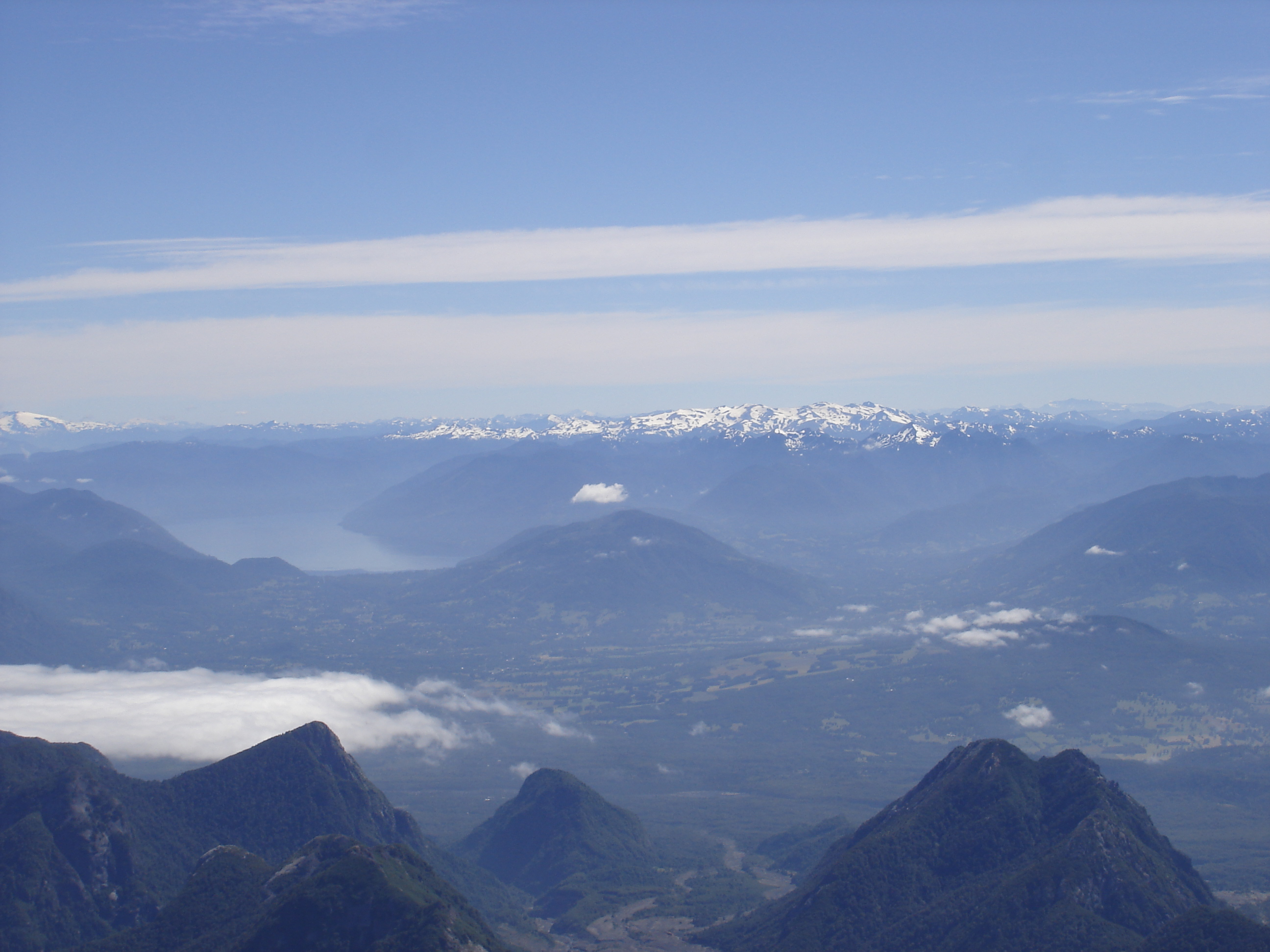
Nevados de Solipulli seen from Villarrica volcano

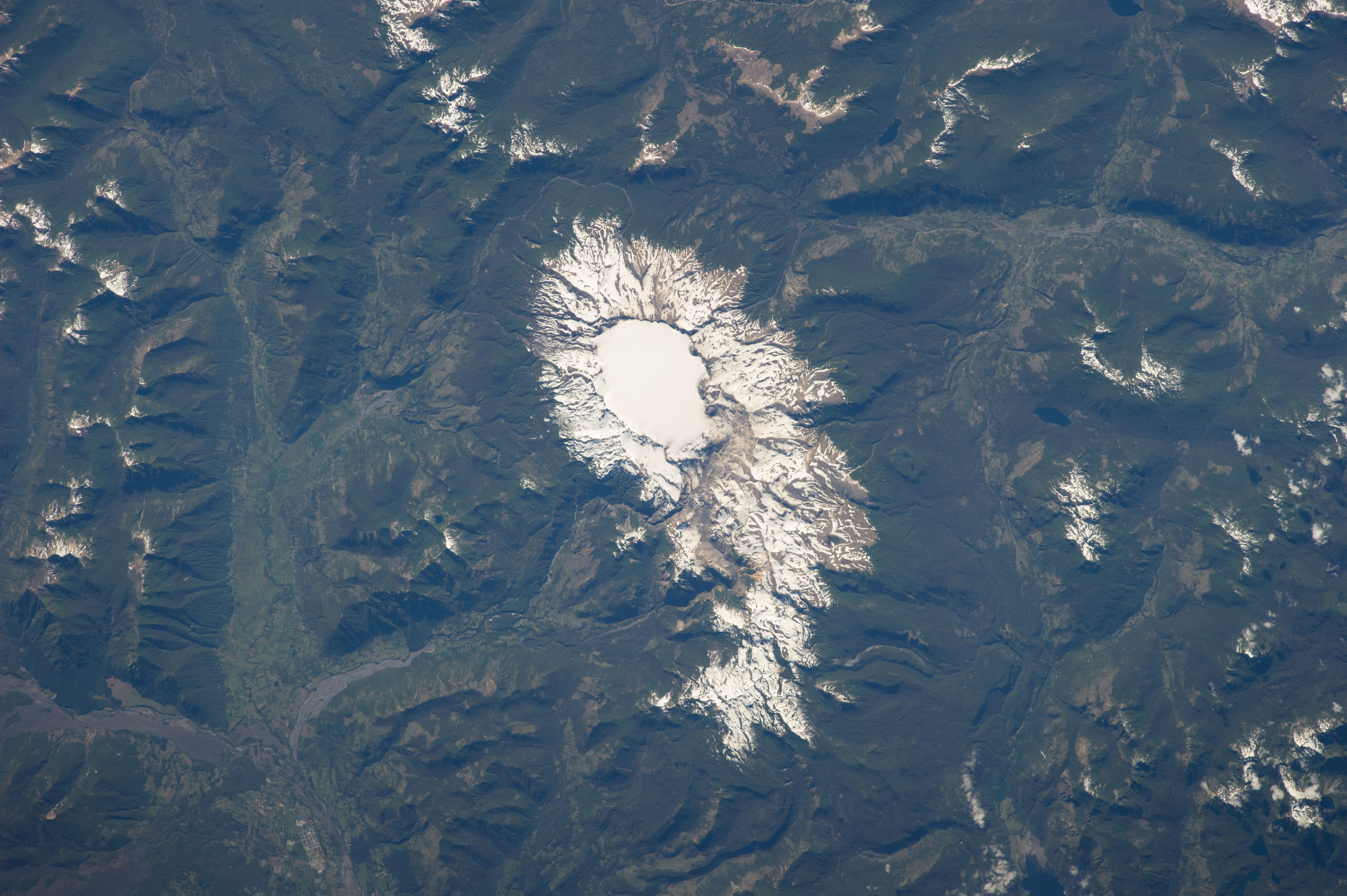
Sollipulli caldera viewed from space, east is up

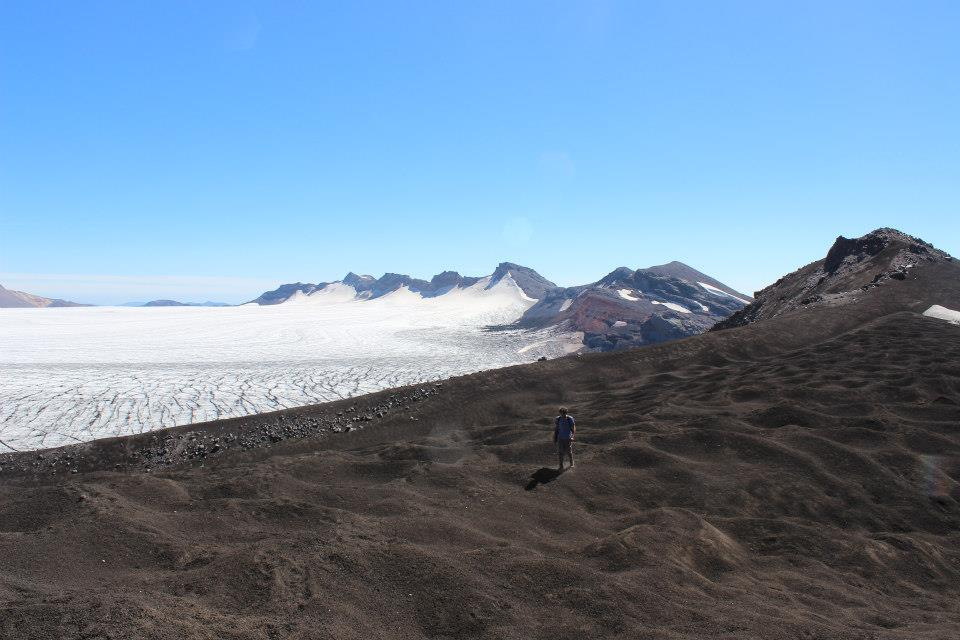
The caldera glacier of Sollipulli

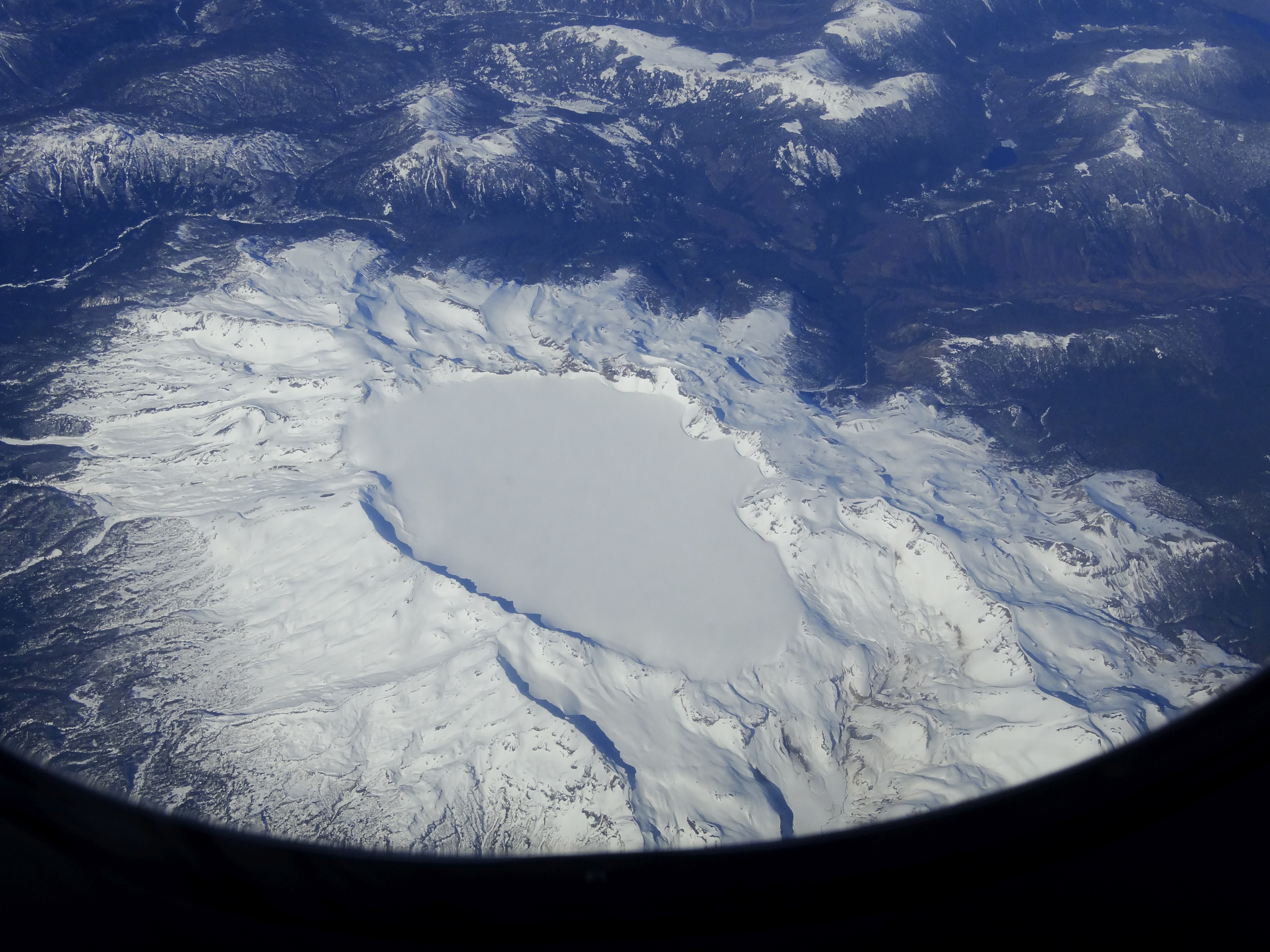
Aerial photograph of Sollipulli Caldera looking east

== Geology ==
Subduction has been ongoing on the western side of South America since 185 million years ago and has resulted in the formation of the Andes and volcanic activity within the range. About 27 million years ago, the Farallon Plate broke up and the pace of subduction increased, resulting in increased volcanic activity and a temporary change in the tectonic regime of the Southern Andes.

Sollipulli volcano developed on a 600-to-1,600-metre-high (2,000–5,200 ft) basement which consists of the Jurassic–Cretaceous Nacientes del Biobío formation and the Pliocene-Pleistocene Nevados de Sollipulli volcanics, with subordinate exposures of the Miocene Curamallín and the Cretaceous-Tertiary Vizcacha-Cumilao complex volcano-sedimentary formations. Miocene granites are intruded into the basement. Two major fault systems, the Liquiñe-Ofqui Fault Zone and the Reigolil-Pirihueico fault, pass west and east of Sollipulli, respectively. They are connected by east–west trending faults which form a graben at Sollipulli.

=== Composition ===
Rocks erupted from Sollipulli range from basalt over basaltic andesite and andesite to dacite. Composition has changed over the evolution of the volcano; sometimes one type of rock is found as inclusion in another. Minerals contained in the rocks include apatite, clinopyroxene, ilmenite, olivine, orthopyroxene, plagioclase and titanomagnetite. Xenoliths are also found, including diorite and granophyre.

The petrogenesis of the Alpehué rocks has been explained with the penetration of more primitive magma into a dacitic magma chamber, which was then subject to magma mixing. The primitive magmas sometimes pass through the flanks of the edifice and form parasitic vents in these cases. Magma storage lasts for several tens of thousands of years. The Alpehué eruption was produced by a magma body separate from that of other Sollipulli eruptions, and which evolved long before the Alpehué eruption.

Obsidian was obtained on Sollipulli and exported over large distances; it has been found as far as Argentina's steppes and northern Chile, and is chemically and in appearance different from obsidian obtained on Chaitén volcano. One source has been identified at a lava dome on the western side of Sollipulli. A route starting south of Melipeuco leads up on the volcano; this route was used for the transport of obsidian in the 1980s.

== Precipitation and vegetation ==
Annual precipitation amounts to 2.1 metres per year (6.9 ft/a) and mostly falls between April and September. The region is forested, with deciduous trees including Nothofagus, with laurel forests around the lakes of the area and woods consisting of Araucaria araucana and Austrocedrus chilensis at altitudes exceeding 800 m (2,600 ft). In addition there are open grasslands called mallines which were used for grazing.

== Eruption history ==
Sollipulli was active during the Pleistocene and Holocene; the Nevados de Sollipulli are less than 1.8 million years old with argon-argon dating having obtained ages of 490,000 ± 30,000 and 312,000 ± 20,000 years ago. Six separate volcanic units form the edifice; from the oldest to the youngest they are the Sharkfin, Northwest, South, Peak, Alpehué and Chufquén units. The first two may be contemporaneous to the formation of the caldera, or they may predate it. The Sharkfin unit was emplaced in a subglacial environment and later disrupted by faulting, later units show substantial evidence of having been altered by glaciers. Radiometric dates have been obtained on the Sharkfin unit (700,000 ± 140,000 and 350,000 ± 90,000 years before present), the Northwest unit (120,000 ± 16,000, 120,000 ± 140,000, 110,000 ± 30,000 and 100,000 ± 30,000 years before present) and the South and Peak units (68,000 ± 14,000, 64,000 ± 15,000 and 26,000 ± 5,000 years before present). The caldera is nested within an older and eroded caldera, and some parasitic cones are heavily eroded whereas others appear to be younger.

Pyroclastic flows from Alpehué have been dated to 2,960–2,780 years before present. The Alpehué unit was emplaced during a large Plinian eruption, which generated a 44 km-high (27 mi) eruption column and ejected about 7.5 km^{3} (1.8 cu mi) of pumice falls. It is the largest known eruption of Sollipulli and one of the largest volcanic eruption to hit northern Patagonia, but did not severely affect vegetation in the region. Tephra from this eruption has been found in neighbouring lakes and in sediment cores from the Argentina Pampa; layers of tephra identified in a bog of South Georgia 3,000 km (1,900 mi) away as well as in an ice core at Siple Dome in Antarctica and dated to about 980 BCE may be a product of the Alpehué eruption. Alpehué tephra has been used as a tephrochronology tool. Pyroclastic flows from the eruption melted the caldera ice sheet, forming lahars (Note: Lahars are volcanic debris flows, where sediment is dissolved in hot water.) that propagated northwest away from Sollipulli. Ignimbrites from this eruption cover surfaces of at least 40 km^{2} (15 sq mi) around Sollipulli, their volume has been estimated to be about 0.4 km^{3} (0.096 cu mi). They are brown to grey in colour and unwelded with the exception of part of the ignimbrite that is emplaced within the Alpehué crater. The eruption reached a level of 5 on the volcanic explosivity index (Note: A volcanic explosivity index of 5 refers to a "cataclysmic" or "paroxysmal" eruption which ejects between 1 and 10 km^{3} (0.24–2.40 cu mi) of rocks.) and led to changes in regional plant communities. Isla 2017 proposed that tephra from the eruption blocked the former outlet of Aluminé Lake into the Biobio River via the Rio Litrán, thus redirecting its flow into the Atlantic Ocean.

Radiocarbon dating at Chufquén has yielded an age of 710 ± 60 years before present. This eruption deposited ash onto the caldera ice, while it is absent from the central parts of the Chufquén valley; either it was removed by a later glacier advance or it landed on a glacier which later retreated. The eruption occurred relatively recently, indicating that Sollipulli is still active. Presently, fumaroles and geothermal phenomena occur at the northwestern foot of Sollipulli.

The 0.2 km^{2} (0.077 sq mi) Alpehue geothermal field, about 4.5 km (2.8 mi) southwest of Alpehue crater, is unusual among the southern Chilean geothermal fields as it features geysers. It lies within a glacial valley presently traversed by the Allipén River, which has cut a vertical canyon into the Nevados de Sollipulli volcano, close to the intersection between two faults. Geothermal features include "spouters", geysers, hot springs and mud pools, as well as geyserite and sinter deposits that form small terrace structures. Geyser columns reach 2.5 m (8 ft 2 in) height when they erupt. The geyser field has a total heat output of about 3.3 megawatts and has been active since at least 7,400 years. The deep incision and fractured rocks may facilitate the ascent of geothermal waters.

=== Hazards ===
The substantial ice body in the caldera means that there is a significant risk of mudflows or glacier bursts in the case of renewed activity. Conversely, a retreat of the caldera-filling glacier might facilitate the onset of explosive eruptions at Sollipulli. A repeat of the Alpehué eruption would be a regional catastrophe, comparable to the 1991 eruption of Cerro Hudson volcano.

The Chilean geological service Sernageomin monitors the volcano and publishes a hazard index for it. The towns of Cunco, Melipeuco and Villa García are close to the volcano. Melipeuco has devised a Volcanic Emergency Plan to deal with future eruptions of Llaima or Sollipulli.
