= Conguillío National Park =

National park in Chile

Parque Nacional Conguillío
- IUCN category II (national park)
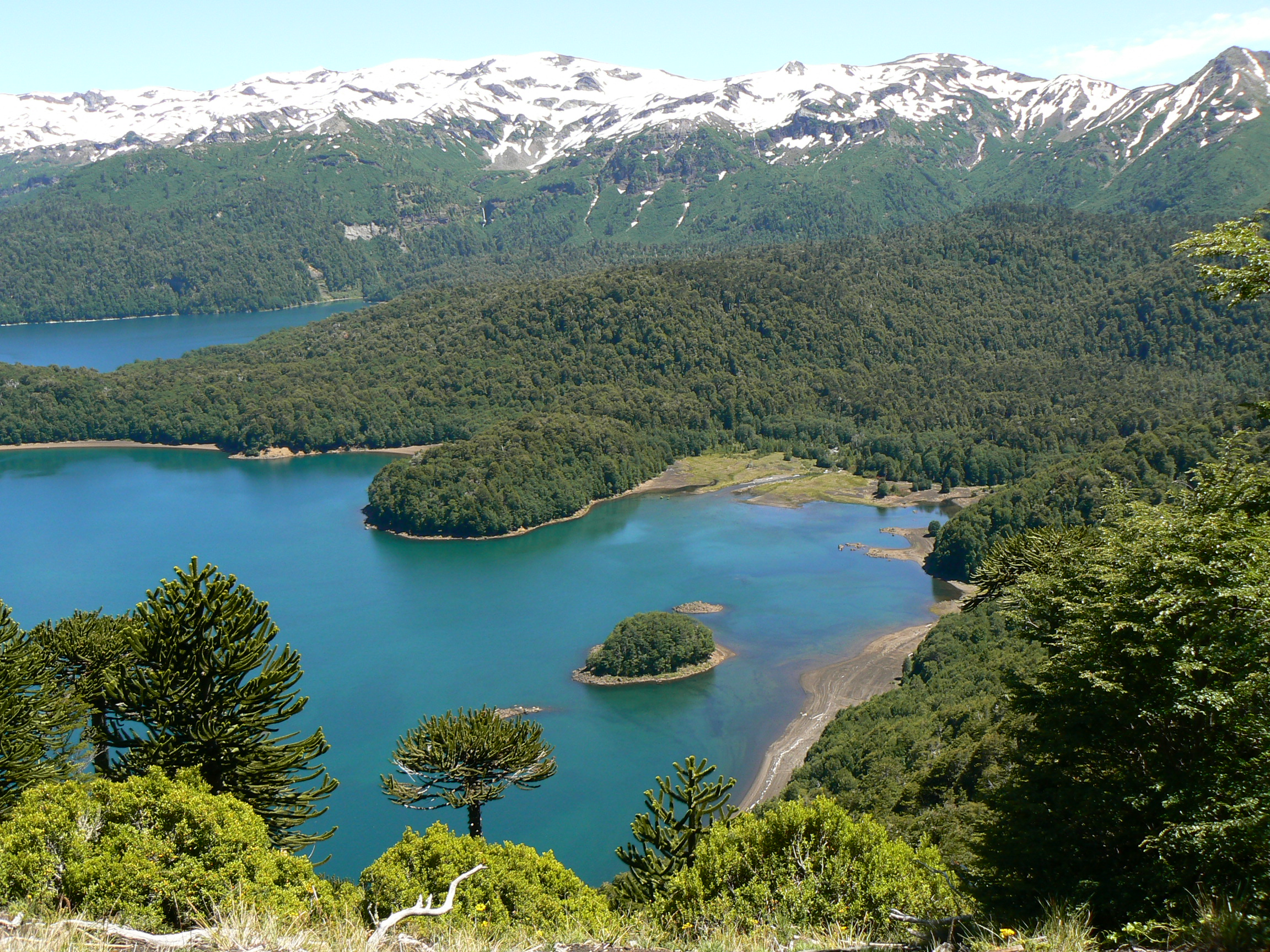
- Conguillío Lake

- Location within Chile
- Location: La Araucanía Region, Chile
- Nearest city: Melipeuco, Curacautín
- Coordinates: 38°40′00″S 71°39′00″W
- Area: 608 km^{2} (150,000 acres)
- Established: 1950
- Visitors: 21,805 (in 2004)
- Governing body: Corporación Nacional Forestal

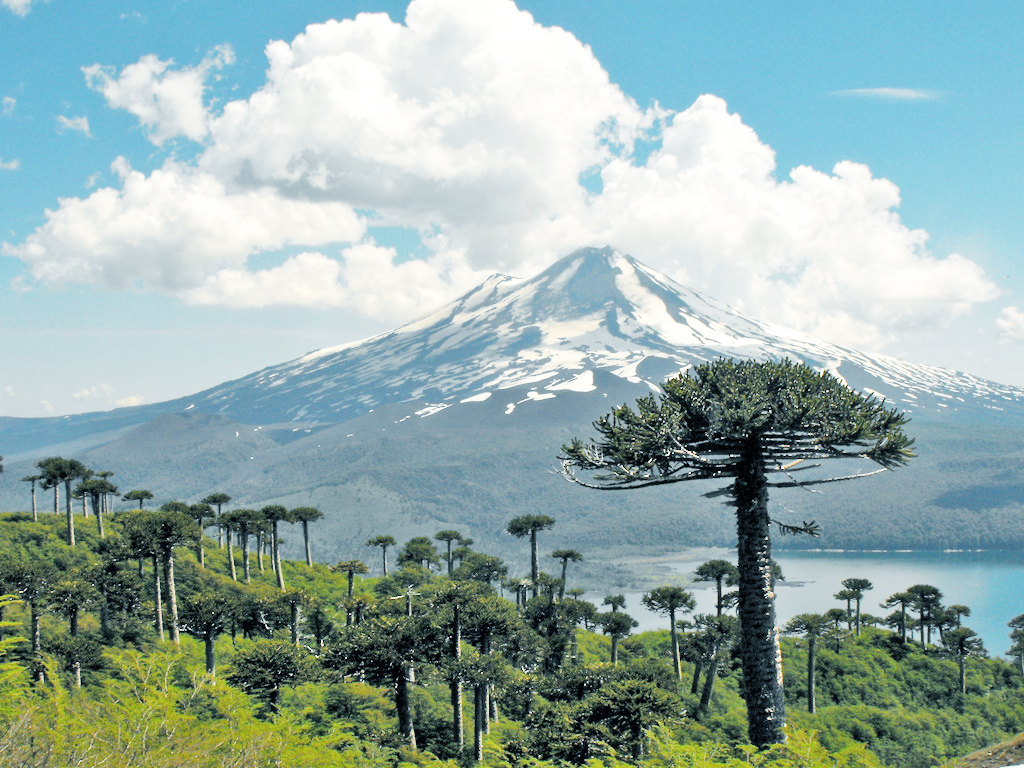
Conguillio National Park from Sierra Nevada, with the lake and the Llaima Volcano background

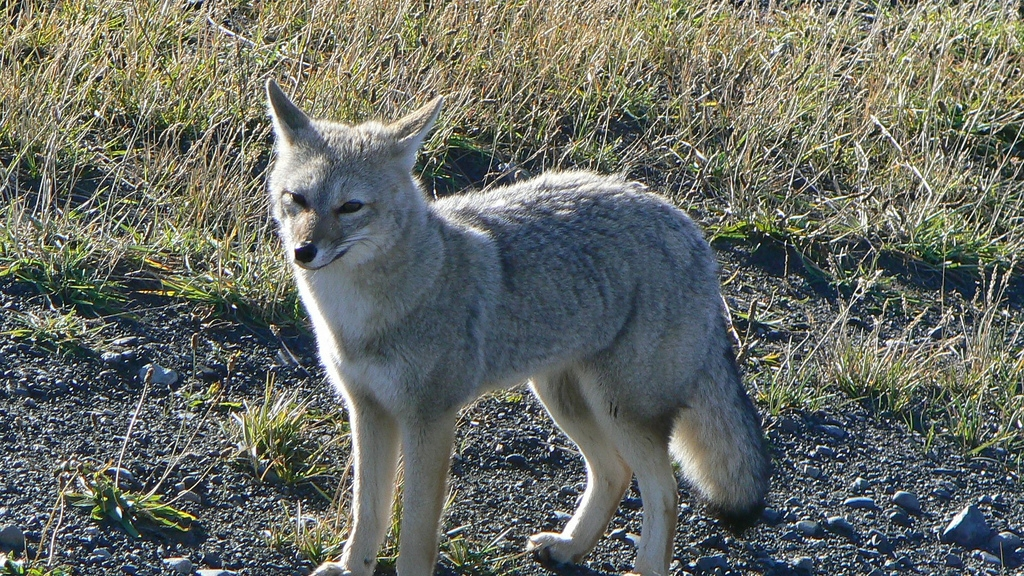
Chilla fox, common in the region

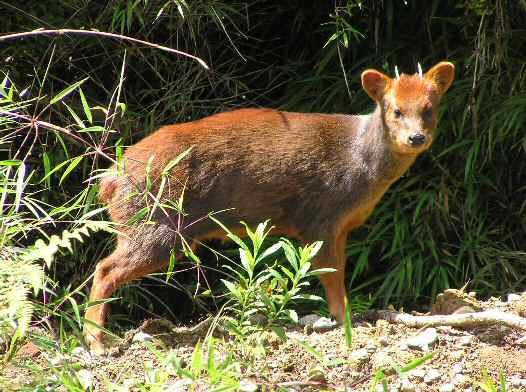
Pudú, one of the world’s smallest deer species, in grassland

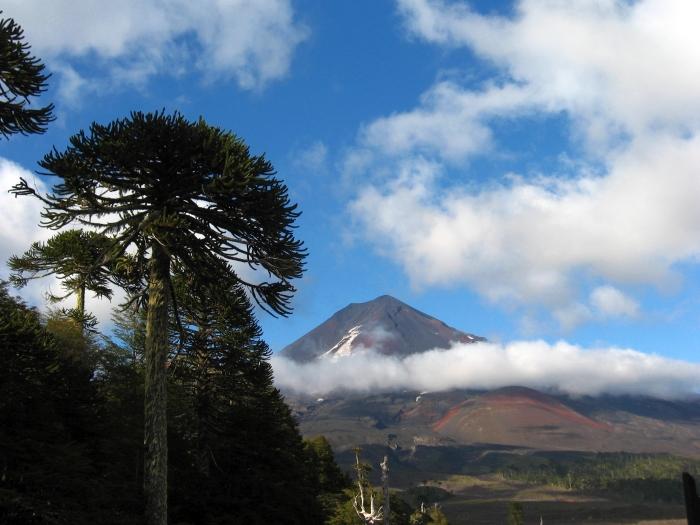
Llaima volcano post eruption 2008

Conguillío National Park is in the Andes, in the provinces of Cautín and Malleco, in the Araucanía Region of Chile also known as Region IX. Its name derives from the Mapuche word for "water with Araucaria seeds".

Among the attractions in the park are the Llaima volcano, Sierra Nevada and wild landscapes characterized by islands of vegetation completely surrounded by vast areas of lava flows and is a humid and wet area.

There are also extensive forests, formed mainly by Araucarias and Nothofagus species, and small lakes within the park.

It is also known as Los Paraguas (The Umbrellas), due to the shape of the Monkey Puzzle trees.

The park was used as a filming location for Walking with Dinosaurs, a television series produced by the BBC.

== History ==
It was declared a national park in 1950. In 1983, the park, along with Alto Bío Bío National Reserve, was designated by UNESCO as a Biosphere Reserve, which is known as Araucarias Biosphere Reserve.

The national park lies within the wider Kütralkura Geopark, which was officially recognised as part of UNESCO's Global Geoparks Network on April 17, 2019.

== Vehicle accesses ==
The park is situated 120 km east of Temuco.

- Sector Los Paraguas: This sector is accessed via the route that connects the towns of Cajón, Vilcún and Cherquenco. The road is asphalted from Cajón to Cherquenco, the rest gravel, all-weather, except snow days in which chains and four-wheel drive are required.
- Sector Conguillío: The park can be accessed from Chile Route 181, which is paved from Victoria to Curacautín. To reach the park from Curacautín, it is necessary to follow a road that is paved only in its first 10 kilometres (6.2 mi), while the rest is gravel. This access route is passable year round until the Captrén Hut, depending on snow accumulation, the rest is passable only during the summer period, from November to March.

This sector also via the paved road that goes from Lautaro to Curacautín. The remaining stretch of road until the park entrance is the same route previously mentioned.

- Sector Melipeuco: Here is located the main park entrance, which is reached via a road that begins in Temuco and that passes through the towns of Cunco and Melipeuco. The road is paved until the Truful-Truful river, the rest is gravel in fair condition and passable throughout the year to the park.

== Rivers and watersports ==
Lonquimay River flows into the Biobío river. There is a fishing spot called the Truful Truful river, which is 25 km. to the north of Melipeuco. It crosses the volcanic scoria and drains into lake Conguillío. 14 km. from Melipeuco are the Saltos del Truful Truful, in a river where rainbow trout are abundant. Swimming, rowing boats and fishing are allowed, along with motorized boats.

== The Sierra Nevada volcano ==
There are 5 lookout points on the Sierra Nevada volcano. It is a long walk, of five to six hours, but efforts are awarded with the panoramic view obtained from this height, for the flight of the condor or the Vista of the beginning point of the Blanco River.

== Llaima Volcano ==
=== Geologic characteristics of Llaima volcano ===
The Llaima volcano was formed during the Quaternary, on lava and granites located throughout the faults system of longitudinal North – South. It is composed of mixed volcano and shield, with a boiler covered with forty accidental dreg cones and consists of two summits; the higher one is 3,125 m (10,253 ft) high, and the lower one (Pichillaima) is about 2,920 m (9,580 ft) high, and is significantly less prominent than the higher northern summit. The slope of this volcano is moderate. It is active from the Superior Pleistocene, and their products are mainly pyroclastic lava and andesítico-basaltic. It has an extensive history of violent eruptions of Vulcan and bizarre type that have left remainders of fifty meters of fine sand and volcanic capes very well specified and dregs basaltic lava. Also, it presents sulfated smoker around the crater. About of the eruptions there is registry of around 37 eruptions counting of 1852, of which those of 1927 and 1957 were the most violent. This record transforms it into one of the most active volcanoes of Chile.

=== 2008 eruption ===
The last eruption of the volcano was on January 1, 2008. The park had to be evacuated, including about 150 tourists and employees of CONAF, because at 18:20 hours local time the volcano Llaima erupted. During the eruption, launched vent s and solid material to a thousand feet above the main crater, located to 3,150 meters, authorities said.

== Hiking ==
Hiking options include Sierra Nevada – Los Carpinteros- Las Araucarias – Las Vertientes and Cañón de Truful-Truful.

If you enter Conguillío National Park by the sector of the Captrén lagoon, on the road from Curacautín, there is a footpath that surrounds the entire lagoon and its extension is of 1.24 miles approximately. It is a long but light walk, apt for experience and inexperienced walkers. In the Captrén lagoon it is possible to fish, but it is prohibited to swim or to sail in boat, since it is a sanctuary for birds and this type of intervention can affect local species that inhabit there.

There is another footpath, that of the Carpenters, 3.11 miles length, that goes into the Araucarias, coigüe and lenga forests, ending at Laguna Captrén. On this route is the “Araucaria Mother” a species whose trunk has a diameter of 6.56 feet.

== Flora ==
Coigües, robles and raulíes, are present throughout the park; others, like lengas, ñirres, avellanos, maitenes, cipreses de la cordillera and lleuques, occur in the sectors Conguillío and Truful-Truful. Other species include Berberis (such as Darwin’s barberry, B. empetrifolia, Magellan and narrow-leaved barberry), Chilean fire bush, Chilean plum-yew, Chusquea sp., dog orchid, gunnera, hardy fuchsia, and Patagonian wild currant.

== Fauna ==
The local mammals in the area include the culpeo and chilla foxes, kodkod cat, monito-del-monte, puma, pudú (one of the smallest deer on earth) and the quique (a kind of weasel).

The birds found in the park include a large variety of wading birds and waterfowl, such as the Andean duck, ashy-headed goose, black-faced ibis, flying steamer-duck, lake duck, neotropic cormorant, red-gartered coot, spectacled duck, torrent duck and the yellow-billed pintail and teal. Several raptor species inhabit the area, including the Andean condor, kestrel, Chilean hawk, Chimango caracara, crested caracara, mountain caracara, peregrine falcon and the variable hawk. Also present are various woodpeckers and passerines, such as the Austral blackbird and negrito, Austral parakeet, black-chinned siskin, buff-winged cinclodes, Chilean flicker, Chilean mockingbird, Elaenias, long-tailed meadowlark, Magellanic woodpecker, Patagonian Sierra-finch, rufous-collared sparrow, striped woodpecker, white-throated treerunner and the yellow-bridled finch.

== Administration ==
The CONAF administration office is located in the Conguillío Lake sector.

== When to visit ==
The best time to visit the Conguillío National Park is between the spring and summer (November to March) when the climate is milder and the roads are in excellent conditions. During the winter, the conditions are perfect to visit the Araucarias ski center. Located in the side west of the Llaima volcano, site in opposition to the Conguillío Lake, it has two tow cables, cafeteria, ski school, equipment rental and lodging in refuge.
