= Conguillío Lake =

Lake in Chile

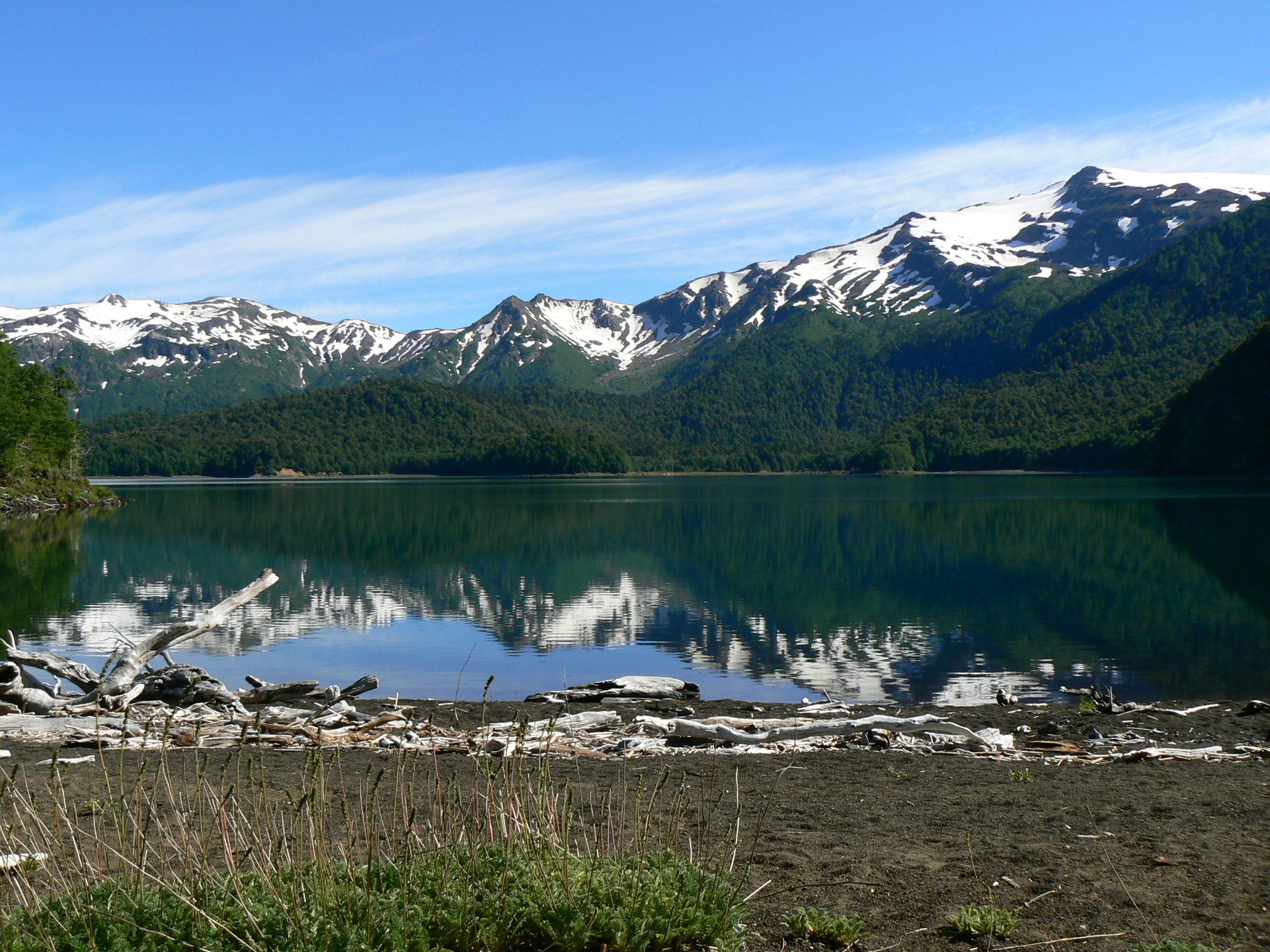
- The lake with Sierra Nevada in the background.

- Location within Chile
- Location: La Araucanía Region
- Coordinates: 38°38′S 71°38′W
- Primary outflows: Underground outflow
- Basin countries: Chile
- Surface area: 7.8 km^{2} (1,900 acres)
- Surface elevation: 1,122 m (3,681 ft) above sea level

Conguillío Lake is a lake located in the La Araucanía Region of Chile, within the Conguillío National Park. The lake was formed by the damming of the Trufultruful River caused by a lava flow from the Llaima volcano.
