= Kütralkura =

Geopark in southern Chile's Araucanía Region

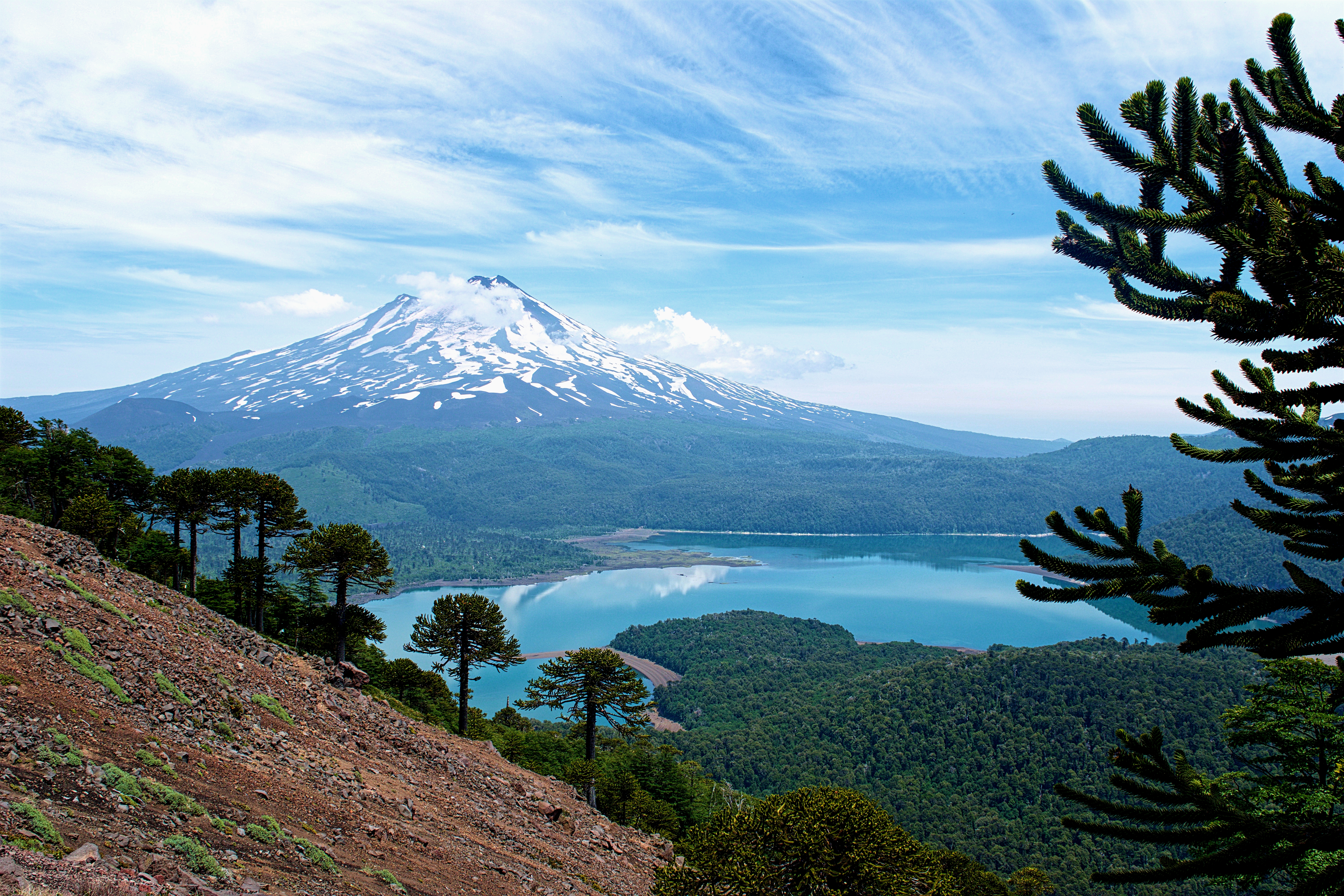
View of Conguillío Lake and Llaima Volcano, both part of Kütralkura Geopark.

Kütralkura (Spanish: Geoparque Kütralkura, from Mapudungun kütral, fire, and kura, stone, meaning "firestone") is a geopark in southern Chile's Araucanía Region. The geopark has an area of 12,070 km^{2} and lies mostly in the Andes. It spans seven communes: Curacautín, Lonquimay, Lautaro, Vilcún, Melipeuco, Cunco and Curarrehue. All of Conguillio National Park and Llaima, one of Chile's most active volcanoes, lie within the geopark.

By May 17, 2018, Kütralkura was being considered for inclusion in the Global Geoparks Network. The inclusion in the network was confirmed and accepted on April 17, 2019, by UNESCO's executive board. The original geopark project was carried out and supported by the National Geology and Mining Service and CORFO.

The work done at Kütralkura is being used as template for a similar initiative in Palena Province.
