= Trufultruful River =

River in Chile

Coordinates: 38.85121°S 71.67132°W

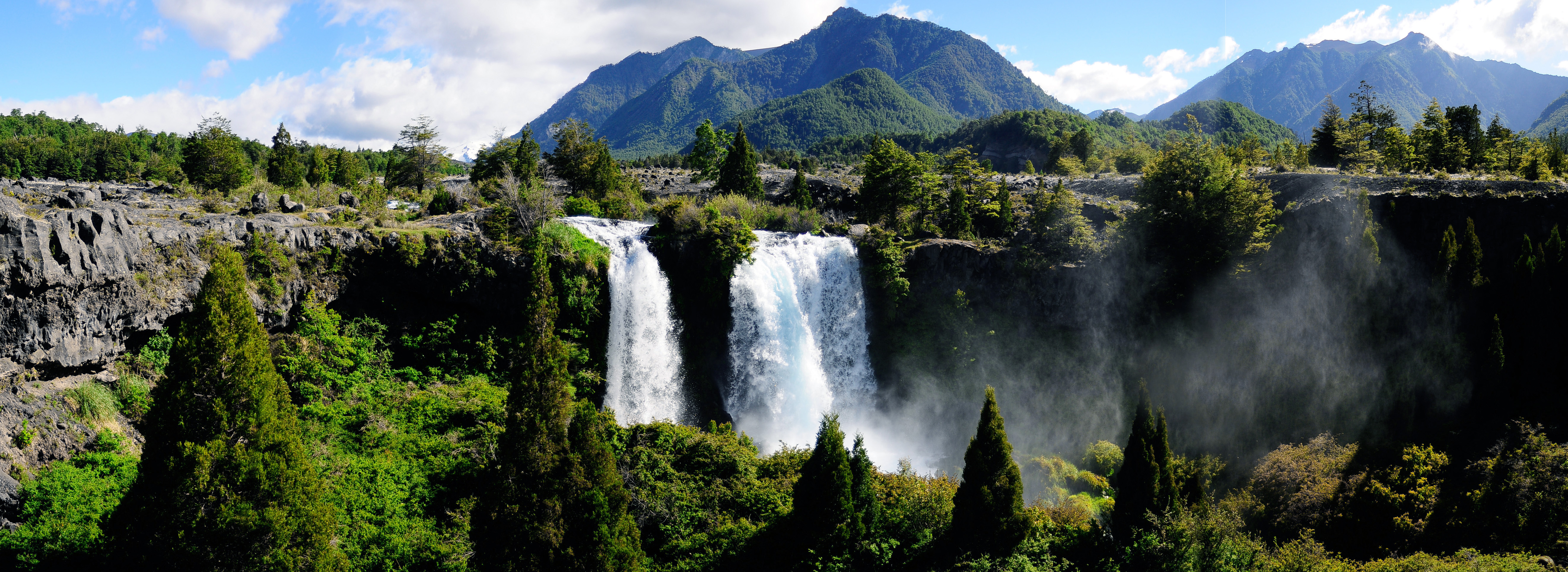
- Truful-Truful Falls

Location
- Country: Chile

Physical characteristics
- Source
  - location: Laguna Verde
- Mouth
  - location: Allipén River

Trufultruful River (also spelled Truful-Truful) is a river located in the La Araucanía Region of Chile. It flows south a few kilometres from its source, the Laguna Verde, to join the Zahuelhue River, forming the Allipén River at Melipeuco. A great part of its course is contained within Conguillío National Park and drains the east slope of Llaima volcano. Truful-Truful Falls occurs on the river.
