= Uvilla =

Uvilla (Spanish, "little grape") is a name that has been used for a number of different plants:

- Coccoloba costata
- Physalis peruviana
- Pourouma cecropiifolia
- Ribes magellanicum

It can also refer to the following places:

- La Uvilla, Dominican Republic
- La Uvilla, Honduras
- Uvilla, West Virginia
