= Lonquimay River =

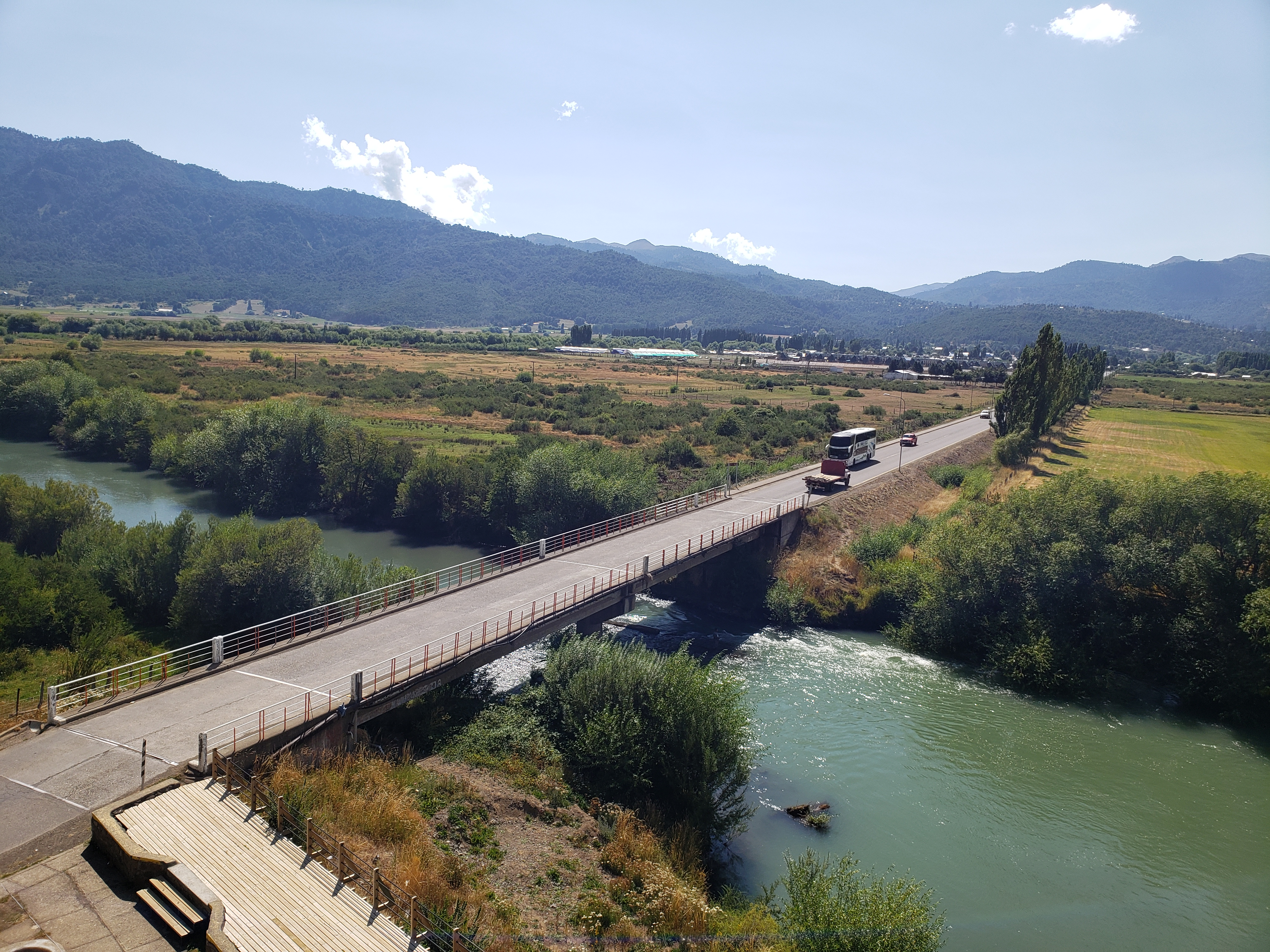

Physical characteristics
- Mouth: Biobío River
  - coordinates: 38°26′07″S 71°13′54″W

Lonquimay River is a river of the Araucanía Region of Chile. It originates from glaciers of the Sierra Nevada volcano, runs generally northeast past the town of Lonquimay, and is a tributary of the Biobío River.
