= Allipén River =

River in Chile

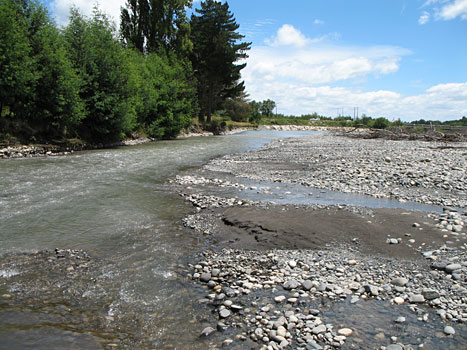

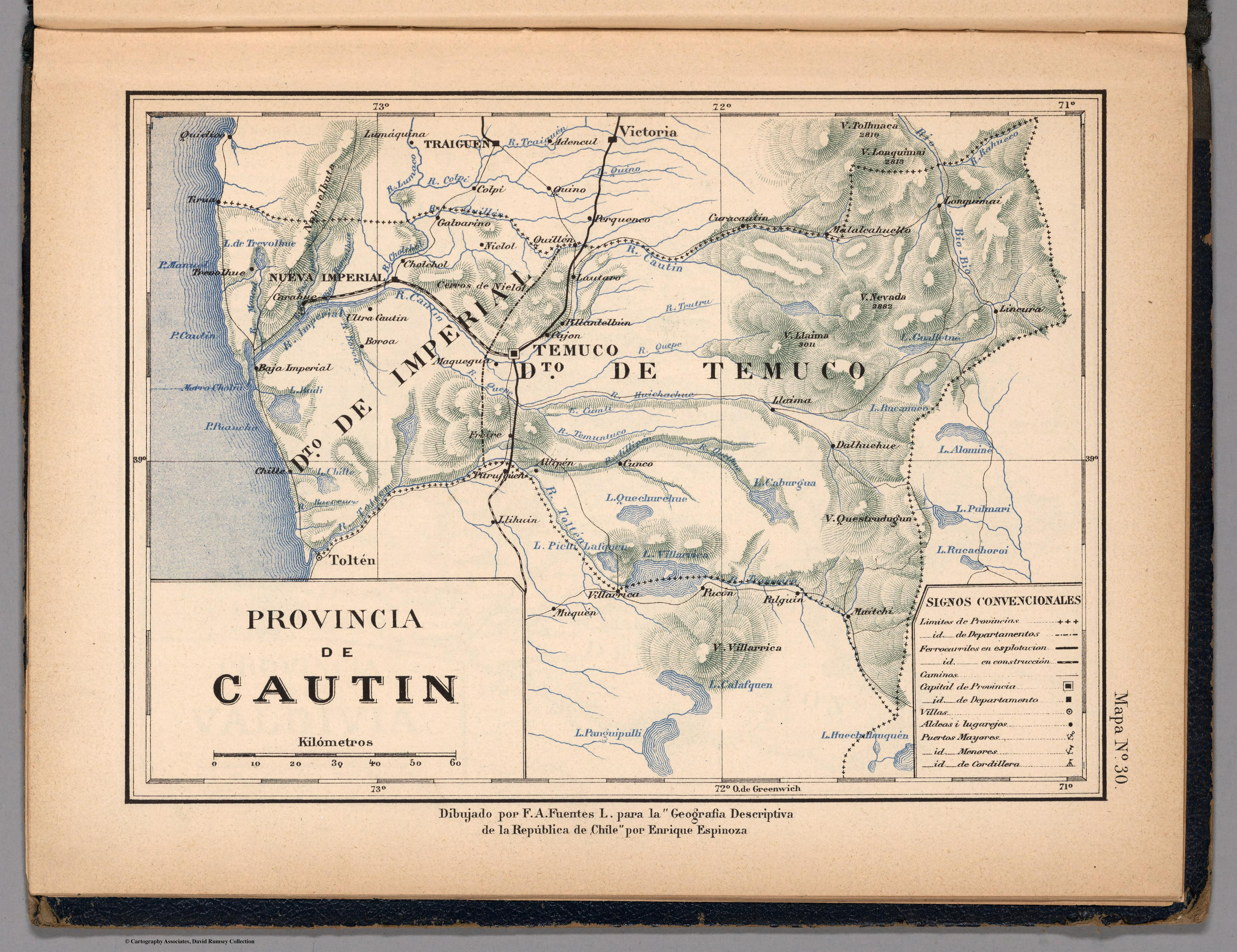
- Allipen River, in the middle of a 1903 map

Location
- Country: Chile

Physical characteristics
- Mouth: Toltén River
  - coordinates: 39°00′50″S 72°31′17″W
- Length: 108 km (67 mi)
- Basin size: 2,325 km^{2} (898 sq mi)

Allipén River is a river located in the La Araucanía Region of Chile. It is formed at the junction of the rivers Trufultruful and Zahuelhue, near Melipeuco. The basin of the river comprises approximately 36 percent of the Conguillío National Park surface area (including a 5-km-wide buffer zone around the park).

Allipén's main tributary is Curaco River, which receives the waters of Colico Lake through the river of the same name.
