= Codonorchis canisioi =

Scientific classification
- Kingdom: Plantae
- Clade: Tracheophytes
- Clade: Angiosperms
- Clade: Monocots
- Order: Asparagales
- Family: Orchidaceae
- Subfamily: Orchidoideae
- Genus: Codonorchis
- Species: C. canisioi

Binomial name
- Codonorchis canisioi Mansf.

Species of flowering plant

Codonorchis canisioi is an orchid in the subfamily Orchidoideae. It is a tuberous geophyte native to Rio Grande do Sul in southern Brazil.
