= Araucarias Biosphere Reserve =

Biosphere reserve in the Andes in Chile

Coordinates: 38.6667°S 71.3333°W

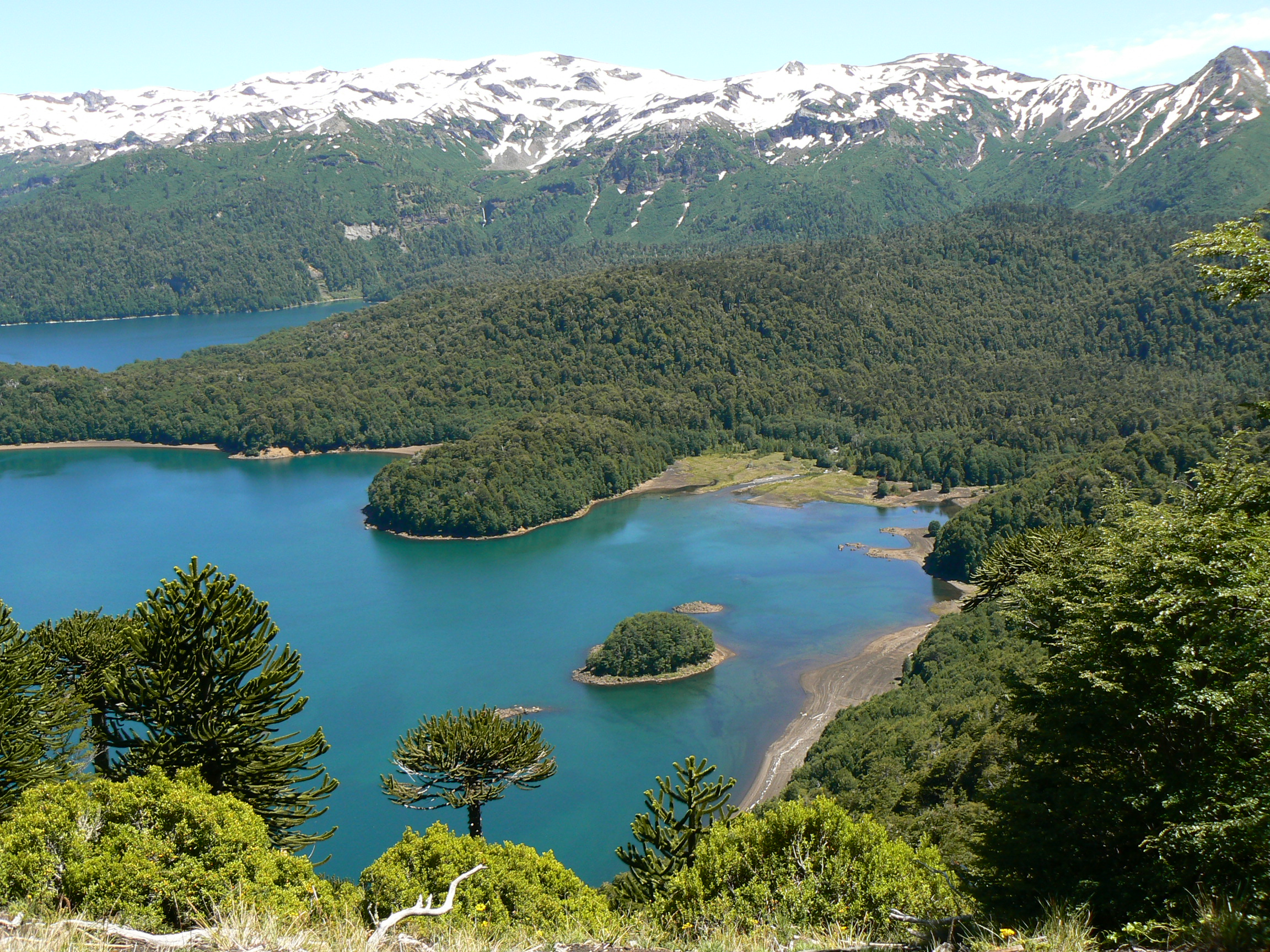
A lake in the park

The Araucarias Biosphere Reserve is located in the Andes range, in south-central Chile. It comprises the Conguillío National Park and the Alto Bío-Bío National Reserve. The main feature of this Biosphere Reserve is the massive presence of Araucarias .

== See also ==
- List of environment topics
- World Network of Biosphere Reserves

== References and external links ==
- Araucarias Biosphere Reserve
- https://web.archive.org/web/20061107144912/http://www.sernatur.cl/Areas_Silvestres/Araucania/Araucania.html
