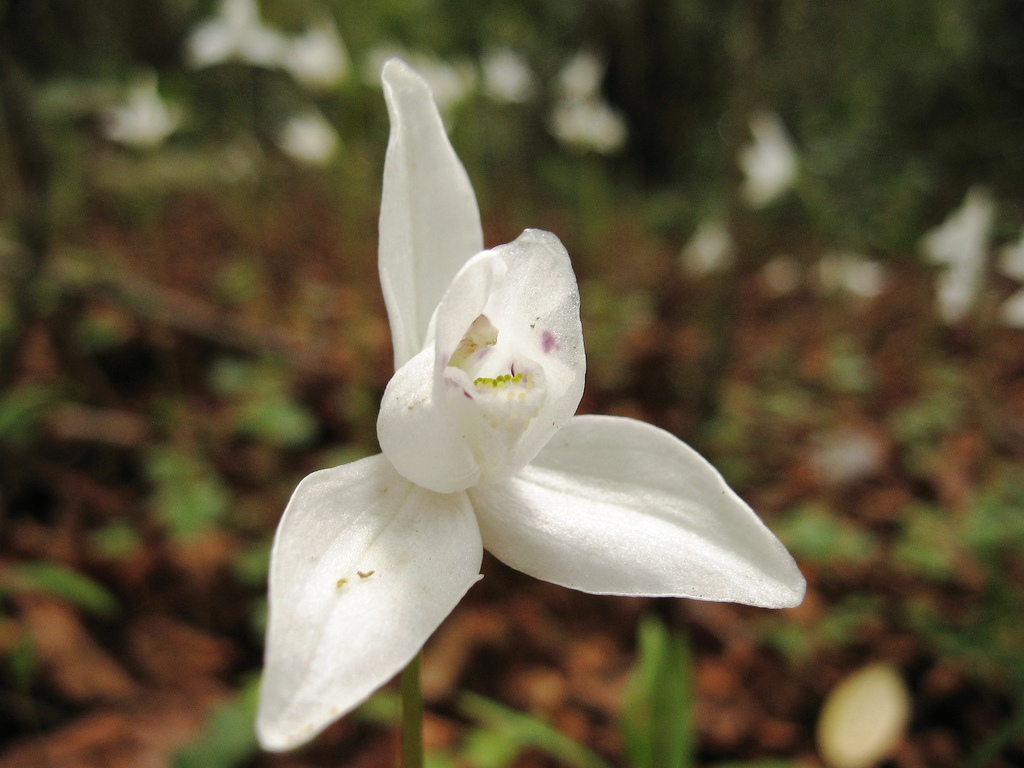
- Codonorchis lessonii

Scientific classification
- Kingdom: Plantae
- Clade: Tracheophytes
- Clade: Angiosperms
- Clade: Monocots
- Order: Asparagales
- Family: Orchidaceae
- Subfamily: Orchidoideae
- Tribe: Codonorchideae; P.J.Cribb
- Genus: Codonorchis; Lindl.

= Codonorchis =

Genus of orchids

Codonorchis is a genus of flowering plants from the orchid family, Orchidaceae. There are two known species:

- Codonorchis canisioi Mansf. - Brazil (State of Rio Grande do Sul)
- Codonorchis lessonii (d'Urv.) Lindl. - Argentina, Chile, Falkland Islands

== See also ==
- List of Orchidaceae genera
