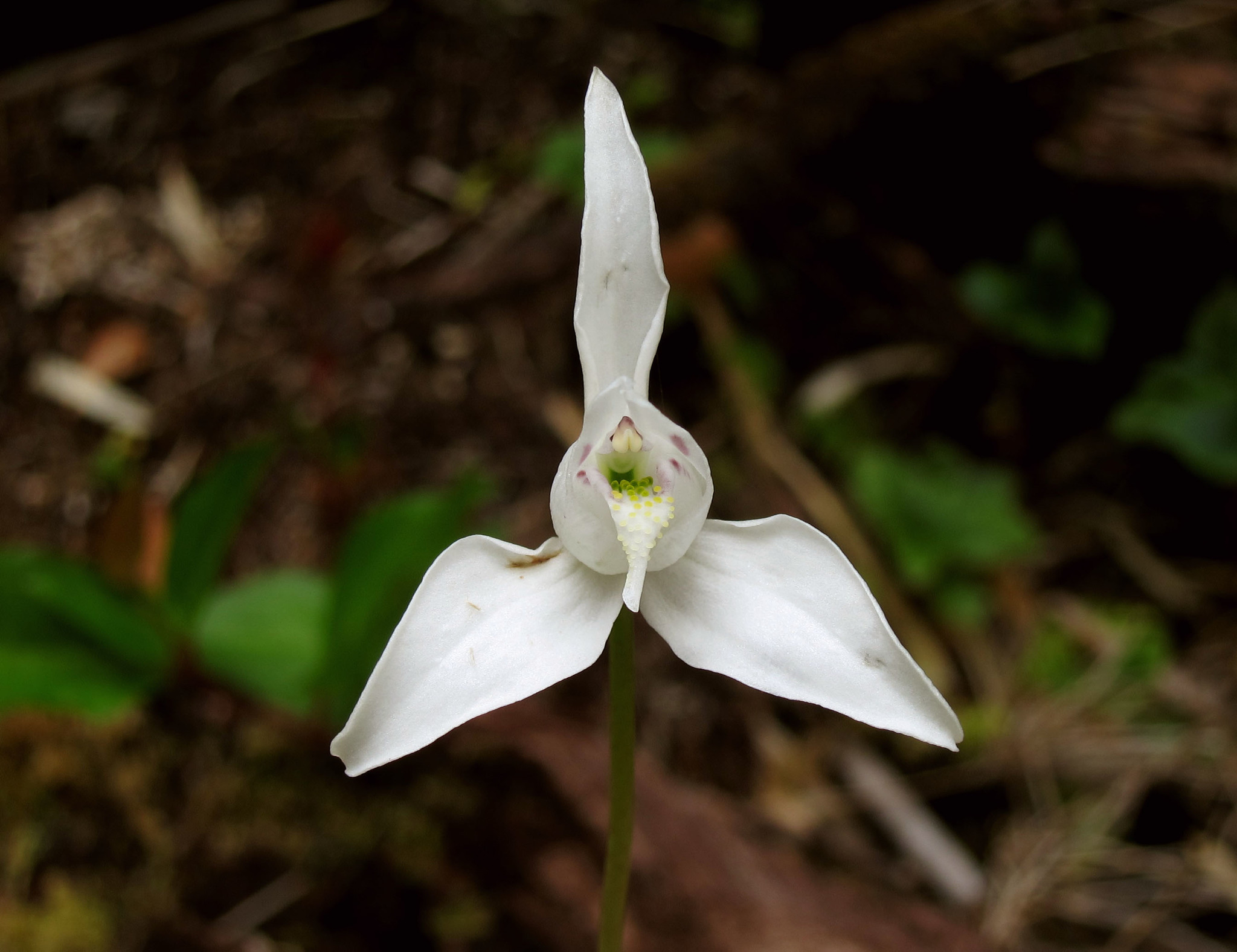

Scientific classification
- Kingdom: Plantae
- Clade: Tracheophytes
- Clade: Angiosperms
- Clade: Monocots
- Order: Asparagales
- Family: Orchidaceae
- Subfamily: Orchidoideae
- Genus: Codonorchis
- Species: C. lessonii

Binomial name
- Codonorchis lessonii (Brongn.) Lindl.

= Codonorchis lessonii =

Species of flowering plant

Codonorchis lessonii is a species of orchid. This species is native to Chile and Argentina. In Chile, it is found between the Maule and Magallanes regions. Its common names in English include Palomita Orchid (palomita means "little dove" in Spanish) and Dog Orchid. In Central-South Chile, this species engages in mycorrhizal symbiosis with fungi from the families Ceratobasidiaceae and Tulasnellaceae.
