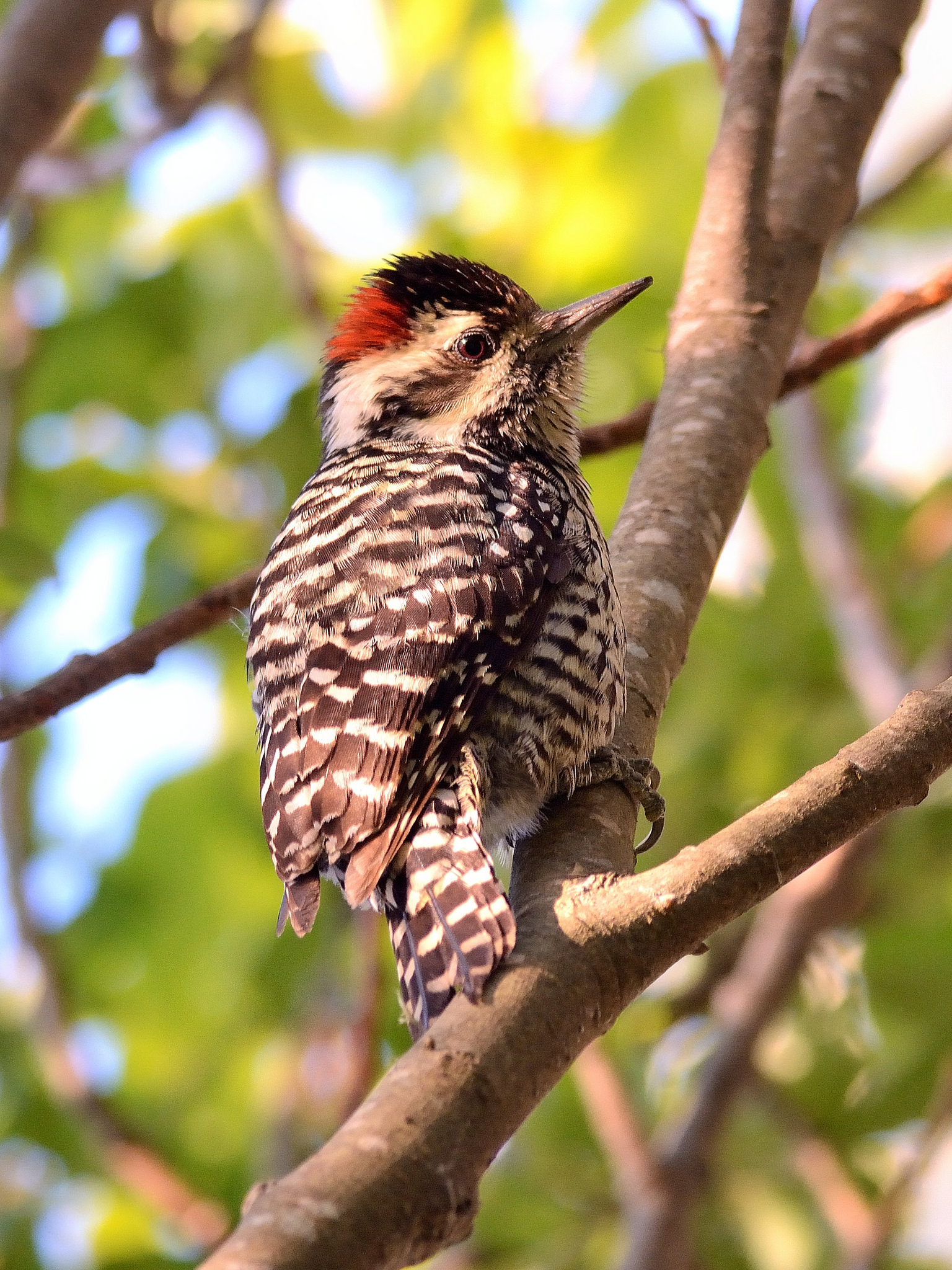
- at Tomé, Bío Bío, Chile

Conservation status
- Least Concern (IUCN 3.1)

Scientific classification
- Kingdom: Animalia
- Phylum: Chordata
- Class: Aves
- Order: Piciformes
- Family: Picidae
- Genus: Veniliornis
- Species: V. lignarius

Binomial name
- Veniliornis lignarius (Molina, 1782)

Synonyms
- Dyctiopicus lignarius; Dendrocopos lignarius; Picoides lignarius

= Striped woodpecker =

Species of bird

The striped woodpecker (Veniliornis lignarius) is a species of bird in subfamily Picinae of the woodpecker family Picidae. It is found in Argentina, Bolivia, and Chile.

== Taxonomy and systematics ==
The striped woodpecker was originally described as Picus Lignarius. It was later placed in Dyctiopicus, which was merged into Dendrocopos, which in turn was merged into Picoides where it and its sister species the checkered woodpecker (V. mixtus) were considered outliers. In 2006, Moore et al. published research on mtDNA COI and Cyt b sequences which suggested that the two belong in genus Veniliornis. That treatment is now (2023) followed by the International Ornithological Committee and BirdLife International's Handbook of the Birds of the World. However, starting in 2018, the American Ornithological Society and the Clements taxonomy moved all species of genus Veniliornis into genus Dryobates. In addition, there have been suggestions that the striped and checkered woodpeckers are conspecific.

The striped woodpecker is treated as monotypic by all of the above taxonomic systems. However, the population in Bolivia differs in several ways from that further south and may deserve to be treated as a subspecies or species V. (or D.) (lignarius) puncticeps.

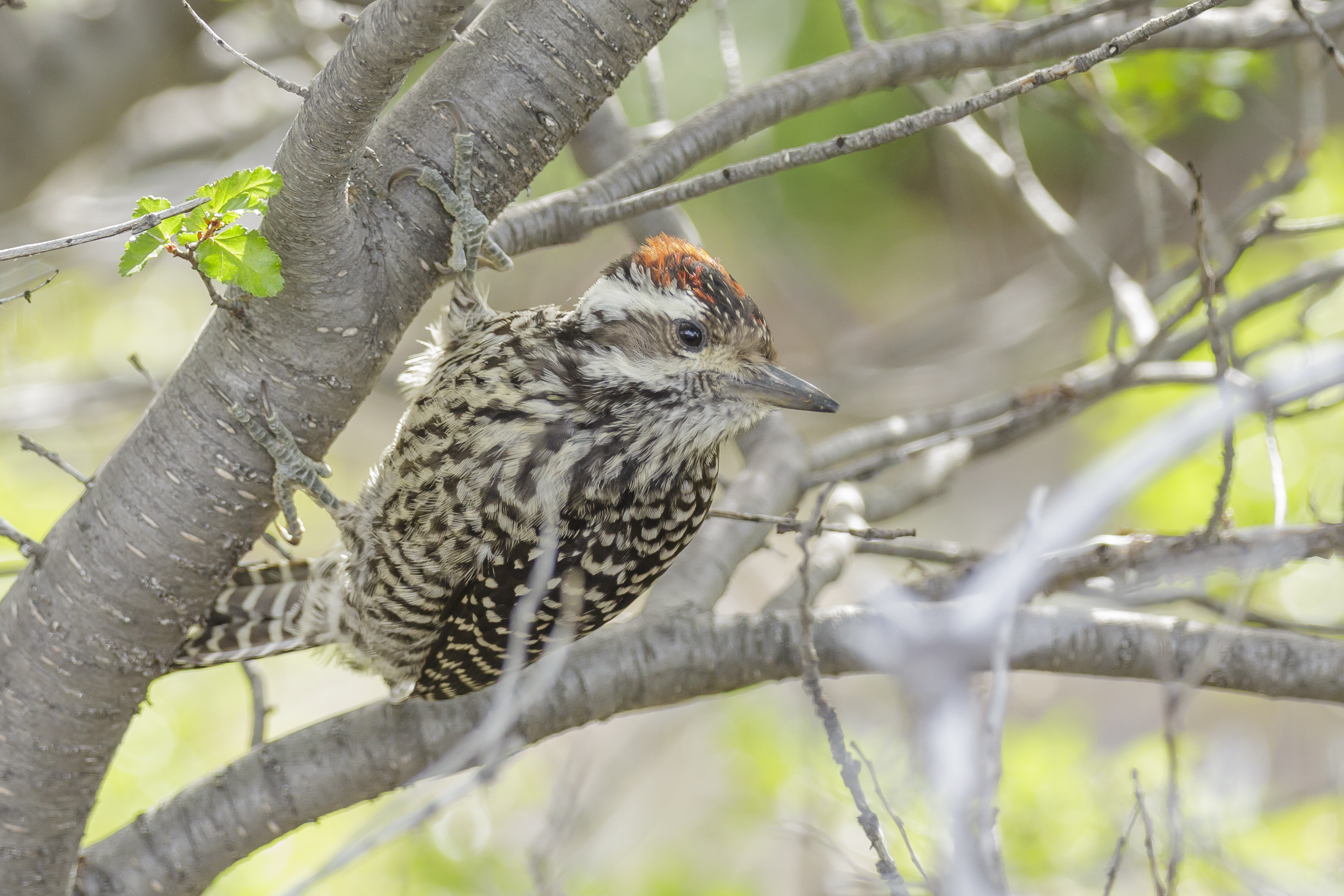
at Torres del Paine National Park, Chile

== Description ==
The striped woodpecker is 15 to 16 cm (5.9 to 6.3 in) long and weighs 35 to 39 g (1.2 to 1.4 oz). Males and females have the same plumage except on their heads. Adults of both sexes have a black forehead and crown, a blackish hindneck, and a generally white face with a blackish stripe back and down from the eye and a black malar stripe. Males have some streaks or spots on the crown and a red to orange-red nape. The female's nape is black where the male's is red and its crown usually is solid black. Both sexes' upperparts are brownish black, with white scallops on northern birds and narrow white bars on southern ones. Their flight feathers are barred black and white. Their tail is dark brownish black with narrow white or buff-white bars. Their underparts are white with a yellow or buff tinge, and black streaks on the breast and belly and black bars on the flanks and undertail coverts. Juveniles are duller and browner than adults, with irregular bars on their upperparts and heavy streaks and bars on their underparts. Males have a red crown and females a small red patch on the crown.

== Distribution and habitat ==
The striped woodpecker has two disjunct populations. One is in west-central and southern Bolivia and extreme northern Argentina. The other is in central and southern Chile and southwestern Argentina. It inhabits a variety of landscapes, most of them semi-open to open forest. They include moist to humid forests dominated by Nothofagus or Podocarpus, Polylepis woodland, and dryer areas with cacti and scattered trees. In the north it also occurs in the interior of mature wet forest with watercourses, and both north and south occurs in lightly treed pastures, orchards and plantations, and gardens. In elevation it ranges between 1,600 and 4,000 m (5,200 and 13,100 ft) in Bolivia but only up to 1,800 m (5,900 ft) in Chile and 2,700 m (8,900 ft) in Argentina.

== Behavior ==
=== Movement ===
The striped woodpecker is a year-round resident throughout its range but for some elevational changes between winter and summer. Reports of northward winter migration from the south appear to be inaccurate.

=== Feeding ===
The striped woodpecker usually forages alone but occasionally joins mixed-species feeding flocks. Its diet has not been defined in detail but it is known to feed on adult and larval insects. It takes its food mainly by gleaning and probing but also pecks and hammers to reach below the substrate surface.

=== Breeding ===
The striped woodpecker is believed to nest between June and September in Bolivia and between October and January in Chile and Argentina. It excavates a nest cavity in a tree or cactus, typically between about 2 and 12 m (7 and 40 ft) above the ground. The clutch size is three to five eggs; the incubation period and time to fledging are not known. Both sexes provision nestlings.

=== Vocalization ===
The striped woodpecker makes a loud "peek" and also a "trill as [a] long-distance call".

== Status ==
The IUCN has assessed the striped woodpecker as being of Least Concern. It has a large range, and though its population size is not known it is believed to be stable. No immediate threats have been identified. It occurs in several national parks in Chile and Argentina but is poorly known and "requires study".
