= Sierra Nevada (stratovolcano) =

Mountain in Chile

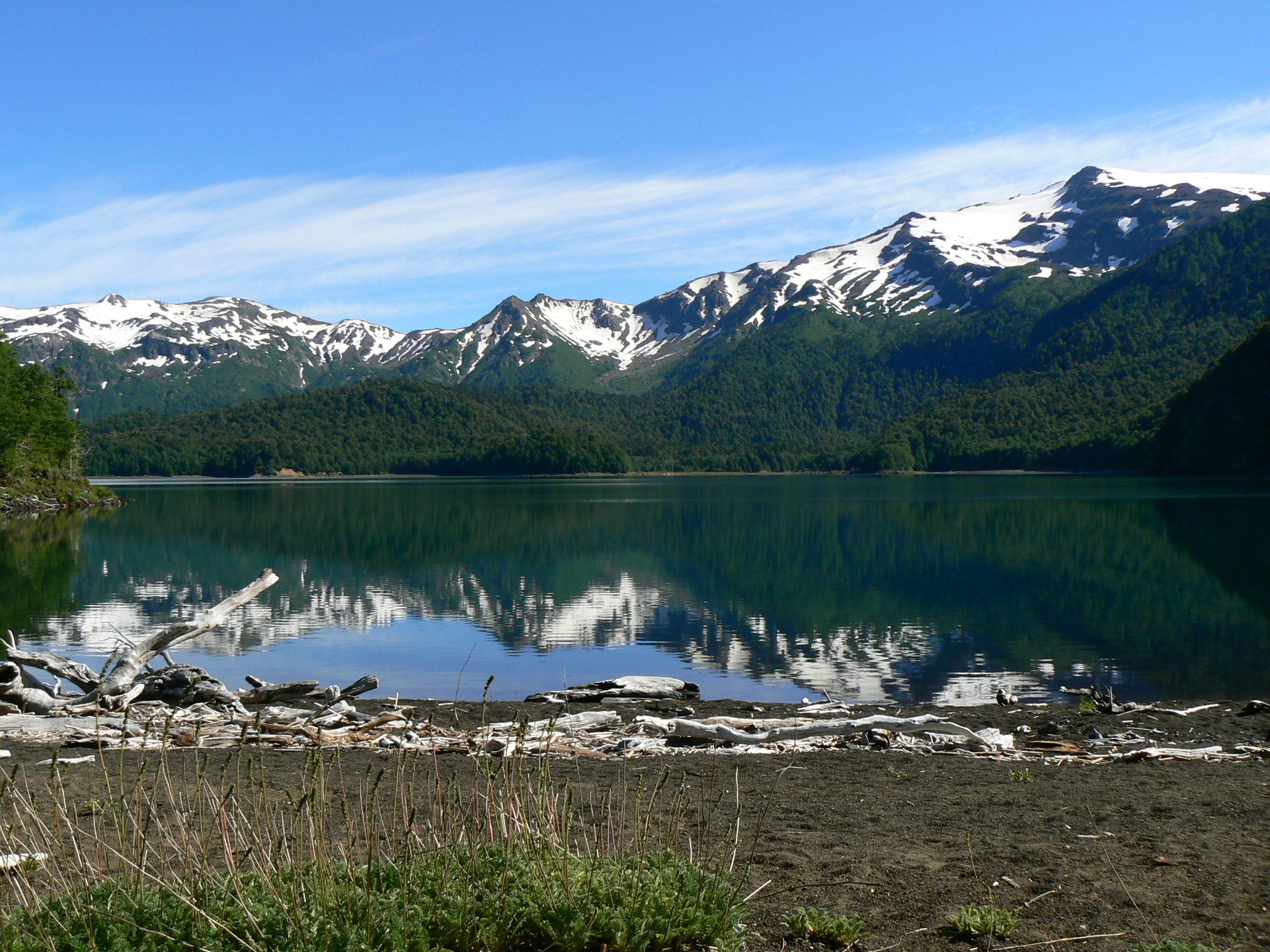
- Sierra Nevada and Lake Conguillío.

Highest point
- Elevation: 2,554 m (8,379 ft)
- Coordinates: 38°35′S 71°35′W

Geography
- Location: Chile
- Parent range: Andes

Geology
- Mountain type: Stratovolcano
- Last eruption: Unknown

Sierra Nevada is a stratovolcano located in the La Araucanía Region of Chile, near the Llaima volcano. Its last certain eruptions were in the Pleistocene period, but its activity may extend into the Holocene. Its primary lavas are andesitic and basaltic flows, although it has also produced pyroclastic flows. Lahars are also a hazard of this volcano. This stratovolcano is located in Conguillío National Park.

== See also ==
- List of volcanoes in Chile

== Sources ==
- González-Ferrán, Oscar (1995). Volcanes de Chile. Santiago, Chile: Instituto Geográfico Militar. pp. 386–8. ISBN 956-202-054-1. (in Spanish; also includes volcanoes of Argentina, Bolivia, and Peru)
