= Alto Bío Bío National Reserve =

Alto Biobío National Reserve
- IUCN category IV (habitat/species management area)
- Location within Chile
- Location: La Araucanía Region, Chile
- Nearest city: Lonquimay
- Coordinates: 38°37′26″S 70°57′54″W
- Area: 350 km^{2} (140 mi^{2})
- Established: 1912
- Governing body: Corporación Nacional Forestal

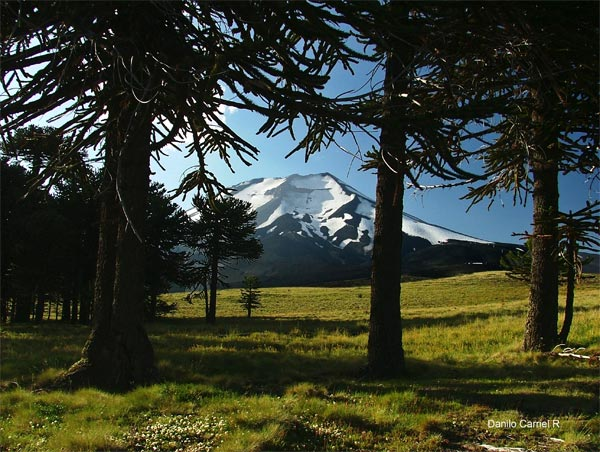
Summer in Lonquimay

Alto Biobío National Reserve is a nature reserve located in the easternmost portion of Upper Bío-Bío River basin, in the La Araucanía Region, Chile. The vegetation is dominated by Andean steppe with scattered Araucaria trees.

Alto Biobío National Reserve is part of the Araucarias Biosphere Reserve.

The reserve is crossed by the route that connects Chile and Argentina via Pino Hachado Pass.
