= Llaima =

Mountain in Chile

- Yaima
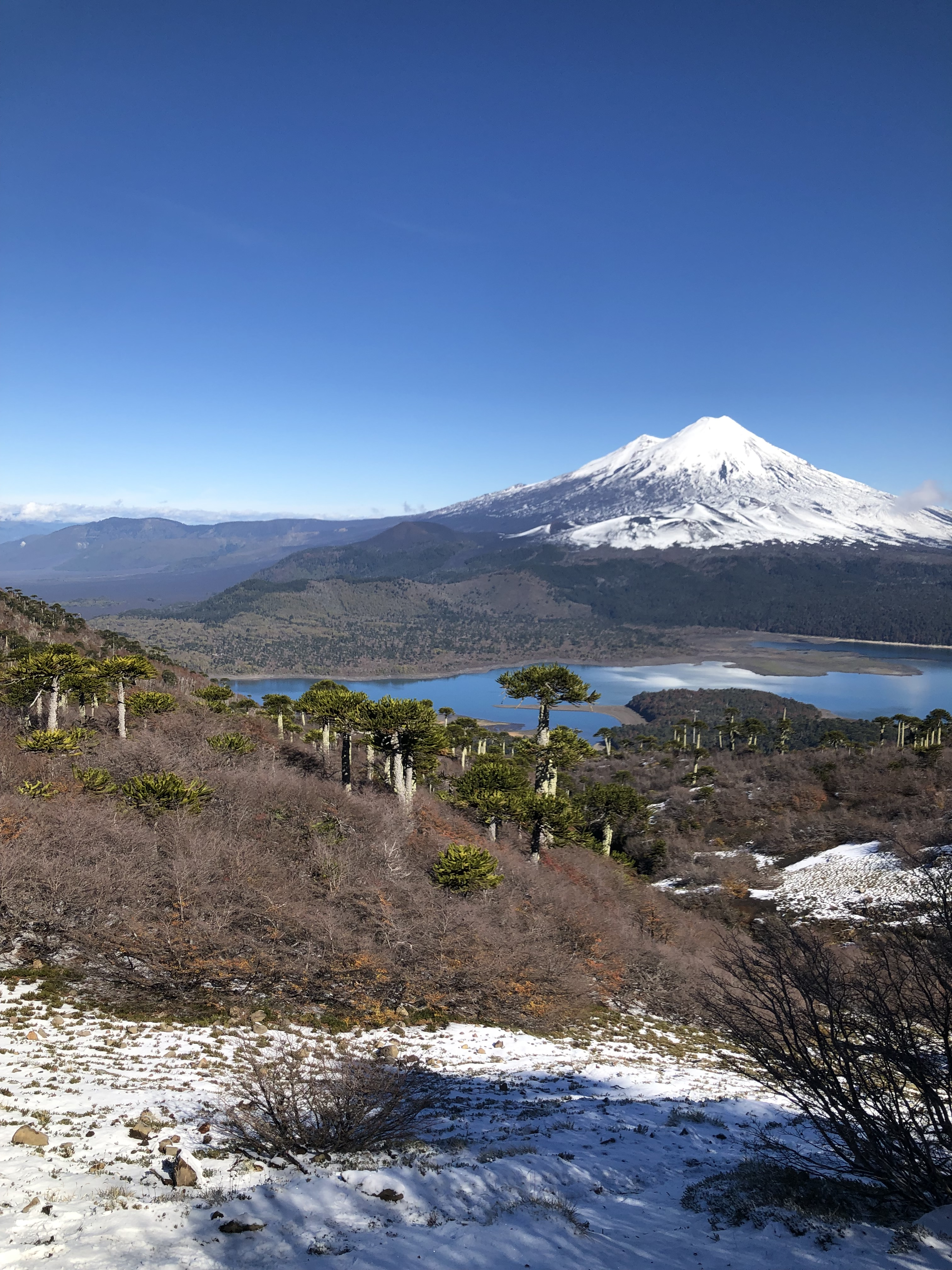
- View of the Llaima volcano (2026)

Highest point
- Elevation: 3,125 m (10,253 ft)
- Prominence: 1,819 m (5,968 ft)
- Listing: Region high point Ultra
- Coordinates: 38°41′45″S 71°43′54″W

Geography
- Location within Chile
- Location: Melipeuco and Vilcún, Cautín Province, La Araucanía Region, Chile
- Parent range: Andes

Geology
- Mountain type: Stratovolcano
- Last eruption: 2008 to 2009

The Llaima Volcano is one of the largest and most active volcanoes in Chile. It is situated 82 km East of Temuco and 663 km South of Santiago, within the borders of Conguillío National Park.

== Geography ==
The top of Llaima consists of two summits; the lower of the two, Pichillaima, is about 2,920 m (9,580 ft) high and is significantly less prominent than the higher northern summit.

The average elevation of the terrain around Llaima is about 740 m asl.

The volcano summit is located 10 km West South West of Conguillío Lake. Its slopes are drained by the rivers Captrén, Quepe and Trufultruful. The former ones are tributaries of Cautín River and the latter is affluent of Allipén River.

== Eruptions ==
Llaima is one of Chile's most active volcanoes and has frequent but moderate eruptions. Llaima's activity has been documented since the 17th century, and consists of several separate episodes of moderate explosive eruptions with occasional lava flows. A 1640 eruption is thought to have contributed to a pause in the Arauco War between the Spanish and Mapuches established at the Parliament of Quillín in 1641. Possibly Mapuches interpreted the eruption as a signal sent from spirits known as pillanes.

An 1874–76 eruption caused various lava flows, landslides, lahars, and the fall of volcanic ash. After this eruption the volcano became known as Llaima or Yaima. Prior to that it had been known as Chañel a Mapuche word in reference to the pointy shape of its summit before the eruption.

The last major eruption occurred in 1994. An eruption on January 1, 2008, forced the evacuation of hundreds of people from nearby villages. A column of smoke approximately 3000 m high was observed. An amateur caught the early eruption phase on video. The volcanic ash expelled by Llaima travelled east over the Andes into Argentina. Ash fall was recorded in the area of Zapala, Neuquén Province, and forced the cancellation of flights to and from Presidente Perón Airport near the city of Neuquén. On July 2, 2008, another eruption resulted in evacuation of 40 people from a 15 km exclusion zone.

An eruption occurred on April 5, 2009, with pyroclastic flows, ash and lava seen on the slopes.

=== Future eruptions ===
For the 2010–30 period an eruption of Volcanic Explosivity Index 2 or more is expected based on statistics. As of 2020 such eruption has not happened. Research that models the internal architecture of the volcano indicate that Llaima has reached its maximum height and that any large eruption of lava will likely occur from flank vents and not from the summit.

== Recreation ==
The ski center Las Araucarias lies on the volcano's western slopes. There are also some tours that go throughout the day.

== Gallery ==
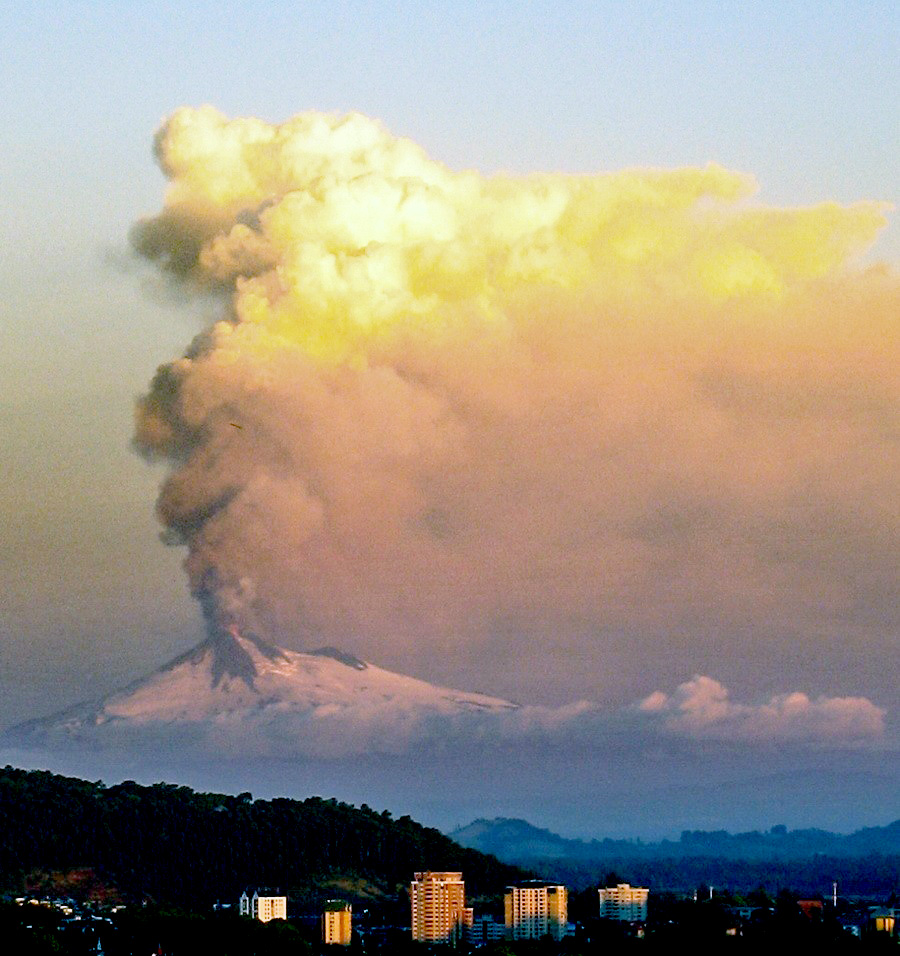
January 2008 Llaima eruption

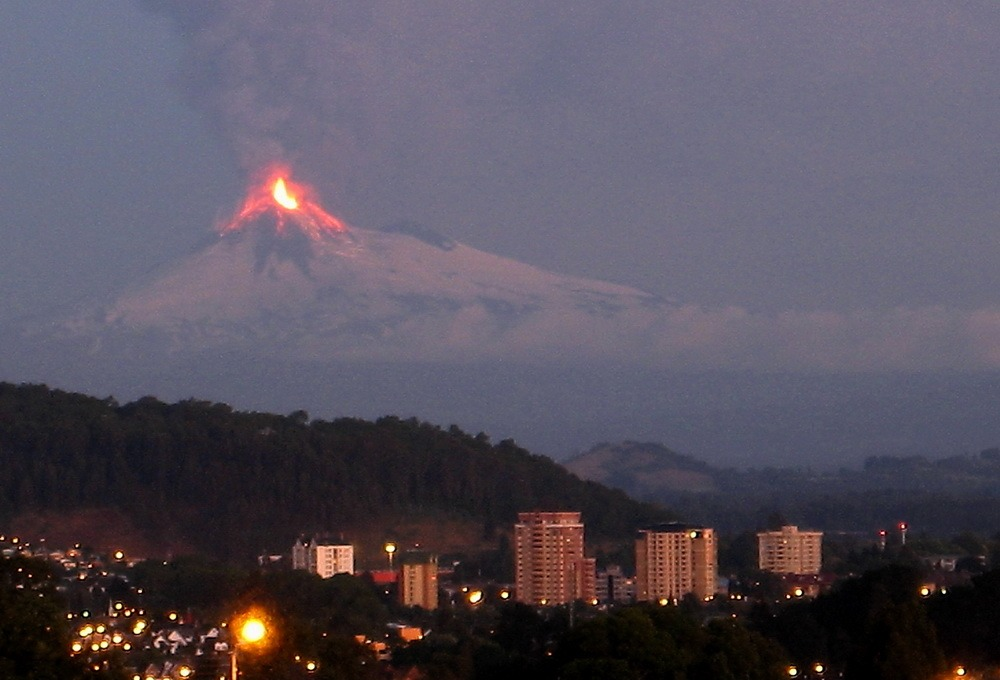
January 2008 Llaima eruption

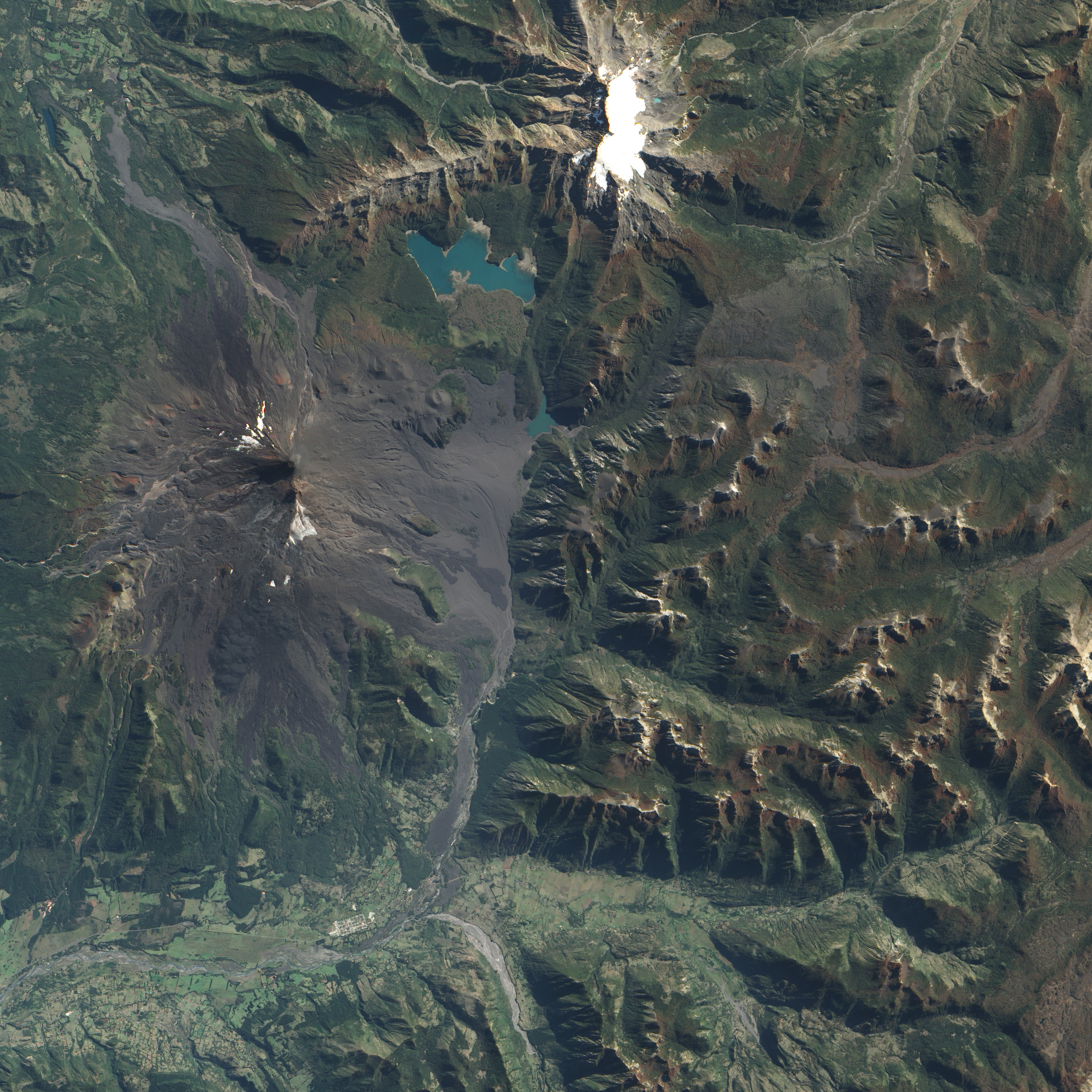
The April 2009 eruption seen from space

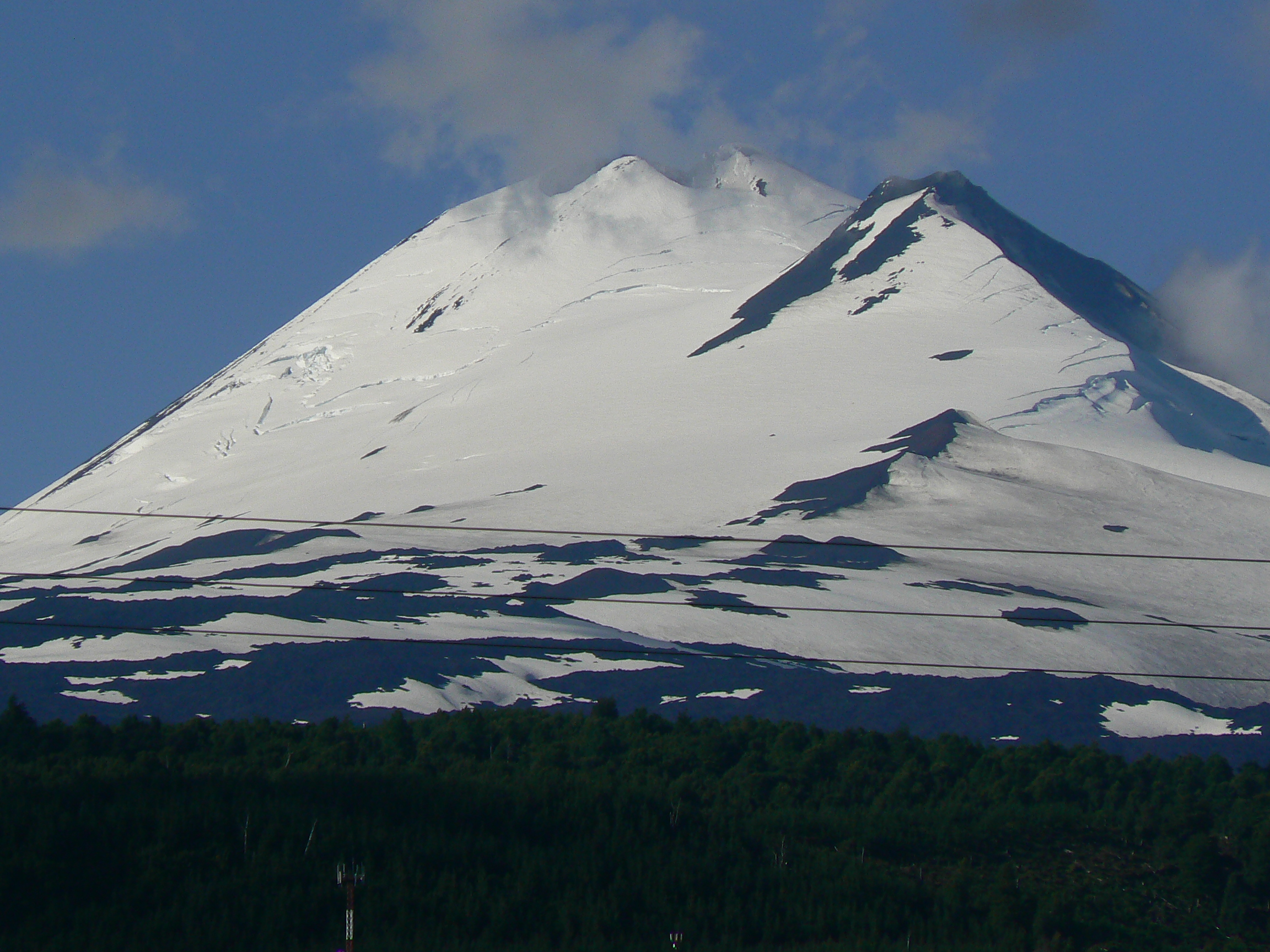
Summit of Llaima volcano

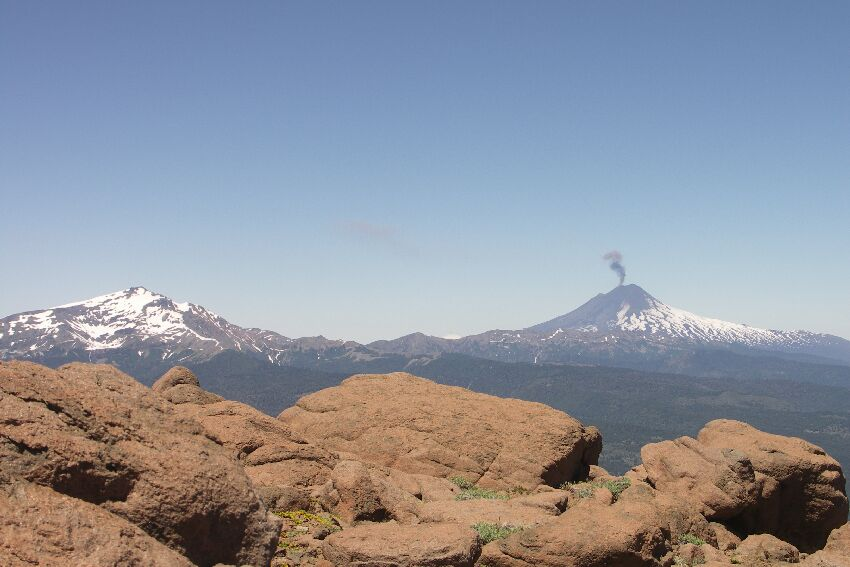
Llaima volcano a few days after the January 2008 eruption

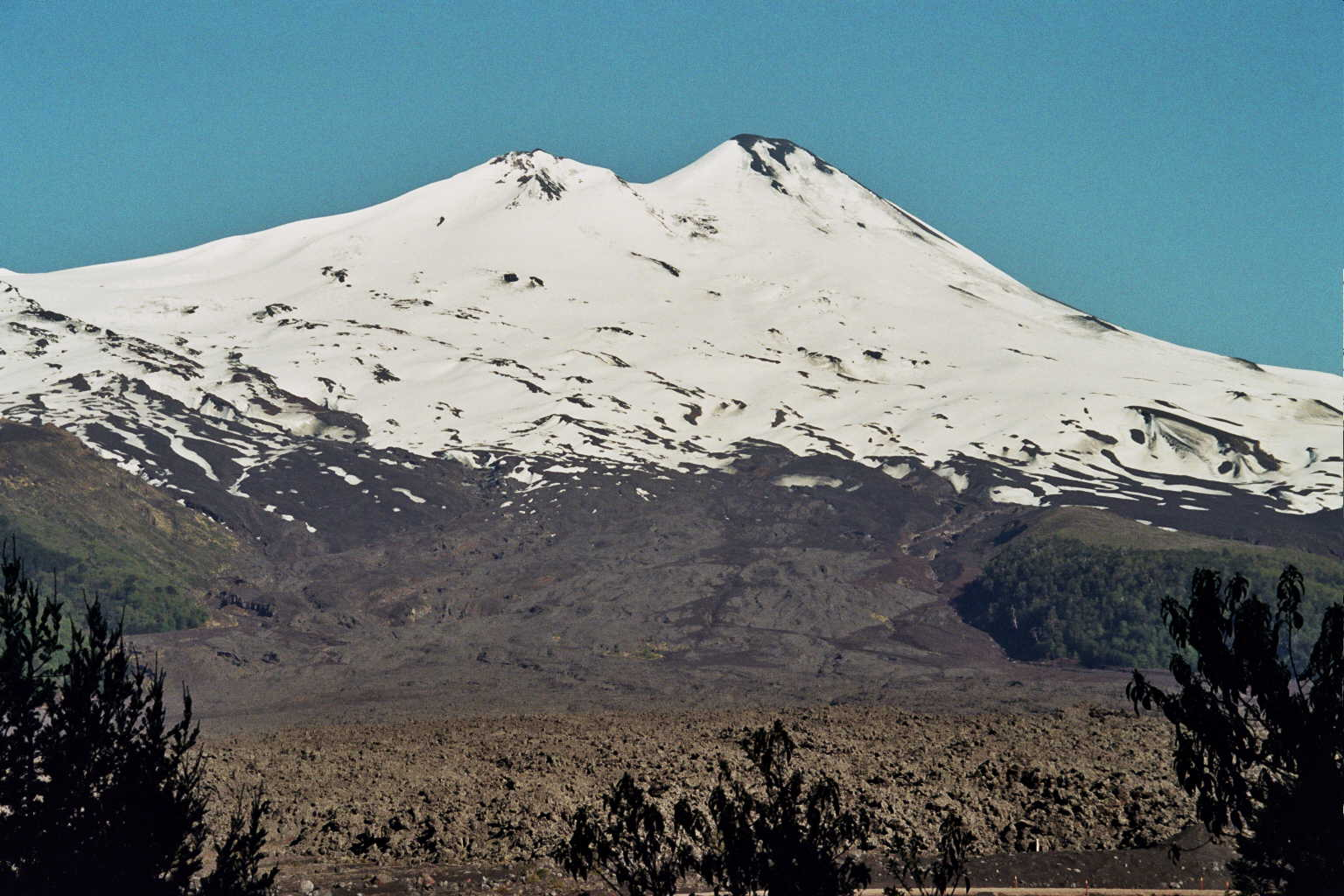
Llaima volcano with a blanket of snow covering its solidified lava flows

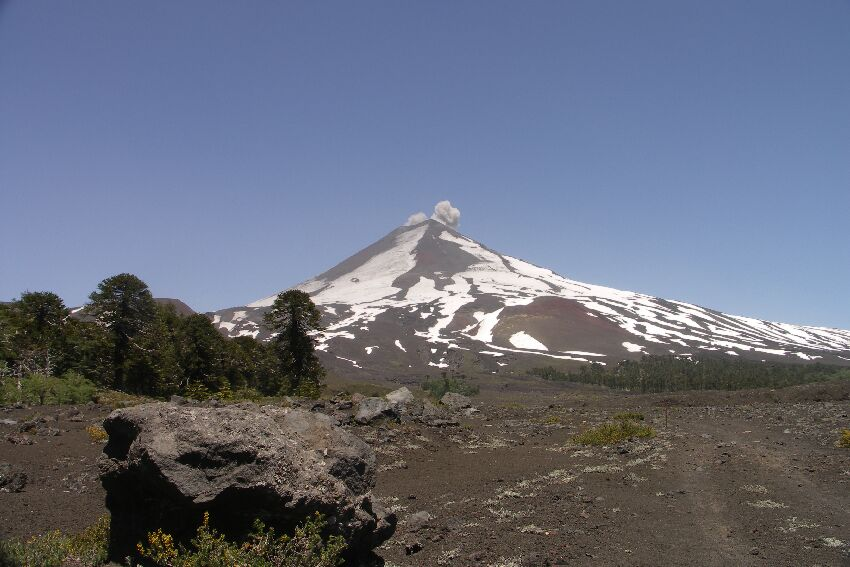
Llaima volcano

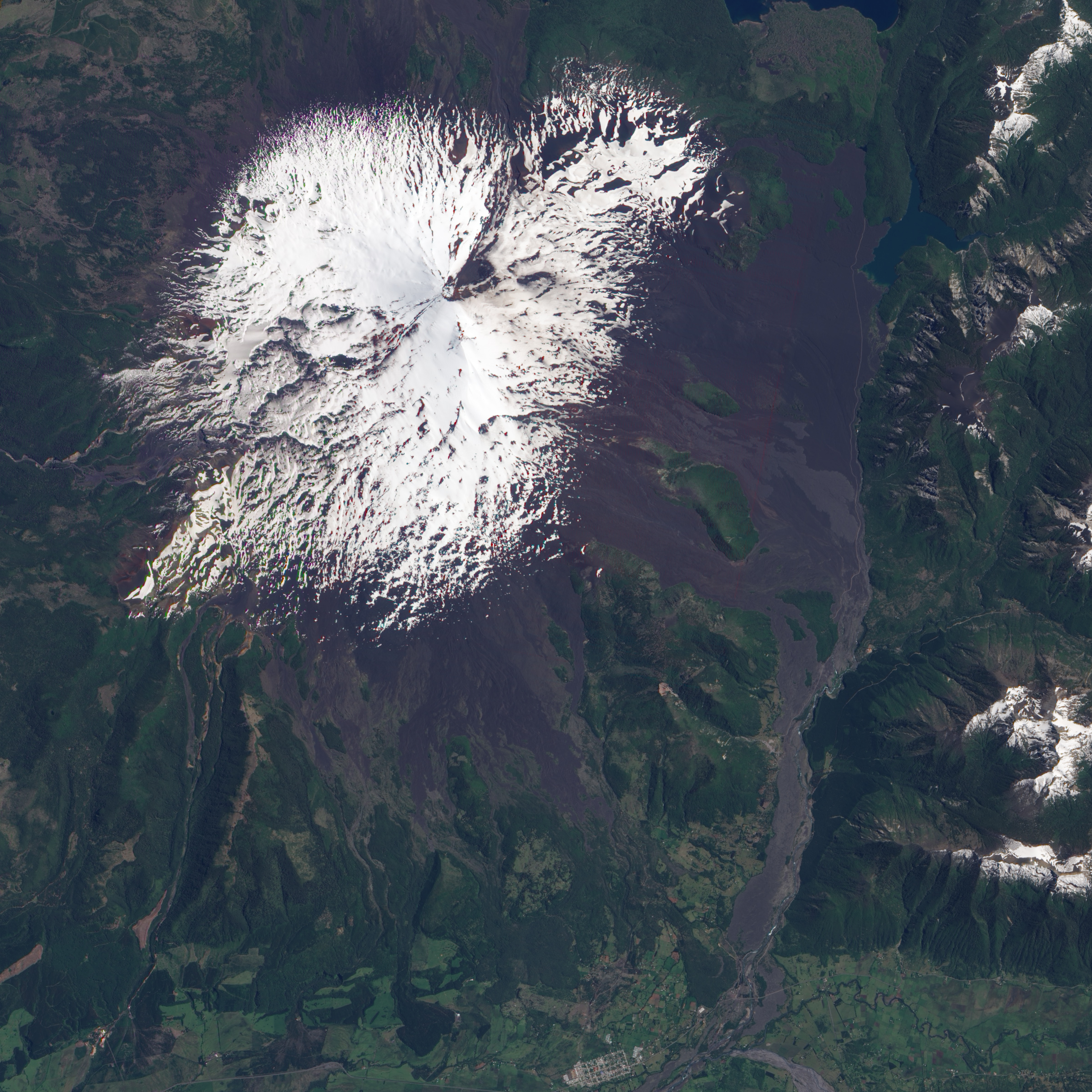
Snow-capped Llaima in springtime seen from space

== See also ==
- List of volcanoes in Chile
- List of Ultras of South America
- Kütralkura Geopark
