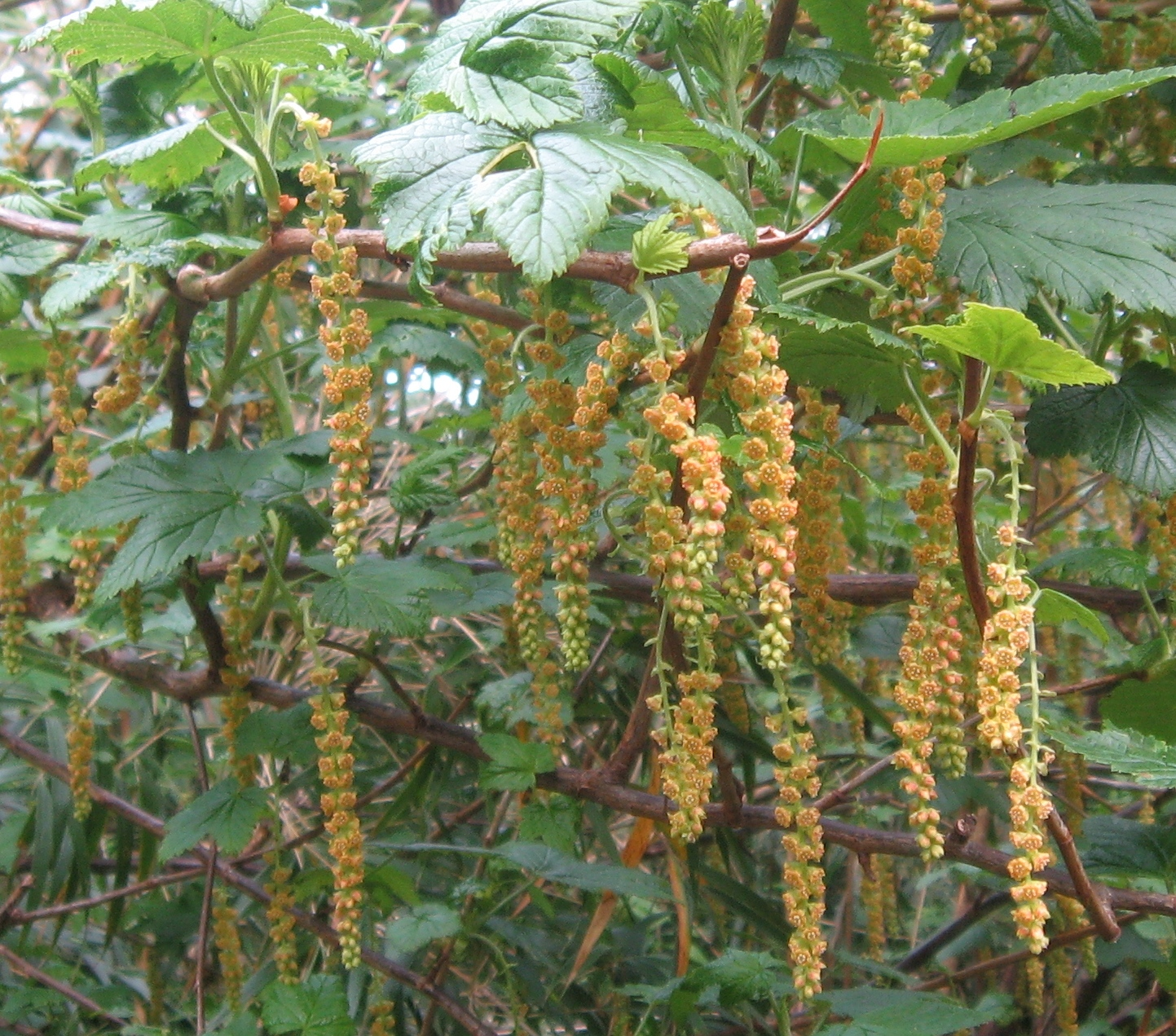
- Flowers
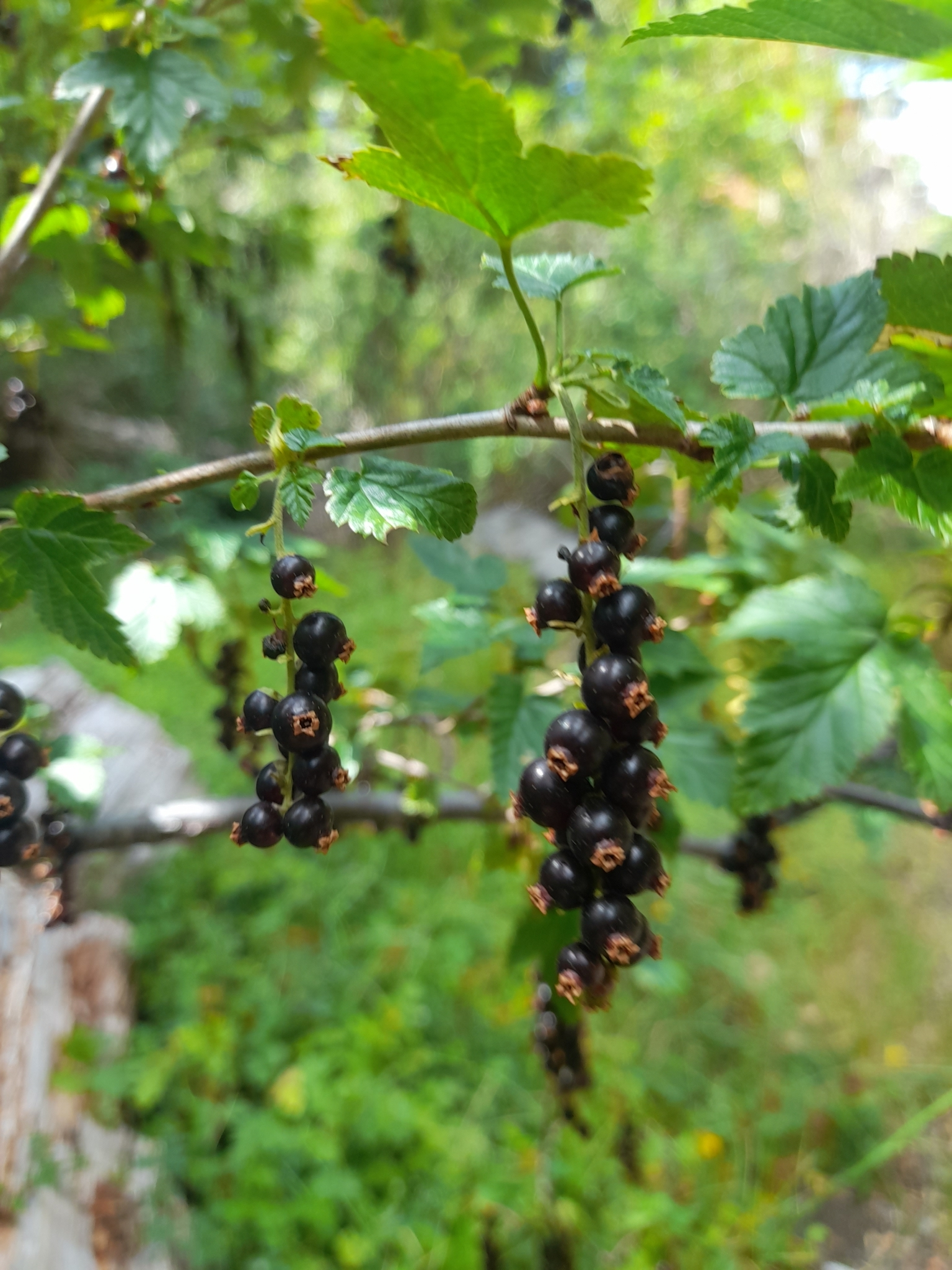
- Fruit

Scientific classification
- Kingdom: Plantae
- Clade: Embryophytes
- Clade: Tracheophytes
- Clade: Angiosperms
- Clade: Eudicots
- Order: Saxifragales
- Family: Grossulariaceae
- Genus: Ribes
- Species: R. magellanicum

Binomial name
- Ribes magellanicum Poir. 1812

Synonyms
- Ribes brachystachyum Phil.; Ribes micranthum Phil.; Ribes ovallei Phil.

= Ribes magellanicum =

Species of shrub

Ribes magellanicum is a South American species of shrubs in the currant family, native to Patagonia (southern Chile and Argentina). The fruits can be consumed fresh, in preserves and in syrups, have been described to have a pleasant flavor and sweet taste, and to harbour a phenolic compound profile and antioxidant activity with potential for nutraceutical development.

Two subspecies are accepted:

- Ribes magellanicum subsp. magellanicum
- Ribes magellanicum subsp. parviflorum Sparre
