= Melipeuco =

- Town and Commune
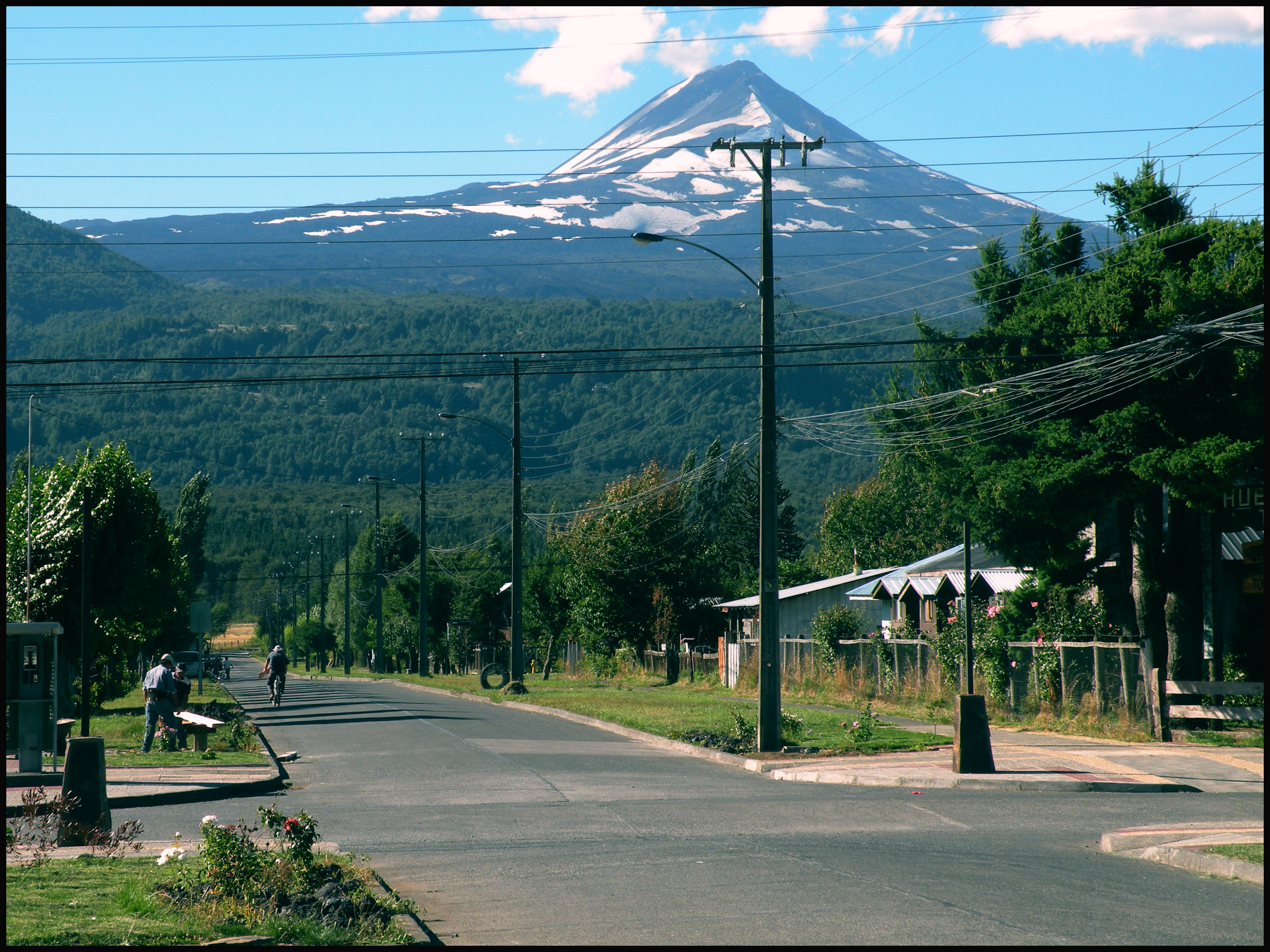
- Street in Melipeuco and Llaima Volcano in the background.

- Map of Melipeuco commune in the Araucania Region Location in Chile
- Coordinates (city): 38°51′S 71°42′W
- Country: Chile
- Region: Araucanía
- Province: Cautín

Government
  - Type: Municipality
  - Alcalde: Eduardo Navarrete Fuentes (UDI)

Area
  - Total: 1,107.3 km^{2} (427.5 sq mi)
- Elevation: 461 m (1,512 ft)

Population (2012 Census)
  - Total: 5,590
  - Density: 5.05/km^{2} (13.1/sq mi)
  - Urban: 2,333
  - Rural: 3,295

Sex
  - Men: 2,906
  - Women: 2,722
- Time zone: UTC-4 (CLT)
  - Summer (DST): UTC-3 (CLST)
- Area code: country 56 + city 45
- Website: www.melipeuco.cl

Melipeuco (Spanish pronunciation: [meliˈpewko]) is a town and commune (Spanish: comuna) in Chile, located at the foot of the Andes, in the Province of Cautín, Araucanía Region. Melipeuco is 12 km (7 mi) from the southern entrance of the Conguillío National Park. The Nevados de Sollipulli, an ice-filled volcanic caldera surrounded by numerous hot water springs and geysers, lie south of the town. Lake Carilafquén is also located in this area. At the edge of the Nevados de Sollipulli, at the Alpehue intersection 33 km (21 mi) away, there are several hot springs with water from 40 to 70 °C (104 to 158 °F), even in the middle of glacier blocks.

== Demographics ==
Historical population
Year	Pop.	±% p.a.
1970	6,837	—
1982	5,593	−1.66%
1992	5,313	−0.51%
2002	5,628	+0.58%
2017	6,138	+0.58%
2024	6,796	+1.47%
Source: "Censo de Población y Vivienda". National Statistics Institute.

According to the 2002 census of the National Statistics Institute, Melipeuco spans an area of 1,107.3 km^{2} (428 sq mi) and has 5,628 inhabitants (2,908 men and 2,720 women). Of these, 2,333 (41.5%) lived in urban areas and 3,295 (58.5%) in rural areas. The population grew by 5.9% (315 persons) between the 1992 and 2002 censuses.

== Administration ==
As a commune, Melipeuco is a third-level administrative division of Chile administered by a municipal council, headed by an alcalde who is directly elected every four years. The 2008-2012 alcalde is Eduardo Navarrete Fuentes (UDI).

Within the electoral divisions of Chile, Melipeuco is represented in the Chamber of Deputies by Enrique Estay (UDI) and Fuad Chahín (PDC) as part of the 49th electoral district, together with Victoria, Curacautín, Lonquimay, Vilcún, Lautaro, Perquenco and Galvarino. The commune is represented in the Senate by Alberto Espina Otero (RN) and Jaime Quintana Leal (PPD) as part of the 14th senatorial constituency (Araucanía-North).

== View ==
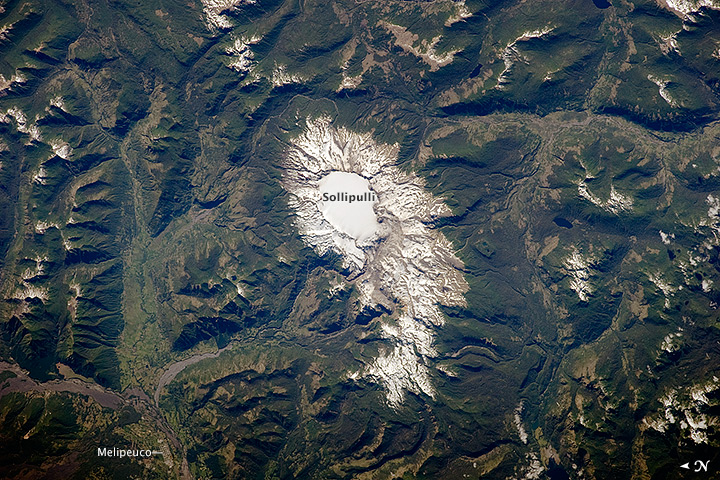
Sollipulli
