= Aillarehue =

Confederation

Aillarehue or Ayllarehue (from the Mapudungun: ayllarewe/ayjarewe: "nine rehues"); a confederation of rehues or family-based units (lof) that dominated a region or province. It was the old administrative and territorial division of the Mapuche, Huilliche and the extinct Picunche people. Aillarehue acted as a unit only on special festive, religious, political and especial military occasions. Several aillarehues formed the Butalmapu, the largest military and political organization of the Mapuche.

== Etymology ==
Each Mapuche lof, levo or caví (lineage) celebrated its religious rituals at a unique rehue or rewe ("altar"), near the home of a local lonko, Ulmen or cacique, often the word rehue was used with the sense of party or clan ("I am from this rehue"), in a way similar to the old form of Christian administrative allegiance to parishes. Although aillarehue ment "nine altars" these confederations did not necessarily conform to this number of rehues. The name of many of these aillarehue confederations have remained in the present toponymy of the southern regions of Chile.

== List of known Mapuche Butalmapu, their aillarehues and their known member rehues ==
=== Picunmapu ===
Although it is known the Picunche had many aillarehues in the central zone of Chile, like those of Codegua, Vichuquén and Rapel most of their names are unknown. The following list is reconstructed from the listing of the aillarehues of the Moluche and Huilliche between the Itata River and Reloncaví Sound, due to the work of Ricardo E. Latcham in the 1920s. Five Butalmapu were known to the Spanish at the beginning of the 18th century. Add to them the one in the region between the Itata and Bio Bio Rivers, that existed at the early part of the Conquest of Chile. With this one six are known to have existed. One is thought to have existed among the Picunche to the north of the Itata River, at the beginning of the conquest. It is thought to have extended from the Limari to the Mataquito Rivers. The Picunche of the region of the Maule River valley may have been a separate Butalmapu or an aillarehue allied with the Cauquenes aillarehue and aillarehue of the northern Moluche Butalmapu at the time of the Inca invasion of Chile and at the Battle of the Maule.

=== Butalmapu between the Itata and Bio Bio Rivers ===
The Butalmapu of Moluche aillarehues located between the coast and the foothills of the Andes between the Itata River and Bio Bio River.

- Coelemu (Spanish name Gualemo) between the Itata River and Estero Bureo.
  - Coelemu
  - Otohue
  - Coihueco
- Peguco (Spanish name Penco) between the Estero Bureo and Andalién Rivers.
  - Talcahuenu
  - Aquelpangue
  - Arana
  - Puchacay
  - Andalién
- Rere on both sides of the Claro River
  - Huelén-Huelén
  - Cahuiñungue
  - Guachumávida
  - Talcamávida
- Hualqui to the north of the Bio Bio River, from Quilacoya River to the Pacific Ocean and south of the Andalién River.
  - Laleufu
  - Quilacoya
  - Yecutun
  - Hualqui or Gualque
  - Talcahuenu
- Llancamilla (Spanish usually called it Llaucamilla) between the Itata River and the region near Los Ángeles, east of Rere.
  - Tolmilla
  - Quelenmapuco
- Rarinlevu between the Laja River and Bio Bio River east of Los Ángeles.
  - (names of rehues unknown)

=== Lafkenmapu ===
The Butalmapu of Moluche aillarehues located between the coast and the Nahuelbuta Range between the Bio Bio River and the Toltén River, (from north to south):

- Marihuenu between the Bio Bio and the Carampangue Rivers
  - Neculhuenu
  - Pailahuenu
  - Topillanca
  - Antuhuenu
  - Colcura
  - Marihuenu
  - Huenurehue
  - Chechelevo
  - Conilevo
  - Quiapeo
  - Cahuinhuenu
- Arauco between the Carampangue and the Lebu Rivers
  - Panguerehue
  - Millarupue
  - Llaghupai (Lavapie)
  - Quidico
  - Quiapo
  - Levo (Lebu)
  - Colico
  - Arauco
  - Andalicán
- Tucapel between the Lebu and the Lleulleu Rivers
  - Molhuilli
  - Lincoyan
  - Pilmaiquén
  - Tucapel
  - Paicavi
  - Ancalemu
  - Thomelemu
  - Cayucupil
  - Ilicura
  - Vutalevu
- Licanievu between the Lleulleu and the Tirua Rivers
  - Chamacodo
  - Lemolemo
  - Villoto
  - Colcuimo
  - Relomo
  - Pillurehue
  - Vilurehue
  - Provinco
  - Licanlebu
  - Tirua
- Ranquilhue between the Tirua and the Cautín Rivers
  - Ranquilhue
  - Quinahuel
  - Pellahuenu
  - Claroa
  - Rangaloe
  - Trevolhue
  - Moncolhue
- Cautín between the Cautín and the Toltén Rivers
  - Pelulcura
  - Llamocavi
  - Coyamrehue
  - Celolebu
  - Budi

=== Lelfünmapu ===
The Butalmapu of Moluche aillarehues located in the Chilean Central Valley and between the Bio Bio River and the Toltén River:

- Catiray east of the Nahuelbuta Range to the Bio Bio River until Negete in the south.
  - Pirenmavida
  - Tavolevo
  - Lincura
  - Arumco
  - Pilumrehue
  - Curalevo
  - Coyamco
  - Quilalemu
  - Gueche
  - Chipimo
  - Mayurehue
  - Peterehue
  - Namcurehue
  - Millapoa
- Chacaico between the Huequén River and the Renaico River
  - Chacaico
  - Viluquen
- Purén major parts of the old Department of Angol and of Traiguén from the Nahuelbuta Range to the Rahue River.
  - Guadava
  - Purén
  - Coyamcahuin
  - Lumaco
  - Tomelemu
  - Coipolevo
  - Picoiquen
  - Engolmo
  - Leborupu
  - Voquilemu
- Rupucura located in both shores of the Cholchol River, from entrance of the Colpi River, to the Cautín River, and from the Cautin, from hills of Nielol to the Nahuelbuta Range.
  - Nielol
  - Rupucura
  - Colpillan
  - Voigueco
- Boroa south of the Cautin River between the Boroa and Quepe Rivers
  - Boroa

=== Ina piremapu ===
The Butalmapu of Moluche aillarehues located in the zone of the foothills of the Andes between the Bio Bio River and the Toltén River:

- Malven the old Department of Mulchen to the hills of Pemehue.
  - Malven
  - Rucalhue
  - Quilaco
- Colhue between the rivers Renaico and Malleco.
  - Colhue
- Quecherehue between the Huequén and Traiguén Rivers.
  - Quecherehue
  - Adencul
  - Nupangue
  - Quillahueque
- Quillinco between the Traiguén and Cautin Rivers
  - Quillinco
- Maquehue between the Cautin and Quepe Rivers
  - Maquehue
  - Quincholco
  - Chumilemo
  - Puellocavi
  - Alihueco
  - Ailangue
  - Purumen

=== Piren mapu ===
The Butalmapu of Pehuenche aillarehues located in the zone of the Andes cordillera between the Itata and the Toltén Rivers:

- Quilcolco between the Duqueco and the Bio Bio Rivers
  - Mincoya
  - Coquilpoco
  - Otarachina
  - Iguamamilla
  - Iguandepirén
  - Inaculicán
  - Maricaiveo
  - Alcanhuere
  - Calvulicán
  - Millanaliuél
  - Chancanahuél
- Rucalhue, between the valley of the Bio Bio, in the vicinity of Santa Bárbara
  - Marupu
  - Memacoiputuongo
  - Tililco
  - Queuco
- Callaqui in the same valley in the vicinity of the Callaque volcano.
- Lolco from Callaque to Lonquimay.
- Liucura from Lonquimay to Gualletué.
- Huenchulafquén, the vicinity of lake Huenchulafquén.

=== Willimapu ===
The Butalmapu of Huilliche and Cuncos aillarehues located in between the Toltén River and the Bueno River:

- Maricünga or Mariquina located in plain on both banks of the Cruces River.
  - Marileufu
  - Chonqui
  - Rucaraque
- Chedque geographic location unknown
- Huenuhue or Guanehue vicinity of Panguipulli Lake.
- Pidhuinco geographic location unknown
- Arique, to the south of the Calle-Calle River to the Callileufu River.
- Naghtoltén south of the Toltén River, between the sea and the Donquill River.
- Quele to the south of Naghtoltén, from the coast, contiguous with the Maricüga River.
  - Coipolavquén
  - Huelchehue
- Huadalafquén from the north bank of the Calle-Calle River to the coast, bounded on the north by Maricüga.
  - Lucone
  - Popalán
  - Pocotí
  - Calle Calle
  - Piden
- Riñihue in the region of Riñihue Lake
- Quinchilca to the west of Riñihue and on both sides of the Quinchilca River.
- Collico, between the Calle Calle and Futa Rivers.
- Cudico, the region between the Futa River and the sea.
  - Sepilloa
  - Colleco
  - Lepilmapu
- Daghlipulli, to the east of Cudico.
- Quechurehue, between the Allipén River and Villarrica Lake.
- Ranco, in the region of Ranco Lake.

=== Chawra kawin ===
The Butalmapu of Huilliche and Cuncos aillarehues located between the Bueno River and the Reloncaví Sound:

- Coihueco south of Osorno, Chile.
- Cunco on the coast before Llanquihue Lake.
- Quilacahuín, between the Rahue River and the sea.
- Trumao to the north of Quilacahuín, on the South bank of the Bueno River.
- Lipihue, to the southwest of Llanquihue lake.
- Lepilmapu, between the Llico River and the Maullín River.
- Carelmapu, to the south of the Maullín River.
- Calbuco, to the east of Carelmapu.

== Sources ==
- Juan Ignatius Molina, The Geographical, Natural, and Civil History of Chili, Longman, Hurst, Rees, and Orme, London, 1809
- Ricardo E. Latcham, La organización social y las creencias religiosas de los antiguos araucanos, Santiago de Chile, Impr. Cervantes, 1924.
