= Repocura River =

River in Chile

The Repocura River of the La Araucanía Region of Chile has its source in the eastern slope of the Nahuelbuta Range northwest of the town of Cholchol and runs towards the southeast to join the Cholchol River on its western bank across from Cholchol. It is wide and of a depth that allows the navigation of small boats. The river crosses flat and fertile fields.

This valley of the Repocura River was the location of the densely populated Rupucura rehue and was the location of the principal placer gold mines of the old city of La Imperial before the Mapuche Uprising of 1598. Rupucura also was the name of one of the aillarehue of the Lafkenmapu Butalmapu. Rupucura was located on both shores of the Cholchol River, from entrance of the Colpi River, to the Cautín River, and from the Cautin, from hills of Nielol to the Nahuelbuta Range. By the bank of the Repocura river Fort de la Encarnación was built in 1666 by the Royal Governor of Chile Francisco de Meneses Brito. A fort and a mission with the title of Repocura or Repucura were founded in December 1694, replacing to the Fort de la Encarnación destroyed during a Mapuche rising earlier that year. These were also ruined in the Mapuche Insurrection of 1723 and were again restored in 1764 but the Mapuche again destroyed them completely two years later in the Mapuche Rebellion of 1766.

Its Mapudungun name according to Diego de Rosales meant rock road, from the words rypu "way" and cura, "stone".

== Sources ==
- Francisco Solano Asta Buruaga y Cienfuegos, Diccionario geográfico de la República de Chile, SEGUNDA EDICIÓN CORREGIDA Y AUMENTADA, NUEVA YORK, D. APPLETON Y COMPAÑÍA. 1899. pg. 665 Repocura.— Rio
