= Pilmaiquén =

Watercourse tributary of Río Licauquén, in Arauco, Chile

Pilmaiquén or Pilmayquen (Mapudungun) is a riachuelo in the commune of Cañete in Arauco Province in the Bío Bío Region of Chile that flows southwest towards the coast of the Pacific Ocean to the northwest of the city of Cañete. Its course is short but of great volume and traverses a small valley between wooded mountainous areas where it joins the Licauquén River. This valley was a Moluche rehue of the Tucapel aillarehue and the homeland of the Toqui Caupolicán who commanded the Mapuche in the first revolt against domination by the Spanish Empire.

== Sources ==
- Francisco Solano Asta-Buruaga y Cienfuegos, Diccionario geográfico de la República de Chile, SEGUNDA EDICIÓN CORREGIDA Y AUMENTADA, NUEVA YORK, D. APPLETON Y COMPAÑÍA. 1899. p. 556
- Ricardo E. Latcham, La organización social y las creencias religiosas de los antiguos araucanos, Santiago de Chile, Impr. Cervantes, 1924.
