= Boroa =

Coordinates: 38°45′S 72°50′W

Boroa was a town in Araucanía, Chile on the shores of Cautín River. The region near the town south of the Cautin River between the Boroa and Quepe Rivers was the Moluche aillarehue of Boroa. The site of the town was founded as a Spanish fort San Ignacio de la Redención in 1606 by maestre de campo Rodulfo Lisperger during the Arauco War but it did not remain long after he and his garrison were ambushed. Later in 1649 as a result of the Parliament of Quillín (1647), Martín de Mujica y Buitrón was able to reestablish the fort at Boroa but it was abandoned in 1656 after a long siege during the Mapuche uprising of 1655. One could still find vestiges of the old Spanish fort near the mission at its location at the end of the 19th century.

== See also ==
- La Frontera

== Sources ==
- Diego de Rosales, “Historia General del Reino de Chile”, Flandes Indiano, 3 tomos. Valparaíso 1877 - 1878.
- Francisco Solano Asta Buruaga y Cienfuegos Diccionario geográfico de la República de Chile, SEGUNDA EDICIÓN CORREGIDA Y AUMENTADA, NUEVA YORK, D. APPLETON Y COMPAÑÍA. 1899. Pg.889 Voroa
