= Talcamávida =

Coordinates: 37.160°S 72.910°W

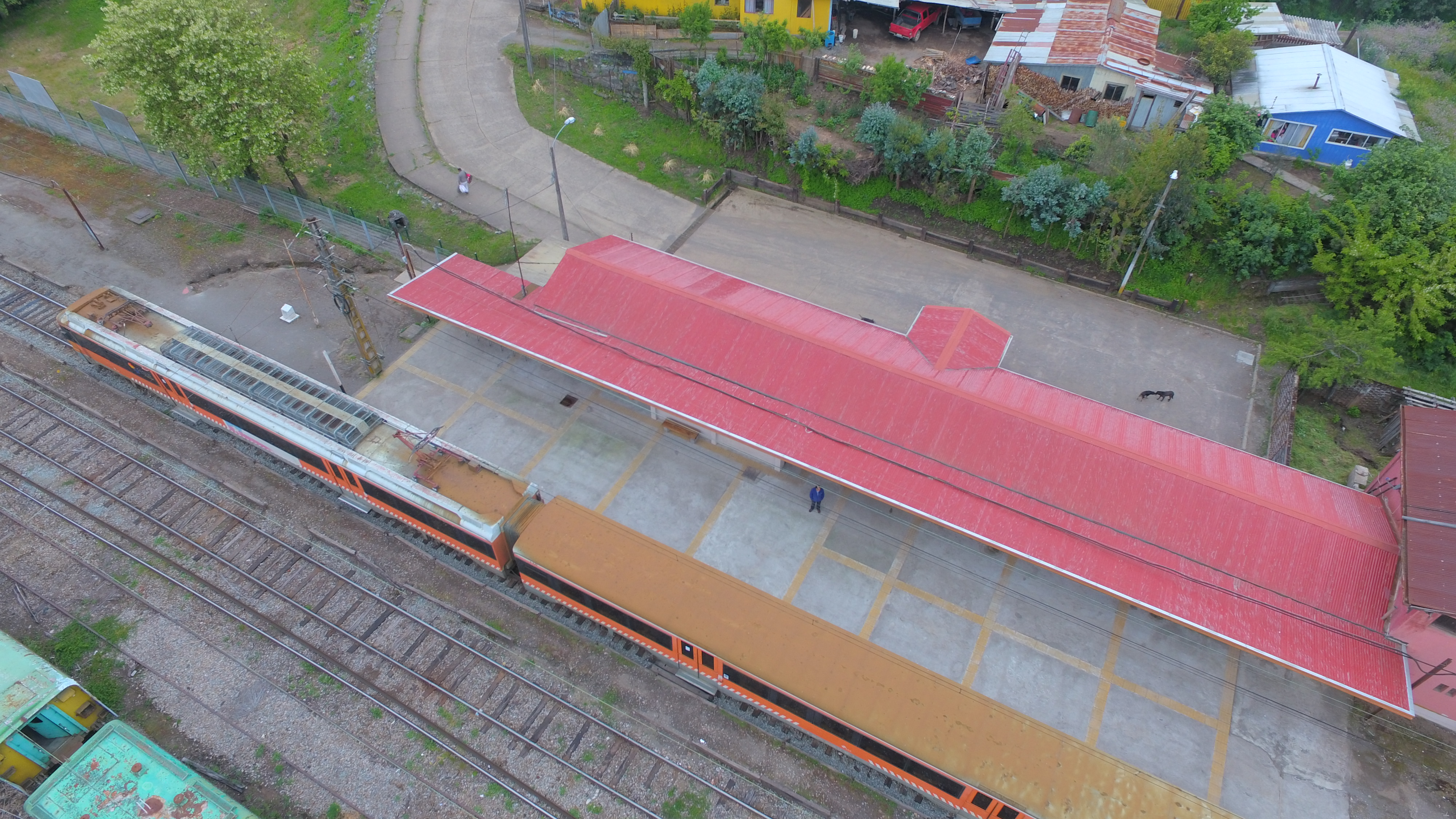
Talcamávida train station, Corto Laja service

Talcamávida is a town in the commune of Hualqui in the Biobío Region of Chile. It is located on the north bank of the Bio Bio River across from Santa Juana on the opposite shore. It occupied a plain along the river 42 kilometres (26 mi) from the Pacific Ocean that is part of a small valley surrounded by to the north by a high wooded mountainous area. It is 40 kilometres (25 mi) from Yumbel, to the east northeast, 24 kilometres (15 mi) from Hualqui and 47 kilometres (29 mi) from Concepción to the north.

To the north of Talcamávida was the Quilacoya River and riachuelo of Millahue, in whose valleys and mountains Pedro de Valdivia forced the people of the Moluche rehue of Quilacoya to work in the rich gold mines there. His successor García Hurtado de Mendoza was the first that established a small fort there in 1560. It was destroyed more than once by the neighboring natives, and was rebuilt under the government of Pedro Porter Casanate. It was not settled until the time of the governor Manuel de Amat y Junyent, who rebuilt the fort again and populated it as the town of San Rafael de Talcamávida, in 1756. In 1821 it was burned by the same royalist force that set fire to Santa Juana. In 1872 it became a rail station on the line between Concepcion and San Rosendo.

== History ==
Its origin dates back long before the arrival of the Spaniards, as it was a settlement of the Indians called "Antileo", who settled on the banks of the Biobío River. The finding of perforated stones and ceramic remains testify to this.

Also in the 15th century it was the site of the second invasion that Chile has received in its history, by the Incas led by Huayna Capac. The victory and bellicosity of the Mapuches would prevent them from advancing and settling there in the following years, having to return to the Maule River, finally delimiting it as a border line. However, this did not prevent contact between the two peoples, and the temporary exploitation of the gold mines of Quilacoya.

== See also ==
- List of towns in Chile
