= Quilacoya River =

River in Chile

Quilacoya River is located in the Hualqui commune of Concepcion Province of Chile. It has course of about 40 kilometers with a small volume. It originates in the southern slopes of the series of heights of Lucay that run from east to west in the southern part of the commune of Florida. It runs to the southwest to join the Bío Bío River on the North bank nine kilometers above the town of Hualqui.

The Quillacoya River was the location of the Moluche rehue of Quillacoya within the Hualqui aillarehue. In the upper part of the river it is joined by the riachuelo Millahue and other small streams in which rich placer gold mines were discovered in 1552 by Governor Pedro de Valdivia. The governor formed a mine there in October 1553 with great number of Mapuche workers, who abandoned it immediately after his death at the end of that year. The working of these mines began again later, but soon afterward they were exhausted. The name Quilacoya derives from the Mapudungun for three coyán, formed from quyla, "three", and from coyán, the Moluche name for the Nothofagus obliqua.

== Sources ==
- Francisco Solano Asta Buruaga y Cienfuegos, Diccionario geográfico de la República de Chile, SEGUNDA EDICIÓN CORREGIDA Y AUMENTADA, NUEVA YORK, D. APPLETON Y COMPAÑÍA. 1899. pg.616 Quilacoya. — Rio
- Resumen Ejecutivo: Diagnóstico y Evaluación par a manejo Integr ado de Cuencas Agraria Sur – INIA Quilamapu; pj.6-7 Microcuenca QUILACOYA
