= Cautín =

Cautín may refer to:

- Cautín Province, a province in the Araucanía Region of southern Chile
- Cautín River, a river in Chile that flows in Cautín Province
