= Quilacahuín =

Quilacahuín was a Huilliche aillarehue, that is a confederation of familial clans, of the Chawra kawin Butalmapu located south of the Bueno River, between the Rahue River and the sea, in southern Chile.

== Sources ==
- Juan Ignatius Molina, The Geographical, Natural, and Civil History of Chili, Longman, Hurst, Rees, and Orme, London, 1809
- Ricardo E. Latcham, La organización social y las creencias religiosas de los antiguos araucanos, Santiago de Chile, Impr. Cervantes, 1924.
