= Fort de la Encarnación =

Fort de la Encarnación on the Repocura River was built in 1666 by a team overseen by Juan Ignacio de la Carrera and the orders of the Royal Governor of Chile Francisco de Meneses Brito. It was destroyed during a Mapuche rising in 1694 and rebuilt by Tomás Marín de Poveda with a nearby mission in December of the same year. These were destroyed in the 1723 Mapuche rising. Rebuilt again as Fort Repucura by Governor Antonio de Guill y Gonzaga in 1764, it was destroyed for the last time in the Mapuche uprising of 1766.

== Sources ==
- Francisco Solano Asta Buruaga y Cienfuegos, Diccionario geográfico de la República de Chile, SEGUNDA EDICIÓN CORREGIDA Y AUMENTADA, NUEVA YORK, D. APPLETON Y COMPAÑÍA. 1899. pg. 265 Encarnación.— Antigua plaza fuerte
