= Ulmen (Mapuche) =

Ulmen is a Mapudungun word meaning "rich man". In Mapuche society, the wealthy men were usually the loncos and would often be the influential leaders of their rehue and aillarehue. If skilled in war, like the military leader Caupolicán, they were sometimes elected toqui.

== Sources ==
Juan Ignacio Molina (1809). The Geographical, Natural, and Civil History of Chili Volume 2. London: Longman, Hurst, Rees, and Orme.
