= San Ignacio de la Redención =

San Ignacio de la Redención was a fort established in 1606 by Alonso García de Ramón, Royal Governor of Chile, in a plain, located in the region of Boroa on the north bank of the Cautín River. In forty days he constructed a large fort, surrounded by a wide ditch, defended by a solid and thick wood palisade, and provided with extensive buildings to hold a large garrison. He intended the following year to turn it into a city. However, the garrison, under its commander Maestro de Campo Rodulfo Lisperger, and most of his garrison were ambushed and annihilated that same year and the fort was abandoned.

== See also ==
- La Frontera, Chile

== Sources ==
- Francisco Solano Asta Buruaga y Cienfuegos Diccionario geográfico de la República de Chile, SEGUNDA EDICIÓN CORREGIDA Y AUMENTADA, NUEVA YORK, D. APPLETON Y COMPAÑÍA. 1899. Pg.889 Voroa
- Diego Barros Arana, Historia general de Chile. Tomo tercero
  - Capítulo XXI, pg. 348
