= Liolaemus mapuche =

Conservation status
- Least Concern (IUCN 3.1)

Scientific classification
- Kingdom: Animalia
- Phylum: Chordata
- Class: Reptilia
- Order: Squamata
- Suborder: Iguania
- Family: Liolaemidae
- Genus: Liolaemus
- Species: L. mapuche

Binomial name
- Liolaemus mapuche Abdala, 2002

Species of lizard

Liolaemus mapuche is a species of lizard in the family Liolaemidae. The species is endemic to Argentina.

== Etymology ==
The specific name, mapuche, is in honor of the Mapuche people, an aboriginal tribe of Patagonia.

== Geographic range ==
Liolaemus mapuche is found in the Argentinian provinces of Neuquén and Río Negro.

== Habitat ==
The preferred natural habitat of Liolaemus mapuche is grassland and shrubland, at altitudes of 500–650 m (1,640–2,130 ft).

== Diet ==
Liolaemus mapuche preys upon ants.

== Reproduction ==
Liolaemus mapuche is oviparous.

== Taxonomy ==
Liolaemus mapuche is a member of the Liolaemus boulengeri species group.
