= Licauquén River =

River in Biobio Region, Chile

Licauquén River a short river or riachuelo south of Lebu and west of Cañete. It comes from the eastern wooded heights of the Arauco Province to the coast of the Pacific Ocean, it is joined in its upper reaches by a tributary riachuelo named Pilmaiquén and it runs a few kilometers to the southwest to end on the coast at 37° 50' Lat. South, nearby Punta Molguilla (Point Molguilla).

== Sources ==
- Francisco Solano Asta-Buruaga y Cienfuegos, Diccionario geográfico de la República de Chile, SEGUNDA EDICIÓN CORREGIDA Y AUMENTADA, NUEVA YORK, D. APPLETON Y COMPAÑÍA. 1899. p. 367
