= Quepe River =

Coordinates: 38.7811°S 72.9264°W

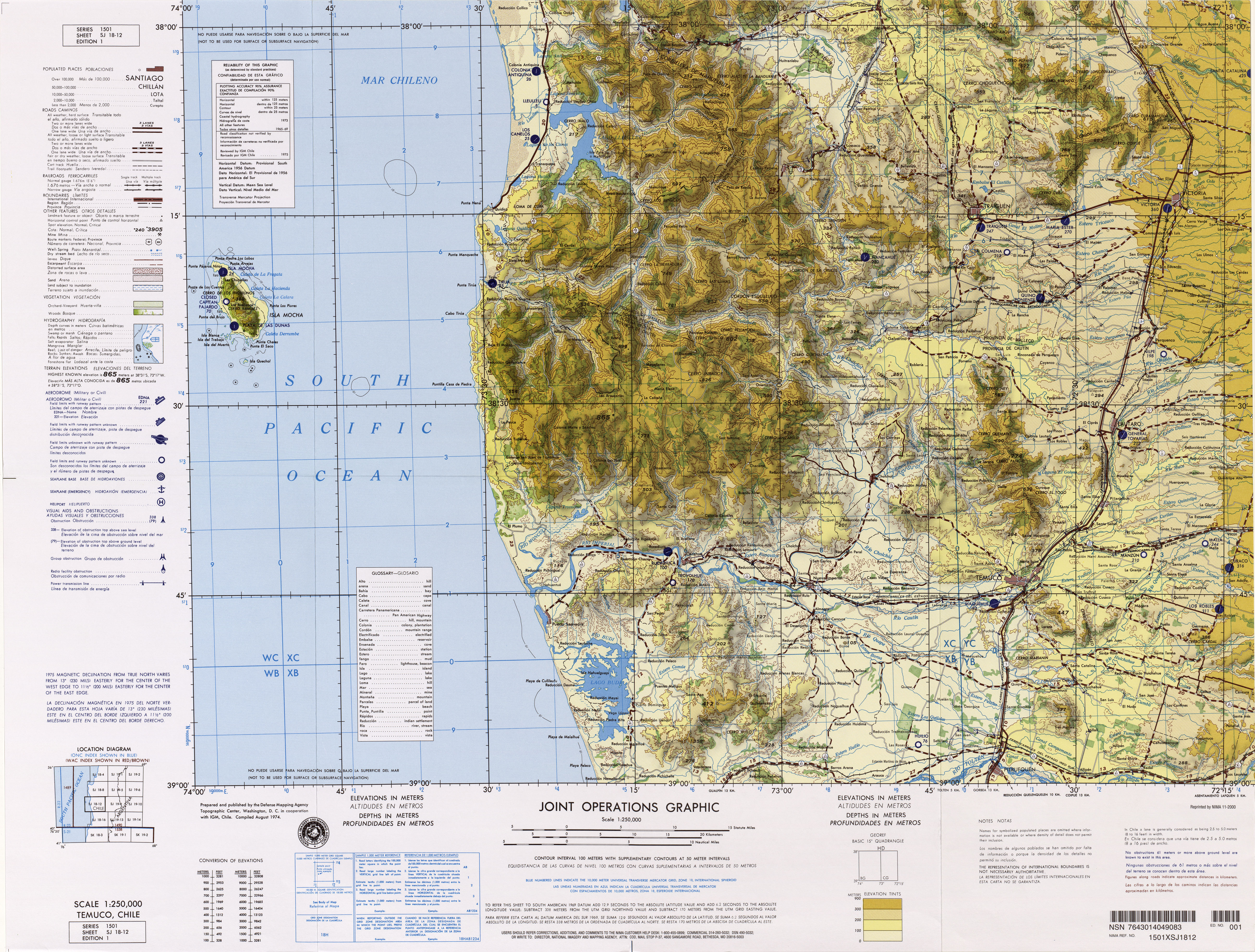
- Quepe River, few kilometers South of Temuco

Location
- Country: Chile

Physical characteristics
- Source
  - location: Laguna Quepe
- Length: 112 km (70 mi)

Quepe River is a river of Chile located in the La Araucanía Region. It originates in the lake of the same name, in the vicinity of Llaima volcano. Then flows about 112 km to join the Cautín River near the locality of Almagro, only a few kilometres upstream of the confluence of the rivers Cautín and Chol Chol, point of origin of the Imperial River.
