= Butalmapu =

Butalmapu or Fütalmapu is the name in Mapudungun for "great land", which were one of the great confederations wherein the Mapuche people organized themselves in case of war. These confederations corresponded to the great geographic areas inhabited by the Mapuches in Chile.

At the beginning of the conquest of Chile it is thought that there was a Butalmapu among the Picunche from the Limari River south to the vicinity of the Mataquito River that was headed by a Michimalonco. Also at the beginning of the conquest of Chile, a Moluche Butalmapu, (name unknown), existed south of the Itata River and north of the Bio Bio River. It may have included the aillurehue of the Cauquenes north of the Itata, who occasionally fought with them against the Spanish in the sixteenth century and earlier against the Inca in the Battle of the Maule.

Among the Moluche south of the Bio Bio River there were by the seventeenth century, three Butalmapu, that conformed with the main territorial identities of the Moluche: Lafkenmapu, the coastal region, Lelfünmapu the plains of the Intermediate Depression and Inapiremapu the foothills of the Andes. One other Piremapu in the Andes mountain range, was inhabited by the Pehuenches.

Each butalmapu was made up of several smaller confederations; aillarehues, that were made up of a number of familial clans of the same region, known as lofs. In case of an external danger or the beginning of a military campaign, the loncos (caciques) of all the lofs chose a supreme military leader of the Butalmapu, called the Toqui and Gran Toqui by the Spaniards. This leader had the right to make military decisions and usually only left his position when the campaign finished or he died. Butalmapus were not described as such in Spanish chronicles until the Cautiverio feliz y razón individual de las guerras dilatadas del reino de Chile, of Francisco Núñez de Pineda y Bascuñán, where an account of these confederations first occurred. They were called by Núñez “utanmapu”.

Among the Huilliche and Cuncos to the south of the Moluche there were two Butalmapu: Willimapu located in between the Toltén River and the Bueno River and the Chawra kawin located between the Bueno River and the Reloncaví Sound. By 1805 these were consolidated into just one, Huillimapu.

== Sources ==
- Ricardo E. Latcham, La organización social y las creencias religiosas de los antiguos araucanos, Impr. Cervantes, Santiago de Chile, 1924.
- INFORME DE LA COMISIÓN VERDAD HISTÓRICA Y NUEVO TRATO 2003; Volumen III, TOMO II, Primera parte del informe final de la Comision de Trabajo Autónomo Mapuche, Capitulo II Territorio y Tierras Mapuche, II. Procesos territoriales en el mapunche majontu mapu (1550-1818)
