= Duqueco River =

River in Chile

Duqueco River, Río Duqueco, is a river of the Biobío Region of Chile.
