= Lonko =

Tribal chief of the Mapuche people

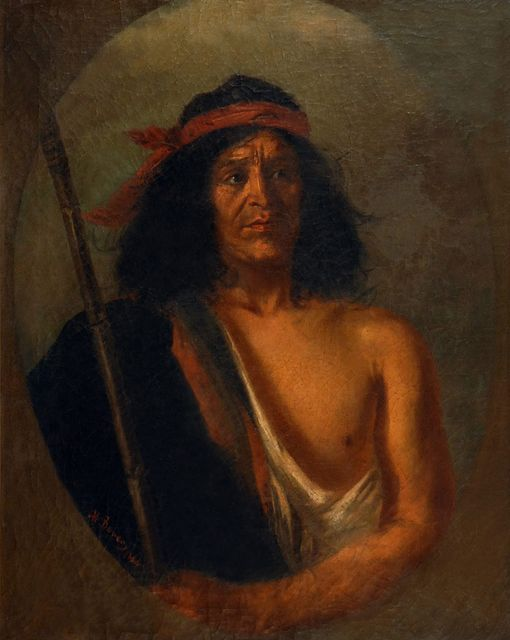
Portrait of the lonco Quilapán.

A lonko or lonco (from Mapudungun longko, literally "head"), is a chief of several Mapuche communities. These were often ulmen, the wealthier men in the lof. In wartime, lonkos of the various local rehue or the larger aillarehue would gather in a koyag or parliament and would elect a toqui to lead the warriors in battle. Lonco sometimes forms part of geographical names such as the city of Loncoche (English: "head of an important person").
