= Huequén River =

- Location of mouth in Chile
- Native name: Río Huequén (Spanish)

Location
- Country: Chile
- Region: Araucanía
- Province: Malleco

Physical characteristics
- Mouth
  - location: 36.8176°S 73.1624°W
- Length: 17.43 km (10.83 mi)

The Huequén River (Spanish: Río Huequén) is located in the Malleco Province of the Araucanía Region in Chile. It is a tributary of the Vergara River. The city of Angol sits at the confluence of the Huequén River and the Malleco river. Rio Requén and Rio Ñipaco are tributaries of the Huequén River. The river undergoes seasonal flooding in the winter.

The river has a total length of 17.43 kilometres (10.83 mi).
