= Llico River =

River in Llanquihue Province, Chile

Llico
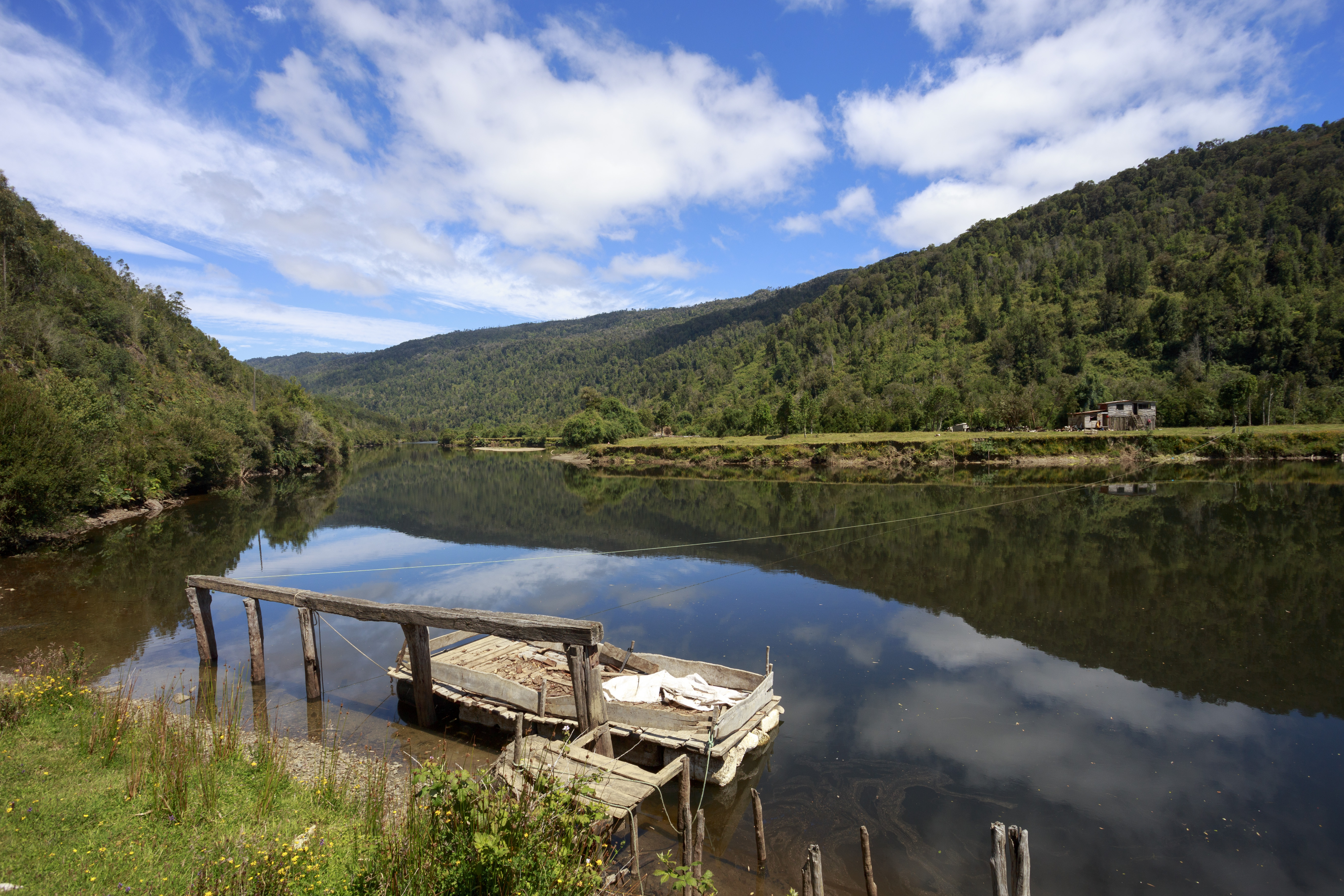
- View of Llico River near its outflow in the Pacific Ocean
- Native name: Río Llico (Spanish)

Location
- Country: Chile

Physical characteristics
- Source
  - location: Coastal Precordillera
- Mouth
  - location: Chile, Pacific Ocean
  - coordinates: 41°17′26″S 73°50′36″W
  - elevation: 0 m (0 ft)

Llico River is one of the principal rivers of Llanquihue Province in southern Chile. It runs from northeast to southwest draining part of the eastern slopes of Cordillera del Sarao, which is part of Chilean Coast Range. The local equivalent of the Mindel and Elsterian glaciations is named Río Llico glaciation.

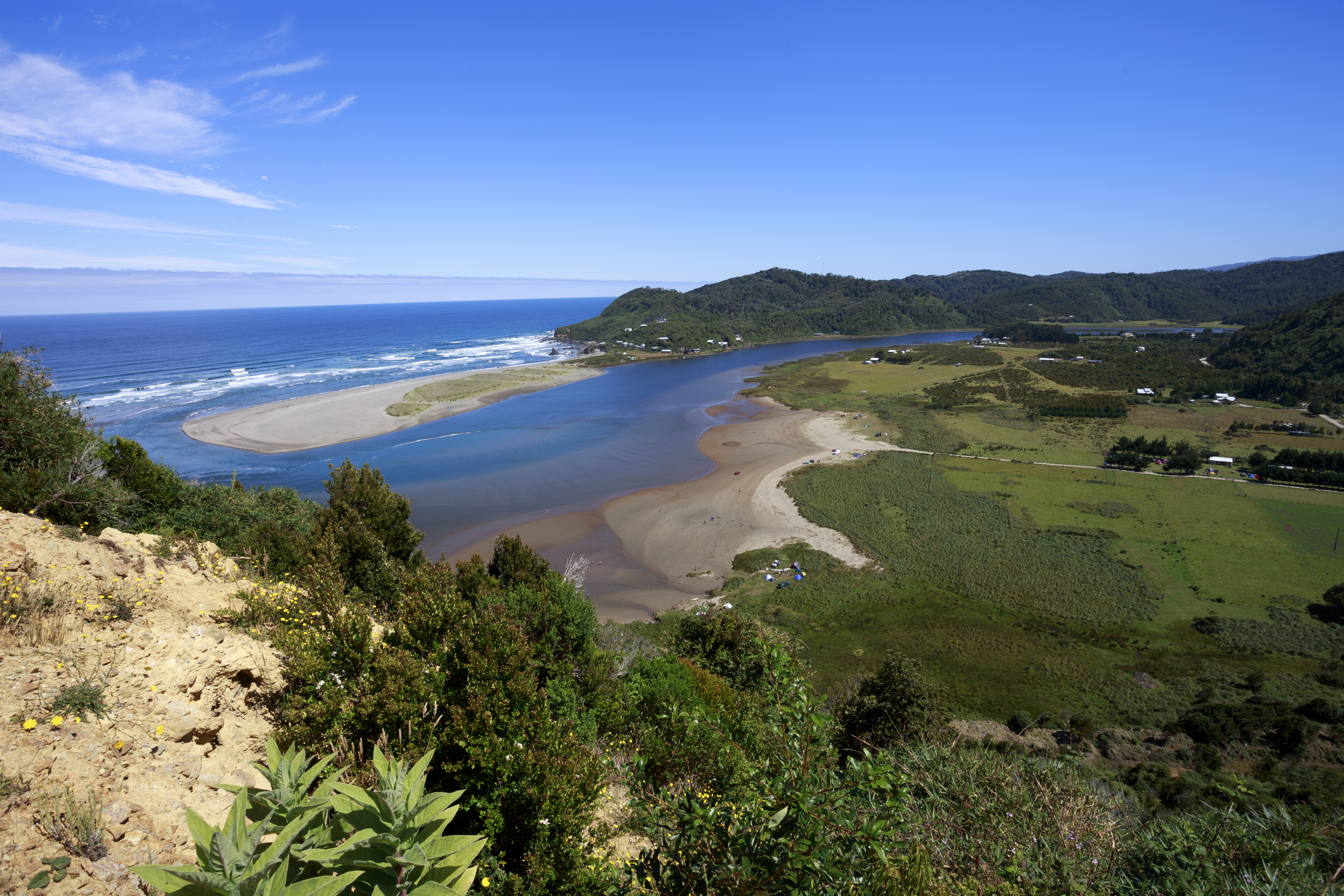
Outflow of Llico River to the Pacific Ocean

== See also ==
- List of rivers of Chile
