= Lleulleu River =

River in Chile

Coordinates: 38°7′1.2″S 73°27′0″W

Lleulleu River (Spanish: Río Lleulleu) is a river in the Biobío Region of Chile. The source of the 6.3-kilometre (3.9 mi) river is Lleulleu Lake, and the mouth is the Pacific Ocean.
