= Lof =

Basic social organization of the Mapuche people

Lof (Spanish: levo and lov) or caví (Spanish: cahuín); formed the basic social organization of the Mapuche, Mapuche-Huilliche and the extinct Picunche peoples, consisting of a familial clan or lineage that recognizes the authority of a lonco (cacique). The lof or caví is formed by diverse families that share the same territory and who are considered mutually related, descended from a common ancestor. Several lof form a rehue, and nine rehue formed the aillarehue. These formed one of the 3 or 5 great territorial confederations of the Mapuches, the Butalmapu ("great earth").

The identity of lof was reinforced by the accomplishment of diverse community and festive activities. Lof habitually shared a unique rehue, or Machi's altar, in which the more significant religious ceremonies were performed. The vitality of the clan shone in the accomplishment of Lof kudau, a type of retributive communitarian work, followed by a celebration with a feast and drinking, similar to the mingaco of the Quechua. Lof kudau consisted usually of harvests, and other work that demanded large amounts of manpower, mainly in the fields of rich and prestigious personages of the lof: the ulmenes and loncos, who could afford to provide enough food and drink to those who worked.

== Sources ==
- Juan Ignatius Molina, The Geographical, Natural, and Civil History of Chili, London: Longman, Hurst, Rees, and Orme, 1809
- El Pueblo Mapuche; Los Mapuche en la Historia y el Presente
