= Imperial River (Chile) =

Coordinates: 38°47′S 73°24′W

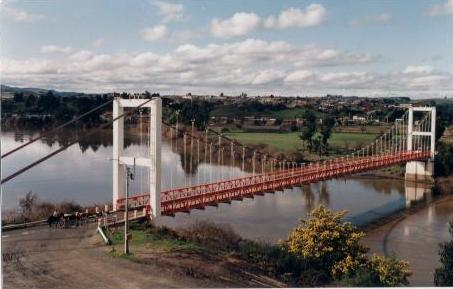
- Carahue Suspension Bridge

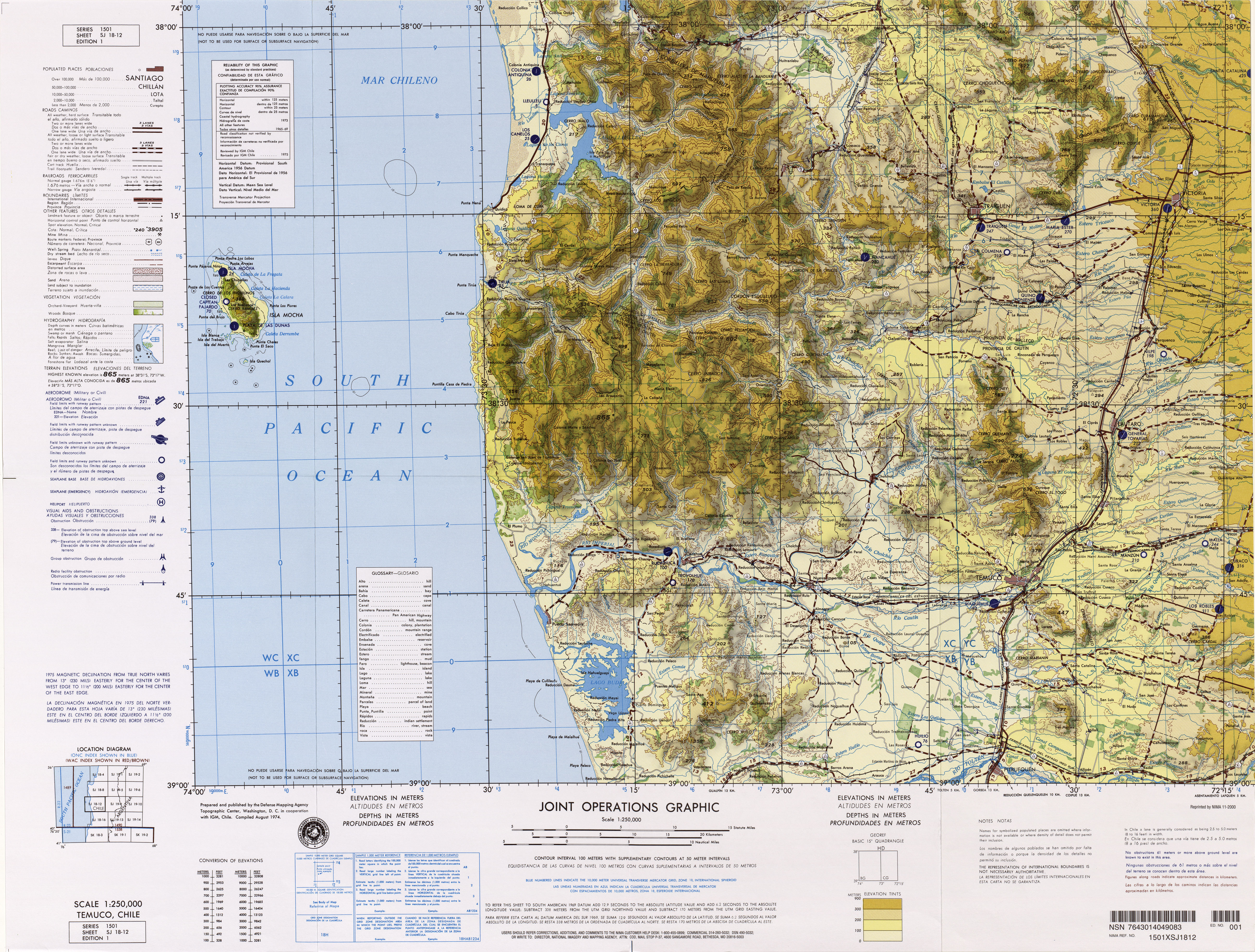
- Map of the Region of Temuco

Location
- Country: Chile

Physical characteristics
- Mouth
  - location: Pacific Ocean
- Length: 55 km (34 mi)
- Basin size: 12.763 km^{2} (4.928 sq mi)
- Discharge
  - average: 240 m^{3}/s (8,500 cu ft/s)

Imperial River is a river located in the La Araucanía Region of Chile. It is formed at the confluence of the Chol Chol and Cautín Rivers in the vicinity of the city of Nueva Imperial.

The towns of Carahue and Puerto Saavedra sit along the banks of the Imperial river. Near its mouth is located the outlet of Budi Lake.

The river borders the Cordillera de Nahuelbuta.
