= Araucanía (historic region) =

Indigenously-inhabited area of Chile

(Arauco) "chalky water"
- People: Moluche/Nguluche
- Language: Mapudungun
- Country: Araucanía

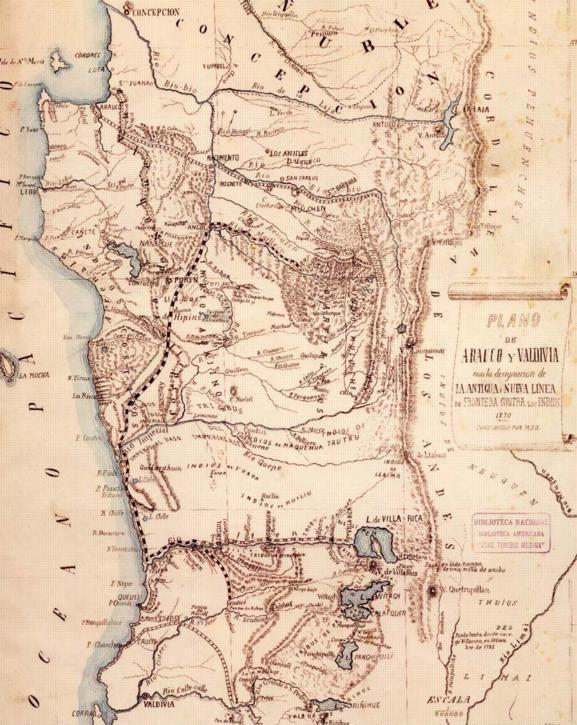
Map showing the "old" and the "new" frontiers of Mapuche Araucanía established by 1870 through the occupation of Araucanía.

Araucanía or Araucana was the Spanish name given to the region of Chile inhabited by the Mapuche peoples known as the Moluche (also known as Araucanos by the Spanish) in the 18th century. Prior to the Spanish conquest of Chile, the lands of the Moluche lay between the Itata River and Toltén River.

== History ==
Following the great rising of the Moluche and Huilliche after the Battle of Curalaba in 1598 during the Arauco War, they expelled the Spanish from south of the Bío-Bío River. After many decades of further warfare, the bounds of Araucania were recognized by the Spanish as being between the Bío-Bío and Toltén rivers. This old region of Araucanía now is divided between the southern part of the Bío-Bío Region and the Araucanía Region in southern Chile.

In the second half of the 19th century, the Chilean government pursued expansion into Araucanía lands, fighting wars against the indigenous. Peace settlements were negotiated in 1882 and 1883.

== See also ==
- La Araucana
- Kingdom of Araucania and Patagonia
- Futahuillimapu
- La Frontera region of Chile
- Wallmapu
