= Cholchol River =

Coordinates: 38.7522°S 72.9783°W

Chol Chol River
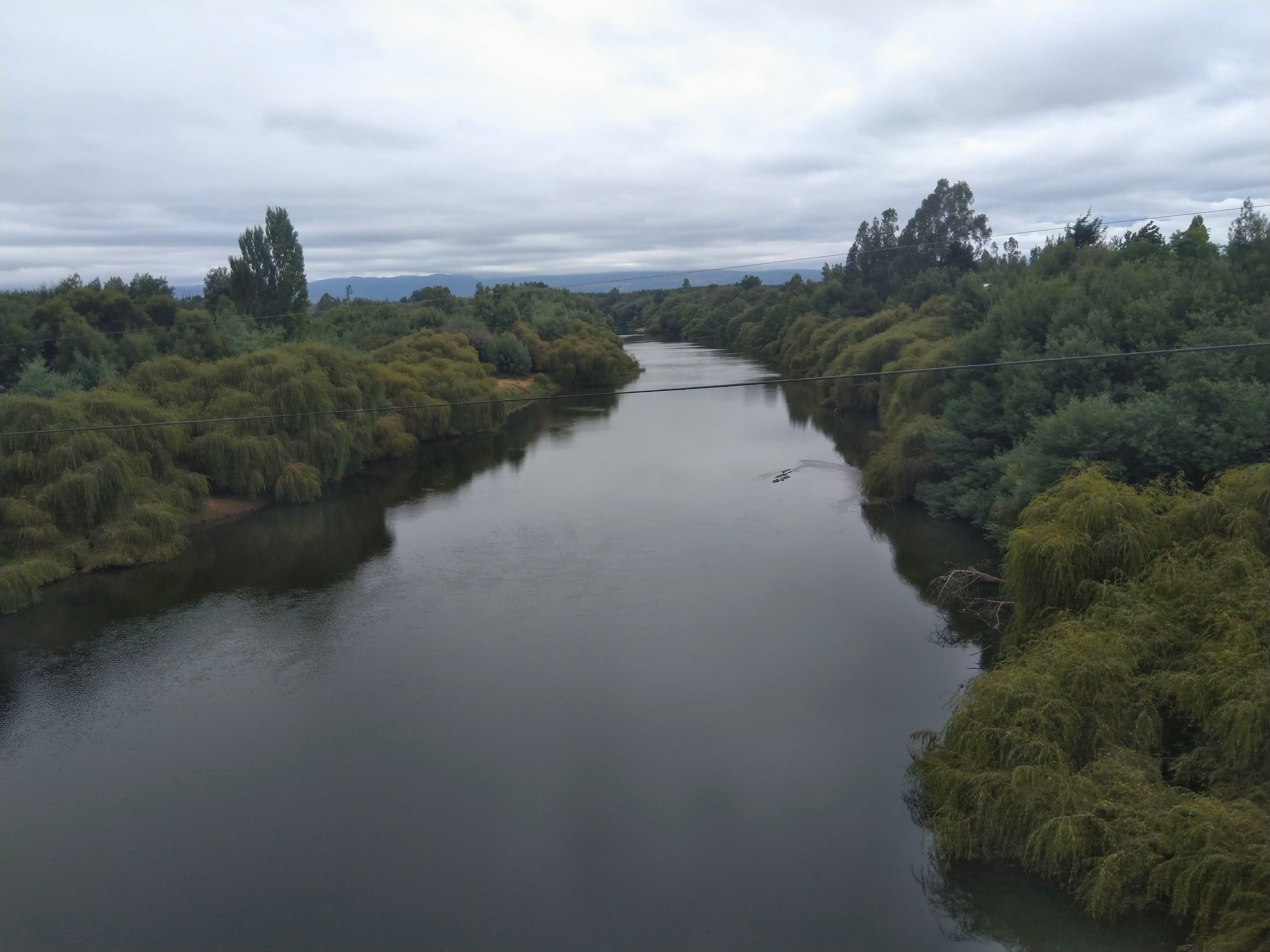

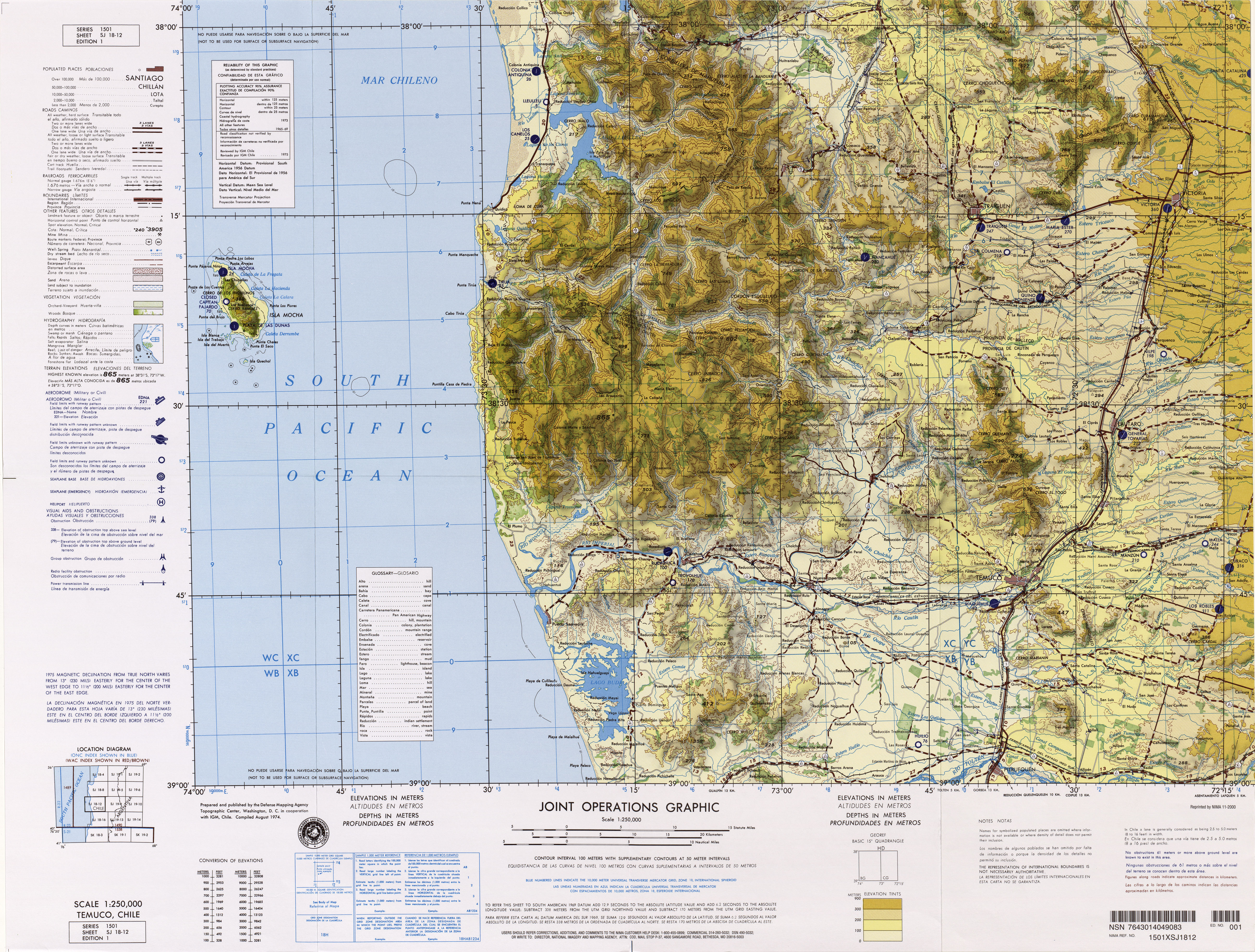
- Map of the Region of Temuco

Location
- Country: Chile

The Chol Chol River is a river in Chile. It is situated in the Araucania Region of Chile in the village of Cholchol, just outside Temuco and with the Cautín River are tributaries of the Imperial River (Chile).

The river is a popular destination during the Chilean summer time of January and February when many families from nearby villages travel and camp by the river in order to use it for swimming.

== See also ==
- List of rivers of Chile
