= Mapuche =

Indigenous people of South America

- Traditional flag of the Mapuche

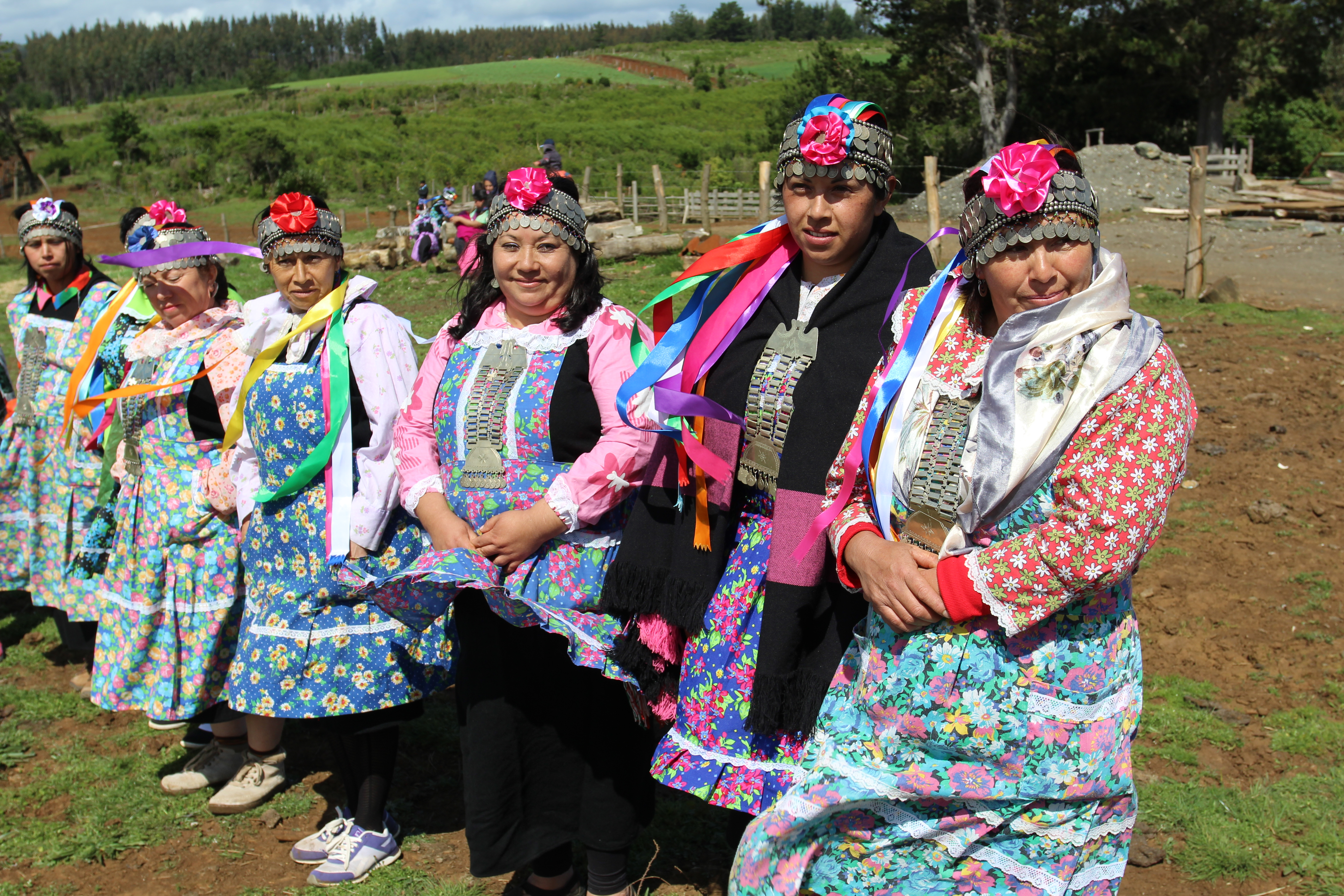
- Mapuche women from Tirúa in 2015

Total population
- c. 1,768,856

Regions with significant populations
- Chile: 1,623,073 (2024)
- Argentina: 145,783 (2022) (Pehuenche)

Languages
- Mapudungun; Spanish

Religion
- Traditional, Catholicism, Evangelicalism, Jehovah's Witnesses

Related ethnic groups
- Core groups: Boroano, Cunco, Huilliche, Lafquenche, Moluche, Picunche, Promaucae; Araucanized groups: Pehuenche, Puelche, Ranquel, Tehuelche

mapu
- People: Mapuche
- Language: Mapudungun

The Mapuche (/məˈpuːtʃi/ mə-POO-chee, Mapuche and Spanish: [maˈputʃe]), also known as Araucanians, are a group of Indigenous inhabitants of south-central Chile and southwestern Argentina, including parts of Patagonia. The collective term refers to a wide-ranging ethnicity composed of various groups who share a common social, religious, and economic structure, as well as a common linguistic heritage as Mapudungun speakers. Their homelands once extended from Choapa Valley to the Chiloé Archipelago and later spread eastward to Puelmapu, a land comprising part of the Argentine pampa and Patagonia. Today, the Mapuche represent 77.16% of Chile’s indigenous peoples and about 8.8% of the total national population. The Mapuche are concentrated in the Araucanía region. Many have migrated from rural areas to the cities of Santiago and Buenos Aires to pursue economic opportunities. Around 92% of the Mapuches are from Chile.

The Mapuche traditional economy is based on agriculture; their traditional social organization consists of extended families, under the direction of a lonko or chief. In times of war, the Mapuche would unite in larger groupings and elect a toki (meaning "axe" or "axe-bearer") to lead them. Mapuche material culture is known for its textiles and silverwork.

At the time of Spanish arrival, the Picunche inhabited the valleys between the Choapa and Itata, Araucanian Mapuche inhabited the valleys farther south between the Itata and Toltén rivers, and the Huilliche and the Cunco lived as far south as the Chiloé Archipelago. During the seventeenth, eighteenth, and nineteenth centuries, Mapuche groups migrated eastward into the Andes and Pampas, conquering, fusing with, and establishing relationships with the Poya and Pehuenche. At about the same time, ethnic groups of the Pampa regions, the Puelche, Ranquel, and northern Aonikenk, made contact with Mapuche groups. The Tehuelche adopted the Mapuche language and some of their culture, in what came to be called Araucanization. During this time, Patagonia came under effective Mapuche suzerainty.

During the colonial period, some Mapuche, especially the Picunche, mingled with the Spanish and formed a mestizo population that lost its Indigenous identity. But Mapuche society in Araucanía and Patagonia remained independent until the late nineteenth century, when Chile occupied Araucanía and Argentina conquered Puelmapu. The Mapuche then became subjects, and later nationals and citizens, of those states. Today, many Mapuche communities are engaged in the so-called Mapuche conflict over land and Indigenous rights in both Argentina and Chile.

== Etymology ==
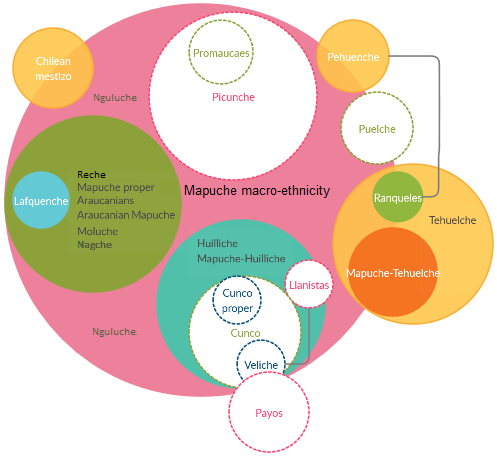
Euler diagram of Mapuche ethnicities. Historical denominations no longer in use are shown with white fields. Groups that adopted Mapuche language and culture or that have partial Mapuche descent are shown in the periphery of the main magenta-colored field.

Historically, the Spanish colonizers of South America referred to the Mapuche people as Araucanians (/ˌærɔːˈkeɪniənz/ ARR-aw-KAY-nee-ənz; Spanish: araucanos). This term is now considered pejorative by some people. For others, the importance of the term Araucanian lies in the universality of the epic work La Araucana, written by Alonso de Ercilla, and the feats of that people in their long and interminable war against the Spanish Empire. The name is probably derived from the place name rag ko (Spanish Arauco), meaning "chalky/clayish water". Although some have speculated a link with the Quechua word awqa, meaning "rebel" or "enemy", this is probably not the case.

Scholars believe that the various Mapuche groups (Moluche, Williche, Pikunche, etc.) called themselves Reche during the early Spanish colonial period, due to what they referred to as their pure native blood, derived from re meaning "pure" and che meaning "people".

The name Mapuche is used both to refer collectively to the Pikunche, Williche, and Moluche or Nguluche from Araucanía, at other times, exclusively to the Moluche or Nguluche from Araucanía. However, Mapuche is a relatively recent endonym meaning "People of the Earth" or "Children of the Land", with mapu meaning "earth" or "land", and che meaning "person". It is preferred as a term when referring to the people after the Arauco War.

The Mapuche identify by the geography of their territories, such as:

- Pwelche (also Hispanicized as Puelche): "people of the east" occupied Pwel mapu or Puel mapu, the eastern lands (Pampa and Patagonia of Argentina).
- Pikunche (also Hispanicized as Picunche): "people of the north" occupied Pikun-mapu, the "northern lands".
- Williche (also Hispanicized as Huilliche): "people of the south" occupied Willi mapu, the "southern lands".
- Pewenche (also Hispanicized as Pehuenche): "people of the pewen (Araucaria araucana)" occupied Pewen mapu, "the land of the pewen".
- Lafkenche: "people of the sea" occupied Lafken mapu, "the land of the sea"; also known as Coastal Mapuche.
- Nagche: "people of the plains" occupied Nag mapu, "the land of the plains" (located in sectors of the Cordillera de Nahuelbuta and the low zones bordering it). Its epic and literary name is Araucanians and its old autochthonous name is Reche. The ancient Mapuche Toqui ("axe-bearer") like Lef-Traru ("swift hawk", better known as Lautaro), Kallfülikan ("blue quartz stone", better known as Caupolicán – "polished flint") or Pelontraru ("Shining Caracara", better known as Pelantaro) were Nagche.
- Wenteche: "people of the valleys" occupied Wente mapu, "the land of the valleys".

== History ==
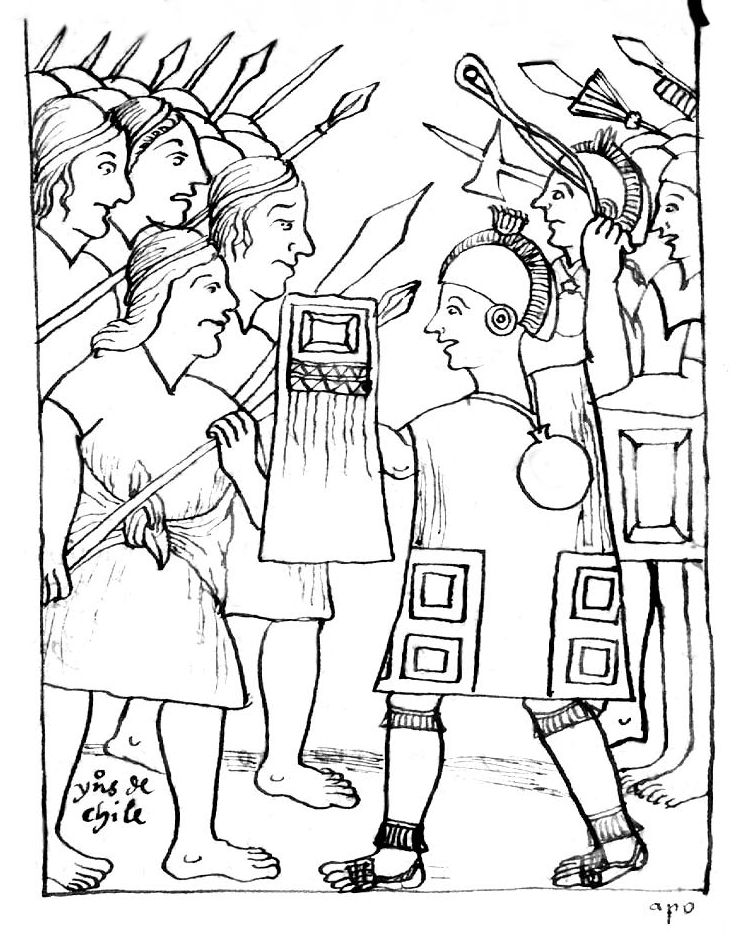
Felipe Guaman Poma de Ayala's drawing of the confrontation between the Mapuches (left) and the Incas (right)

=== Pre-Columbian period ===
Archaeological finds have shown that Mapuche culture existed in Chile and Argentina as early as 600 to 500 BC. Genetically the Mapuche differ from the adjacent Indigenous peoples of Patagonia. This suggests a "different origin or long-lasting separation of Mapuche and Patagonian populations".

Troops of the Inca Empire are reported to have reached the Maule River and had a battle with the Mapuche between the Maule and the Itata Rivers there. The southern border of the Inca Empire is believed by most modern scholars to have been situated between Santiago and the Maipo River, or somewhere between Santiago and the Maule River. Thus, the bulk of the Mapuche escaped Inca rule. Through their contact with Incan invaders Mapuches would have for the first time met people with state organizations. Their contact with the Incas gave them a collective awareness distinguishing between them and the invaders and uniting them into loose geo-political units despite their lack of state organization.

At the time of the arrival of the first Spaniards to Chile, the largest Indigenous population concentration was in the area spanning from the Itata River to Chiloé Island – that is the Mapuche heartland. The Mapuche population between Itata River and Reloncaví Sound has been estimated at 705,000–900,000 in the mid-sixteenth century by historian José Bengoa. (Note: Note that Chiloé Archipelago with its large population is not included in this estimate.)

Distribution of Indigenous people of Chile

=== Arauco War ===
The Spanish expansion into Mapuche territory was an offshoot of the conquest of Peru. In 1536, Diego de Almagro set out to conquer Chile, after crossing the Itata River they were intercepted by a numerous contingent of Araucanian Mapuche armed with many bows and pikes in the Battle of Reynogüelén. Discouraged by the ferocity of the Mapuches, and the apparent lack of gold and silver in these lands, Almagro decided upon a full retreat the following year to Peru. In 1541, Pedro de Valdivia reached Chile from Cuzco and founded Santiago. The northern Mapuche tribes, known as Picunches had recently gained independence from Inca rule, being commanded by Michimalonco, who had defeated the Inca governor Quilicanta. It would be the same Michimalonco who would lead the Picunche resistance against the Spanish between 1541 and 1545. His most famous achievement is the Destruction of Santiago.

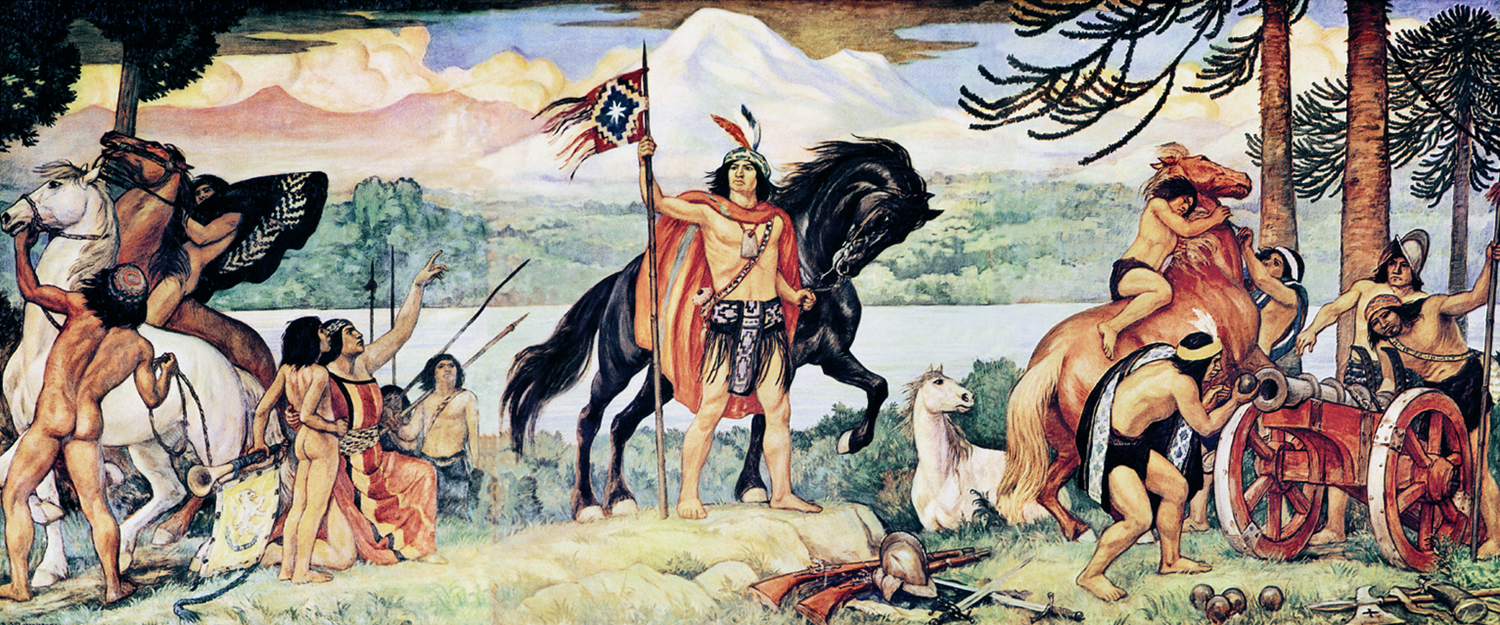
Painting El joven Lautaro of Pedro Subercaseaux

In 1550, Pedro de Valdivia, who aimed to control all of Chile to the Straits of Magellan, campaigned in south-central Chile to conquer more Mapuche controlled territory. Between 1550 and 1553, the Spanish founded several cities (Note: These "cities" were often no more than forts.) in Mapuche lands including Concepción, Valdivia, Imperial, Villarrica, and Angol. The Spanish also established the forts of Arauco, Purén, and Tucapel. Further efforts by the Spanish to gain more territory engaged them in the Arauco War against the Mapuche, a sporadic conflict that lasted nearly 350 years. Hostility towards the conquerors was compounded by the lack of a tradition of forced labor akin to the Inca mit'a among the Mapuche, who largely refused to serve the Spanish.

From their establishment in 1550 to 1598, the Mapuche frequently laid siege to Spanish settlements in Araucanía. In 1553, the Mapuches held a council at which they resolved to make war. They chose as their "toqui" (wartime chief) a strong man called Caupolicán and as his vice toqui Lautaro, because he had served as an auxiliary to the Spanish cavalry; he created the first Mapuche cavalry corps. With six thousand warriors under his command, Lautaro attacked the fort at Tucapel. The Spanish garrison was unable to withstand the assault and retreated to Purén. Lautaro seized and burned the fort and prepared his army certain that the Spaniards would attempt to retake Tucapel. Valdivia mounted a counter-attack, but he was quickly surrounded. He and his army was massacred by the Mapuches in the Battle of Tucapel. In 1554 Lautaro went to destroy Concepción where in the Battle of Marihueñu he defeated Governor Villagra and devastated the city. In 1555 Lautaro went to the city of Angol and destroyed it, he also returned to Concepción, rebuilt by the Spanish and destroyed it again. In 1557 Lautaro headed with his army to destroy Santiago, fighting numerous battles with the Spanish along the way, but he and his army were devastated in the Battle of Mataquito.

From 1558 to 1598, war was mostly a low-intensity conflict. Mapuche numbers decreased significantly following contact with the Spanish conquerors and settlers; wars and epidemics decimated the population. Others died in Spanish-owned gold mines.

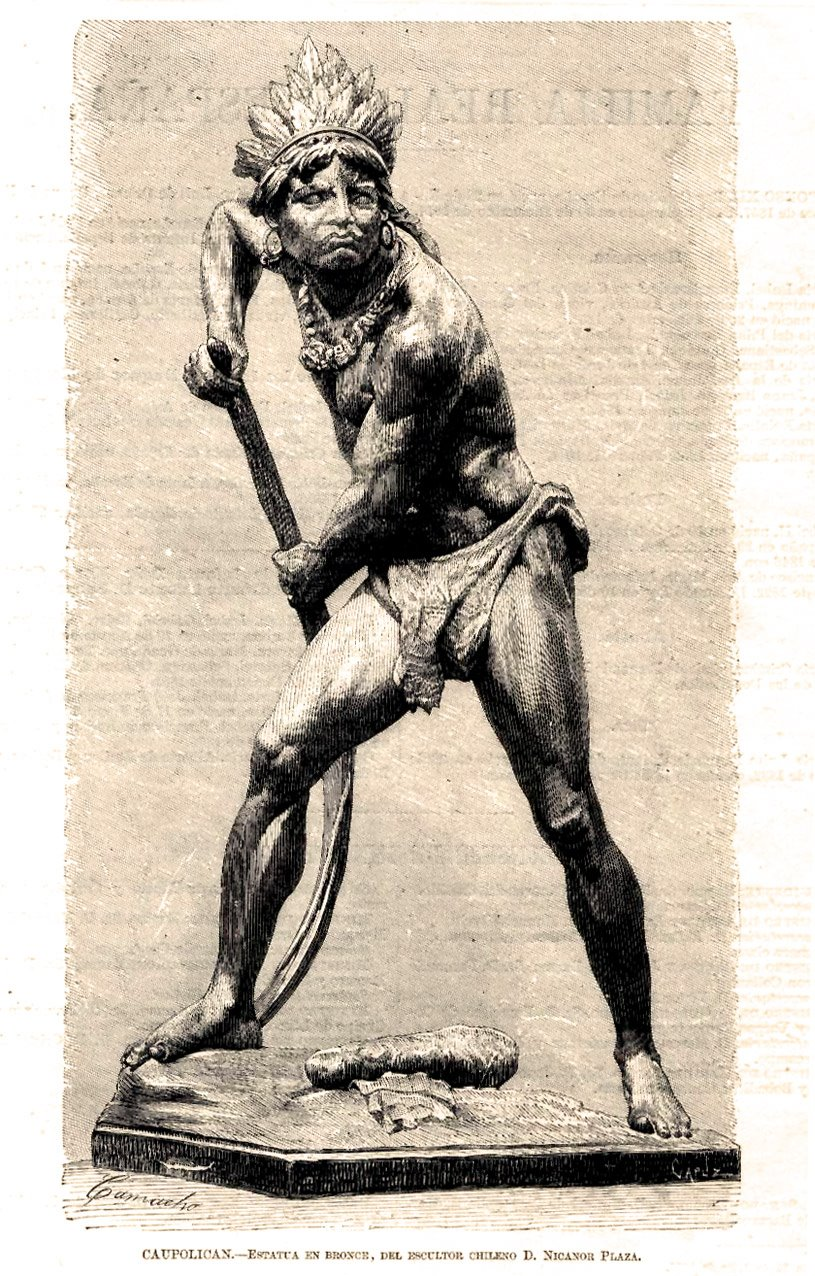
Caupolican by Nicanor Plaza

In 1598 a party of warriors from Purén led by Pelantaro, who were returning south from a raid in the Chillán area, ambushed Governor Martín García Óñez de Loyola and his troops in the Battle of Curalaba while they rested without taking any precautions against attack. Almost all the Spaniards died, save a cleric named Bartolomé Pérez, who was taken prisoner, and a soldier named Bernardo de Pereda. Led by Pelantaro the Mapuche then initiated a general uprising that destroyed all the cities in their homeland south of the Biobío River.

In the years following the Battle of Curalaba, a general uprising developed among the Mapuches and Huilliches led to the Destruction of the Seven Cities. The Spanish cities of Angol, Imperial, Osorno, Santa Cruz de Oñez, Valdivia, and Villarrica were either destroyed or abandoned. The city of Castro was taken by a Dutch-Mapuche alliance in 1599, but reconquered by the Spanish in 1600. Only Chillán and Concepción resisted Mapuche sieges and raids. Except for the Chiloé Archipelago, all Chilean territory south of the Bíobío River was freed from Spanish rule. Despite continued Spanish attempts to reconquer the territories south of the Biobio River, the border remained stable during the centuries in which the Spanish reigned in South America. In this period the Mapuche Nation crossed the Andes to conquer the present Argentine provinces of Chubut, Neuquen, La Pampa, Buenos Aires and Río Negro. Historians disagree over the time period during which the expansion took place, but estimate it occurred roughly between 1550 and 1850.

=== Boroano people ===
The Boroano, Boroga, or Borogano (also spelled with v) were a group of Mapuche native to the Aillarehue of Boroa in Araucanía. They were involved in several conflicts in the northern Patagonian pampas, and supported figures such as José Miguel Carrera, the Pincheira brothers, and Juan Manuel Rosas. The military power and influence of the Boroano ended with the massacre carried out by the lonco Calfucurá in 1834 during a trade meeting.

=== Incorporation into Chile and Argentina ===
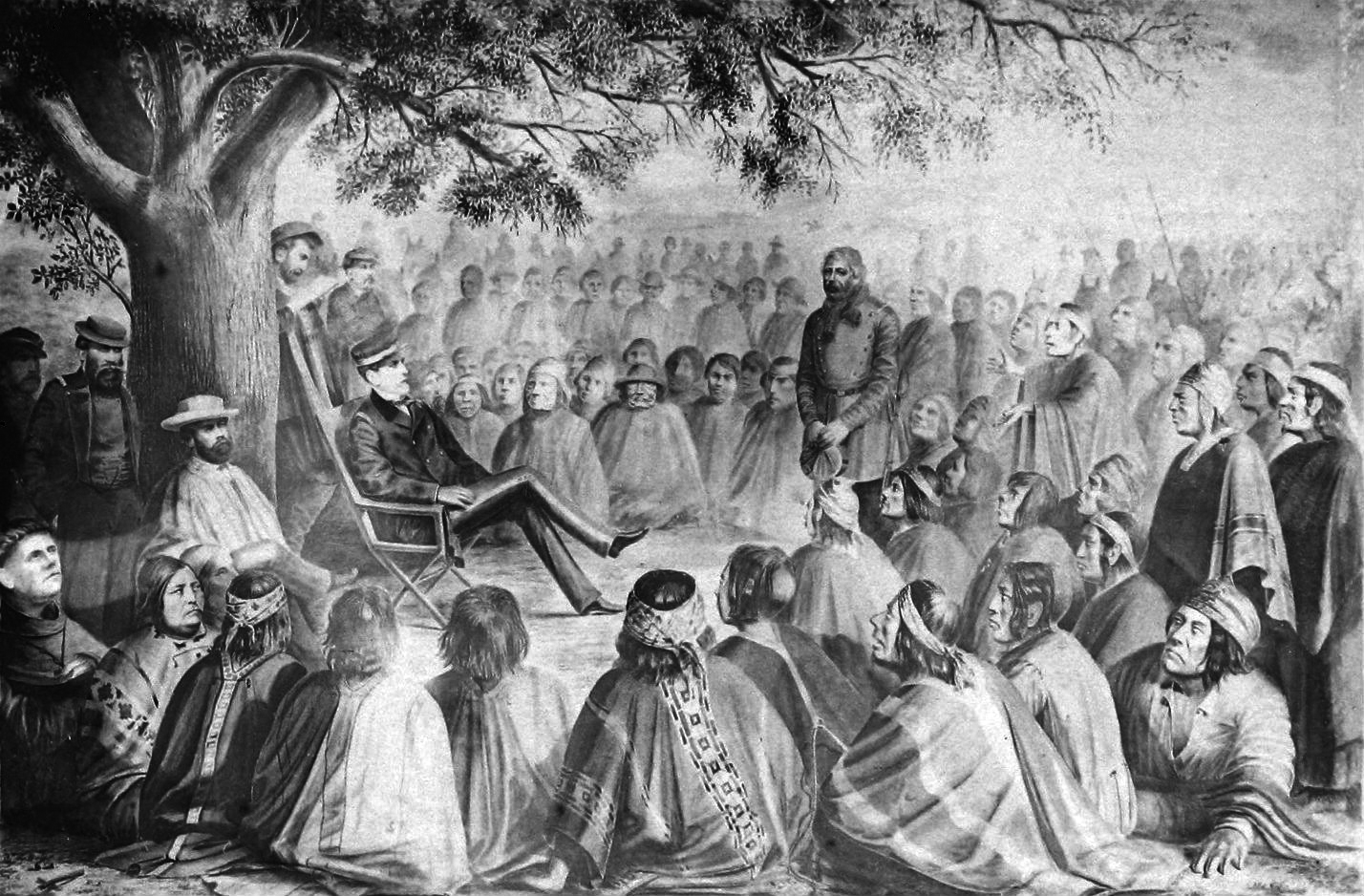
Cornelio Saavedra Rodríguez in meeting with the main lonkos of Araucania in 1869

In the nineteenth century, Argentina and Chile experienced a fast territorial expansion. Argentina established a colony at the Falkland Islands in 1820, settled Chubut with Welsh immigrants in 1865 and conquered Formosa, Misiones and Chaco from Paraguay in 1870. Later Argentina would also annex the Puna de Atacama in 1898. Chile on the other hand, established a colony at the Strait of Magellan in 1843, settled Valdivia, Osorno, and Llanquihue with German immigrants, and conquered land from Peru and Bolivia. Later Chile would also annex Easter Island. In this context, Mapuche controlled territory began to be conquered by Argentina and Chile due to two reasons. First, the Argentinean and Chilean states aimed for territorial continuity, and second it remained the sole place for Argentinean livestock to expand and Chilean agriculture to expand.

Between 1861 and 1879 Argentina and Chile incorporated several Mapuche territories to their controlled territory. In January 1881, with Chile having decisively defeated Peru in the battles of Chorrillos and Miraflores, Chile and Argentina resumed the conquest of Mapuche controlled lands.

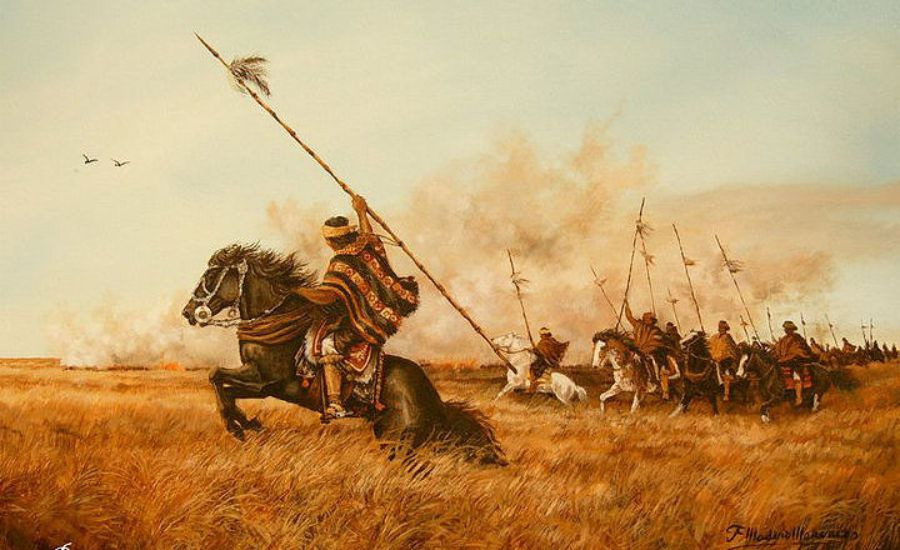
Mapuche war party led by Calfucurá

The conquest of Araucanía caused numerous Mapuches to be displaced and forced to roam in search of shelter and food. Scholar Pablo Miramán claims the introduction of state education during the Occupation of Araucanía had detrimental effects on traditional Mapuche education. Chile finally achieved the occupation and integration of the territories south of the Biobío River in 1884 when the last communities surrendered, and the cities of Villarrica and previously Angol were reestablished. Schools, cities, and legal systems were established, incorporating inhabitants into the national framework.

The rural-to-urban migration of the Mapuche people in the 20th century can be divided into two main stages: economic migration, which intensified from the 1920s and peaked in the 1950s and 1960s, and political migration following the 1973 coup. Economic migration initially responded to the need for jobs in cities, such as Santiago, where Mapuche arrived in the 1920s to work in bakeries and formed organizations like the "Sociedad Galvarino." This migration flow was accentuated by industrial growth and the lack of rural opportunities. By 1961, it was estimated that up to 25% of the Mapuche population lived outside traditional communities, though data was incomplete, and censuses did not differentiate between Mapuche and non-Mapuche citizens.

Despite its impact, statistics on Mapuche rural-to-urban migration have historically been insufficient, marked by integrationist policies that did not account for their Indigenous identity but treated them as citizens. Forced community divisions under laws such as the 1931 Decree with Force of Law No. 266 and the record-breaking divisions under Decree-Law No. 2568 of 1979 contributed to land fragmentation and forced migration to cities. In the 1952 census, only 875 Mapuche were recorded in Santiago, a figure significantly lower than independent estimates, such as Domingo Curaqueo's, which identified 10 000 Mapuche over the age of 21 in the same province.

Ancient flag of the Mapuche on the Arauco War.

In the years following the occupation the economy of Araucanía changed from being based on sheep and cattle herding to one based on agriculture and wood extraction. About 70% of the Mapuche Territory left in the hands of Argentina, the loss of land by Mapuches following the occupation caused severe erosion since Mapuches continued to practice a massive livestock herding in limited areas.

== Modern political conflict (1990–present) ==
The term "Wallmapu" began to gain widespread use outside Mapudungun-speaking communities after the Council of All Lands adopted its Mapudungun name, Aukiñ Wallmapu Ngulam, upon the organization's founding in 1990. It arose in response to what Indigenous movements describe as "repression" and the perceived disregard of land deeds (Títulos de Merced). This was accompanied by a wave of Mapuche migration from the south-central region to major Chilean cities during the Chilean military dictatorship and before. The council was notable for engaging in historical revisionism and adopting political stances opposing the Chilean state's interests in the region, particularly regarding demands for "ancestral land recovery" and "political territorial autonomy for the Mapuche people." This movement also included the creation of the Wenufoye national Mapuche flag in 1992, along with five additional flags representing key Mapuche territories in southern Chile. Since 2005, the term has also been promoted by the Mapuche nationalist party Wallmapuwen.

The Chilean historian Cristóbal García Huidobro states that: "the terminology ‘Wallmapu’ is not a relatively old one, but rather a newer one. It arises, as far as it has been understood, from a revisionist movement, at the beginning of the 1990s (...) they make a re-study and a revisionism of the identity, of the language, as well as of the symbols that would represent the Mapuche people (...) it is not a historical question as such, it does not come from the ancestral culture of the Mapuche people who never perceived their territory as a particularly defined place". The term means "Universe" ancestrally in the Mapuche language.

The construction of the Ralco Hydroelectric Plant, which displaced Indigenous burial sites, was a breaking point in state-Mapuche relations, contributing to the formation of the Coordinadora Arauco-Malleco (CAM) in December 1997 following the burning of three trucks belonging to Forestal Arauco. This first attack marks the beginning of the period of violence in the Southern Macrozone of Chile and a turning point in the development of the Mapuche autonomist political movement. Since then, violence has progressively increased and expanded to the neighboring regions of Biobío and Los Lagos.

Land disputes and violent confrontations continue in some Mapuche areas, particularly in the northern sections of the Araucanía region between and around Traiguén and Lumaco. In 2003, the Commission for Historical Truth and New Treatments issued a report to defuse tensions calling for drastic changes in Chile's treatment of its Indigenous people, more than 80% of whom are Mapuche. The recommendations included the formal recognition of political and "territorial" rights for Indigenous peoples, as well as efforts to promote their cultural identities.

Though Japanese and Swiss interests are active in the economy of Araucanía (Ngulu Mapu), the two chief forestry companies are Chilean-owned. In the past, the firms have planted hundreds of thousands of hectares with non-native species such as Monterey pine, Douglas firs, and eucalyptus trees, sometimes replacing native Valdivian forests, although such substitution and replacement is now forgotten.

Chile exports wood to the United States, almost all of which comes from this southern region, with an annual value of around $600 million. Stand.earth, a conservation group, has led an international campaign for preservation, resulting in the Home Depot chain and other leading wood importers agreeing to revise their purchasing policies to "provide for the protection of native forests in Chile". Some Mapuche leaders want stronger protections for the forests.

Alleged crimes committed by Mapuche armed insurgents have been prosecuted under counter-terrorism legislation, originally introduced by the military dictatorship of Augusto Pinochet to control political dissidents. The law allows prosecutors to withhold evidence from the defense for up to six months and to conceal the identity of witnesses, who may give evidence in court behind screens. Insurgent groups, such as the Coordinadora Arauco Malleco, use multiple tactics with the more extreme occurrences such as the burning of homes, churches, vehicles, structures, and pastures, which at times included causing deaths and threats to specific targets. As of 2005, protesters from Mapuche communities have used these tactics against properties of both multinational forestry corporations and private individuals. In 2010 the Mapuche launched many hunger strikes in attempts to effect change in the anti-terrorism legislation.

As of 2019, the Chilean government committed human rights abuses against the Mapuche based on Israeli military techniques and surveillance.

In May 2022, the Chamber of Deputies of Chile declared the Coordinadora Arauco-Malleco, Resistencia Mapuche Malleco, Resistencia Mapuche Lafkenche, and Weichán Auka Mapu as "illegal terrorist organizations".

Oil exploitation and fracking in the Vaca Muerta site in Neuquen, one of the biggest shale-oil and shale-gas deposits in the world, has produced waste dumps of sludge waste, polluting the environment close to the town of Añelo, which is about 1,200 km south of Buenos Aires. In 2018, the Mapuche were suing Exxon, French company TotalEnergies and Pan American Energy.

== Culture ==
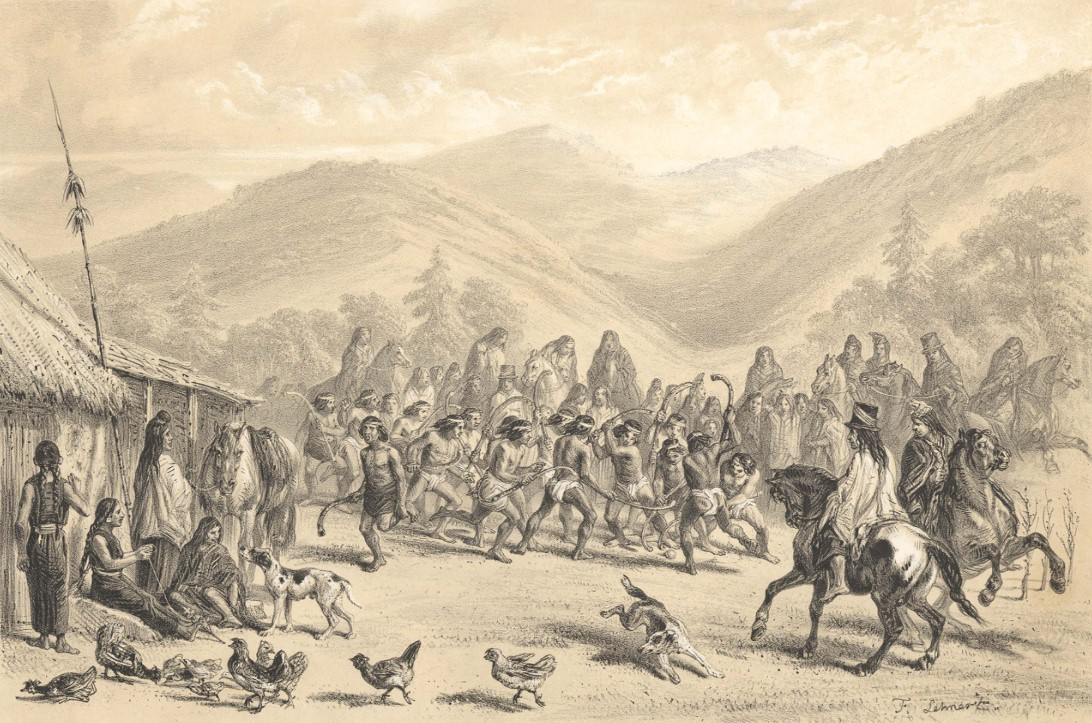
Mapuche playing chueca, by Claude Gay, 1854

At the time of the arrival of Europeans, the Mapuche organized and constructed a network of forts and defensive buildings. Ancient Mapuche also built ceremonial constructions such as some earthwork mounds discovered near Purén. Mapuche quickly adopted iron metal-working (Picunches already worked copper) Mapuche learned horse riding and the use of cavalry in war from the Spaniards, along with the cultivation of wheat and sheep.

In the 300-year co-existence between the Spanish colonies and the relatively well-delineated autonomous Mapuche regions, the Mapuche also developed a strong tradition of trading with Spaniards, Argentines, and Chileans. Such trade lies at the heart of the Mapuche silver-working tradition, for Mapuche wrought their jewelry from the large and widely dispersed quantity of Spanish, Argentine, and Chilean silver coins. Mapuche also made headdresses with coins, which were called trarilonko, etc.

=== Mapuche languages ===
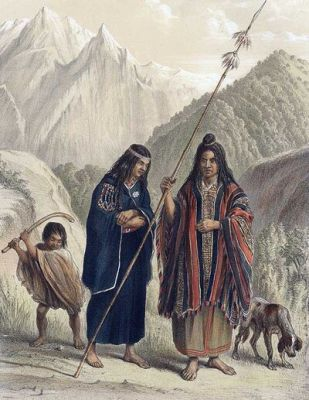
Familia Mapuche, by Claudio Gay, 1848.

Mapuche languages are spoken in Chile and Argentina. The two living branches are Huilliche and Mapudungun. Although not genetically related, lexical influence has been discerned from Quechua. Linguists estimate that only about 200,000 full-fluency speakers remain in Chile. The language receives only token support in the educational system. In recent years, it has started to be taught in rural schools of Bío-Bío, Araucanía, and Los Lagos Regions.

Mapuche speakers of Chilean Spanish who also speak Mapudungun tend to use more impersonal pronouns when speaking Spanish.

=== Cosmology and beliefs ===
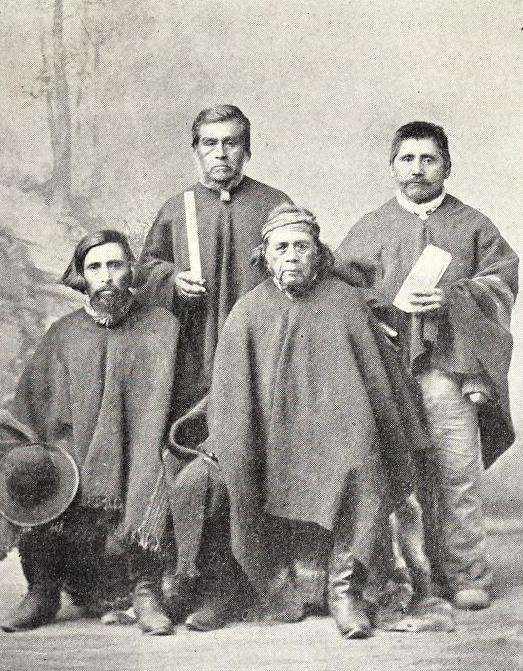
A council of Araucanian philosophers, 1904

Central to Mapuche cosmology is the idea of a creator called ngenechen, who is embodied in four components: an older man (fucha/futra/cha chau), an older woman (kude/kuse), a young man, and a young woman. They believe in worlds known as the Wenu Mapu and Minche Mapu. Also, Mapuche cosmology is informed by complex notions of spirits that coexist with humans and animals in the natural world, and daily circumstances can dictate spiritual practices.

The most well-known Mapuche ritual ceremony is the Ngillatun, which loosely translates as "to pray" or "general prayer". These ceremonies are often major communal events that are of extreme spiritual and social importance. Many other ceremonies are practiced, and not all are for public or communal participation but are sometimes limited to family.

The main groups of deities and/or spirits in Mapuche mythology are the Pillan and Wangulen (ancestral spirits), the Ngen (spirits in nature), and the wekufe (evil spirits).

Central to Mapuche belief is the role of the machi (shaman). It is usually filled by a woman, following an apprenticeship with an older machi, and has many of the characteristics typical of shamans. The machi performs ceremonies for curing diseases, warding off evil, influencing weather, harvests, social interactions, and dreamwork. Machis often have extensive knowledge of regional medicinal herbs. As biodiversity in the Chilean countryside has declined due to commercial agriculture and forestry, the dissemination of such knowledge has also declined, but the Mapuche people are reviving it in their communities. Machis have an extensive knowledge of sacred stones and sacred animals.

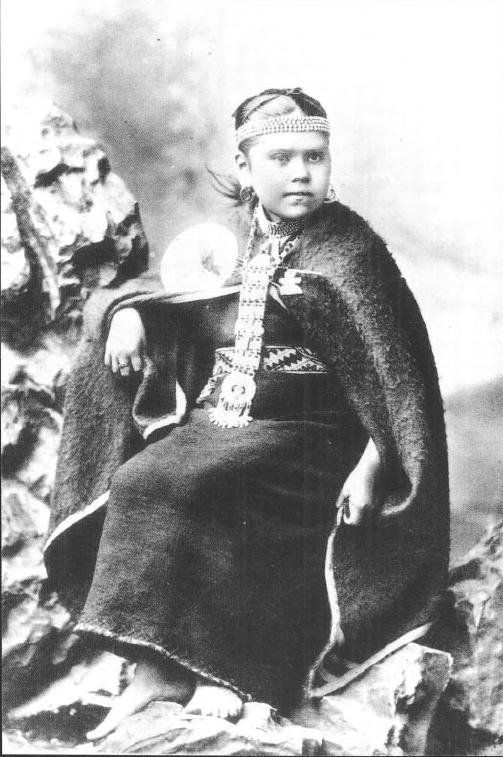
The daughter of lonko Quilapán

Like many cultures, the Mapuche have a deluge myth (epeu) of a major flood in which the world is destroyed and recreated. The myth involves two opposing forces: Kai Kai (water, which brings death through floods) and Tren Tren (dry earth, which brings sunshine). In the deluge almost all humanity is drowned; the few not drowned survive through cannibalism. At last, only one couple is left. A machi tells them that they must give their only child to the waters, which they do, and this restores order to the world.

Part of the Mapuche ritual is prayer and animal sacrifice, required to maintain the cosmic balance. This belief has continued to current times. In 1960, for example, a machi sacrificed a young boy, throwing him into the water after an earthquake and a tsunami.

The Mapuche have incorporated the remembered history of their long independence and resistance from 1540 (Spanish and then Chileans and Argentines) and of the treaty with the Chilean and Argentine governments in the 1870s. Memories, stories, and beliefs, often very local and particularized, are a significant part of the Mapuche traditional culture. To varying degrees, this history of resistance continues to this day amongst the Mapuche. At the same time, a large majority of Mapuche in Chile identify with the state as Chilean, similar to a large majority in Argentina identifying as Argentines.

=== Ethnobotany ===
Height of a chemamull (Mapuche funeral statue) compared to a person.

=== Ceremonies and traditions ===
We Tripantu is the Mapuche New Year celebration.

=== Textiles ===
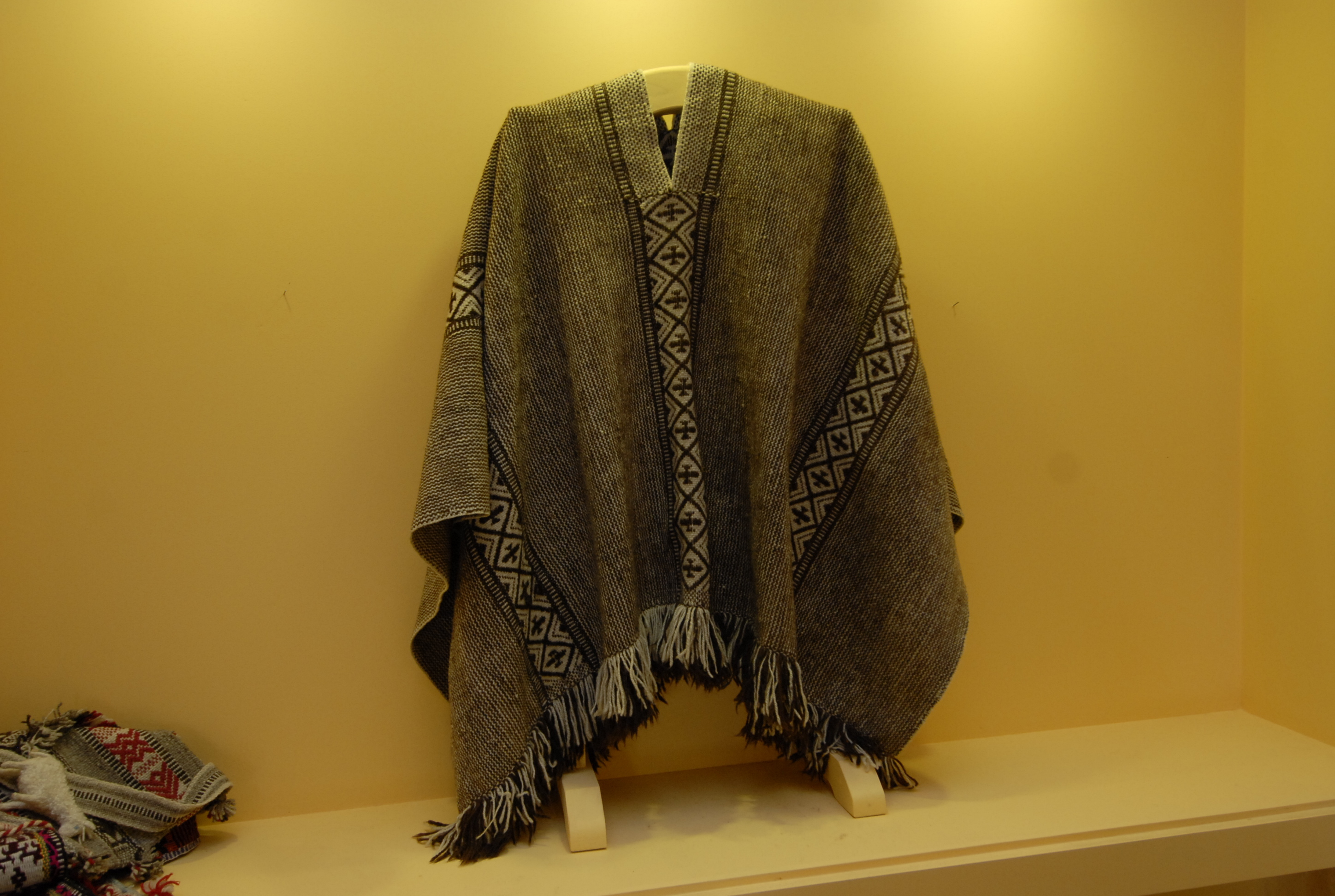
Traditional Mapuche poncho exhibited in Museo Artesanía Chilena.

One of the best-known arts of the Mapuche is their textiles. The oldest data on textiles in the southernmost areas of the American continent (southern Chile and Argentina today) are found in some archaeological excavations, such as those of Pitrén Cemetery near the city of Temuco, and the Alboyanco site in the Biobío Region, both of Chile; and the Rebolledo Arriba Cemetery in Neuquén Province (Argentina). researchers have found evidence of fabrics made with complex techniques and designs, dated between AD 1300–1350.

The Mapuche women were responsible for spinning and weaving. Knowledge of both weaving techniques and textile patterns particular to the locality was usually transmitted within the family, with mothers, grandmothers, and aunts teaching a girl the skills they had learned from their elders. Women who excelled in the textile arts were highly honored for their accomplishments and contributed economically and culturally to their kinship group. A measure of the importance of weaving is evident in the expectation that a man gives a larger dowry for a bride who was an accomplished weaver.

In addition, the Mapuche used their textiles as an important surplus and an exchange trading good. Numerous sixteenth-century accounts describe their bartering the textiles with other Indigenous peoples, and with colonists in newly developed settlements. Such trading enabled the Mapuche to obtain those goods that they did not produce or held in high esteem, such as horses. Tissue volumes made by Aboriginal women and marketed in the Araucanía and the north of Patagonia Argentina were considerable and constituted a vital economic resource for Indigenous families. The production of fabrics in the time before European settlement was intended for uses beyond domestic consumption.

At present, the fabrics woven by the Mapuche continue to be used for domestic purposes, as well as for gift, sale, or barter. Most Mapuche women and their families now wear garments with foreign designs and tailored with materials of industrial origin, but they continue to weave ponchos, blankets, bands, and belts for regular use. Many of the fabrics are woven for trade, and in many cases, are an important source of income for families. Glazed pots are used to dye the wool.

Many Mapuche women continue to weave fabrics according to the customs of their ancestors and transmit their knowledge in the same way: within domestic life, from mother to daughter, and from grandmothers to granddaughters. This form of learning is based on gestural imitation, and only rarely, and when strictly necessary, the apprentice receives explicit instructions or help from their instructors. Knowledge is transmitted as the fabric is woven, the weaving and transmission of knowledge go together.

=== Clava hand-club ===
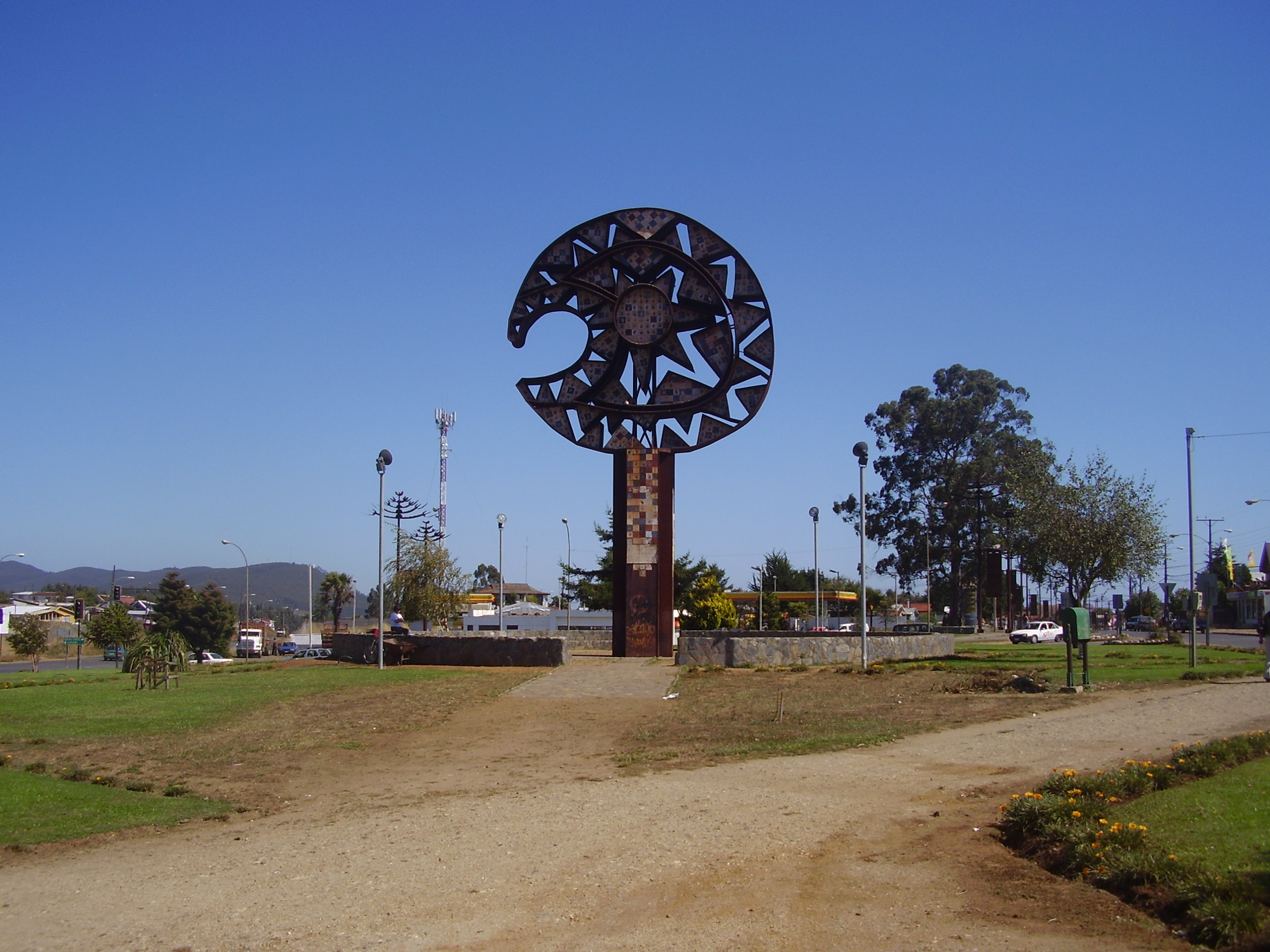
Monument in the form of a gigantic clava mere okewa, located in Avenida Presidente Eduardo Frei Montalva, Cañete, Chile

There is a traditional stone hand club used by the Mapuche which has been called a clava (Spanish for club). It has a long flat body. Another name is clava mere okewa; in Spanish, it may also be called a clava cefalomorfa. It has some ritual importance as a special sign of distinction carried by tribal chiefs. Many kinds of clubs are known.

This is an object associated with masculine power. It consists of a disk with an attached handle; the edge of the disc usually has a semicircular recess. In many cases, the face portrayed on the disc carries incised designs. The handle is cylindrical, generally with a larger diameter at its connection to the disk.

=== Silverwork ===
Drawing of a trapelacucha, a silver finery piece.

In the later half of the eighteenth century, Mapuche silversmiths began to produce large amounts of silver finery. The surge of silversmithing activity may be related to the 1726 parliament of Negrete that decreased hostilities between Spaniards and Mapuches and allowed trade to increase between colonial Chile and the free Mapuches. In this context of increasing trade Mapuches began in the late eighteenth century to accept payments in silver coins for their products, usually cattle or horses. These coins and silver coins obtained in political negotiations served as raw material for Mapuche metalsmiths (Mapudungun: rüxafe). Old Mapuche silver pendants often included unmelted silver coins, something that has helped modern researchers to date the objects. The bulk of the Spanish silver coins originated from mining in Potosí in Upper Peru.

The great diversity in silver finery designs is because designs were made to be identified with different reynma (families), lof mapu (lands) as well as specific lonkos and machis. Mapuche silver finery was also subject to changes in fashion albeit designs associated with philosophical and spiritual concepts have not undergone major changes.

In the late eighteenth century and early nineteenth century, Mapuche silversmithing activity and artistic diversity reached its climax. All important Mapuche chiefs of the nineteenth century are supposed to have had at least one silversmith. By 1984 Mapuche scholar Carlos Aldunate noted that there were no silversmiths alive among contemporary Mapuches.

=== Literature ===
The Mapuche culture of the sixteenth century had an oral tradition and lacked a writing system. Since that time, a writing system for Mapudungun was developed, and Mapuche writings in both Spanish and Mapudungun have flourished. Contemporary Mapuche literature can be said to be composed of an oral tradition and Spanish-Mapudungun bilingual writings. Notable Mapuche poets include Sebastián Queupul, Pedro Alonzo, Elicura Chihuailaf, and Leonel Lienlaf.

=== Cogender views ===
Among the Mapuche in La Araucanía, in addition to heterosexual female machi shamanesses, there are homosexual male machi weye shamans, who wear female clothing. These machi weye were first described in Spanish in a chronicle of 1673. Among the Mapuche, "the spirits are interested in machi's gendered discourses and performances, not in the sex under the machi's clothes". In attracting the filew (possessing spirit), "Both male and female machi become spiritual brides who seduce and call their filew – at once husband and master – to possess their heads ... The ritual transvestism of male machi ... draws attention to the relational gender categories of spirit husband and machi wife as a couple (kurewen)." As concerning "co-gendered identities" of "machi as co-gender specialists", it has been speculated that "female berdaches" may have formerly existed among the Mapuche.

Currently, there's movement from communities, such as lof, activist and artistic groups for the presence of Mapuche queer identities and their validity and existence in traditional indigenous spaces, from the publication of books, newspapers, articles, exhibits, performances and just participation as teachers or organizers in trawün (reunions with people from different communities to share information, celebrate events, among other things), koneltün (long stay events with the purpose of teaching, usually for learning mapudungun) and kimeltün (classes) spaces.

== Mapuche, Chileans, and the Chilean state ==
Following the independence of Chile in the 1810s, the Mapuche began to be perceived as Chilean by other Chileans, contrasting with previous perceptions of them as a separate people or nation. However, not everybody agreed; 19th-century Argentine writer and president Domingo Faustino Sarmiento presented his view of the Mapuche-Chile relation by stating:

Between two Chilean provinces (Concepción and Valdivia) there is a piece of land that is not a province, its language is different, it is inhabited by other people and it can still be said that it is not part of Chile. Yes, Chile is the name of the country over where its flag waves and its laws are obeyed.

=== Civilizing mission discourses and scientific racism ===
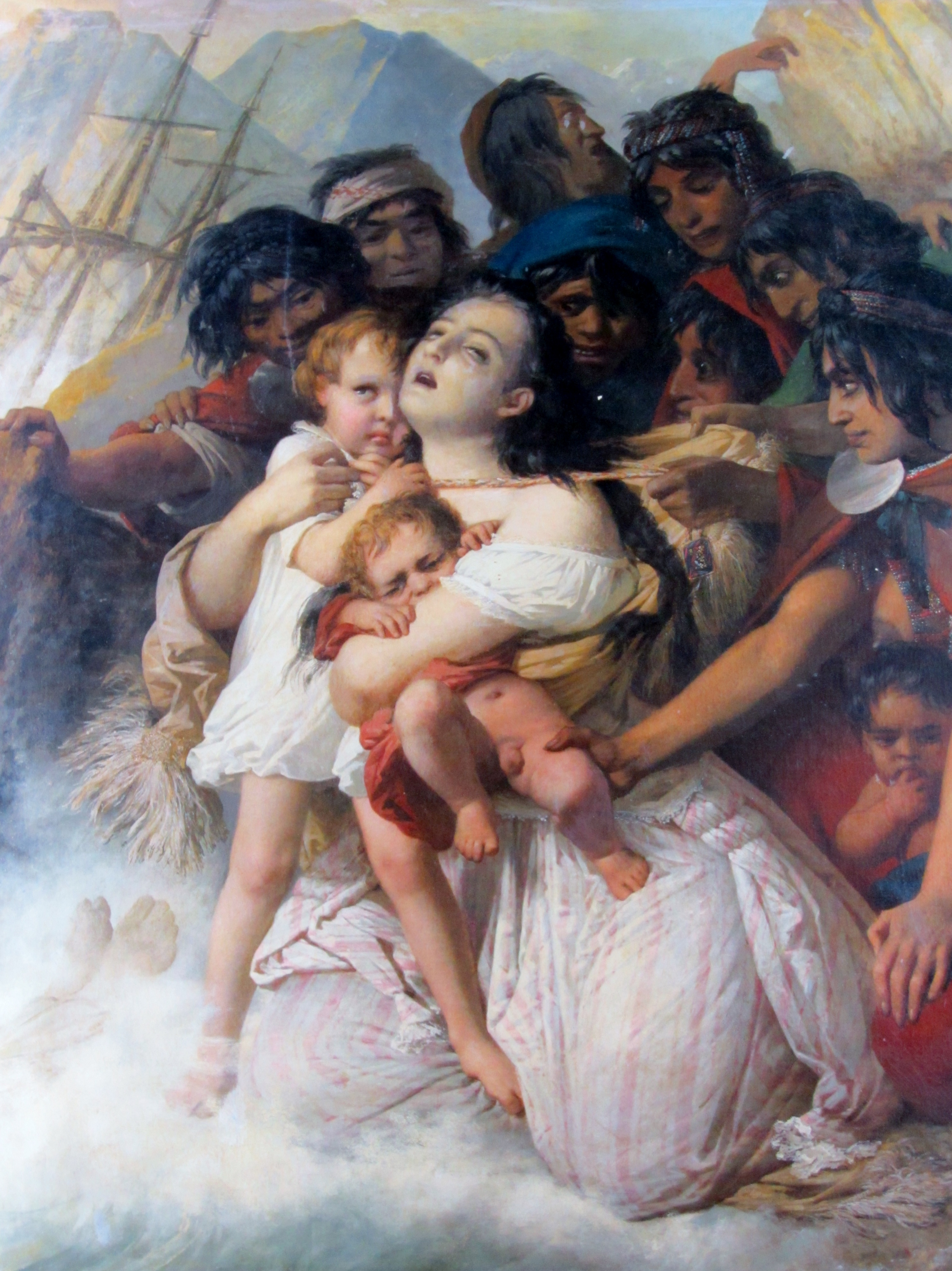
Painting by Raymond Monvoisin showing Elisa Bravo who was said to have survived the 1849 wreck of Joven Daniel to be then kidnapped by Mapuches.

The events surrounding the wreck of Joven Daniel at the coast of Araucanía in 1849 are considered an "inflection point" or "point of no return" in the relations between Mapuches and the Chilean state. It cemented views of Mapuches as brutal barbarians and showed in the view of many that Chilean authorities' earlier goodwill was naive.

There are various recorded instances in the nineteenth century when Mapuches were the subject of civilizing mission discourses by elements of the Chilean government and military. For example, Cornelio Saavedra Rodríguez called in 1861 for Mapuches to submit to Chilean state authority and "enter into reduction and civilization". When the Mapuches were finally defeated in 1883 President Domingo Santa María declared:

The country has with satisfaction seen the problem of the reduction of the whole Araucanía solved. This event, so important to our social and political life, and so significant for the future of the republic, has ended, happily and with costly and painful sacrifices. Today the whole Araucanía is subjugated, more than to the material forces, to the moral and civilizing force of the republic ...

The Chilean race, as everybody knows, is a mestizo race made of Spanish conquistadors and the Araucanian ...

— Nicolás Palacios in La raza chilena, p. 34.

After the War of the Pacific (1879–1883) there was a rise of racial and national superiority ideas among the Chilean ruling class. It was in this context that Chilean physician Nicolás Palacios hailed the Mapuche "race" arguing from a scientific racist and nationalist point of view. He considered the Mapuche superior to other tribes and the Chilean mestizo a blend of Mapuches and Visigothic elements from Spain. The writings of Palacios became later influential among Chilean Nazis.

As a result of the Occupation of Araucanía (1861–1883) and the War of the Pacific, Chile had incorporated territories with new Indigenous populations. Mapuches obtained relatively favourable views as "primordial" Chileans contrasting with other Indigenous peoples like the Aymara who were perceived as "foreign elements".

=== Contemporary attitudes ===
Since some four years ago a History of the Civilization in Araucanía has been published in the said Anales in which our indigenous ancestors are treated like savages, cruel, depraved, lacking morals, lacking warrior skills ...

— Nicolás Palacios, La raza chilena, p. 62.

Contemporary attitudes towards Mapuches on the part of non-Indigenous people in Chile are highly individual and heterogeneous. Nevertheless, a considerable part of the non-Indigenous people in Chile have a prejudiced and discriminatory attitude towards Mapuche. In a 2003 study, it was found that among the sample, 41% of people over 60 years old, 35% of people of low socioeconomic standing, 35% of the supporters of right-wing parties, 36% of Protestants, and 26% of Catholics were prejudiced against Indigenous peoples in Chile. In contrast, only 8% of those who attended university, 16% of supporters of left-wing parties, and 19% of people aged 18–29 were prejudiced. Specific prejudices about the Mapuche are that the Mapuches are lazy and alcoholic; to some lesser degree, Mapuche are sometimes judged antiquated and dirty.

In the 20th century, many Mapuche women migrated to large cities to work as domestic workers (Spanish: nanas mapuches). In Santiago, many of these women settled in Cerro Navia and La Pintana. Sociologist Éric Fassin has called the occurrence of Mapuche domestic workers a continuation of colonial relations of servitude.

Wenufoye flag created in 1992 by the Indigenist organization "Consejo de Todas las Tierras".

Historian Gonzalo Vial claimed that the Republic of Chile owes a "historical debt" to the Mapuche. The Coordinadora Arauco-Malleco claims to have the goal of a "national liberation" of Mapuche, with their regaining sovereignty over their lands. Reportedly there is a tendency among female Mapuche activists to reject feminism as they consider their struggle to go beyond gender.

== Mapuches and the Argentine state ==
Flag of Argentinian Tehuelche-Mapuche

19th-century Argentine authorities aiming to incorporate the Pampas and Patagonia into national territory recognized the Puelmapu Mapuche's strong connections with Chile. This gave Chile a certain influence over the Pampas. Argentine authorities feared that in an eventual war with Chile over Patagonia, Mapuches would align themselves with Chile. In this context, Estanislao Zeballos published the work La Conquista de quince mil leguas (The Fifteen Thousand League Conquest) in 1878, which had been commissioned by the Argentine Ministry of War. In La Conquista de quince mil leguas Mapuches were presented as Chileans who were bound to return to Chile. Mapuches were thus indirectly considered foreign enemies. Such a notion fitted well with the expansionist designs of Nicolás Avellaneda and Julio Argentino Roca for Puelmapu. The notion of Mapuches as Chileans is however an anachronism as Mapuches precede the formation of the modern state of Chile. By 1920 Argentine Nacionalismo revived the idea of Mapuches being Chileans, in strong contrast with 20th-century scholars based in Chile such as Ricardo E. Latcham and Francisco Antonio Encina who advanced a theory that Mapuches originated east of the Andes before penetrating what came to be Chile.

As late as 2017 Argentine historian Roberto E. Porcel wrote in a communiqué to the National Academy of History that those who often claim to be Mapuches in Argentina would be rather Mestizos, emboldened by European-descent supporters, who "lack any right for their claims and violence, not only for NOT being most of them Araucanians [sic], but also because they [the Araucanians] do not rank among our indigenous peoples".

== Modern politics ==
In the 1935 local elections, Herminia Aburto Colihueque was the first Mapuche woman to run for public office, although she was not elected.

In the 2017 Chilean general election, the first two Mapuche women were elected to the Chilean Congress; Aracely Leuquén Uribe from National Renewal and Emilia Nuyado from the Socialist Party.

Other Mapuche politicians include Victorino Antilef, Alexis Caiguan, Rosa Catrileo, Francisco Huenchumilla, Francisca Linconao, Natividad Llanquileo, Elisa Loncón, Adolfo Millabur, and Luz Vidal.

== In popular culture ==
- The football club Colo-Colo named their team after the Mapuche leader Colocolo in 1925.
- In 2002, a species of Argentinian lizard, Liolaemus mapuche, was named in honor of the Mapuche people.
- The 2006 novel Inés of My Soul by Isabel Allende features the conquest of Chile by Pedro Valdivia, and a large part of the book deals with the Mapuche conflict.
- In 2012, renowned Mapuche weaver Anita Paillamil collaborated with Chilean artist Guillermo Bert to create "Encoded Textiles", an exhibit that combined traditional Mapuche textile weaving with QR code designs.
- The 2016 video game Civilization VI features the Mapuche as a playable civilization in the Rise and Fall expansion. Their leader is Lautaro, a young Mapuche toqui known for leading the Indigenous resistance against Spanish conquest in Chile.
- The 2020 Chilean-Brazilian animated film Nahuel and the Magic Book is set in southern Chile and is based on Mapuche mythology.

== See also ==
- Guaraní people
- Flag of the Mapuches
- Guñelve
- Wekufe
- Pillan

== Bibliography ==
- Alvarado, Margarita (2002), "El esplendor del adorno: El poncho y el chanuntuku", in Hijos del Viento, Arte de los Pueblos del Sur, Siglo XIX. Buenos Aires: Fundación PROA.
- Bengoa, José (2000). Historia del pueblo mapuche: Siglos XIX y XX (7th ed.). LOM Ediciones. ISBN 956-282-232-X.
- Brugnoli, Paulina y Hoces de la Guardia, Soledad (1995). "Estudio de fragmentos del sitio Alboyanco", in Hombre y Desierto, una perspectiva cultural, 9: 375–381.
- Corcuera, Ruth (1987). Herencia textil andina. Buenos Aires: Impresores SCA.
- Corcuera, Ruth (1998). Ponchos de las Tierras del Plata. Buenos Aires: Fondo Nacional de las Artes.
- Chertudi, Susana y Nardi, Ricardo (1961). "Tejidos Araucanos de la Argentina", in Cuadernos del Instituto Nacional de Investigaciones Folklóricas, 2: 97–182.
- Garavaglia, Juan Carlos (1986), "Los textiles de la tierra en el contexto colonial rioplatense: ¿una revolución industrial fallida?", in Anuario IEHS, 1:45–87.
- Joseph, Claude (1931). Los tejidos Araucanos. Santiago de Chile: Imprenta San Francisco, Padre Las Casas.
- Kradolfer, Sabine, Quand la parenté impose, le don dispose. Organisation sociale, don et identité dans les communautés mapuche de la province de Neuquén (Argentine) (Bern etc., Peter Lang, 2011) (Publications Universitaires Européennes. Série 19 B: Ethnologie-générale, 71).
- Mendez, Patricia (2009a). "Herencia textil, identidad indígena y recursos económicos en la Patagonia Argentina", in Revista de la Asociación de Antropólogos Iberoamericanos en Red, 4, 1:11–53.
- Méndez, Patricia (2009b). "Los tejidos indígenas en la Patagonia Argentina: cuatro siglos de comercio textili", in Anuario Indiana, 26: 233–265.
- Millán de Palavecino, María Delia (1960). “Vestimenta Argentina”. En: Cuadernos del Instituto Nacional de Investigaciones Folklóricas, 1: 95–127.
- Murra, John (1975). Formaciones económicas y políticas del mundo andino. Lima: Instituto de Estudios Peruanos.
- Nardi, Ricardo y Rolandi, Diana (1978). 1000 años de tejido en la Argentina. Buenos Aires: Ministerio de Cultura y Educación, Secretaría de Estado de Cultura, Instituto Nacional de Antropología.
- Painecura Antinao, Juan (2012). Charu. Sociedad y cosmovisión en la platería mapuche.
- Palermo, Miguel Angel (1994). "Economía y mujer en el sur argentino", in Memoria Americana 3: 63–90.
- Wilson, Angélica (1992). Arte de Mujeres. Santiago de Chile: Ed. CEDEM, Colección Artes y Oficios Nº 3.
