= Rehue =

Sacred altar of the Mapuche people

A rehue (Mapudungun spelling rewe) or kemukemu is a type of pillar-like sacred altar used by the Mapuche of Chile and Argentina in many of their ceremonies.

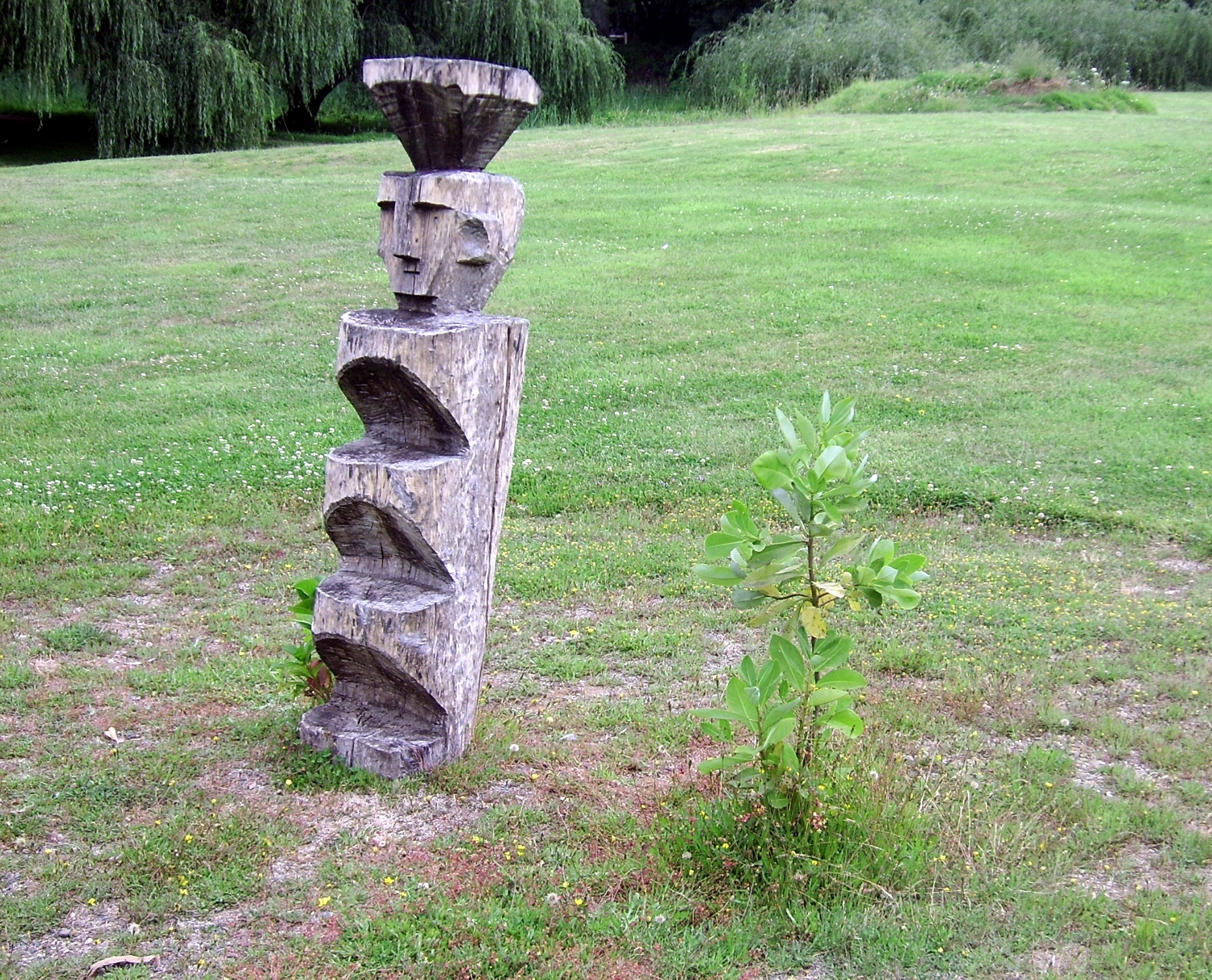
A rewe and canelo tree in the Austral University of Chile.

== Altar/Axis mundi ==
The rehue is a carved tree trunk set in the ground, surrounded by a hedge of colihue (a Chilean native bamboo) and adorned with white, blue or yellow flags and branches of coihue, maitén, lengas and other trees native to the Mapuche homeland. In form it recalls both a ladder and the human spine, having a series of steps (sometimes a mystical seven in number) cut into it, rising up from the earth toward a summit sometimes bearing a carving of a human face. It is a Mapuche representation of the axis mundi or shamanic world tree symbolising connection with the various levels of the cosmos and utilised as such by the machi (Mapuche shamans). The rehue is a symbol of great importance that is used in important celebrations or ceremonies like the Machitún, Guillatún, We Tripantu (Mapuche New Year) and others.

== Shamanic ritual tool ==
Each machi has a rehue outside her/his house which she/he climbs in the course of certain ceremonies. This is believed to contain power transmitted to it by Ngenechen, (the supreme being in Mapuche religion) and the machi's attendant pillan (supernatural beings bearing some similarity to the familiar spirits of Early Modern European witchcraft).

== Social and Political Unit ==
Called "rehue" or "regua" in colonial chronicles, the word referred to the grouping of various Mapuche families (lof or lov) who occupied the same locality and shared the same rehue altar. Nine of these rehue would form an Aillarehue (nine altars), a small confederation that would gather for war or other common purposes and formed a region or province.
