= Cautín River =

River in Chile

Coordinates: 38.7533°S 72.9806°W

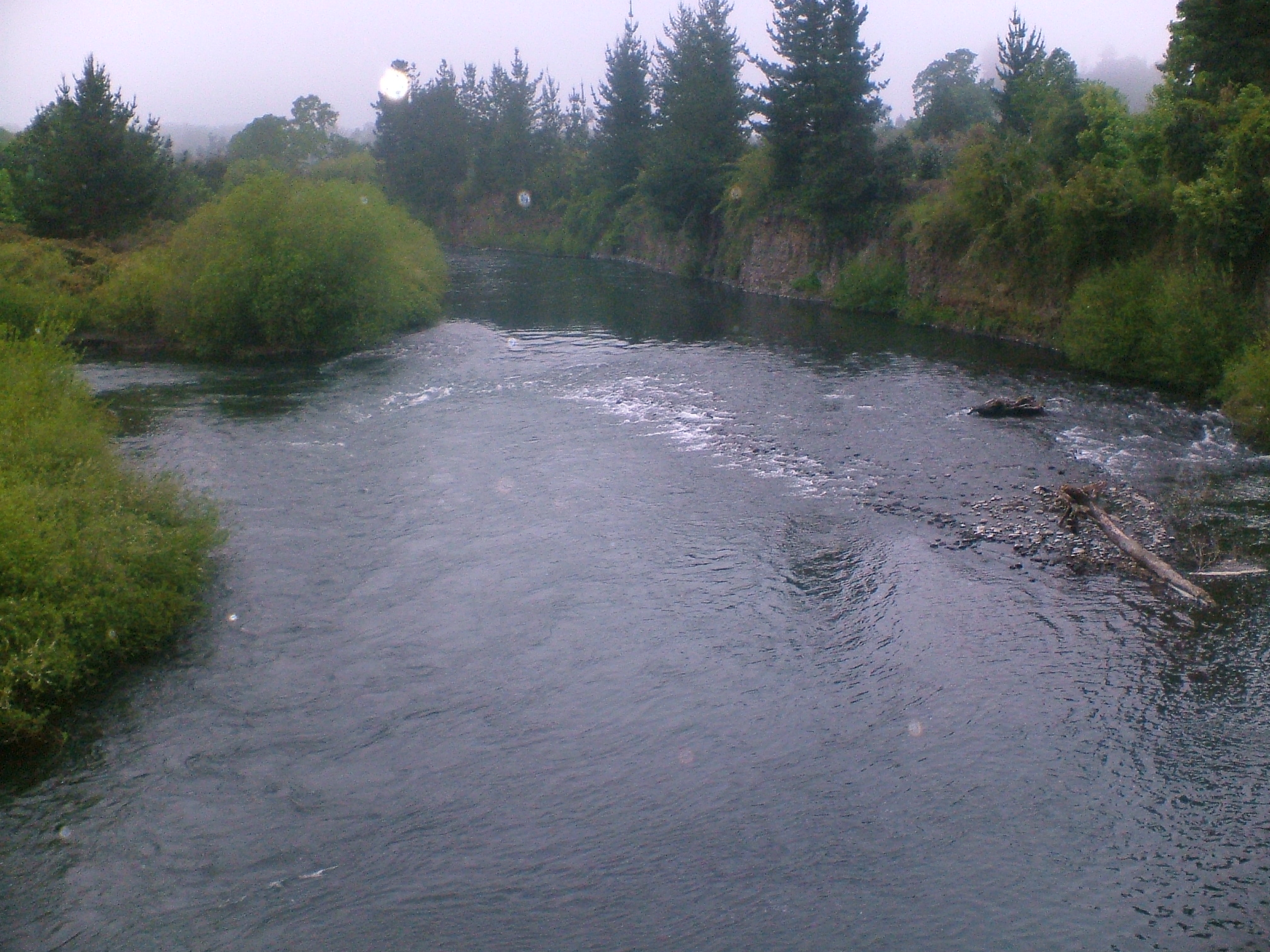
- Cautín River running through Temuco

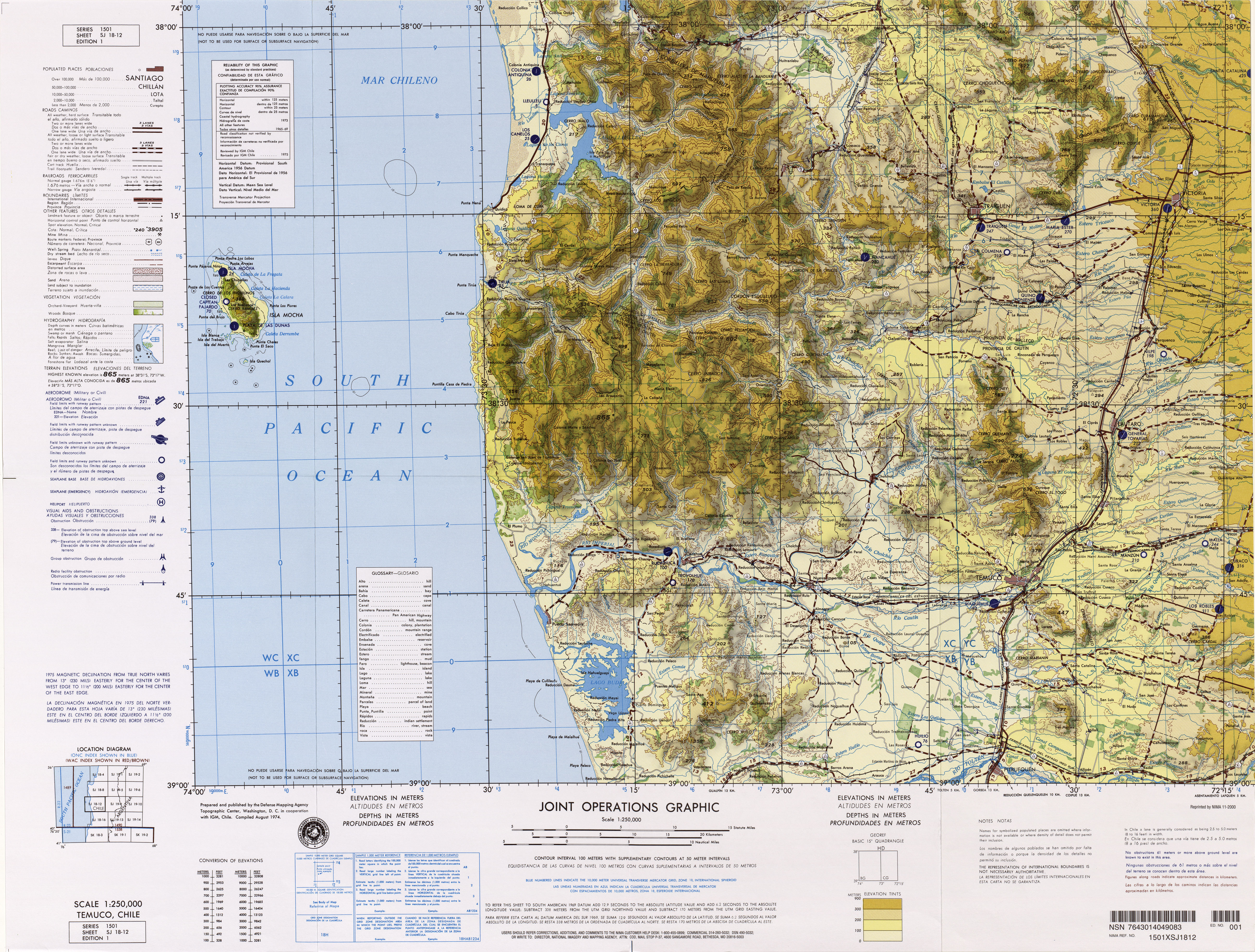
- Map of the Region of Temuco

Location
- Country: Chile

Physical characteristics
- Mouth
  - location: Imperial River
- Length: 174 km (108 mi)
- Basin size: 3,100 km^{2} (1,200 sq mi)

The Cautín (Rio Cautín) is a river in Chile. It rises on the western slopes of the Cordillera de Las Raíces and flows in La Araucanía Region. The river's main tributary is the Quepe River. The city of Temuco is located on the Cautín River.

== See also ==
- List of rivers of Chile
