= Moluche =

Chilean ethnic group

(Arauco) "chalky water"
- People: Moluche/Nguluche
- Language: Mapudungun
- Country: Araucanía

The Moluche ("people from where the sun sets" or "people from the west") or Nguluche are an Indigenous people of Chile. Their language was a dialect of Mapudungun, a Mapuche language. At the beginning of the Conquest of Chile by the Spanish Empire the Moluche lived in what came to be known as Araucanía. The Moluche were called Araucanos ("Araucanians") by the Spanish.

Descendants of the Moluche, Pehuenche and Huilliche later migrated into Argentina in later centuries mixing with the local tribes. This Araucanization made their language the common spoken language in the region.

== See also ==
- Picunche
