= Arauco War =

Conflict between Spanish settlers of Chile and indigenous peoples (16th–17th centuries)

- Part of the Spanish colonization of the Americas
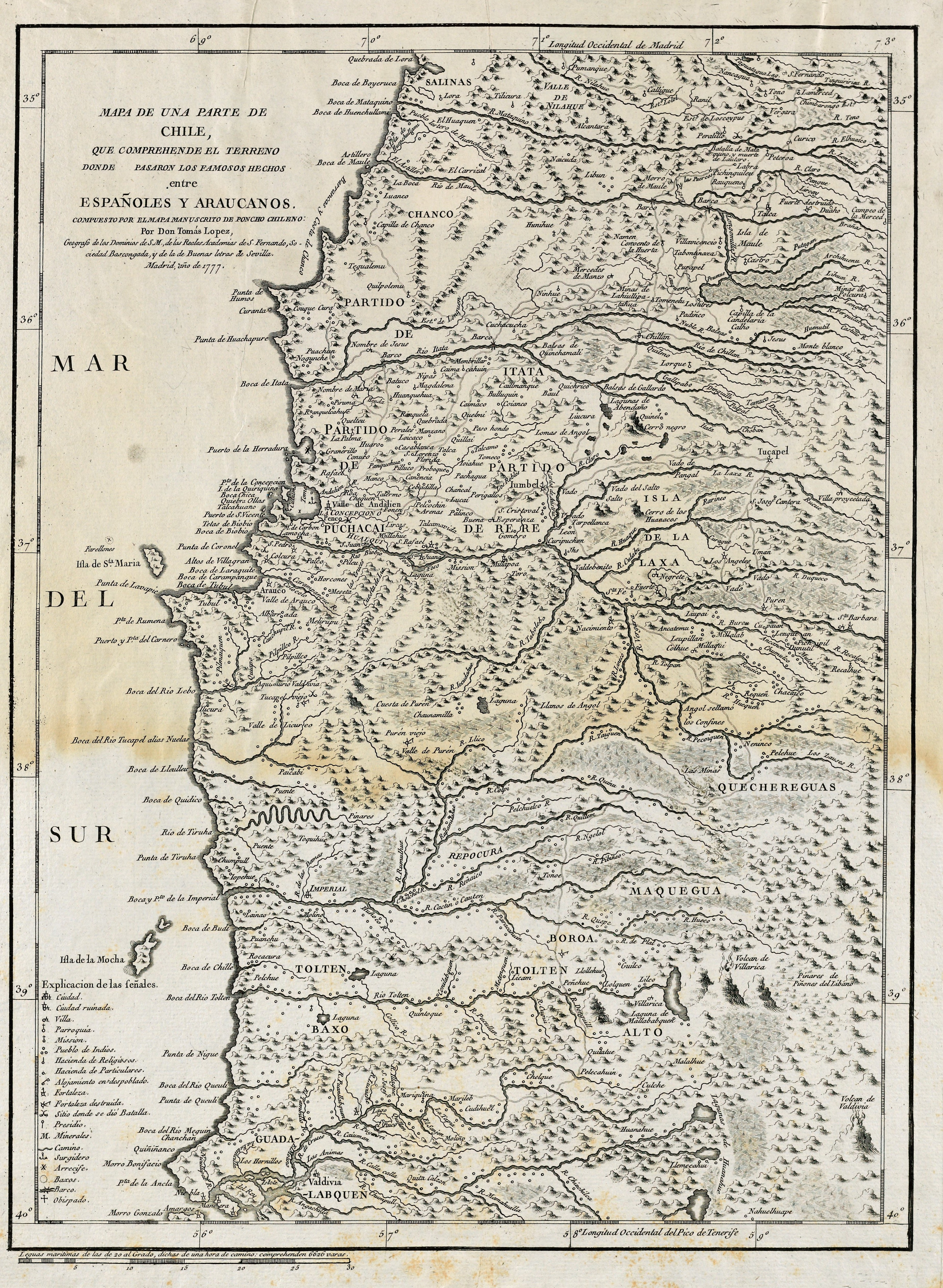
- Map of Araucanía from the 18th century, showing much of the territory where the war was fought
Date	Historiographic divergence: 1546 – until the end of the 17th century; and sporadically the 18th century; 1550–1662 (112 years); 1550–1656 (106 years)
Location	Araucanía region and surrounding regions of the Captaincy General of Chile (present-day Chile)
Result	Spanish invasion of Araucanía permanently reversed around 1600; Gradual Spanish reestablishment of rule south of Araucanía from 1645 to 1796; Failure of the Spanish evangelization strategy in Araucanía; Stabilization of frontiers, development of Mapuche–Spanish diplomacy and trade since the mid-17th century

Belligerents
Spanish Empire: Captaincy General of Chile; Viceroyalty of Peru (from 1557); Mapuche allies	Mapuche groups: Moluches; Nagches; Lafquenches; Pehuenches; Huilliches; Cuncos; Dutch Republic

Commanders and leaders
(Spanish Empire) Pedro de Valdivia (executed) (Spanish Empire) Francisco de Villagra (Spanish Empire) García de Mendoza (Spanish Empire) Rodrigo de Quiroga (Spanish Empire) Alonso de Sotomayor (Spanish Empire) Martín O. de Loyola † (Spanish Empire) Alonso de Ramón (Spanish Empire) Alonso de Ribera (Spanish Empire) Francisco de Vega (Spanish Empire) Pedro Casanate (Spanish Empire) Gabriel de Aponte and others	Ainavillo; Lautaro †; Caupolicán (executed); Colocolo; Galvarino (executed); Millalelmo; Loble; Pelantaru; Anganamón; Lientur; Butapichón; Alejo; Vilumilla; Curiñancu and others

Strength
Spanish forces: Spanish conquest companies (until 1557); Local detachments and recruits from other regions (1557–1604); Army of Arauco (1604 onward); Indian auxiliaries: Yanaconas; Indios reyunos	Mapuche warriors

Casualties and losses
1536–1662; 29,000 Spanish military dead 60,000 Indian and mestizo auxiliaries dead	1536–1662; 200,000 total dead

The Arauco War was a long-running conflict between colonial Spaniards and the Mapuche people, mostly fought in the Araucanía region of Chile. The conflict began at first as a reaction by the Mapuche to the Spanish conquerors attempting to establish cities and force the natives into servitude. It subsequently evolved over time into phases comprising drawn-out sieges, slave-hunting expeditions, pillaging raids, punitive expeditions, and renewed Spanish attempts to secure lost territories. Abduction of women and war rape was common on both sides.

The Spaniards penetrated into Mapuche territory during the conquest of Chile in the 16th century. They were stopped at the Battle of Curalaba in 1598 and the destruction of the Seven Cities. Afterward the two forces established a clear frontier between the Spanish domains and the land of the independent Mapuche. From the 17th to the late 18th century the Mapuche lonkos and Spanish royal governors held a series of parliaments. The war devolved to sporadic pillaging carried out by both sides.

In the words of Philip II, this conflict cost the largest number of Spanish lives in the New World. It became known as the Flandes indiano ("Indian Flanders"), in reference to the Eighty Years' War in Europe.

== Causes of its origin and length ==
Initially, the key area of conflict that the Spanish attempted to secure south of Bío Bío River were the valleys around Cordillera de Nahuelbuta. The Spanish designs for this region was to exploit the placer deposits of gold using Mapuche (slave) labor from the densely populated nearby valleys. To serve the Spanish in gold mining was a deadly activity that killed many Mapuches. Lacking a tradition of forced labor like the Andean mita, the Mapuches largely refused to serve the Spanish, setting the stage for the conflict. It has been conjectured that gold mining was already occurring in Mapuche lands south of the Inca Empire prior to the Spanish arrival and that this would have allowed the Spanish to rapidly identify places with gold.

On the other hand, the Spanish, in particular those from Castile and Extremadura, came from an extremely violent society. According to Diego de Rosales, 17th-century Mapuche chief Lientur would have explained that he preferred to "die warring, than in a bad peace". Analysing the situation in the 1650s, the Real Audiencia of Santiago opined that slavery of Mapuches was one of the reasons for constant state of war between the Spanish and the Mapuches.

Jesuits sought to diminish hostilities and end the war altogether by converting Mapuches to the Christian faith. They temporarily succeeded in enforcing the Defensive War (1612–1626) policy, but their conversion attempts foundered on Mapuche leaders' staunch defense of polygamy, which was unacceptable in the Catholic faith. This insistence on polygamy has been explained as Mapuche chiefs valuing it as a way to establish more alliances through marriage than monogamous marriage allows. Polygamy may also have been valued as important population strategy in war times when the Mapuche male population was unstable.

== Spanish conquest ==
An antecedent of the Arauco War was the Battle of Reynogüelén, which occurred in 1536 between a detachment of Diego de Almagro's expedition and a large group of Mapuches, near the confluence of the Ñuble and Itata rivers. The beginning of the war comes with the campaigns of conquest of Pedro de Valdivia.

=== Campaigns of Pedro de Valdivia (1540–1553) ===
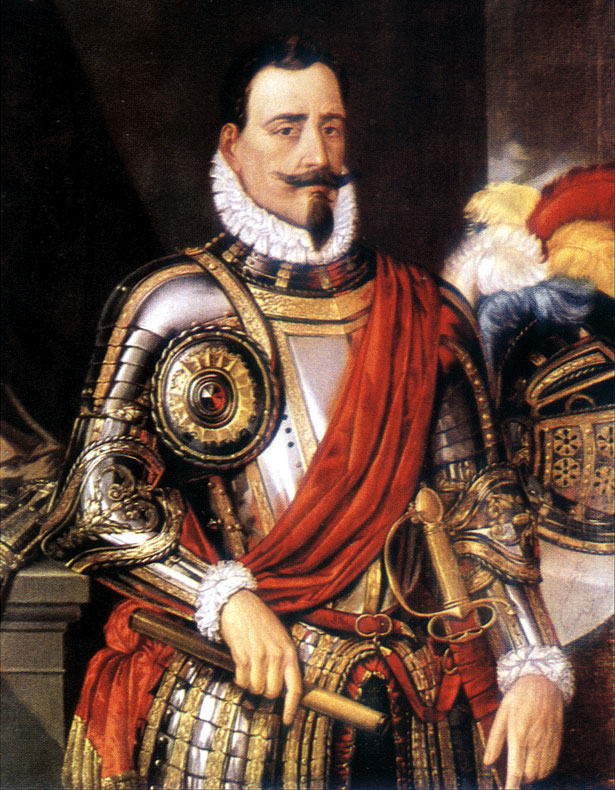
Pedro de Valdivia

During the early phase of the Conquest of Chile, the Spanish conquistador Pedro de Valdivia conducted a nine-year campaign to secure central Chile. Arriving in central Chile, Pedro de Valdivia was confronted by the toqui Michimalonco, who a couple of years before had expelled the Incas from the northern parts of the Mapuche lands. The Spanish and Mapuche faced each other in the Battle of Mapocho, in which de Valdivia was victorious. Michimalonco decided to make a tactical retreat to gather more contingents and to expel the Spanish invaders with a surprise attack, but the Spanish learnt of this and decided to head for where the Mapuche were gathering: at the Battle of Chillox, Michimalonco was defeated again.

The resounding victory left Pedro de Valdivia confident enough to decide to found the city of Santiago in the Mapocho valley and begin organizing the nascent colony. After a few months of settlement, Pedro de Valdivia gathered his forces and went directly to attack the fortress of Michimalonco in Paidahuén, leading to the battle of Paidahuén where the Mapuches were completely defeated and Michimalonco taken prisoner. To obtain his freedom, Michimalonco offered the Spanish the ownership of the Marga Marga gold pans, which had belonged to Michimalonco since the expulsion of the Incas. With this, Michimalonco and his imprisoned men were released and Michimalonco set some of his vassals to the exploitation of the gold on behalf of the Spanish.

After gold-panning for the Spanish for a while, Trangolonco, Michimalonco's brother, revolted. He defeated the Spaniards in Marga Marga, destroying the Spanish settlement, then defeated the Spanish in Concón, burning a ship under construction in the bay: only one Spaniard and a slave escaped. Trangolonco called on all the indigenous chiefs of the Cachapoal, Maipo and Mapocho valleys to send forces to join Michimalonco so that, just as he did with the Incas, he might expel the Spanish from the Wallmapu. In this way, he managed to gather around 16,000 warriors.

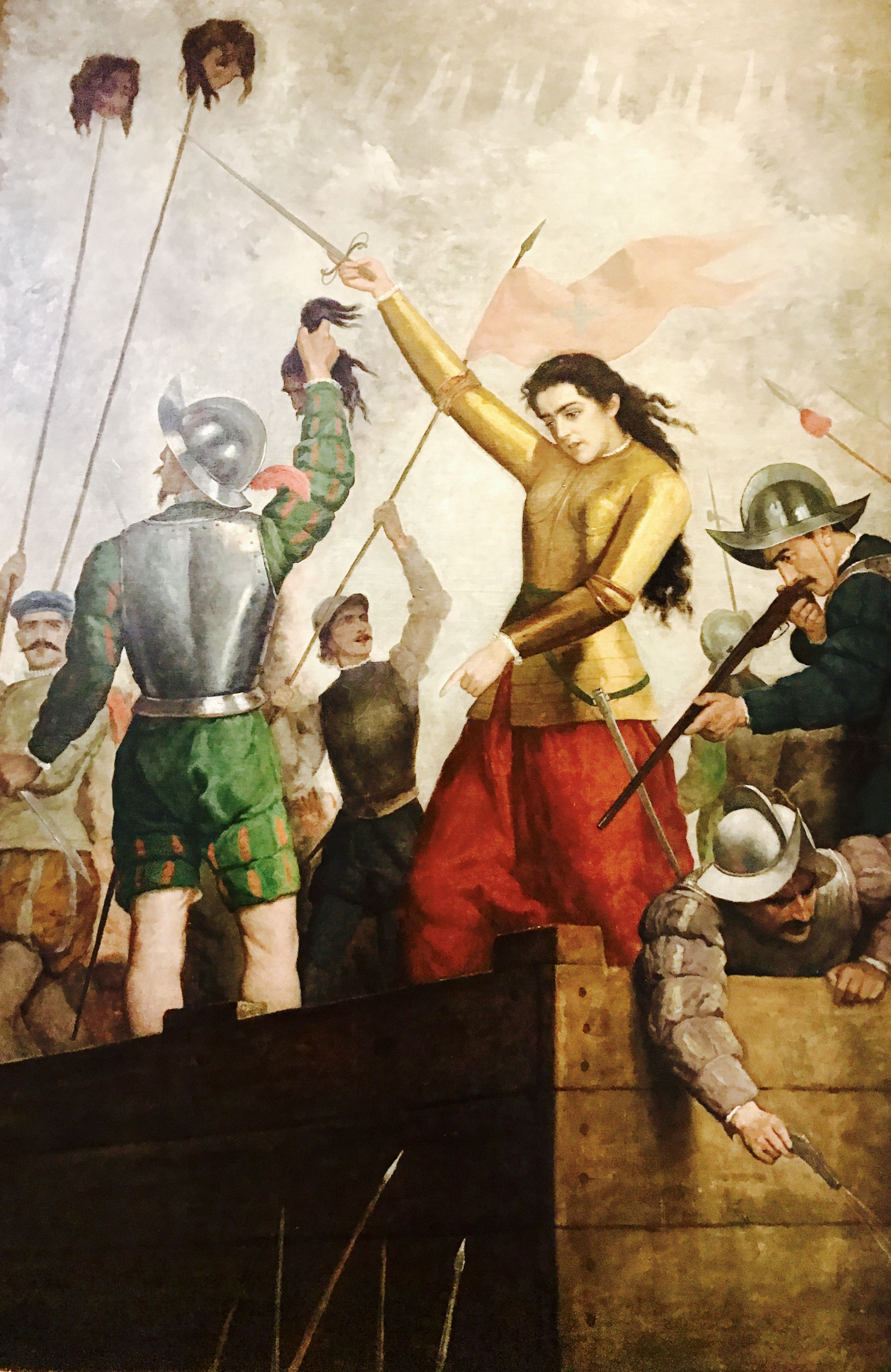
Doña Inés de Suárez in defending the city of Santiago

On September 11, 1541, Michimalonco attacked: the resulting Destruction of Santiago left barely a handful of Spaniards surviving. Then Michimalonco applied his “empty war” strategy, which consisted of not giving the Spaniards any type of food or supplies to force them to go back to Peru. The Spanish barely managed to resist and there were a series of skirmishes between Spanish and Mapuche forces.

After a large number of confrontations between the forces of de Valdivia and those of Michimalonco, the capture by de Valdivia of three forts held by Michimalonco in the Andean mountain range of the Aconcagua River, enabled the Spanish finally to gain control over the valleys of Cachapoal, Maipo and Aconcagua by the end of 1543; resulting in the withdrawal of Michimalonco's forces towards the north.

In 1544, Michimalonco headed to the Limarí River valley to cut off Spanish land communications between Chile and Peru. With the forces of his Diaguita allies in this region added to his own, Michimalonco regained his strength, winning some victories against the Spanish advances, and forcing Pedro de Valdivia into commanding his army himself; engaging the Mapuche-Diaguita forces at the battle of Limarí, where Michimalonco was again defeated.

Pedro de Valdivia then sent Juan Bohón to found the City of La Serena at the mouth of the Elqui River.

In 1544, de Valdivia sent out a naval expedition, comprising the barques San Pedro and Santiaguillo, under the command of Juan Bautista Pastene, to reconnoitre the southwestern coast of South America as far as the Strait of Magellan. The expedition set sail from Valparaíso, entered the bay of San Pedro, and made landings at what is now known as Concepción and at Valdivia, which was later named in honour of the commander. Encountering severe storms further south, he then returned to Valparaiso.

Pedro de Valdivia himself set out in 1546, with sixty horsemen plus guides and porters. Crossing the Itata River, he was attacked by Mapuche warriors in the Battle of Quilacura near the Bío-Bío River. Realizing that it would be impossible to proceed in such hostile territory with so limited a force, de Valdivia elected to return to Santiago after finding a site for a new city at what is now Penco and that would become the first site of Concepción.

=== Founding of Concepción, Imperial, and Valdivia ===
In 1550, a new expedition was launched, consisting of a naval force under Pastene, and a land force of two hundred Spaniards mounted and foot and a number of Mapocho auxiliaries under de Valdivia. They planned to reunite on the shores of the Bay of Concepción. The expedition advanced beyond the Itata River and Laja River, to the shores of the Bío-Bío River. Along the way they had several battles with groups of Mapuches as they explored the region, killing many with little loss to themselves. After spending over a week in the area and encountering increasing opposition, the Spanish marched toward the sea through the valleys of the Laja and Bío-Bío rivers, towards the coast at Penco. On the banks of the Andalién River, they camped for two days between the river and a lake, where they were attacked on the second night by a large force of Araucanians under their toqui Ainavillo in the Battle of Andalien. The night attack was defeated in a furious battle, the Spaniards suffered one killed and many wounds to men and especially their mounts. After a day treating their wounds they continued towards their rendezvous at the Bay of Concepción. There de Valdivia began building a fort at what is now Penco.

On February 23, Pastene's fleet anchored in the bay, brought supplies and reinforcements, and provided materials to finish the fort. On March 1 de Valdivia founded here the city of Concepción del Nuevo Extremo. On March 3 of that year, the fort was completed and was attacked nine days later by the largest force of Mapuches yet seen in the Battle of Penco. This force was broken and routed despite the small size of the Spanish forces. Despite the resulting submission of the local tribes, de Valdivia sent an emissary to the Viceroy of Peru, asking for additional forces; he knew that it would not be possible to complete the conquest of Araucanía with only the forces at his disposal. After reinforcement at Concepción in 1551, he organized another expedition to establish the fort La Imperial on the banks of the Imperial River. He then returned to Concepción to prepare another expedition and await the reinforcements the Viceroy had promised to send by sea.

Leaving orders that the new troops should disembark on the Tierras de Valdivia that Pastene had discovered earlier, de Valdivia left with two hundred soldiers in the direction of Fort Imperial. Once he had passed it on his way south, he ordered Jerónimo de Alderete to drive inland and establish a fort, with the goal of securing his eastern flank. To this end, Alderente reached Lake Villarrica and established a fort there. Meanwhile, de Valdivia's column advanced southwards and joined the reinforcements sent from Peru, under the command of Francisco de Villagra. There, the city of Santa María la Blanca de Valdivia was established. After garrisoning these new places, de Valdivia returned to his base at Concepción in 1552 where rich placer gold mines were found in the Quilacoya River valley.

== First Great Mapuche Rebellion (1553) ==
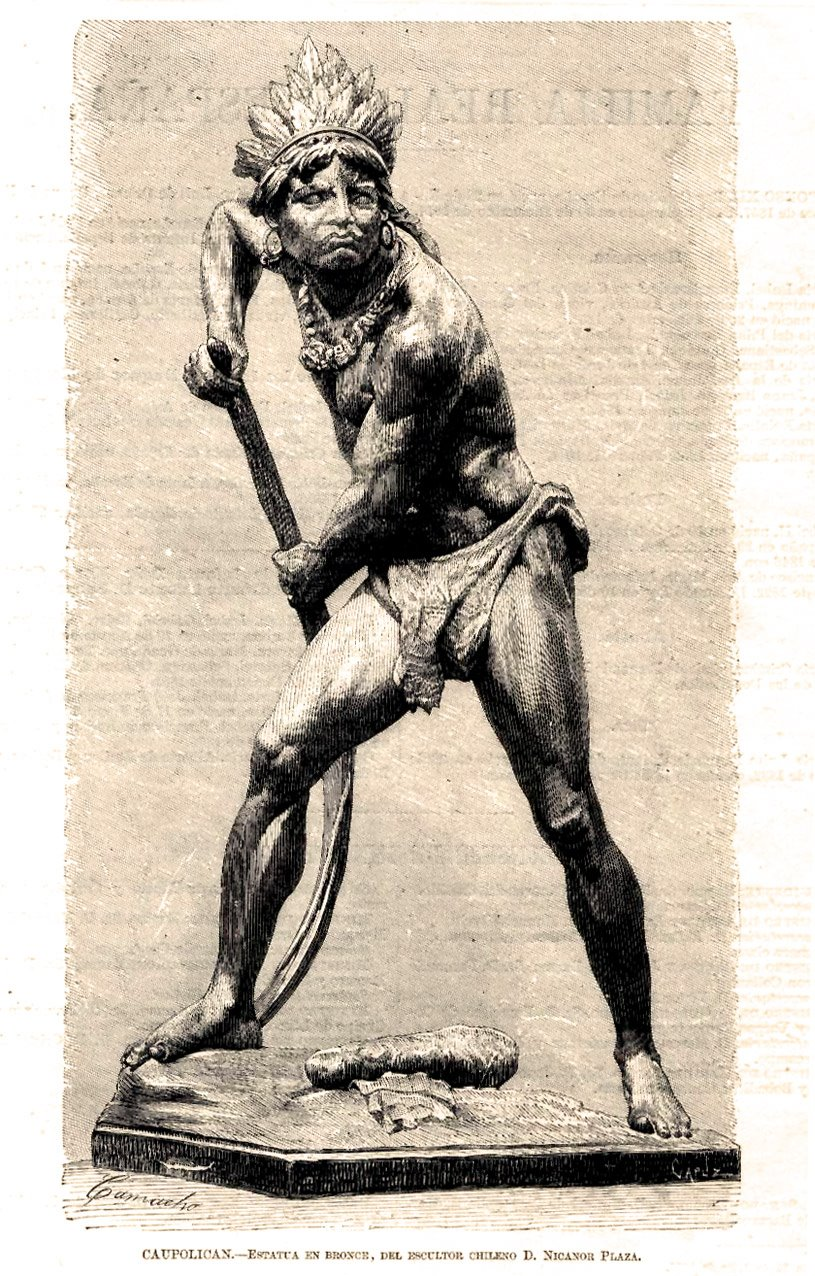
Caupolican by Nicanor Plaza

=== Lautaro and the Battle of Tucapel ===
With the goal of securing the lines of communication with the southern forts, de Valdivia launched a third expedition which established forts at Tucapel, Purén, Confines, and Arauco. The Araucanians didn't offer any resistance to the conquistadors in their fort-building. In October 1553, the Quilacoya gold mine was opened and large numbers of Mapuche were forced to work in it.

In 1553, the Mapuches held a council at which, because of the growth of Spanish forces in their territory, they resolved to make war. They chose as their "toqui" (wartime chief) an extraordinarily strong man called Caupolicán and as his vice toqui Lautaro, because he had served as an auxiliary to the Spanish cavalry; his experiences with the Spanish gave him insight into the best methods for fighting the conquistadores. He created the first Mapuche cavalry corps.

With six thousand warriors under his command, Lautaro attacked the fort at Tucapel. The Spanish garrison was unable to withstand the assault and retreated to Purén. Lautaro seized and burned the fort and prepared his army certain that the Spaniards would attempt to retake Tucapel. De Valdivia, with a reduced force, mounted a counter-attack, but he was quickly surrounded and his army was massacred by the Mapuches in the Battle of Tucapel. This was Pedro de Valdivia's last battle; he was captured and later killed in captivity when he refused to concede defeat.

=== Campaigns of Caupolicán and Lautaro (1554–1557) ===
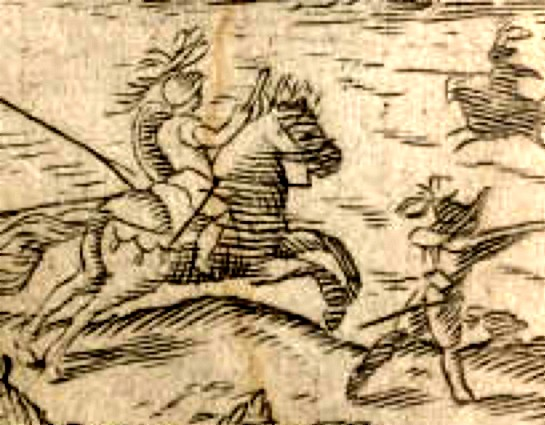
Picture from Alonso de Ovalle's Historia de Chile

After the defeat at Tucapel, the Spanish hurriedly reorganized their forces, reinforcing fort Imperial for its defence and abandoning Confines and Arauco in order to strengthen Concepción. However, Araucanian tradition dictated a lengthy victory celebration, which kept Lautaro from exploiting the weakness of the Spanish position as he desired. It was only in February 1554 that he succeeded in putting together an army of 8,000 men, just in time to confront a punitive expedition under the command of Francisco de Villagra at the Battle of Marihueñu.

Despite this new victory, Lautaro was again unable to pursue the opportunity due to the celebrations and beliefs of his people. By the time he arrived at Concepción, it was already abandoned. After burning it, he could not continue the offensive with his remaining forces, and the campaign came to an end as the warriors demobilized.

In Santiago, Villagra reorganized his forces, and that same year of 1554, he departed again for Arauco and reinforced the strongholds of Imperial and Valdivia, which allowed the garrisons and their Indian friends to make many raids on the surrounding Mapuche settlements, burning houses and fields and killing all they found. Resulting devastation produced a famine and an epidemic among the hostile Mapuche around those cities. Meanwhile, in the north during 1554, news of the victories of Lautauro led to uprisings by the previously subdued Promaucaes in the valley of the Mataquito River and the Picunche in the valley of the Aconcagua River, but these were put down.

In 1555, the Real Audiencia in Lima ordered Villagra to reconstruct Concepción, which was accomplished by Capitan Alvarado and 75 colonists. When he learned that it was being rebuilt, Lautaro again attacked Concepción with 4,000 warriors. Alvarado attempted to defeat Lautaro's army outside the city, but failed and fled to the city pursued by Lautaro's army. Only 38 Spaniards managed to escape by sea from this second destruction of the city. Following this victory in 1556, the Promauces sent a message to the Mapuche of Arauco promising food to support their army and warriors to join it in a war against the Spanish in Santiago.

=== Lautaro's campaigns against Santiago ===
After his victories in the south and the messages promising support from the north, Lautaro planned an assault on Santiago. With the ravages of the recent epidemic and the needs of the campaign against the Spanish still occupying cities within Mapuche territory still going on, he was not able to draw many troops from the main Mapuche army for his campaign to the north. He had to rely on recruiting warriors among the people north of the Bio Bio River among subjugated Mapuche and the Promaucaes north of the Itata River, who were now inspired by the previous successes of Lautaro to revolt again.

But when he entered the places subject to Santiago, he began taking reprisals against the Promaucaes who refused to join him, doing great damage and depopulating the land. The refugees fled to the city for aid and protection. In October 1556 he reached the Mataquito River in his northward march. There he built a fortified camp near Teno in a place called Peteroa as a base of operations against Santiago. Lautaro ambushed a first probe by a small Spanish force from Santiago. A larger force under Pedro de Villagra later attacked the fortress at Peteroa over several days but were not able to take it and were forced away by flooding. However, with unfavourable losses and more Spaniards coming to de Villagra's support, Lautaro retreated towards the Maule River hoping to establish himself there. However, the Spanish cavalry of Juan Godíñez pursued to the Maule River, cutting down stragglers and one of Lautaro's detachments was cut to pieces. Lautaro's army gave them the slip, but was forced to fall back beyond the Itata River. Captain Godiñez returned victorious from this pursuit and put great fear into the Promaucaes by punishing them with destruction of their herds, fields, and houses and by cutting off some heads, as a lesson not to call upon the Mapuche army or give aid to them.

In January 1557, Francisco de Villagra advanced southward to aid the remaining cities against the Mapuche army led by Caupolicán. Informed by his allies that the city of Santiago was now relatively unprotected, Lautaro evaded de Villagra, letting him pass to the south while he marched again toward Santiago with a new army including allies under Panigualgo. However Lautaro's mistreatment of the intimidated local Indians to extract provisions had created dissension among his allies. His allies separated from him after the army reached the Mataquito River at Lora, after a dispute over his actions with an allied leader named Chillan who accused Lautaro of acting like the Spaniards. He moved his remaining army over a league up river and again established a fortified camp on the Mataquito River amid a carrizal at the foot of a wooded hill. However, its location was betrayed to Francisco de Villagra by local Indians previously abused by Lautaro. De Villagra sent word to Juan Godíñez near Santiago to meet him as he hurried north. The Spanish forces met without Lautaro being alerted and made a surprise night march over the hills of Caune, to the hill overlooking Lautaro's camp, on the shore of the Mataquito River. On April 29, at dawn de Villagra began the Battle of Mataquito with a surprise attack on the camp in which they killed Lautaro and obtained a decisive victory, destroying his army and dispersing his allies.

=== Campaigns of Caupolicán and García Hurtado de Mendoza ===
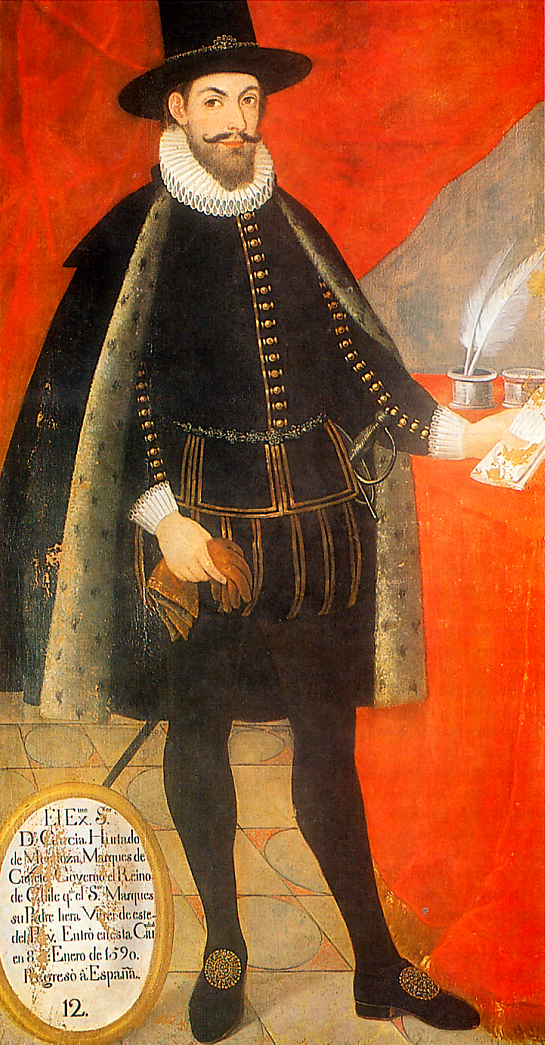
García Hurtado de Mendoza, 5th Marquis of Cañete

After the death of Jerónimo de Alderete in Panama while returning to Chile, García Hurtado de Mendoza was designated the interim governor of Chile in 1557, and immediately sailed south from Peru, this time with a much stronger force than before: 600 soldiers, 6 pieces of artillery, and 1,000 horses. He landed in La Serena and had the rival contenders for the governorship, Francisco de Villagra and Francisco de Aguirre arrested and sent to Peru and put his own men in control of the province. Sending his cavalry by land he sailed south in winter and landed in early June 1557 on the island of La Quiriquina at the mouth of the Bay of Concepción. He ordered a party to land at Penco and reconstruct the fort of Concepción. A Mapuche army attempted to raze the fort but were defeated by artillery and gunfire. After his cavalry and horses arrived overland from Santiago, Mendoza began his advance to the south of the Bio-Bio and another Mapuche army including Galvarino attempted to stop them in the open field in the Battle of Lagunillas, but again were defeated after hard fighting, and as a result their fortress at Andalicán, the gateway to Arauco, was left undefended and was captured soon after the battle.

Caupolicán led the Mapuche unsuccessfully resisting the advance of Hurtado de Mendoza by attacking him from ambush in the Battle of Millarapue. After further fighting near the site of the ruined fortress of Tucapel, Mendoza built the fort and city of Cañete de la Frontera and continued to the south. There he established the city of Osorno and explored southward to the Gulf of Ancud. Attempting to throw off the Spanish occupation, Caupolicán attacked the fort of Cañete expecting the gates to be opened by the treachery of a yanakuna within, but he was betrayed instead and was badly defeated by Captain Alonso de Reinoso. Although he was able to escape immediately after this last battle when Spanish cavalry did not arrive in time to pursue, he was eventually betrayed and captured in the mountains by Pedro de Avendaño, sentenced to death by Alonso de Reinoso, and executed by impalement in Cañete.

After the death of Caupolicán, García Hurtado de Mendoza thought that they had subjugated the Mapuche. On the contrary, the manner of the death of Caupolicán inspired the Mapuches to continue the struggle with a guerrilla war in which there was no day that some yanaconas or once in a while some encomendero did not die at the hands of Mapuches. When the number of missing or dead reached 400 yanaconas and 10 Spaniards, the governor was convinced that he had been mistaken. In Quiapo, the Mapuches under their new toqui, Caupolicán the younger, constructed a fort that was to stop the forces of Mendoza from marching into Arauco and rebuilding a fort there. Mendoza advanced from Cañete and crushed another Mapuche army at the Battle of Quiapo. After the battle, Hurtado de Mendoza had most of the captured Mapuche executed, but saved Peteguelén, son of Cuyomanque, an important cacique in the Arauco region. Through his help and that of the grateful father, he was able to contact and bring most of the leaders of Arauco and Tucapel to submit to Spanish rule following the reconstruction of the fort in Arauco. Mendoza also founded the city of San Andrés de Angol or Los Infantes not far from the old fort of Confines.

In February 1561, Phillip II relieved García Hurtado de Mendoza, replacing him as governor with the victor over Lautaro, Francisco de Villagra. Mendoza left Chile with the belief that he had overcome the Mapuche. He was one of the few governors who obtained a certain degree of success in the War. This success was due to the large numbers of experienced soldiers, equipment, and arms that he brought which were not available to the previous conquerors and because the Mapuche did not have a strategist to equal Lautaro.

The Mapuches pretended peace, but secretly continued to prepare for a new revolt. Soon after the defeat at Quiapo, the surviving leaders gathered and elected Illangulién as the new toqui. With most of the nations' warriors dead or wounded and the population decimated by the effects of war, starvation, and disease, he decided to retreat into the marshes of Lumaco and there gather their strength and train a new generation of warriors for a future revolt. The Mapuche had learned to work iron, use Spanish weapons (including firearms and cannon), ride horses captured from their conquerors, and learned better strategies and tactics. The defeats inflicted by Mendoza had made the Mapuche a united people and one committed to renewing the war against the Spanish to secure independence.

== Second Great Mapuche Rebellion (1561) ==
=== Campaigns of Francisco de Villagra ===
Hostilities resumed with the arrival of Francisco de Villagra to replace Mendoza. It began during the brief interim governorship of Rodrigo de Quiroga with the killing of the hated encomendero and corregidor of Cañete Pedro de Avendaño and two other Spaniards in July 1561 in the valley of Puren. Spanish punitive expeditions from Angol and La Imperial drove the insurgents into the refuge of the Lumaco marshes. However, the news of the killing was spread by the Mapuches and it initiated a new general rising greater than the previous ones. With Villagra's arrival also came its first smallpox epidemic that ravaged the native population of Chile.

The toqui of the Arauco region, Millalelmo, with a local army laid siege to Arauco from May 20 to June 30, 1562. At the end of 1562, the Mapuches under a leader named Meuco, had fortified a pucará in the province of Mareguano, three leagues from the city of Los Infantes. Arias Pardo Maldonado destroyed the pucará but he did not gain a complete victory, since most of the Mapuches escaped. Elsewhere the corregidor of Cañete Juan Lazarte was killed at the gates of Cañete trying to recapture mounts stolen by thirty mapuches.

The Mapuches reconstructed the pucará near Los Infantes in January 1563, but Pedro de Villagra was sent again to destroy it. Once again the Mapuche rebuilt it, but this time with sections readily accessible to the cavalry. Despite suspicions of veteran Spaniards they attacked the location, and many fell into well-disguised pits. There the governor's son, Pedro de Villagra "el Mozo", and forty two other Spaniards died. This disastrous military defeat forced governor Francisco de Villagra to order the city of Cañete to be abandoned. News of the abandonment of Cañete spread the revolt.

When Francisco de Villagra heard the news of his son's death he became ill and left for Concepcion leaving his cousin, Pedro de Villagra, in charge of the campaign. The Mapuches, now under Colocolo, attacked on two fronts against the forts of Los Infantes and Arauco investing them, but were unable to take them. Again Petegüelen offered peace to the Spaniards and Villagra accepted, but this peace was deceptive since the Mapuches needed to harvest their fields.

In April 1563, the Mapuche reestablished the siege of Arauco. This lasted 42 days with the Mapuches losing 500 warriors mostly from dysentery contracted from drinking contaminated water. Finally they chose to retire and to raise the siege. Shortly afterward, Francisco de Villagra died in Concepcion on June 22, 1563, leaving his cousin Pedro de Villagra as interim governor.

=== Campaigns of Pedro de Villagra ===
Because he believed he had too few men to hold all the posts in Mapuche territory and still have a field army, the new governor Pedro de Villagra ordered the abandonment of Arauco in July 1563, taking off its artillery and noncombatants by sea while the garrison under Lorenzo Bernal del Mercado marched over the rain soaked mountains and flooded rivers to Angol. The Mapuche destroyed the fort shortly after the garrison left and harassed their march. Regarding the abandonment of Arauco as a victory, it inspired the Mapuche north of the Bío-Bío River to revolt.

In 1564, Pedro de Villagra took measures to protect all the towns and forts he still held and gathered a field army in Concepción drawn from all these posts. He knew that one of the Mapuche objectives was to surround Concepcion and preparations were made to support a long siege. After a brief fight Loble defeated the troops of captain Francisco de Vaca in the Itata River valley who were coming with reinforcements from Santiago. In addition, Millalelmo ambushed Spanish reinforcements coming from Angol to the south under captain Juan Perez de Zurita, at a crossing of the Andalién River. Both defeats cut off the city and garrison of Concepción from outside aid by land. The defeated survivors had to retreat to Santiago and were in no condition to break through the investment around Concepción. On the other hand, encouraged by these victories in the north, Illangulién resolved to destroy Los Infantes before marching to Concepción.

At Los Infantes the Mapuche blockade grew tighter as they moved closer and closer to the city, protected in their well-sited pucarás. Its commander, Lorenzo Bernal del Mercado, judged them too well-defended to attack until they started to build their third pucara close to the city. Then in the Battle of Angol, Lorenzo Bernal drove the Mapuche army out of their pucara and pursued them down to the river and pushed them back into it, killing Illangulién and a thousand of his men, with many others wounded or captured and the rest of the army dispersed. Afterward Paillataru was elected as Toqui.

Meanwhile, the caciques Millalelmu and Loble with 20,000 warriors from the area between the Itata and Bío-Bío rivers, settled down to the Siege of Concepción in February 1564. The Mapuche entered the city, sacking and burning it, crowding all its population within the walls of its fortress with its garrison under Pedro de Villagra. The siege lasted around two months until at the end of March two ships arrived and brought food that would permit the siege to continue for a much longer time. On the other side the Mapuche had used up local sources of food and were finding it difficult to maintain their large force. With the harvest season coming and with the news of their defeat in the Battle of Angol, they were nervous that their families might starve or their undefended homes might be attacked from Angol or Santiago. They raised their siege on April 1, and dispersed to their homes for the winter.

After the siege was raised, Villagra became aware of an effort to replace him as governor by Martin Ruiz de Gamboa, son-in-law of Rodrigo de Quiroga. Villagra tried to arrest Gamboa who fled overland to Santiago, but Villagra sailed to Valparaíso in a few days with some of his men and arrested him in Santiago when he arrived. Villagra then tried to reorganize the surviving disheartened troops of Vaca and Zurita in Santiago and take them south in October 1564. But he was delayed much longer, spending heavily from the impoverished provincial treasury and contributions exacted from the cities of Chile with difficulty. He slowly refitted and enlarged his army over the winter and spring.

Villagra left the city in mid-January 1565, with 110 Spaniards and gathered 800 Indian auxiliaries from their repartimientos as he marched south to the Maule River. There he linked up with 30 Spaniards under Pedro Hernández de Córdova who were observing the frontier with the Mapuche after the Mapuche had blocked their prior attempt to reinforce Concepción. During the seven months Villagra was in Santiago, the Mapuche north of the Bío-Bío had built a strong pucara on the Perquilauquén River, blocking the road south to Concepción and in the Second Battle of Reinohuelén Villagra rapidly took it and destroyed the Mapuche army holding it. Soon afterward Villagra ambushed Loble as he was bringing reinforcements, and unaware of the defeat he was surprised, defeated, and captured. Subsequently, Villagra established fort San Ildefonso in the region and was able to suppress the Mapuche revolt north of the Bio-Bio.

=== War during the rule of the Real Audiencia of Chile ===
Shortly after the end of the campaign Pedro de Villagra was replaced at the order of the Viceroy of Peru by Rodrigo de Quiroga as the temporary governor in 1565. Quiroga launched a new campaign, organized by Lorenzo Bernal del Mercado, who reconstructed Cañete, and repopulated Arauco in 1566. He accomplished the conquest of the island of Chiloé, sending Martín Ruiz de Gamboa to establish the city of Castro there, and pacify its inhabitants, the Cuncos. Quiroga returned to find he was to be replaced by the Real Audiencia of Concepción in August 1567. In September 1567, the king named Melchor Bravo de Saravia y Sotomayor to take over the civil and military government of Chile, with the title of governor and he arrived from Lima in 1568.

== Campaigns between 1568 and 1598 ==
=== Campaigns during the governorship of Melchor Bravo de Saravia ===
Governor Melchor Bravo de Saravia y Sotomayor arrived from Lima in 1568 and recruited 100 new soldiers and gathered food in Santiago province and marched south to join the army near the mouth of the Tavolevo River in Catirai.

Toqui Llanganabal

Battle of Catirai

1570 Concepción earthquake

Pailacar

Battle of Purén

Toqui Paineñamcu or Alonso Diaz

=== Campaigns of Rodrigo de Quiroga and Martín Ruiz de Gamboa ===
Governor Rodrigo de Quiroga

1575 Valdivia earthquake

Juan de Lebú

Governor Martín Ruiz de Gamboa

Tasa de Gamboa

=== Campaigns of Alonso de Sotomayor ===
Governor Alonso de Sotomayor arrived in Chile in 1583 and had to judge accusations against his predecessor, who had become extremely unpopular for the Tasa de Gamboa which had prohibited the payment of taxes by the Indians in the form of labor. Sotomayor later absolved Gamboa entirely but abolished the Tasa de Gamboa and reinstituted the Tasa de Santillán, with new provisions to humanize the old system, in an attempt to avoid the excesses of the encomenderos against the Indians.

Despite his early successful campaign when he captured Alonso Diaz in 1584, he wanted to extend the conquest of Chile by building a series of forts which would protect each other, the cities, and their surrounding lands. They were also to hem in the Moluche and become the secure bases of future campaigns. In 1584, Sotomayor founded the fort of San Fabián de Conueo in Coelemu securing communications between Santiago and Concepcion. In 1585 he ordered the construction of forts around Catirai, Santo Arbol de la Cruz where the Guaqui River enters the Bio Bio River, Espíritu Santo near the mouth of the Tavolevo River with Santísima Trinidad directly across the Bio Bio River, and in the upper reaches of the Culenco River, fort San Jerónimo de Millapoa. In Purén he also raised another fort, where he placed a small garrison.

Opposing these moves by Sotomayor was the Toqui Cayancaru who attempted a siege of the fort at Arauco that failed, leading to his abdication of his office in favour of his son Nangoniel in 1585. Nangoniel returned to invest Arauco again, his cavalry (operating with the army for the first time) prevented the Spaniards from supplying the fort and they were forced to evacuate it. He next moved against the Santísima Trinidad but clashed with a division of Spanish troops under Francisco Hernandez, where he was wounded and soon hunted down and killed. Cadeguala was proclaimed Toqui in his place the same day and began operations against Angol, breaking into the city, however he was repulsed by a counterattack. He followed this with a siege of Purén the following year. He drove off a relief force with his cavalry and offered the garrison terms but was refused. He next challenged the commander of the fort, Alonso García de Ramón, to single combat to decide the fate of the fortress. The two leaders fought on horseback with lances, and Cadeguala fell, killed by his opponent. His army raised the siege, but after electing Guanoalca as toqui returned to successfully drive the poorly supplied Spanish from Purén and burned it in 1586.

Putaén

Janequeo

Fort Livén

Meanwhile, Sotomayor had the distraction of an attack by English pirates under Thomas Cavendish. When they anchored in Quintero on April 9, 1587, he was defeated by the Spanish, losing 10 men and continued up the coast of South America.

Sotomayor rebuilt Purén in 1589 and built a new fort on the heights of Marihueñu. Guanoalca directed his army against the new Spanish fort, but finding it too strongly held, diverted his attacks against Espíritu Santo and the fort of Santísima Trinidad on the opposite shore of the Bio Bio River.

Toqui Quintuguenu

Toqui Paillaeco

Toqui Paillamachu

Governor Pedro de Viscarra

== Third Great Mapuche Rebellion (1598) ==
=== Campaigns of Martín García Óñez de Loyola ===
In September 1592, Martín García Óñez de Loyola, famous for his capture of Túpac Amaru, was appointed as Captain General directly by Philip II, who thought him the most likely candidate to finish the Arauco War. Loyola insisted in penetrating Mapuche territory with an army of soldiers coming directly from Panama. He established fort Santa Cruz de Oñez on the Rele River near the confluence of the Bio-Bio and Laja Rivers in May 1594. The fort was elevated to the rank of city in 1595 giving it the name of Santa Cruz de Coya. Later, on December 21, 1598, Oñez de Loyola became the second governor of Chile to die in war with the Mapuches, surprised by Pelantaro in the Disaster of Curalaba.

=== Mapuche Uprising of 1598 ===
The Disaster of Curalaba became the beginning of a general uprising that resulted in a six-year struggle called the Destruction of the Seven Cities that eliminated all Spanish settlements south of the Bio-Bio River with the exception of those in Chiloé Archipelago. The viceroy of Peru hastily appointed Francisco de Quiñónez as replacement for the deceased Loyola. He was an experienced military man with great prudence but with little aptitude for the crisis that he was called upon to face. This governor discovered the terrible state of the colony and asked urgently for reinforcements. Meanwhile, he tried to support those places that were possible to defend. Nevertheless, things were soon out of his control despite everything done to stabilize the situation, and he sickened and asked for his relief.

Over the next few years, the Mapuche were able to destroy or force the abandonment of many cities and minor settlements including all the seven Spanish cities in Mapuche territory south of the Bio Bio River: Santa Cruz de Coya (1599), Santa María la Blanca de Valdivia (1599), San Andrés de Los Infantes (1599), La Imperial (1600), Santa María Magdalena de Villa Rica (1602), San Mateo de Osorno (1603), and San Felipe de Araucan (1604).

== Mapuche uprising of 1655 ==
The last major uprising came on February 14, 1655, when Mapuche forces under Clentaru rose up against the Spaniards and pushed back the forces of governor Francisco Antonio de Acuña Cabrera y Bayona. The insurrection was a reaction against enslavement of the indigenous and caused an exodus of Spanish from areas south of the Maule River. After that, the Spanish tactics varied from a "defensive war" proposed by Jesuit missionaries, and parliaments with loncos to make agreements with the Mapuche in so called parliaments. This allowed the growth of commerce and increased the mestization.

The Mapuche uprising in 1655 was a series of uprisings by the Mapuche people against the Spanish in which the Mapuche people target forts in the Spanish controlled area in what is present day Galletué Lake. The uprising was in large part due to retaliation to the parliament of Boroa from 1651 which included a ban on Mapuche to carry weapons unless they were given permission by the Spanish. In 1608 Spain decided to repeal its ban on the slavery of indigenous people that was in effect from 1598 since the last rebellion and the Destruction of the Seven Cities. This repeal only applied to Mapuche who rebelled and was supported by the church under their rules at the time. However, this only made Mapuche slavery legal as it had already been happening, and now they began to be bought and sold among the Spanish.

== 18th century ==
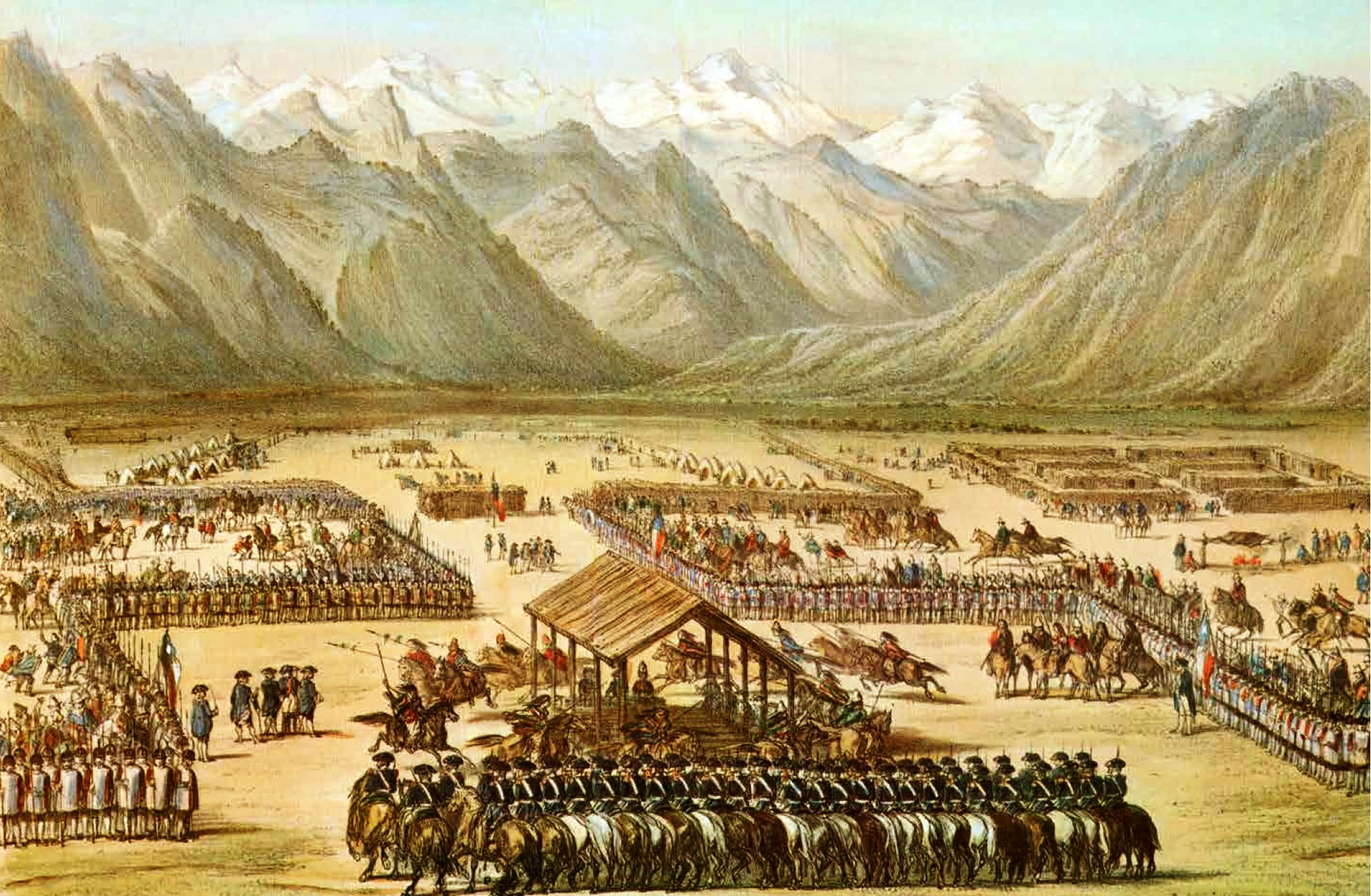
The 1793 parliament of Negrete

Mapuche uprising of 1723.

== Post-colonial period ==
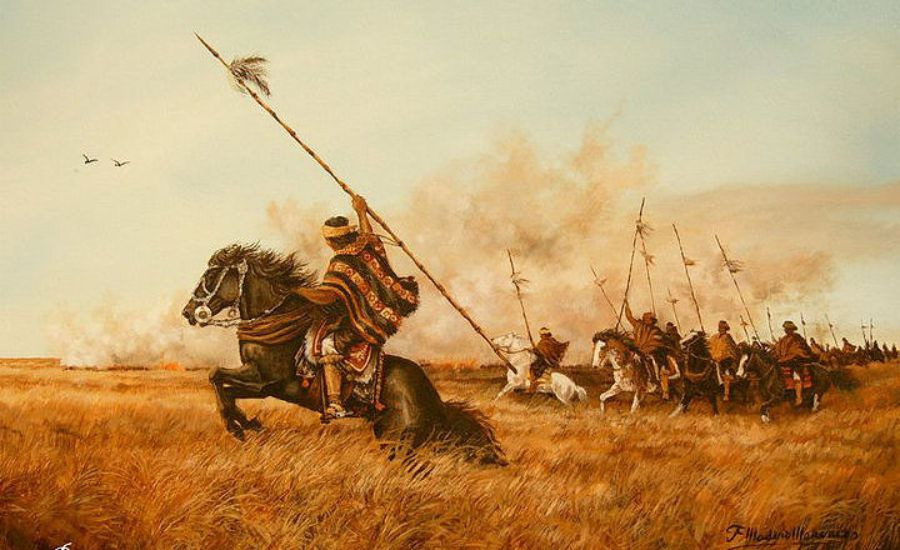
Mapuche war party led by Calfucurá

Camino de los chilenos were a group of routes in Patagonia used by Mapuches and related araucanized tribes to head cattle stolen during malones from Argentina to Chile across the Andes. In 1872, the Mapuche leader Calfucurá and his 6,000 warriors attacked several cities in Argentina. These events were a catalyst for the government to mount the Conquest of the Desert.

== See also ==
- Araucanization of Patagonia
- Chichimeca War
- Coastal defence of colonial Chile

== Bibliography ==
- Barros Arana, Diego (1884–1902). Historia Jeneral de Chile (in Spanish). Vol. I–XVI. Santiago, Chile: Rafael Jover. ISBN 9780598482358.
- Bengoa, José (2003). Historia de los antiguos mapuches del sur (in Spanish). Santiago: Catalonia. ISBN 978-956-8303-02-0.
- Carvallo y Goyeneche, Vicente (1875). Miguel Luis Amunategui (ed.). Descripción Histórica y Geografía del Reino de Chile Vol. I (1542–1626). Coleccion de historiadores de Chile y documentos relativos a la historia nacional (in Spanish). Vol. VIII (Instituto Chileno de Cultura Hispánica, Academia Chilena de la Historia ed.). Santiago, Chile: Imprenta de La Estrella de Chile.
- Carvallo y Goyeneche, Vicente (1875). Miguel Luis Amunategui (ed.). Descripción Histórica y Geografía del Reino de Chile Vol. II (1626–1787). Coleccion de historiadores de Chile y documentos relativos a la historia nacional (in Spanish). Vol. IX (Instituto Chileno de Cultura Hispánica, Academia Chilena de la Historia ed.). Santiago, Chile: Imprenta de La Estrella de Chile. p. 483.
- Carvallo y Goyeneche, Vicente (1875). Miguel Luis Amunategui (ed.). Descripción Histórica y Geografía del Reino de Chile Vol. III. Coleccion de historiadores de Chile y documentos relativos a la historia nacional (in Spanish). Vol. X (Instituto Chileno de Cultura Hispánica, Academia Chilena de la Historia ed.). Santiago, Chile: Imprenta de La Estrella de Chile.
- Córdoba y Figueroa, Pedro de (1862). Historia de Chile (1492–1717). Coleccion de historiadores de Chile y documentos relativos a la historia nacional (in Spanish). Vol. II (Instituto Chileno de Cultura Hispánica, Academia Chilena de la Historia ed.). Santiago, Chile: Imprenta del Ferrocarril.
- Crow, John A (1992). The Epic of Latin America (4th ed.). New York, NY: University of California Press. pp. 331–333.
- Cruz Farias, Eduardo (2002). "An overview of the Mapuche and Aztec military response to the Spanish Conquest". Archived from the original on September 30, 2008.
- Ercilla, Alonso de. La Araucana (in Spanish). Eswikisource.
- Eyzaguirre, José Ignacio Víctor (1850). Historia eclesiastica: Politica y literaria de Chile (in Spanish). Valparaíso, Chile: Imprenta del Comercio. pp. 205–206.
- Gay, Claudio (1845). Historia física y política de Chile (1564–1638) (in Spanish). Vol. II. Paris, France: En casa del autor.
- Gay, Claudio (1847). Historia física y política de Chile (1638–1716) (in Spanish). Vol. III. Paris, France: En casa del autor.
- Gay, Claudio (1848). Historia física y política de Chile (1749–1808) (in Spanish). Vol. IV. Paris, France: En casa del autor. p. 506.
- Gómez de Vidaurre, Felipe (1889). José Toribio Medina (ed.). Historia Geográfica, Natural y Civil del Reino de Chile Vol. II. Coleccion de historiadores de Chile y documentos relativos a la historia nacional (in Spanish). Vol. XV (Instituto Chileno de Cultura Hispánica, Academia Chilena de la Historia ed.). Santiago, Chile: Imprenta Ercilla.
- Góngora Marmolejo, Alonso de (1960). Historia de Chile desde su descubrimiento hasta el año 1575. Crónicas del Reino de Chile (in Spanish). Madrid, Spain: Atlas. pp. 75–224.
- González de Nájera, Alonso (1866). Desengaño y reparo de la guerra del Reino de Chile. Colección de Documentos Inéditos para la Historia de España (in Spanish). Vol. XLVIII. Madrid, Spain: Imprenta de la Viuda de Calero.
- Jufré del Águila, Melchor (1897). Compendio historial del Descubrimiento y Conquista del Reino de Chile (in Spanish) (Universidad de Chile ed.). Santiago, Chile: Imprenta Cervantes.
- Korth, Eugene E (1968). Spanish Policy in Colonial Chile: the Struggle for Social Justice, 1535–1700. Stanford, CA: Stanford University Press.
- Mariño de Lobera, Pedro (1960). Fr. Bartolomé de Escobar (ed.). Crónica del Reino de Chile, escrita por el capitán Pedro Mariño de Lobera... reducido a nuevo método y estilo por el Padre Bartolomé de Escobar (1593). Crónicas del Reino de Chile (in Spanish). Madrid, Spain: Atlas. pp. 227–562.
- Medina, José Toribio (1906). Diccionario Biográfico Colonial de Chile (PDF) (in Spanish). Santiago, Chile: Imprenta Elzeviriana. pp. 1, 006.
- Pérez García, José (1900). José Toribio Medina (ed.). Historia Natural, Militar, Civil y Sagrada del Reino de Chile (Vol. I) (PDF). Coleccion de historiadores de Chile y documentos relativos a la historia nacional (in Spanish). Vol. XXII (Instituto Chileno de Cultura Hispánica, Academia Chilena de la Historia ed.). Santiago, Chile: Imprenta Elzeviriana.
- Pérez García, José (1900). José Toribio Medina (ed.). Historia Natural, Militar, Civil y Sagrada del Reino de Chile (Vol. II) (PDF). Coleccion de historiadores de Chile y documentos relativos a la historia nacional (in Spanish). Vol. XXIII (Instituto Chileno de Cultura Hispánica, Academia Chilena de la Historia ed.). Santiago, Chile: Imprenta Elzeviriana.
- Prescott, William H (1843). History of the Conquest of Mexico and History of the Peru. New York, NY: The Modern Library.
- Rosales, Diego de (1877). Benjamín Vicuña Mackenna (ed.). Historia general de el Reyno de Chile: Flandes Indiano (1425–1553) (in Spanish). Vol. I. Valparaíso, Chile: Imprenta i Libreria del Mercurio.
- Rosales, Diego de (1878). Benjamín Vicuña Mackenna (ed.). Historia general de el Reyno de Chile: Flandes Indiano (1554–1625) (in Spanish). Vol. II. Valparaíso, Chile: Imprenta i Libreria del Mercurio.
- Rosales, Diego de (1878). Benjamín Vicuña Mackenna (ed.). Historia general de el Reyno de Chile: Flandes Indiano (1625–1655) (in Spanish). Vol. III. Valparaíso, Chile: Imprenta i Libreria del Mercurio.
- Suarez de Figueroa, Cristobal (1616). Enrique Suárez Figaredo (ed.). Hechos de Don García Hurtado de Mendoza (PDF) (in Spanish). Madrid, Spain: Imprenta Real. Archived from the original (PDF) on October 2, 2008.
- Valdivia, Pedro de (1960). Cartas. Crónicas del Reino de Chile (in Spanish). Madrid, Spain: Atlas. pp. 1–74.
- Vicuña Mackenna, Benjamín (1889). Diego de Almagro (in Spanish). Santiago, Chile: Imprenta Cervantes. pp. 122.
- Vivar, Jerónimo de (1987). Crónica y relación copiosa y verdadera de los reinos de Chile (1558) (in Spanish). Madrid, Spain: ARTEHISTORIA REVISTA DIGITAL. Archived from the original on May 26, 2008.
- "Pedro de Valdivia". Vi-E Educación al día (in Spanish). Archived from the original on March 27, 2009.
