= Battle of Penco =

1550 battle during the Arauco War

- Part of Arauco War
Date	March 12, 1550
Location	Vicinity of Penco
Result	Spanish victory

Belligerents
Spanish Empire	Mapuches

Commanders and leaders
Pedro de Valdivia	Toqui Ainavillo

Strength
200 Spanish soldiers: 100 cavalry; 100 infantry; Many natives: 300 Mapochoes; "Indios amigos" of Michimalonco	60,000–80,000 warriors, considered exaggerated, modern estimates 15,000-20,000

Casualties and losses
Some wounded	4,000 killed 200 captured

The Battle of Penco took place on March 12, 1550, between 60,000 Mapuche under the command of their toqui Ainavillo with his Araucan and Tucapel allies and Pedro de Valdivia's 200 Spaniards on horse and afoot with many yanakuna including 300 Mapochoes auxiliaries under their leader Michimalonco, defending their newly raised fort at Penco. It was part of the Arauco war.

== History ==
After toqui Ainavillo's defeat in the Battle of Andalien, he gathered tens of thousands of warriors from the Arauco and Tucapel regions to reinforce his depleted 15,000 man army for an attack on de Valdivia's new settlement at Penco. Meanwhile, de Valdivia's force took eight days to construct a fort with a circuit of 1,500 paces around his new settlement with a ditch 12 feet deep and wide. The excavated earth was used to fill in behind a wall of tree trunks driven into the earth above the ditch. It had three gates with well-built bastions provided with artillery. Following the construction of the fort, de Valdivia established the city of Concepción del Nuevo Extremo there on October 5, 1550. He also sent out patrols of his cavalry to call on the local Mapuche to submit to Spanish rule and provide food and service to the Spanish.

On March 12, Ainavillo's army of sixty thousand warriors advanced against the fort at Penco in three separate bodies with 5,000 skirmishers covering their advance and deployment. Once they had arrived they surrounded the fort on all sides but were not equipped to storm the deep ditch and the wall above it. They could only fire arrows and stones at the walls and shout threats leaving the Spanish safe inside. Inside the fort there was some discontent among the conquistadors at being so hemmed in and letting the Mapuche gain courage thinking the Spaniards were afraid of them by not fighting in the field where their cavalry had always been able to defeat these enemies.

Meanwhile, Ainavillo's command that had been previously defeated at Andalien, was recognized by the Spaniards, and they also saw that the Mapuche divisions were separated from each other in a way that prevented them from aiding one another easily. Jerónimo de Alderete, without de Valdivia's permission, picked out Ainavillo's division for a vigorous charge by his cavalry but the Mapuche had learned to close their ranks, presenting their copper tipped pikes, and this repelled the Spanish charge with some injury to their horses leaving the Mapuche untouched.

Pedro de Valdivia realized that de Alderete had forced his hand and sent out Pedro de Villagra with the rest of the cavalry and directed the softening up of Ainavillo's command by volleys of their firearms and artillery. Jeronimo de Alderete and Pedro de Villagra then led a new charge that broke Ainavillo's disordered division at the first onslaught and they fled with the Spanish in pursuit, followed by the rout of the other two commands of Mapuche upon seeing the spectacle. Where the fleeing Mapuche entered terrain the cavalry could not follow, the Spanish foot and Michimalonco's warriors followed killing many. The battlefield was littered with discarded weapons, 300 dead Indians killed in the clash with Ainavillo alone, according to Vivar, 4,000 was the total Mapuche loss after the pursuit, according to Lobera, and 200 were captured including many leaders of the army. Pedro de Valdivia had the nose and one hand of each of the prisoners cut off and sent them back with a message that the Mapuche should now submit to Spanish rule. Soon afterward the Mapuche leaders came to submit to the Spanish.

== Sources ==
Pedro de Valdivia commanded in this campaign and battle. Jerónimo de Vivar wrote as a participant in this campaign and battle. Pedro Mariño de Lobera writes he was a witness to this battle. Alonso de Góngora Marmolejo arrived in Concepcion in 1551 and so wrote about it from other participants accounts.

- Pedro de Valdivia, Cartas de Pedro de Valdivia (Letters of Pedro Valdivia), University of Chile: Diarios, Memorias y Relatos Testimoniales: (on line in Spanish) Carta, Al emperador Carlos V, Concepción, 15 de octubre de 1550
- Jerónimo de Vivar, Crónica y relación copiosa y verdadera de los reinos de Chile (Chronicle and abundant and true relation of the kingdoms of Chile) ARTEHISTORIA REVISTA DIGITAL; Crónicas de América (on line in Spanish) Capítulo XCIV and XCV
- Alonso de Góngora Marmolejo, Historia de Todas las Cosas que han Acaecido en el Reino de Chile y de los que lo han gobernado (1536-1575) (History of All the Things that Have happened in the Kingdom of Chile and of those that have governed it (1536-1575)), University of Chile: Document Collections in complete texts: Cronicles (on line in Spanish) Capítulo X
- Pedro Mariño de Lobera, Crónica del Reino de Chile, escrita por el capitán Pedro Mariño de Lobera....reducido a nuevo método y estilo por el Padre Bartolomé de Escobar. Edición digital a partir de Crónicas del Reino de Chile Madrid, Atlas, 1960, pp. 227-562, (Biblioteca de Autores Españoles; 569-575). Biblioteca Virtual Miguel de Cervantes (on line in Spanish) Capítulo XXXI
