= Quepuantú =

Quepuantú (died 1632) was an indigenous Chilean Moluche toqui (military leader) in the 17th century. He was known for his leadership in the Arauco War and succeeded Butapichón in commanded the Mapuche army against the Spanish as Toqui, from 1631 to 1632. On January 13, 1631 he commanded the Mapuche army with Butapichón against Spanish forces led by the very competent Governor Francisco Laso de la Vega who defeated them in the pitched battle of La Albarrada. He died in 1632 in a duel with the cacique Loncomilla, his rival for dominance in the command of his tribe. Butapichón succeeded him as Toqui for a second time from 1632 to 1634.
