= Battle of Andalien =

Part of the Arauco War

- Part of Arauco War
Date	February 6, 1550
Location	Vicinity of Andalién River
Result	Spanish victory

Belligerents
Spanish Empire	Mapuches

Commanders and leaders
Pedro de Valdivia	Toqui Ainavillo

Strength
200 Spanish soldiers: 100 cavalry; 100 infantry; Many natives: 300 Mapochoes	5,000–20,000 warriors

Casualties and losses
1 Spaniard killed over 100 wounded many Yanaconas dead and wounded 60 horses wounded	3,000 Mapuche

The Battle of Andalien, fought in early February 1550, was a night battle between 20,000 Mapuche under the command of their Toqui Ainavillo and Pedro de Valdivia's army of 200 Spanish soldiers and cavalry with a large number of yanakuna, including 300 Mapochoes auxiliaries under their leader Michimalonco.

== History ==
After Pedro de Valdivia reached the Bio-Bio River on January 24, 1550, he began to explore the river valleys and engaged in clashes with increasing numbers of Mapuche warriors. After about ten days he turned toward the sea marching to a plain between the Bio-Bio and Andalién River with a lake protecting his camp on one side. Here he stayed for two days and nights. On the second night the Toqui Ainavillo and 20,000 warriors in three divisions, came out of the local wooded hills and advanced on the Spanish camp believing the night would render the Spanish horsemen ineffective and possibly make the horses timid. They also hoped to catch the Spanish unaware. However, the Spanish were on alert; each night Valdivia had had half his soldiers standing watch at all times during the night and all asleep were ready to wake and face any night attack. The lake forced the Mapuche to approach the camp on one side so they were pressed close together by the lake and river forming a dense column.

The night attack was defeated after a fierce three-hour battle. Valdivia was not able to break the dense Mapuche formation using cavalry charges, and his horses were often wounded in the fighting. Valdivia eventually ordered his men to dismount and fight on foot with his other soldiers. The armoured Spaniards' swords and shields, as well as arquebuses and the arrows of the Mapochoes eventually killed about three hundred Mapuche and wounded many more. Those that died were pressed forward by the warriors behind so that they left piles of bodies before the Spanish line. Finally the Mapuche were driven back, tired, their ranks thinned and in disorder, their archers without arrows. Seeing this the Spaniards countercharged and broke them just at dawn. Valdivia then sent Michimalonco and his 300 Mapochoes to pursue them, killing many others in this pursuit into the woodlands. Altogether 3,000 Mapuche were killed in the battle and pursuit according to Lobera. The Spaniards suffered just one death, due to friendly fire, but many soldiers had wounds as did many of their mounts. After a day treating the wounded they continued onward towards their rendezvous at Penco on the Bay of Concepción with the ships of Juan Bautista Pastene.

== See also ==
- Battle of Penco

== Sources ==
Pedro de Valdivia commanded in this campaign and battle. Jerónimo de Vivar wrote as a participant in this campaign and battle and Pedro Mariño de Lobera arrived days afterward with the ships at Penco. Alonso de Góngora Marmolejo arrived in Concepcion in 1551 and so wrote about it from other participants accounts.

- Pedro de Valdivia, Cartas de Pedro de Valdivia (Letters of Pedro Valdivia), University of Chile: Diarios, Memorias y Relatos Testimoniales: (on line in Spanish) Carta, Al emperador Carlos V, Concepción, 15 de octubre de 1550
- Jerónimo de Vivar, Crónica y relación copiosa y verdadera de los reinos de Chile (Chronicle and abundant and true relation of the kingdoms of Chile) Artehistoria – Revista digital; Crónicas de América (on line in Spanish) Capítulo XCIV and XCV
- de Góngora Marmolejo, Alonso, Historia de Todas las Cosas que han Acaecido en el Reino de Chile y de los que lo han gobernado (1536–1575) (History of All the Things that Have happened in the Kingdom of Chile and of those that have governed it (1536–1575)), University of Chile: Document Collections in complete texts: Cronicles (on line in Spanish) Capítulo X
- Mariño de Lobera, Pedro, Crónica del Reino de Chile, escrita por el capitán Pedro Mariño de Lobera....reducido a nuevo método y estilo por el Padre Bartolomé de Escobar. Edición digital a partir de Crónicas del Reino de Chile Madrid, Atlas, 1960, pp. 227–562, (Biblioteca de Autores Españoles; 569–575). Biblioteca Virtual Miguel de Cervantes (on line in Spanish) Capítulo XXXI
