= Guanoalca =

Guanoalca (or Huenualca) (died 1590) was the Mapuche toqui (leader) elected in 1586 following the death in battle of the previous toqui, Cadeguala, killed in a duel with the garrison commander of the Spanish fort at Purén in 1586. He returned to continue the siege and forced the Spanish to evacuate the fort, which he then destroyed.

He then directed his army against the Spanish fort newly built on the heights of Marihueñu but finding it too strongly held to attack he diverted his attacks against the newly established fort of Espíritu Santo, in the valley of Catirai where the Tavolevo River meets the Bio Bio River and the fort of Santísima Trinidad on the opposite shore. The governor Alonso de Sotomayor, evacuated Trinidad in 1591.

While he was toqui in the south near Villa Rica, the female leader Janequeo led Mapuche and Pehuenche warriors against the Spanish.

The old toqui Guanoalca died at the end of 1590, and in 1591, Quintuguenu was his successor.

== Sources ==
- The Geographical, Natural, and Civil History of Chili By Don Juan Ignatius Molina, Longman, Hurst, Rees, and Orme, Paternoster-Row, London, 1809
- José Ignacio Víctor Eyzaguirre, Historia eclesiastica: Politica y literaria de Chile, IMPRENTA DEL COMERCIO, VALPARAISO, June 1830 List of Toquis, pg. 162–163, 498–500.
