= Quintunguenu =

Quintunguenu (died 1591) was a Mapuche caudillo, or military leader. He was known for his valor in the assault of Marihuenu in 1591. He died fighting against the Spanish in the mountains of Marihuenu, Chile.
