= Cadeguala =

Cadeguala or Cadiguala was a Mapuche toqui (Note: Indigenous war time leader in what is now the modern-day Chile region of South America.) elected in 1585 following the death in battle of the previous toqui Nangoniel. Cadeguala was a noted warrior and the first Mapuche toqui known to have used cavalry successfully in battle. He was killed in a duel with the garrison commander of the Spanish fort at Purén in 1586.

While very young he entered the Mapuche army as a private, although he was a nobleman, and gradually won promotion to the grade of general. The toqui, Cayancaru, gave him command of a strong army to attack the city of Angol, which he did without success, but then marched to the city of Arauco, besieged and entered it. Afterward he intended to attack Fort Trinidad, this fortress commanding the passage from Bio-bio River, but a body of Spanish troops under Francisco Hernandez came out and defeated Cadeguala, who lost an arm and was otherwise severely wounded. This forced him to retire to the mountains. He was followed thither by the lieutenant-governor of Chile, who attempted an ambush, only to be discovered, defeated, and killed, with 50 of his men, 14 November 1586. On the same day Cadeguala was elected toqui by acclamation.

Following his election, Cadeguala began operations against the Spanish and then attacked Angol breaking into the city with the aid of sympathetic Mapuche that set fires within the town. However the arrival of the governor Alonso de Sotomayor inspired a counterattack by the residents that had fled to the citadel driving the Mapuche back out of the town. Deprived of success there he followed with a siege of the Spanish fort at Purén the following year with 4,000 warriors. After driving off a relief force led by Governor Sotomayor with his 150 lancers he offered the garrison a chance to withdraw or join his army which was refused by all but one. He next challenged the commander of the fort, Alonso García de Ramón, to single combat to decide the fate of the fortress. The two leaders fought on horseback with lances, and Cadeguala fell, killed by his opponent's weapon in the first tilt. Even when dying, the Mapuche warrior would not admit defeat, and tried in vain to mount his horse again. His army raised the siege but after electing Guanoalca as toqui returned to successfully drive the poorly supplied Spanish from Purén.

== General references ==
- Coleccíon de historiadores de Chile [Chile historians collection] (in Spanish). Vol. 15. Santiago: Imprenta del Ferrocarril. 1899.
- Eyzaguirre, José (June 1830). Historia eclesiastica: Politica y literaria de Chile [Ecclesiastic, political, and literary history of Chile] (in Spanish). Valparaíso: Imprenta del Comercio. pp. 162, 163, 498–500.
- Hancock, Anson (1893). A History of Chile. Chicago: C. H. Sergel and Company.
- Kerr, Robert (1824). A General History and Collection of Voyages and Travels. pp. 338–340.
- Mariño, Pedro (1960). "Crónica del Reino de Chile" [Chronicle of the Kingdom of Chile]. Cervantes Virtual. pp. 227–562.
- Molina, Juan (1809). "IV". The Geographical, Natural, and Civil History of Chili. London: Longman, Hurst, Rees, and Orme. ISBN 9781108049450.
- De Rosales, Diego (1877–1878). "52-54". Historia general del reino de Chile. Flandes Indiano [General History of the Kingdom of Chile. Indian Flanders] (in Spanish). Vol. 2.
- De Vidaurre, Gomez (1535–1764). Historia Geográfica, Natural y Civil del Reino de Chile [Civil, Natural and Geographic History of the Kingdom of Chile] (in Spanish). Vol. 2. pp. 161–163.
