= Battle of Catirai =

1569 battle

Coordinates: 37°11′08″S 72°55′58″W

- Part of Arauco War
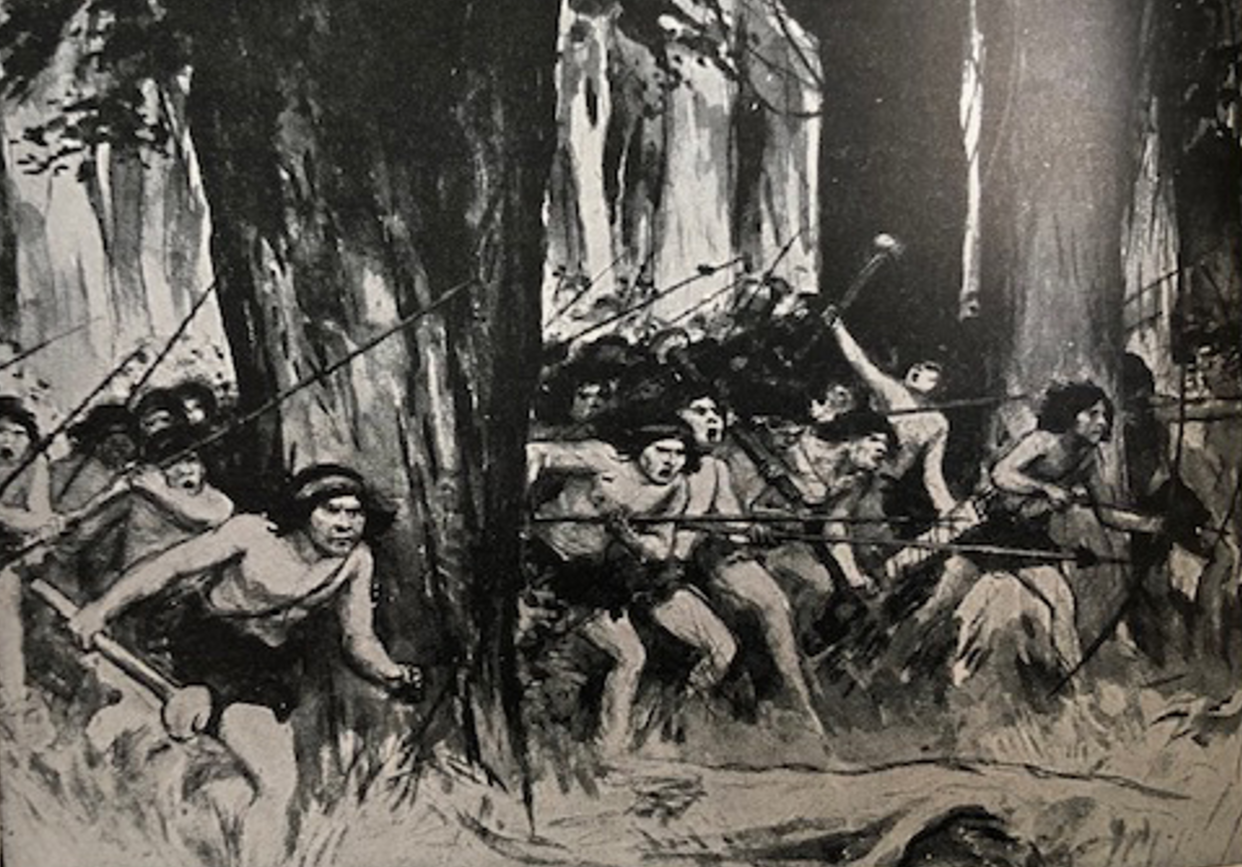
- Mapuche warriors charging through the forest
Date	January 7, 1569
Location	A hill in Catirai, Chile
Result	Mapuche victory

Belligerents
Spanish Empire	Mapuches

Commanders and leaders
Martín Ruiz de Gamboa	Llanganabal; Millalelmo

Strength
220 Spanish soldiers 600 Indian auxiliaries	2,000 warriors

The Battle of Catirai was a battle that took place on January 7, 1569, in the Catirai region in Chile during the Arauco War. The battle was fought between Mapuche forces led by the chieftains Llanganabal and Millalelmo, and forces of the Spanish Empire led by General Martín Ruiz de Gamboa, and it resulted in a Mapuche victory. The Mapuches successfully defended their wooden fort on a hill against a Spanish attack.

== History ==
By 1569, Llanganabal had risen to become the Toki (war leader) of the Mapuches, with Millalelmo and others as his subordinates. Millalelmo had built a wooden fort on top of a steep forested hill in the Catirai region. This fort was built as a base to defend against raids by Spanish troops, who were burning the farms and Rukas of the Mapuches south of the Bio-Bío River. The Mapuche fort had palisades and only one door that could be entered through. Knowing that the Spaniards would try to destroy the fort, Millalelmo ordered his men to look for stones "the size of quinces" from around the hillsides, and to gather the stones in piles in front of the fort so they could be used to defend it.

The fort was scouted by Spanish Captain Lorenzo Bernal del Mercado, who warned his superiors against attacking the fort due to its strong defensive position. However, some Spanish soldiers and officials who had just recently arrived in Chile, and were inexperienced in fighting the Mapuches, managed to convince Governor Melchor de Saravia to order an attack on the fort, claiming that not attacking it would be waging war in a weak manner. Governor Saravia ordered General Martín Ruiz de Gamboa to lead an attack on the Mapuche fort.

General Ruiz de Gamboa and his army arrived at the hill of the fort on January 7, 1569, on a hot and sunny day. Gamboa divided his troops into different groups before beginning his attack up the hill. The Spanish soldiers began to advance up the forested hill, and they fired their arquebus guns at the fort as they approached it. The Indian auxiliaries also advanced up the hill, and they supported the Spaniards by firing their arrows at the Mapuche fort. As the Spaniards and their auxiliaries finally got close to the fort, they were abruptly pelted with stones by the Mapuche warriors. The Mapuches' stone throwing wreaked havoc among the Spaniards, breaking many of their limbs and greatly disorienting them. As the Spaniards began to lose their cohesion from the stones, the Mapuches suddenly counter-attacked and charged through the forest. The Mapuche charge routed the Spaniards, and it made them flee away from the fort. The Mapuches continued to chase Gamboa and his men as they retreated to San Felipe de Rauco.

Martin Ruiz de Gamboa was publicly condemned for the Spanish defeat at Catirai. He became disgraced among the Spanish colonists of Chile, and he even had his encomienda confiscated by the colonial government for his defeat. The Mapuches celebrated their victory at Catirai by partying for several days.

== Sources ==
- Alonso de Góngora Marmolejo, Historia de Todas las Cosas que han Acaecido en el Reino de Chile y de los que lo han gobernado (1536-1575) (History of All the Things that Have happened in the Kingdom of Chile and of those that have governed it (1536-1575)), Edición digital a partir de Crónicas del Reino de Chile, Madrid, Atlas, 1960, pp. 75–224, (on line in Spanish) (History of Chile 1536–1575)
  - Capítulo LXIII De cómo el gobernador Saravia salió de Santiago para ir a la Concepción, y de cómo nombró por su general a don Miguel de Velasco, y de las cosas que acaescieron
  - Capítulo LXIV De cómo el gobernador Saravia hizo consulta de guerra con los capitanes que llevaba, y la plática que propuso por dónde se acertaría mejor a hacer, y de lo que se proveyó
  - Capítulo LXV De cómo el gobernador Saravia envió al general don Miguel a deshacer una junta de indios, y cómo después de venido le mandó ir a deshacer el fuerte de Catiray, y donde lo desbarataron, y lo demás que acaeció
- Pedro Mariño de Lobera, Crónica del Reino de Chile, escrita por el capitán Pedro Mariño de Lobera....reducido a nuevo método y estilo por el Padre Bartolomé de Escobar. Edición digital a partir de Crónicas del Reino de Chile Madrid, Atlas, 1960, pp. 227-562 (Biblioteca de Autores Españoles; 569-575). Biblioteca Virtual Miguel de Cervantes (on line in Spanish) (History of Chile 1535–1595)
  - Libro segundo, Parte tercera, Capítulo XXX De la entrada del doctor Saravia por presidente y gobernador de Chile, y de don Antonio de San Miguel obispo de la ciudad Imperial
  - Libro segundo, Parte tercera, Capítulo XXXI De algunas batallas que tuvieron el doctor Bravo de Saravia, don Miguel de Velasco y Lorenzo Bernal contra el indio Millalermo y otros capitanes bárbaros de mucha fama
- Diego de Rosales, Historia general de el Reino de Chile, Flandes Indiano Tomo II, CAPÍTULO XL; Impr. del Mercurio, Santiago 1878, Original from Harvard University Digitized May 21, 2007
- Diego Barros Arana, Historia general de Chile. Tomo segundo, Capítulo IV Administración de la Real Audiencia (1567-1568). Principio del gobierno del doctor Bravo de Saravia (1568-1569)
