= Alejo =

Alejo is a given name. Notable people with the name include:

- Alejo Carpentier (1904–1980), Cuban novelist
- Alejo Corral (born 1981), Argentine rugby union player
- Alejo Cruz (born 2000), Uruguayan football player
- Alejo Durán (1919–1989), Colombian musician and songwriter
- Alejo Durán (rugby union) (born 1991), Uruguayan rugby union player
- Alejo Fernández (c. 1475 – c. 1545), Spanish painter
- Alejo García Pintos (born 1967), Argentine actor
- Alejo Garza Tamez (1933–2010), Mexican businessman
- Alejo Igoa (born 1996), Argentine YouTuber
- Alejo Lascano Bahamonde (1840–1904), Ecuadorian physician
- Alejo López (born 1996), Mexican baseball player
- Alejo Lorenzo Lingua Lavallén (born 2001), Argentine tennis player
- Alejo Mabanag (1886–?), Filipino lawyer and politician
- Alejo Miranda de Larra (born 1981), Spanish politician
- Alejo Montero (born 1998), Argentine footballer
- Alejo Pacheco-Vera (born 1954), Mexican bishop
- Alejo Peralta (1916–1997), Mexican baseball executive
- Alejo Peyret (1826–1902), Argentine politician and historian
- Alejo Santos (1911–1984), Filipino soldier and politician
- Alejo Sarco (born 2006), Argentine footballer
- Alejo Sauras (born 1979), Spanish actor
- Alejo Tabares (born 2001), Argentine footballer
- Alejo Umpiérrez (born 1965), Uruguayan politician
- Alejo Véliz (disambiguation), several people
- Alejo Vidal-Quadras Roca (born 1945), Spanish politician and radiation physicist
