= Pedro Hernández de Córdova =

Pedro Hernández de Córdova (? -?) was a Spanish soldier who was occupied in the Arauco War. A Captain in fall of 1564, he led thirty soldiers in an attempt to reinforce Concepcion. Blocked by winter rains and the hostile Mapuche his force remained north of the Maule River until spring of 1565 observing the frontier with the hostiles. He joined the army of Pedro de Villagra moving south and was with it at the defeat of the Mapuche in the Second Battle of Reinohuelén and in the Battle of Tulmillán and the subsequent months of mopping up operations to suppress the Mapuche revolt north of the Bio-Bio River.

In later years he was taken prisoner by the Mapuches and was rescued at the beginning of 1606.

== Sources ==
- Diego Barros Arana, Historia jeneral de Chile, Tomo II, R. Jover, Santiago, 1884 Original from Oxford University, Digitized Nov 2, 2007
- José Toribio Medina, Diccionario biográfico colonial de Chile, Impr. Elziviriana, Santiago, 1906 PDF, pg. 404 Pedro Hernández de Córdoba
