= Butapichón =

Butapichón or Butapichún or Putapichon was the Mapuche toqui from 1625 to 1631, as successor to Lientur. After the death of Quepuantú in 1632 he became toqui once again from 1632 to 1634.

Butapichón as toqui lead the Mapuche in successful malones and battles against Spanish forces. On January 24, 1630 he managed to ambush the maestre de campo Alonso de Córdoba y Figueroa in Pilcohué without achieving the victory but causing them many casualties. After Quepuantú succeeded him as Toqui the two fought the Spanish led by the very competent Governor Francisco Laso de la Vega who finally defeated them in the pitched battle of La Albarrada on January 13, 1631. Thereafter he refused to engage in open battles against Laso de la Vega, reverting to the Malón strategy of Lientur. The toqui Huenucalquin succeeded Butapichón.

== Sources ==
- Diego de Rosales, “Historia General del Reino de Chile”, Flandes Indiano, 3 tomos. Valparaíso 1877 – 1878.
  - Historia general de el Reyno de Chile: Flandes Indiano Vol. 3 LIBRO VI. LA GUERRA DEFENSIVA. CAPÍTULO XXIII; Libro VII DEL GOBIERNO DE FERNANDEZ DE CÓRDOVA AL DE LAZO DE LA VEGA. 1625–1639. CAPITULO XII.
- Pedro de Cordoba y Figueroa, Historia de Chile (1492–1717), Coleccion de historiadores de Chile y documentos relativos a la historia nacional, Tomo II, Instituto Chileno de Cultura Hispánica, Academia Chilena de la Historia, Imprenta del Ferrocarril, Santiago, Chile, 1862
- Miguel de Olivares, Historia De La Compania De Jesus En Chile (1593–1736), Coleccion de historiadores de Chile y documentos relativos a la historia nacional, Tomo VII, Instituto Chileno de Cultura Hispánica, Academia Chilena de la Historia, Imprenta del Ferrocarril, 1874.
- Vicente Carvallo y Goyeneche, Descripcion histórico-jeográfica del Reino de Chile, TOMO I, precedida de una biografia del autor por don Miguel L. Amunátegui, Coleccion de historiadores de Chile y documentos relativos a la historia nacional, Tomo VIII, Imprenta de la Libreria Del Mercurio de A. y M. Echeverria, Morando Núm. 38. Santiago de Chile, 1878
