= Juan de Lebu =

Juan de Lebú was a Moluche cacique or Ulmen of the Lebu region, captured by the Spanish sometime before 1568. He was sent to Peru and the Spaniards had baptized him with the name of Juan. He returned in 1568, with the new Governor Melchor Bravo de Saravia. When he had the chance he escaped and returned to his people to help them in the war against the Spanish Empire. Because he had become familiar with European tactics like Paineñamcu (Alonso Diaz), they became close collaborators in the war.

During Governor Rodrigo de Quiroga's first campaign in 1578, there was a raid that attempted to burn down the Spanish winter camp at Arauco. Juan de Lebú and seven other lonkos were captured in a retaliatory raid against the perpetrators by the Spanish under Rodrigo the nephew of Quiroga. To punish them as an example the seven lonkos were hanged from trees while Juan de Lebú suffered the same punishment as Caupolican, impalement.
