= Huenecura =

Toqui (wartime military leader) of the Mapuche from 1604 to 1610

Huenecura or Huenencura was the Mapuche Toqui from 1604 to 1610. He replaced Paillamachu who died in 1603. He was replaced by Aillavilu in 1610.

== Sources ==
- Juan Ignatius Molina, The Geographical, Natural, and Civil History of Chili, Vol II., Longman, Hurst, Rees, and Orme, London, 1809
- José Ignacio Víctor Eyzaguirre, Historia eclesiastica: Politica y literaria de Chile, IMPRENTA DEL COMERCIO, VALPARAISO, June 1830 List of Toquis, pp. 162–163, 498–500.
