= Malloquete =

Malloquete (died February 11, 1546) was a Mapuche toqui that led an army of Moluche from the region north of the Bio Bio River against Pedro de Valdivia in the 1546 Battle of Quilacura.

== Sources ==
- Jerónimo de Vivar, Crónica y relación copiosa y verdadera de los reinos de Chile (Chronicle and abundant and true relation of the kingdoms of Chile) ARTEHISTORIA REVISTA DIGITAL; Crónicas de América (on line in Spanish)
  - Capítulo LXVI, Que trata de lo que le sucedió al general Pedro de Valdivia junto al río de Andalién
