= Nangoniel =

Nangoniel was the Mapuche Toqui in 1585, and son of the previous toqui Cayancaru. He was the first Toqui to use cavalry with the Mapuche army.

Following the failure of his siege of Arauco, Cayancura, retired, leaving the command of the army to his son Nangoniel. He collected some infantry, and a hundred and fifty horse, which from then on began to be part of Mapuche armies. Nangoniel returned to invest the Arauco fortress again, and with his cavalry it became so closely invested, that the Spaniards were unable to supply it and were forced to evacuate it. Following this success he moved against the fort of Santísima Trinidad which protected the passage of Spanish supplies via the Bio-bio River but clashed with a division of Spanish troops, under Francisco Hernández, where he lost an arm and had other dangerous wounds. He retreated to a neighbouring mountain, where he was ambushed by a Spanish force and slain with 50 of his soldiers. The same day Cadeguala was proclaimed Toqui by the Mapuche army.

== Sources ==
- The Geographical, Natural, and Civil History of Chili By Don Juan Ignatius Molina, Longman, Hurst, Rees, and Orme, Paternoster-Row, London, 1809 pg 234-35
- José Ignacio Víctor Eyzaguirre, Historia eclesiastica: Politica y literaria de Chile, IMPRENTA DEL COMERCIO, VALPARAISO, June 1830 List of Toquis, pg. 162-163.
