= Battle of Quilacura =

1546 battle of the Arauco War

- Part of Arauco War
Date	February 11, 1546
Location	Quilacura in the vicinity of the Bio-Bio River
Result	Spanish victory

Belligerents
Spanish Empire	Mapuches

Commanders and leaders
Pedro de Valdivia	Malloquete †

Strength
60 Spanish soldiers many yanakuna	7,000–8,000 warriors according to Valdivia, considered exaggerated, modern estimates 1,500–2,000

Casualties and losses
6 Spaniards killed 6 wounded 2 horses killed	Up to 200 warriors, including Malloquete

Battle of Quilacura took place during the Arauco War, fought at night, four leagues from the Bio-Bio River, between the Spanish expedition of Pedro de Valdivia and a force of Mapuche warriors led by Malloquete on February 11, 1546.

== Sources ==
- Pedro de Valdivia, Cartas de Pedro de Valdivia (Letters of Pedro Valdivia),Carta, Al emperador Carlos V, Concepción, 15 de octubre de 1550, University of Chile: Diarios, Memorias y Relatos Testimoniales: (on line in Spanish)
- Jerónimo de Vivar, Crónica y relación copiosa y verdadera de los reinos de Chile (Chronicle and abundant and true relation of the kingdoms of Chile) ARTEHISTORIA REVISTA DIGITAL; Crónicas de América (on line in Spanish)
  - Capítulo LXV, Que trata de cómo después de haber salido el general Pedro de Valdivia de la villa de la Serena mandó al piloto de un bergantín que estaba allí que se decía Luis Hernández que se fuese al puerto de Valparaíso
  - Capítulo LXVI, Que trata de lo que le sucedió al general Pedro de Valdivia junto al río de Andalién
- Alonso de Góngora Marmolejo, Historia de Todas las Cosas que han Acaecido en el Reino de Chile y de los que lo han gobernado (1536–1575) (History of All the Things that Have happened in the Kingdom of Chile and of those that have governed it (1536–1575)), University of Chile: Document Collections in complete texts: Cronicles (on line in Spanish)
  - Capítulo VI. De las cosas que hizo Valdivia después que llegó el capitán Alonso de Monroy a Santiago
- Pedro Mariño de Lobera, Crónica del Reino de Chile, escrita por el capitán Pedro Mariño de Lobera....reducido a nuevo método y estilo por el Padre Bartolomé de Escobar. Edición digital a partir de Crónicas del Reino de Chile Madrid, Atlas, 1960, pp. 227–562, (Biblioteca de Autores Españoles; 569-575). Biblioteca Virtual Miguel de Cervantes (on line in Spanish)
  - Capítulo XVII, De la batalla que hubo en Penco entre los indios y los españoles, habiendo Valdivia conquistado los Paramocaes
- Diego de Rosales, “Historia General del Reino de Chile”, Flandes Indiano, 3 tomos. Valparaíso, IMPRENTA DEL MERCURIO 1877 - 1878.
  - Tomo I, CAPÍTULO XVII. Con la paz saca Valdivia sesenta mil pesos de oro en ocho meses. Embia con ellos al Perú por socorro de gente y ropa. Conquista a los Promocaes. Puebla la ciudad de la Serena y socórrela. Encomienda los indios hasta Maule, y passa venciendo y conquistando hasta Penco y Biobio.
- Carvallo y Goyeneche, Vicente, Descripcion Histórico Geografía del Reino de Chile (Description Historical Geography of the Kingdom of Chile), University of Chile: Document Collections in complete texts: Cronicles (on line in Spanish)
  - Tomo I, Capítulo XV. Disposiciones Gubernativas de Pedro de Valdivia - Restauracion de La Serena i Copiapó - Envia al Perú en solicitud de jente, i sale para el Estado de Arauco - Funda en el valle de Penco la ciudad de La Concepcion, i se refiere la Batalla
