= Llanganabal =

Moluche toqui

Llanganabal was a Moluche toqui who led the Mapuche army that defeated the Spanish led by Martín Ruiz de Gamboa in the Battle of Catirai in 1569. In 1560 Llanganabal is listed as one of the caciques heading an encomienda along the Bio Bio River. Shortly after began the outbreak of the 1561 Mapuche revolt. By 1569 Llanganabal had risen to command the Araucan army with Millalelmo and other captains as his subordinates. To resist the Spanish who had been burning the fields and houses on the south bank of the Bio Bio, Millalelmo had built a strong fortress on a hill in Catirai in a difficult position on steep wooded slopes. Despite the warnings of Lorenzo Bernal del Mercado who had reconnoitered the position, Spaniards new to Chile and the Arauco War prevailed on Governor Melchor Bravo de Saravia to order Martín Ruiz de Gamboa to take his command and attack the place. Meanwhile, Llanganabal had gathered all his army there to resist the attack. Gamboa's force was badly defeated while attempting to attack up the steep thickly wooded hill into Llanganabal's fortified position.

== Sources ==
- Alonso de Góngora Marmolejo, Historia de Todas las Cosas que han Acaecido en el Reino de Chile y de los que lo han gobernado (1536-1575) (History of All the Things that Have happened in the Kingdom of Chile and of those that have governed it (1536-1575), Edición digital a partir de Crónicas del Reino de Chile, Madrid, Atlas, 1960, pp. 75–224, (on line in Spanish) (History of Chile 1536-1575)
- Pedro Mariño de Lobera, Crónica del Reino de Chile, escrita por el capitán Pedro Mariño de Lobera....reducido a nuevo método y estilo por el Padre Bartolomé de Escobar. Edición digital a partir de Crónicas del Reino de Chile Madrid, Atlas, 1960, pp. 227-562, (Biblioteca de Autores Españoles; 569-575). Biblioteca Virtual Miguel de Cervantes (on line in Spanish) (History of Chile 1535-1595)
- José Toribio Medina, Colección de documentos inéditos para la historia de Chile, desde el viaje de Magallanes hasta la batalla de Maipo, 1518-1818, Tomo X. Impr. Ercilla, Santiago, 1896 Original from Harvard University, Digitized May 18, 2007
