= Confines =

Coordinates: 6°25′N 73°10′W

- Municipality and town
- Flag Seal

- Location of the municipality and town of Confines in the Santander Department of Colombia.
- Country: Colombia
- Department: Santander Department
- Time zone: UTC-5 (Colombia Standard Time)

Confines is a town and municipality in the Santander Department in northeastern Colombia.
