= Pailacar =

16th century leader of Purén

Pailacar or Paylacar was a leader of Purén, who led a force of 2000 warriors in the defeat of the Spanish army of Don Miguel Avendaño de Velasco in the Battle of Purén in September 1570.

== Sources ==
- Alonso de Góngora Marmolejo, Historia de Todas las Cosas que han Acaecido en el Reino de Chile y de los que lo han gobernado (1536-1575) (History of All the Things that Have happened in the Kingdom of Chile and of those that have governed it (1536-1575), Edición digital a partir de Crónicas del Reino de Chile, Madrid, Atlas, 1960, pp. 75–224, (on line in Spanish) (History of Chile 1536-1575)
- Pedro Mariño de Lobera, Crónica del Reino de Chile, escrita por el capitán Pedro Mariño de Lobera....reducido a nuevo método y estilo por el Padre Bartolomé de Escobar. Edición digital a partir de Crónicas del Reino de Chile Madrid, Atlas, 1960, pp. 227-562, (Biblioteca de Autores Españoles; 569-575). Biblioteca Virtual Miguel de Cervantes (on line in Spanish) (History of Chile 1535-1595)
- Diego de Rosales, Historia General del Reino de Chile, Flandes Indiano, Tomo II, Valparaíso 1877 - 1878. (1554-1625)
- Diego Barrios Arana, Historia general de Chile, Tomo segundo, Capítulo V Gobierno de Bravo de Saravia: administración civil. Fin de su gobierno y supresión de la Real Audiencia (1569-1575)
