= Quintuguenu =

Quintuguenu (died 1591) was the Mapuche toqui (leader) in the Arauco War elected in 1591 following the death of the old toqui Guanoalca. He was killed in battle the same year. Paillaeco was elected as his successor in 1592.

== Sources ==
- The Geographical, Natural, and Civil History of Chili By Don Juan Ignatius Molina, Longman, Hurst, Rees, and Orme, Paternoster-Row, London, 1809
- José Ignacio Víctor Eyzaguirre, Historia eclesiastica: Politica y literaria de Chile, IMPRENTA DEL COMERCIO, VALPARAISO, June 1830 List of Toquis, pg. 162-163, 498-500.
