= Lientur =

Mapuches's militar chief

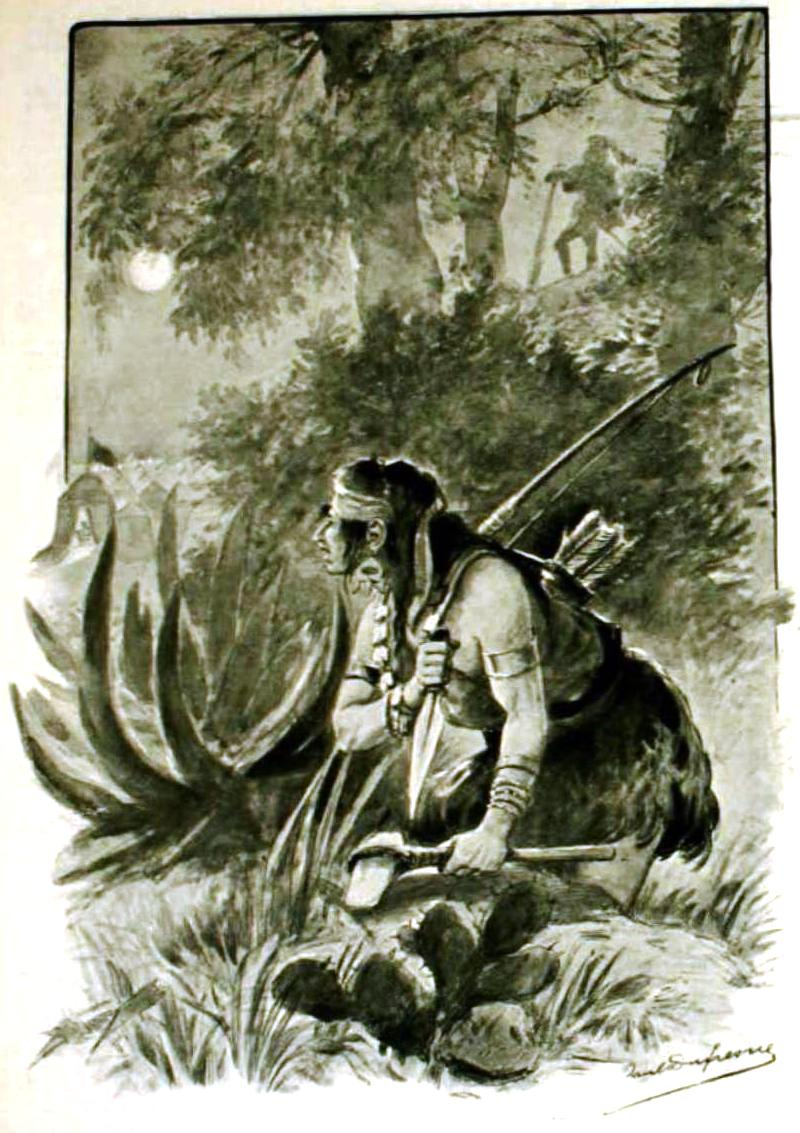
Lientur depicted by Paul Dufresne in 1905

Lientur was the Mapuche toqui from 1618 to 1625. He was the successor to Loncothegua. Lientur with his vice toqui Levipillan was famed for his rapid malóns or raids. Because of his ability to slip back and forth over the Spanish border between its fortresses and patrols and raid deep into Spanish territory north of the Bio-Bio River without losses he was called the Wizard by the Spanish.

In 1625 his successor Butapichón was elected when he resigned his office when he felt himself to be too old and tired to continue as before. However a cacique named Lientur continued to lead troops in the field. He was present leading troops at the Battle of Las Cangrejeras. A cacique of that name also participated in the Parliament of Quillín in 1641.

== Sources ==
- Diego de Rosales, “Historia General del Reino de Chile”, Flandes Indiano, 3 tomos. Valparaíso 1877-1878.
  - Historia general de el Reyno de Chile: Flandes Indiano Vol. 2
  - Historia general de el Reyno de Chile: Flandes Indiano Vol. 3
- Vicente Carvallo y Goyeneche, Descripcion histórico-jeográfica del Reino de Chile TOMO I, precedida de una biografia del autor por don Miguel L. Amunátegui, Coleccion de historiadores de Chile y documentos relativos a la historia nacional TOMO VIII, SANTIAGO DE CHILE: IMPRENTA DE LA LIBRERÍA DEL MERCURIO de A. y M. Echeverria, Morando Núm. 38. 1878 (History of Chile 1542-1788)
- Juan Ignatius Molina, The Geographical, Natural, and Civil History of Chili, Longman, Hurst, Rees, and Orme, London, 1809
- José Ignacio Víctor Eyzaguirre, Historia eclesiastica: Politica y literaria de Chile, IMPRENTA DEL COMERCIO, VALPARAISO, June 1830 List of Toquis, pg. 498-500.
- Anson Uriel Hancock, A History of Chile, Chicago, C. H. Sergel and Company, 1893
