= Paillataru =

Paillataru was the toqui of the Mapuche from 1564 to 1574. He succeeded Illangulién in 1564 following his death in the Battle of Angol. Paillataru was said to be the brother or cousin of Lautaro.

During the first years of his command he led raids from time to time to ravage and plunder the possessions of the Spaniards, always avoiding a decisive conflict. In 1565, Paillataru with a body of troops harassed the neighborhood of the city of Cañete... The Real Audiencia of Chile that had taken control of the government of Chile, attempted to make peace with Paillataru. He conducted negotiations but with the aim to delay the conflict not end it. During the negotiations, Paillataru took the opportunity to build a pukara in a naturally strong position within two leagues of Cañete.

When it became known in Concepción of Paillataru's activity, the court lost their hopes for peace, and appointed captain Martin Ruiz de Gamboa to head an army of 100 Spaniards and 200 Indian auxiliaries with Lorenzo Bernal del Mercado as his maestre de campo. Gamboa's force stormed the fortress and after a long fight captured it after setting it afire, and dispersed Paillataru's army killing 200 of them and capturing some others. Following the battle, Pedro Cortez with a party of cazadores harassed the country immediately around the city so well that for a long time the Mapuche could not gather to conduct operations of significance.

In 1568 Paillataru had collected a new army and occupied the heights of Catirai. Immediately, the new governor Melchor Bravo de Saravia marched against the toqui with three hundred Spanish soldiers and a large number of Indian auxiliaries. There Paillataru gave the Spaniards a defeat and the governor escaped with the remnant of his troops to Angol, where he resigned the command of the army, appointing Gamboa as its general. Intimidated by his defeat, he ordered Gamboa to evacuate the fortress of Arauco, leaving large numbers of horses to be captured by the Mapuche.

Paillataru, who had moved from Catirai to destroy the Spanish fort at Quiapo, marched afterward against Canete, which he attempted to besiege. However Gamboa advanced to meet him with all the troops he could raise and in a long bloody battle compelled Paillataru to retreat. Gamboa followed up by invading Araucanian territory, intending to ravage it as they had before but Paillataru with fresh levies returned and compelled Gamboa to retreat.

Paillataru was succeeded on his death by the toqui Paineñamcu, the Mapuche name of the mestizo Alonzo Diaz.

== Sources ==
- Vicente Carvallo y Goyeneche, Descripcion Histórico Geografía del Reino de Chile (Description Historical Geography of the Kingdom of Chile), University of Chile: Document Collections in complete texts: Cronicles (on line in Spanish)(History of Chile 1425-1788)Capítulo LVI, LVIII, LIX.
