= Paillaeco =

Paillaeco was elected Toqui in 1592 in place of Quintuguenu after Quintuguenu's defeat and death. Paillaeco did not think his forces were now sufficient to oppose the Spanish in the open field and decided to draw them into an ambush. The Spanish turned the tables on them drawing his army out of their ambush and destroyed it killing Paillaeco. Paillamachu was elected to succeed him later the same year 1592.

== Sources ==
- The Geographical, Natural, and Civil History of Chili By Don Juan Ignatius Molina, Longman, Hurst, Rees, and Orme, Paternoster-Row, London, 1809
- José Ignacio Víctor Eyzaguirre, Historia eclesiastica: Politica y literaria de Chile, IMPRENTA DEL COMERCIO, VALPARAISO, June 1830 List of Toquis, pg. 162-163, 498-500.
