= Marihueñu =

Coordinates: 37.1170°S 73.1330°W

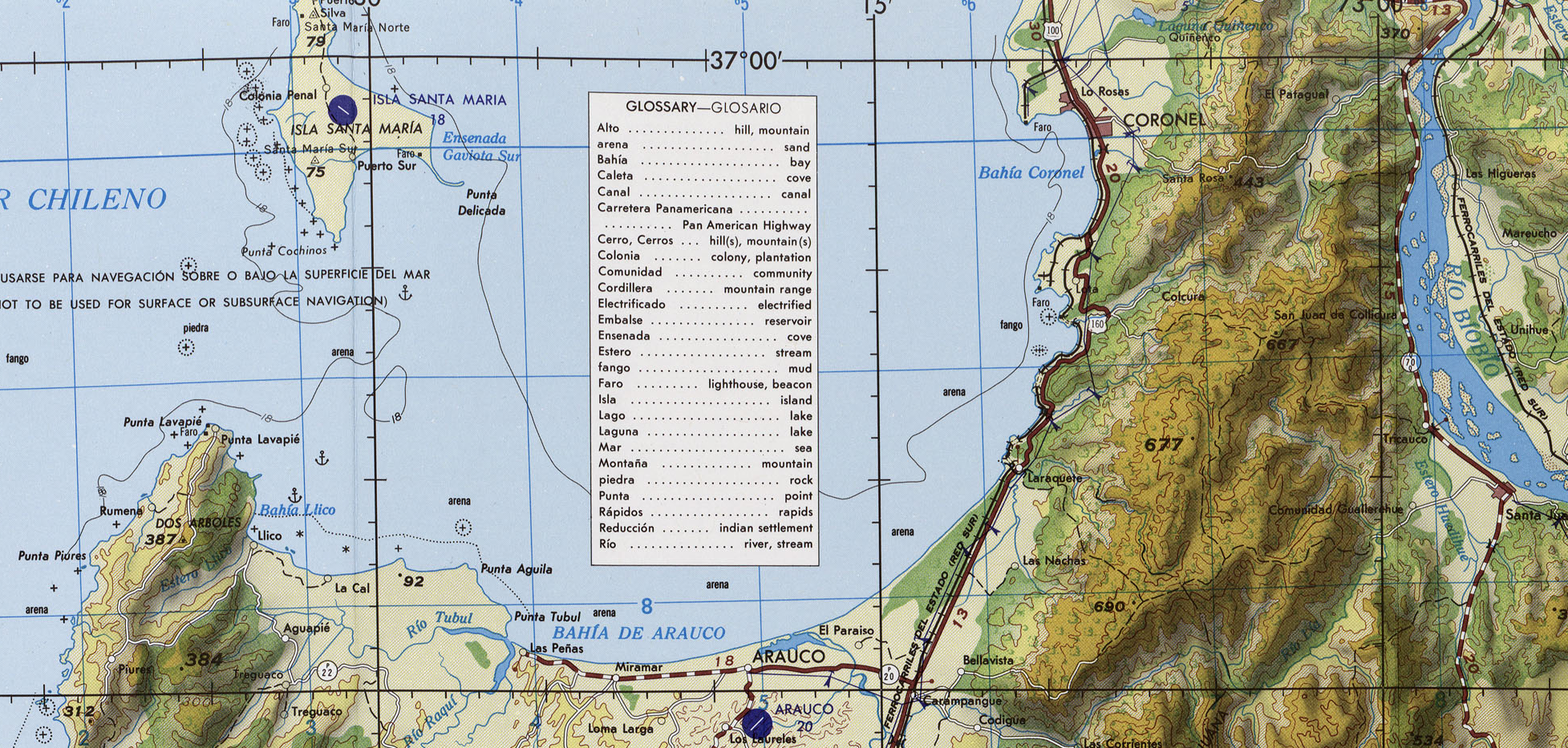
Bay of Arauco, on the right side, the commune of Lota

Marihueñu or Marigueno is a large hill in the Cordillera de Nahuelbuta near the coast in the Lota commune of the Bío Bío Region of southern Chile. Its name is from the Mapudungun mari, "ten" and huenu, "heights". This height was within the Moluche aillarehue of Marigueno that lay between the Pacific Ocean and the lower reaches of the Biobío River north of the aillarehues of Arauco and Catirai. It was an important location during the Arauco War because it overlooked the coastal route to Araucanía from Concepción. The place is located on the coast to the south of Lota between Lota and Laraquete. It is bounded to the north by the valley of Colcura and to the south by the valley of Chivilingo.

These heights were the site of the 1554 Battle of Marihueñu, the victory of Lautaro over Governor Francisco de Villagra. For this reason it became known to the Spanish as the "Cuesta de Víllagra" (Hill of Víllagra) or "Cerro Villagrán" (Villagrán Hill). It was the site of several other similar battles before Alonso de Sotomayor built a fort on the heights in 1589. Later the Moluche captured the fort and in another battle in 1591 Governor Sotomayor captured the fort at its summit and killed the Toqui Quintuguenu.

== Sources ==
- Francisco Solano Asta-Buruaga y Cienfuegos, Diccionario geográfico de la República de Chile, SEGUNDA EDICIÓN CORREGIDA Y AUMENTADA, NUEVA YORK, D. APPLETON Y COMPAÑÍA. 1899. Pg. 425-26 Marihueno.
