= Paillamachu =

Toqui (wartime military leader) of the Mapuche from 1592 to 1603

Paillamachu (died 1604), was the Mapuche toqui from 1592 to 1603 in what is now Chile.

Paillamachu replaced the slain Paillaeco, then organized and carried out the great revolt of 1598 that expelled the Spanish from Araucanía south of the Bío Bío River. He was succeeded upon his death by Huenecura in 1604.

== Sources ==
- The Geographical, Natural, and Civil History of Chili By Don Juan Ignatius Molina, Longman, Hurst, Rees, and Orme, Paternoster-Row, London, 1809
- José Ignacio Víctor Eyzaguirre, Historia eclesiastica: Politica y literaria de Chile, IMPRENTA DEL COMERCIO, VALPARAISO, June 1830 List of Toquis, pg. 162-163, 498-500.
