= Cristóbal Suárez de Figueroa =

Spanish historian

Cristóbal Suárez de Figueroa (1571 in Valladolid, Spain – after 1644) was a Spanish writer and jurist.

== Sources ==
- Cristobal Suarez de Figueroa, HECHOS DE DON GARCÍA HURTADO DE MENDOZA, Imprenta Real, Madrid, 1616. Texto preparado por ENRIQUE SUÁREZ FIGAREDO
