= Fort Livén =

Chilean fort

Fort Livén was a fort with a small garrison built by Rodrigo de Quiroga in 1575, in the small valley of Livén, nearby the old city of Santa María Magdalena de Villa Rica. In 1585 it fell to the Mapuche cacique Putaén, who was later killed in it. The fort was later destroyed by his wife Janequeo the famous Mapuche heroine that waged war in that valley against the Spaniards to avenge her husband.

== Sources ==
- Francisco Solano Asta Buruaga y Cienfuegos, Diccionario geográfico de la República de Chile, Segunda Edición Corregida Y Aumentada, Nueva York, D. Appleton Y Compañía. 1899. p. 378 Livén. – Valle
