= Alejo Véliz =

Alejo Véliz may refer to:

- Alejo Véliz (politician) (born 1957), Bolivian politician
- Alejo Véliz (footballer) (born 2003), Argentine footballer
