= Andalién River =

Coordinates: 36°44′22″S 73°00′58″W

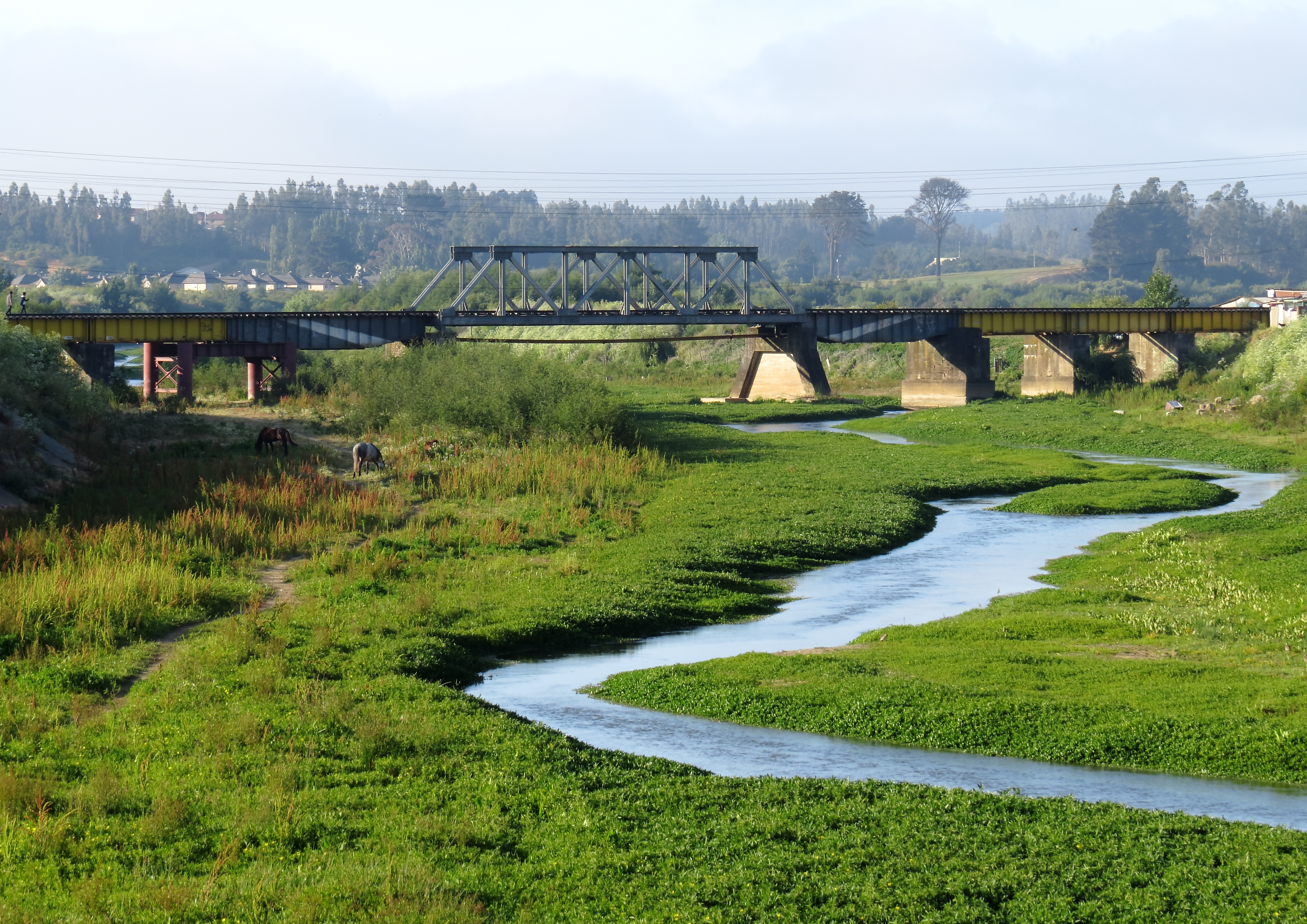
- A railway bridge over the Andalién River

Location
- Countries: Chile

Physical characteristics
- Source
  - location: Cordillera de la Costa
- Mouth
  - location: Pacific Ocean
- Length: 42 kilometres (26 mi).
- Basin size: 780 km^{2} (300 sq mi)
- Discharge
  - average: 10 m^{3}/s (350 cu ft/s)

The Andalién River is a river in the province of Concepción, in the Bío Bío Region of Chile. It drains the western side of Chile's Cordillera de la Costa and has a total length of 42 kilometres (26 mi). It is one of the two rivers that bracket the city of Concepción.

== Course ==
The Andalién River is formed by the union of the Poñén from the north and the Curapalihue from the south in the commune of Florida. It then flows southwest and west, and eventually northwest into the city of Concepción, Chile. After the city of Concepción, it flows north through the former villages (now neighbourhoods) of Andalién and El Rosal, and then the communes of Talcahuano, and Penco. There, on its alluvial plain northeast of Concepción, it forms distributaries, and small lakes, such as the Laguna Negra, before entering the Bay of Concepción.

The Andalién river basin covers approximately 23% of the province of Concepción and also includes part of the municipalities of Penco, Florida, Talcahuano and Tomé.

From its source to the junction of the limits of Talcahuano and Penco, the river crosses a large part of the city of Concepción and flows into the limits of Penco and Talcahuano. The length of the Andalién River is about 36 km.

== See also ==
- Battle of Andalién

== Sources ==
- Asta-Buruaga y Cienfuegos, Francisco Solano (1899). Diccionario geográfico de la República de Chile (second ed.). New York: D. Appleton and Company. pp. 31–32.
- Castillo, Edilia Jaque (2008). "Geomorfología de la cuenca del río Andalién, Chile". Revista Geográfica (in Spanish) (143): 97–116. JSTOR 40996764.
