= Cayancura =

Cayancura, or Cayeucura, was a Mapuche leader native to the region of Marigüenu, chosen as toqui in 1584 to replace the captured Paineñamcu. His one great operation was an attempted siege of the fort at Arauco that failed, leading to his abdication of his office in favor of his son Nangoniel in 1585.
