= Ainavillo =

- Military career
- Allegiance: Mapuche
- Branch: Army
- Rank: Toqui
- Conflicts: Battle of Andalien

Ainavillo, Aynabillo, Aillavilu or Aillavilú, (in Mapudungun, ailla, nine and filu, snake) was the toqui of the Mapuche army from the provinces of "Ñuble, Itata, Renoguelen, Guachimavida, Marcande, Gualqui, Penco and Talcahuano."

They tried to stop Pedro de Valdivia from invading their lands in 1550. He led about twenty thousand warriors in the surprise night attack on Valdivia's camp in the Battle of Andalien.
After his defeat in that battle he gathered more warriors from the allied regions of Arauco and Tucapel, south of the Bio-Bio River, for an attack on Valdivia's newly constructed fort of Concepcion at what is now Penco. He led an army of sixty thousand warriors in three divisions against the fort in the Battle of Penco. Ainavillo's command that had been previously defeated at Andalien, was recognized by the Spaniards and Valdivia picked it out for a vigorous charge by all their cavalry following a softening up by volleys of their firearms. It was broken at the first onslaught and fled with the Spanish in pursuit, followed by the retreat of the other two divisions of the Mapuche upon seeing the spectacle.

== Sources ==
- Jerónimo de Vivar, Crónica y relación copiosa y verdadera de los reinos de Chile (Chronicle and abundant and true relation of the kingdoms of Chile) ARTEHISTORIA REVISTA DIGITAL; Crónicas de América (on line in Spanish) Capítulos XCV and XCVII
- Pedro Mariño de Lobera, Crónica del Reino de Chile, escrita por el capitán Pedro Mariño de Lobera....reducido a nuevo método y estilo por el Padre Bartolomé de Escobar. Edición digital a partir de Crónicas del Reino de Chile Madrid, Atlas, 1960, pp. 227-562, (Biblioteca de Autores Españoles; 569-575). Biblioteca Virtual Miguel de Cervantes (on line in Spanish) Capítulo XXXI
