= Alejo Lascano Bahamonde =

Ecuadorian physician (1840–1904)

- Born: 17 July 1840; Jipijapa, Manabí Province, Ecuador
- Died: 3 December 1904 (aged 64); Guayaquil, Ecuador
- Education: Sorbonne University
- Known for: Founder of the Faculty of Medicine at the University of Guayaquil, pioneer of obstetrics in Ecuador
- Scientific career
- Fields: Surgery, medical education

Alejo Lascano Bahamonde (17 July 1840 – 3 December 1904) was an Ecuadorian surgeon, medical educator, and philanthropist.

He was the founding dean of the Faculty of Medicine at the University of Guayaquil and a pioneering figure in the modernization of public health in Ecuador.

== Early life and education ==
Lascano was born on 17 July 1840 in Jipijapa, Manabí Province, to José Francisco Lascano, a straw‑hat exporter, and Josefa Bahamonde Gracés, both affluent Guayaquileños. His family relocated to Guayaquil during his early childhood. He attended Colegio San Vicente del Guayas, then moved to Quito to complete his bachillerato in philosophy in 1856.

On 1 February 1857, he departed for Paris to enroll at the Faculty of Medicine, trained at the Laugier Clinic, and earned his Doctorate in Medicine and Surgery on 17 July 1864, with his thesis praised by Professor Jacoub.

== Medical career ==
Upon returning to Ecuador in mid-1864, Lascano briefly practiced in Quito, and officially joined the Central University of Ecuador's medical faculty in Quito on 18 July 1866. In 1867, seeing the lack of a medical school in Guayaquil, he founded the Facultad de Medicina del Guayas, personally funding deficits and serving as its first dean. In 1869, President Gabriel García Moreno appointed him Médico Vitalicio at the Civil Hospital of Guayaquil, where he established a maternity ward and pharmacy, often with his own financial support. He was also the first physician in Ecuador to use the Pagot obstetric forceps.

Lascano created numerous pharmaceutical formulas including an antidiphtheric "Agua de San Juan de Dios" and was known for charitable medical services in Jipijapa.

== Academic leadership ==
As head of the new medical school, Lascano served as dean and was designated rector in 1877, launching courses on 15 October 1877. From 1893 to 1898, he again served as rector of the University of Guayaquil, overseeing construction of a new campus building funded partially by the government and supplemented by personal contributions. Reception of 12,000 sucres from President Luis Cordero and additional private funds enabled the project's completion and inauguration in December 1898.

He founded the Faculty of Pharmacy in 1895, instituted faculty selection via competitive examinations, donated books to the university library, and served as honorary president of the Asociación‑Escuela de Medicina.

== Public service and honors ==
Lascano was elected senator for the provinces of Manabí and Esmeraldas, though professional duties prevented active participation. In 1900, the Guayaquil Municipal Council named a street in his honor ("Calle Lascano"). The Liberal President Eloy Alfaro chose him as godfather to his son Colón Eloy after Lascano saved the boy’s life.

Lascano never married and had no children. According to contemporary biographical sources, most of his estate was left to his sister, Josefa Zoila Rosario Lascano Bahamonde (1850–1919), who was married to merchant and landowner Antonio Madinya Vilasendra (1837–1920), linking his legacy to the prominent Madinyá family.

== Death and legacy ==
Afflicted by chronic stomach cancer and diabetes, Lascano died in Guayaquil on 3 December 1904 at age 64. His funeral drew large crowds of doctors, students, and civic leaders; eulogies were delivered by figures including Dr. Teófilo N. Fuentes and student Alberto Hidalgo. He was buried in a mausoleum in the General Cemetery of Guayaquil, and a bronze bust was placed at the old medical school entrance.

Today, his legacy lives on: the Faculty of Medicine at the University of Guayaquil bears his name, as do streets in Guayaquil, the Unidad Educativa Alejo Lascano in Jipijapa, and a parish in Paján.

== See also ==
- History of medicine in Ecuador
