= Paineñamcu =

Paineñamcu or Paynenancu or Alonso Diaz, was the Mapuche toqui from 1574 to 1584. Alonso Diaz was a mestizo Spanish soldier offended because the Governor of Chile did not promote him to the officer rank of alféres, who subsequently went over to the Mapuche in 1572. He took the Mapuche name of Paineñamcu and because of his military skills was elected toqui in 1574 following the death of Paillataru.

He was captured in battle in 1584 and saved his life when he betrayed to his captors the location of a renegade Spaniard and a mulato that were leaders in the Mapuche army. He was executed later that same year in Santiago, Chile when the Spanish believed he was communicating with the rebellious Mapuche. Cayancaru succeeded him as toqui after his capture.

== Sources ==
- Pedro Mariño de Lobera, Crónica del Reino de Chile, escrita por el capitán Pedro Mariño de Lobera....reducido a nuevo método y estilo por el Padre Bartolomé de Escobar. Edición digital a partir de Crónicas del Reino de Chile Madrid, Atlas, 1960, pp. 227-562, (Biblioteca de Autores Españoles; 569-575). Biblioteca Virtual Miguel de Cervantes (on line in Spanish) Libro tercero, Parte tercera, Capítulo XXXII
- Diego de Rosales, “Historia General del Reino de Chile”, Flandes Indiano, 3 tomos. Valparaíso 1877 - 1878.
  - Historia general de el Reyno de Chile: Flandes Indiano Vol. 2 Capítulo XLV, XLIX, LI, LII.
- Vicente Carvallo y Goyeneche, Descripcion Histórico Geografía del Reino de Chile (Description Historical Geography of the Kingdom of Chile), University of Chile: Document Collections in complete texts: Cronicles (on line in Spanish)(History of Chile 1425-1788) Tomo I, Capítulo LX, LXII, LXIV, LXVII, LXVIII.
