= Michimalonco =

16th-century indigenous Chilean chief

Michima Lonco
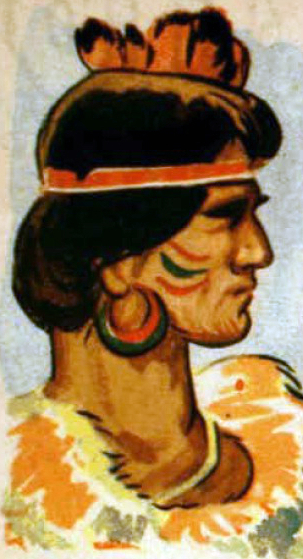
- Born: c. 1500; Aconcagua valley
- Died: c. 1550; Araucanía
- Military career
- Allegiance: Mapuche people
- Branch: Picunche people
- Rank: Toqui
- Conflicts: Arauco War

Michima Lonco (c. 1500 – c. 1550) (lonco meaning "head" or "chief" in Mapudungun) was a Mapuche chief who ruled as an independent sovereign over the territory of the Aconcagua, Mapocho and Maipo valleys. He freed the Picunche (northern mapuches) from Inca rule and he put up tenacious resistance to the conquest of their territories by the Spanish Empire. He presented himself to the Spaniards, naked and covered by a black pigmentation.

== Against Inca rule ==
He was invested as curaca along with his brother Trangolonco. Both ruled over a good part of the Aconcagua valley as local chiefs, under the authority of the Inca governor Quilicanta. in 1533 it welcomed the first Spaniard to arrive in the central area of current Chilean territory, Gonzalo Calvo de Barrientos, who had abandoned the viceroyalty of Peru insulted by Francisco Pizarro, who had him flogged and plucked as punishment for theft. After receiving confirmation of the fall of the Inca Empire from him, Michimalonco faced off against the governor Quilicanta and against the loncos who continued to serve the Inca empire, with the aim of becoming independent from Inca rule. He appointed Barrientos as general of his army and he taught them Spanish war tactics. Michimalonco manages to defeat Naglonco, thus taking over the entire Maipo valley. Later, after the arrival and departure of the Spanish Diego de Almagro, Michimalonco confronts and expels Quilicanta, who escapes, a fact that restores the Picunche independence with Michimalonco as their ruler.

== Spanish invasion ==
In 1540, the Spaniards under the command of Pedro de Valdivia entered Picunche territory, Michimaloco goes out to meet him with his army and the battle of the Mapocho River takes place, which Michimalonco loses. While Valdivia felt that its entrenchment was definitive in the region, Michimalonco thought that its previous defeat would be avenged with the expulsion of the Europeans. To carry out what he wanted, he gathered a large force in the hills of Chillox to attack Spanish army. But their plan was discovered by the Spanish, who prepared to make a surprise attack on the Mapuche camp. Thus, in January 1541, the Battle of Aconcagua took place, which frustrated Michimalonco's plans and forced him to retreat to his fortress of Paidahuén. This allowed the Spanish to obtain a time of peace that would allow them to establish themselves in the region.

On February 12, 1541, Valdivia officially founded the city of Santiago de Nueva Extremadura in honor of the Apostle Santiago, patron saint of Spain. As soon as he founded Santiago, Pedro de Valdivia headed towards the sector where the current city of Los Andes is located to finish off Michimalonco, in the battle of Paidahuén where Michimalonco was defeated and captured and his fortress of Paidahuén was destroyed. To achieve his liberation, he offered the conquerors the location of the Marga Marga gold mines in exchange for his freedom and that of his men. The Spanish freed them and kept the gold mines. It was the first time they found gold in Chile.

Aguirre and Villagrán visit the old gold pans and establish their importance. Michimalonco, perforce, supplies workers to work them. The very poor conditions in which this work is carried out, in addition to the insatiable thirst for gold of the Spanish, generates severe discontent among the Mapuches.

== Resistance against the Spanish ==
Michimalonco's brother, Trangolonco, revolted in Quillota and headed to the Spanish settlement of Marga Marga where after a battle of Marga Marga, killed the Spanish, African slaves and Peruvian Indians, with only Gonzalo de los Ríos escaping with an African slave. Then he went to the settlement of Concón where after winning the battle of Concón he also burned a bridge under construction at the mouth of the Aconcagua river. With tireless tenacity, Trangolonco visited all his allies in the Aconcagua and Maipo valleys, managing to gather a total of 10,000 warriors. Then he addressed the Mapuches of Cachapoal and informed them about the events, giving them vibrant speeches, through which he exhorted them to continue the work of liberation begun with the expulsion of the Inca troops from the country. It found a wide echo. In that valley another army was organized, which numbered 16,000 warriors. It was agreed to surround Santiago and take the city by assault in the coming spring. Thus a general uprising was unleashed under the orders of Michimalonco that included the valleys of Aconcagua, Maipo and Cachapoal.

Michimalonco, as general leader (toqui) of the Mapuches, led an assault against the newly founded city of Santiago del Nuevo Extremo on September 11, 1541 that ended in the Destruction of Santiago. The number of combatants was about 5,000-10,000 on the part of the Mapuches and 55 soldiers, plus 5,000 auxiliary yanaconas, on the part of the Spanish. The defense of the outnumbered town was led by Inés de Suárez, a female conquistador, while commander Pedro de Valdivia was elsewhere. Almost all of the town was destroyed when Suárez decapitated one of the caciques herself and had the rest decapitated to surprise the natives. The natives were then driven off by the Spanish.

After a large number of confrontations between the hosts of Valdivia and those of Michimalonco, at the end of 1543 the Spanish managed to finish controlling the valleys of Cachapoal, Maipo and Aconcagua with the conquest by Pedro de Valdivia of three forts that Michimalonco maintained in the Andean mountain range of the Aconcagua River, which causes the withdrawal of Michimalonco's forces towards the north.

In 1544 Michimalonco headed to the Limarí River valley to cut off land communications between Chile and Peru for the Spanish. Michimalonco becomes strong in this sector with its Mapuche contingent added to the contingent of its Diaguita allies. After some victories against the Spanish advances, Pedro de Valdivia was forced to command his army himself and go to sustain the battle of Limarí, where the Mapuche-Diaguita hosts were defeated and Pedro de Valdivia sent Juan Bohón to found the City of La Serena at the mouth of the Elqui River.

== Exile and signing of peace ==
After fighting the Spaniards, dejected by the continuous setbacks his cause was experiencing, he left the country and, crossing the Andes, sought refuge in Cuyo, still in the power of the Diaguitas. There he hid for a couple of years but feeling homesick he came back to his lands. He gathered his former comrades-in-arms and ordered them to lay down their weapons and live in peace with the Spaniards, "who in the end," he told them, "we already know that as much as they are brave and brave in war, they are meek and affable in peace.” He then paid respect and obedience to Governor Pedro de Valdivia, offering himself in his service, and asked his forgiveness for past alterations. He accompanied these words with about 200 pounds of very fine gold and "a quantity of cattle and other things." Valdivia gratefully reciprocated the gifts and good intentions of Michimalonco, willingly accepting his offer as long as the Picunche people did not oppose the evangelizing action of the missionaries, submitting to the encomienda regime and contribute with labor to the exploitation of gold mines and placers. The toqui picunche agreed to everything, thus sealing peace between both peoples. Then Michimalonco allied his forces with the Spaniards and went to fight the Araucanian Mapuches on the south. Once Michimalonco was fighting with his weichafes against the Mapuche of Arauco, he conspired to join them and betray the Spaniards, but when he was about to execute his plan, he was discovered and executed by Jerónimo de Alderete.

== Sources ==
- Jerónimo de Vivar, Crónica y relación copiosa y verdadera de los reinos de Chile (Chronicle and abundant and true relation of the kingdoms of Chile) ARTEHISTORIA REVISTA DIGITAL; Crónicas de América (on line in Spanish)
