= Espíritu Santo (fort) =

Spanish fortress and town

Coordinates: 37.4603°S 72.6868°W

Espíritu Santo was a Spanish fortress that existed a little to the north of what is now the Nacimiento commune of Bío Bío Province, Bio-Bio Region of Chile. It was on the left bank of the Bio Bio River immediately below its confluence with the Tavolevo River. Built in 1585 by the Governor Alonso de Sotomayor for defense of the valley of Catiray and was in correspondence with fort Santísima Trinidad, on the opposite shore of the Bio Bio. It was abandoned and destroyed by the year of 1600.

== Sources ==
- Francisco Solano Asta-Buruaga y Cienfuegos, Diccionario geográfico de la República de Chile, D. Appleton y Compania, Nueva York, 1899, pg. 269
