= Battle of La Albarrada =

1858 battle of the Mexican Reform War

Date	24 December 1858
Location	Colony of La Albarrada, Colima City, Colima
Result	Conservative victory

Belligerents
Liberals	Conservatives

The Battle of La Albarrada took place on 24 December 1858 in La Albarrada, at the time a colony of the city of Colima (in the state of Colima, Mexico), between elements of the liberal army during the War of Reform. The conservative side under General Miguel Miramón decisively defeated the Juarist (liberal) forces, despite being outnumbered.
