= Toqui =

Mapuche leader in times of war

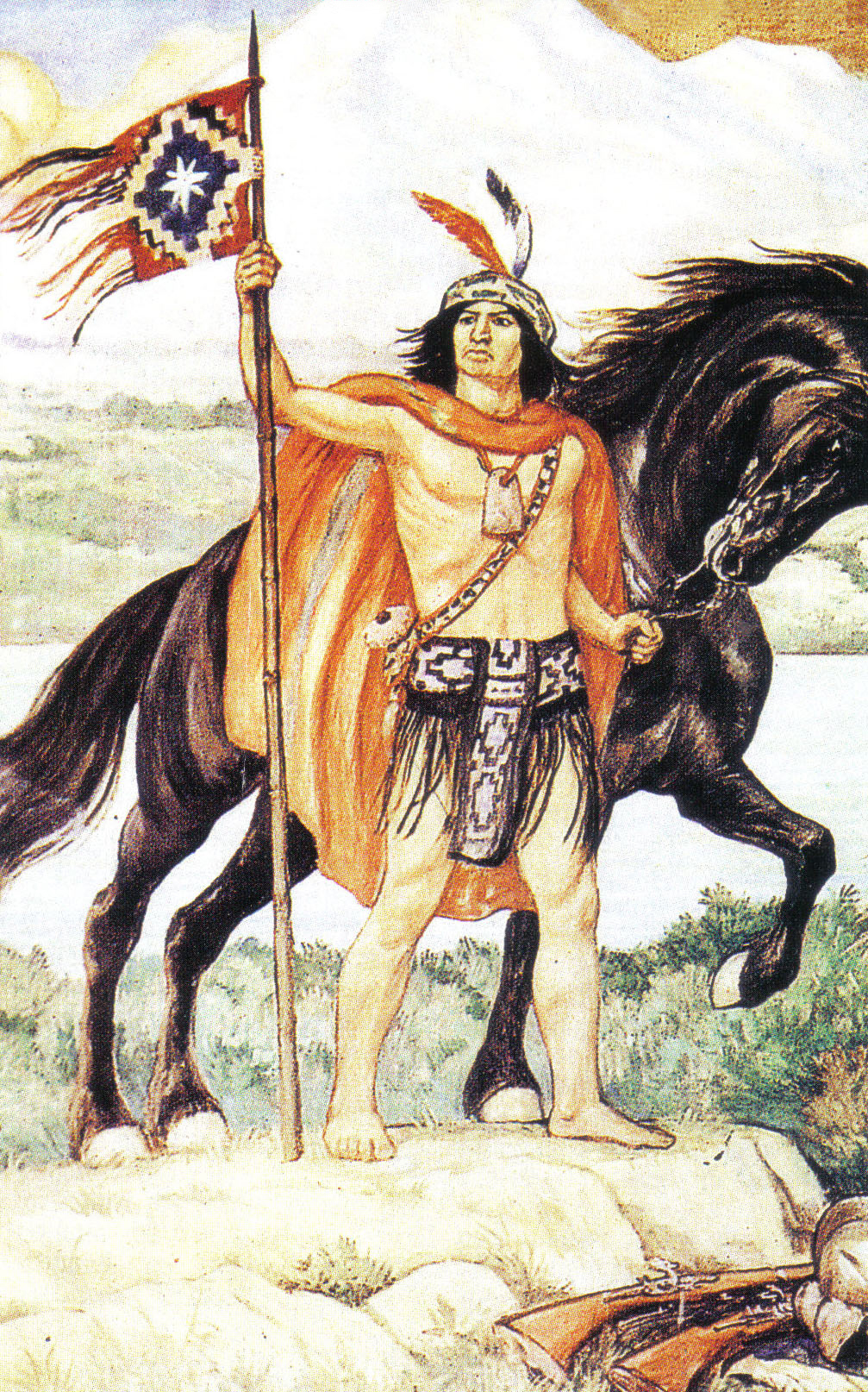
Toqui Lautaro, painting by Pedro Subercaseaux.

Toqui (or Toki) (Mapudungun for axe or axe-bearer) is a title conferred by the Mapuche (an indigenous Chilean and Argentinian people) on those chosen as leaders during times of war. The toqui is chosen in an assembly or parliament (coyag) of the chieftains (loncos) of various clans (Rehues) or confederation of clans (Aillarehues), allied during the war at hand. The toqui commanded strict obedience of all the warriors and their loncos during the war, would organize them into units and appoint leaders over them. This command would continue until the toqui was killed, abdicated (Cayancaru), was deposed in another parliament (as in the case of Lincoyan, for poor leadership), or upon completion of the war for which he was chosen.

Some of the more famous Toqui in the Arauco War with the Spanish introduced tactical innovations. For example, Michimalonco incorporated Spanish war tactics learned from Gonzalo Calvo de Barrientos, which he used to expel Inca rule from his lands by overthrowing the last Inca governor, Quilicanta. Lautaro introduced infantry tactics to defeat horsemen and create the first mapuche cavalry corps. Lemucaguin was the first Toqui to use firearms and artillery in battle. Nongoniel was the first Toqui to use shock cavalry, bolas cavalry and cavalry archers with the Mapuche army. Cadeguala was the first to successfully use Mapuche cavalry to defeat Spanish cavalry in battle. Anganamón was the first to mount his infantry to keep up with his fast-moving cavalry. Lientur pioneered the tactic of numerous and rapid malóns into Spanish territory.

The greatest of the Toqui was the older Paillamachu, who developed the strategy, patiently organized and trained his forces and then with his two younger Vice Toqui, Pelantaro and Millacolquin, carried out the Great Revolt of 1598–1604 which finally expelled the Spanish from Araucania.

== List of Mapuche Toquis ==
Probable standard of the Toqui, based on representations.

The following Mapuche leaders were at some time named as toquis:

- Michimalonco 1540-1544 ††
- Malloquete 1546 †
- Ainavillo, Aynabillo or Aillavilú 1550 †
- Lincoyan 1551–1553
- Caupolicán 1553–1558 ††
  - Lautaro Vice Toqui 1553–1557 †
- Turcupichun 1557–1558 ††
- Lemucaguin or Caupolicán the younger 1558 †
- Illangulién, Quiromanite, Queupulien or Antiguenu 1559–1564 †
  - Millalelmo or Millarelmo or Antunecul 1562–1570
  - Loble or Lig-lemu or Lillemu Vice Toqui 1563–1565
- Paillataru 1564–1574
  - Llanganabal 1569
- Paineñamcu or Paynenancu, originally Alonso Diaz 1574–1584 ††
- Cayancaru or Cayeucura 1584
- Nongoniel or Mangolien 1585 †
- Cadeguala or Cadiguala 1585–1586 †
- Guanoalca or Huenualca 1586–1590
- Quintuguenu 1591 †
- Paillaeco 1592 †
- Paillamachu 1592–1603
  - Pelantaro Vice Toqui
  - Millacolquin Vice Toqui
- Huenecura or Huenencura 1604–1610
- Aillavilu, Aillavilú II, Aillavilu Segundo 1610–1612
- Anganamón, Ancanamon or Ancanamun 1612–1613
- Loncothegua 1613–1620
- Lientur 1621–1625
  - Levipillan Vice Toqui
- Butapichón or Butapichún 1625–1631
- Quepuantú or Quempuante 1631–1632 †
- Butapichón or Butapichún 1632–1634
- Huenucalquin 1634–1635 †
- Curanteo 1635 †
- Curimilla 1635–1639 †
- Lincopinchon 1640–1641
- Clentaru 1655
- Mestizo Alejo or Ñancú 1656–1661 @
- Misqui 1661–1663 †
- Colicheuque 1663 †
- Udalevi 1664–1665 †
  - Calbuñancü vice toqui 1664–1665 †
- Ayllicuriche or Huaillacuriche 1672–1673 †
- Millalpal or Millapán 1692–1694
- Vilumilla 1722–1726
- Curiñancu 1766–1774
  - Lebian Vice Toqui

† Killed in battle or †† executed for rebellion or @ assassinated.

== Sources ==
- Juan Ignatius Molina, The Geographical, Natural, and Civil History of Chili, Vol II., Longman, Hurst, Rees, and Orme, London, 1809
- José Ignacio Víctor Eyzaguirre, Historia eclesiastica: Politica y literaria de Chile, IMPRENTA DEL COMERCIO, VALPARAISO, June 1830 List of Toquis, pg. 162–163, 498–500.
