= Santísima Trinidad (fort) =

Santísima Trinidad or Most Holy Trinity was a fortress in the Captaincy General of Chile that existed on the north shore of the Bio-Bio River in what is now the Bío Bío Province. It was built directly across the river from Fort Espíritu Santo by the Royal Governor of Chile Alonso de Sotomayor in 1585. It was abandoned by the same governor in 1591 and destroyed by the Indians in the great rising of the Mapuche that followed the death of Governor Martín García Óñez de Loyola. It was constructed again in 1603 by Governor Alonso de Ribera but it disappeared few years later.

== Sources ==
- Francisco Solano Asta-Buruaga y Cienfuegos, Diccionario geográfico de la República de Chile, D. Appleton y Compania, Nueva York, 1899 pg.842
