= La Frontera (Chile) =

Geographical region of Chile

Coordinates: 34°41′S 71°02′W

La Frontera in Chile is the region around the Bío Bío River, or the whole area between it and the Toltén River. The use of this latter definition is largely coterminous with the historical usage of Araucanía. The term was coined during the period when the region was the frontier of the Captaincy General of Chile, then a part of the Spanish Empire and later the Republic of Chile, with the Mapuche people inhabiting the Araucanía following their revolt in 1598. Subsequently, the Spanish Empire established a system of forts between the Bío Bío River and the Itata River, as well as some within the Araucanía. This system continued through the 18th century and into the 19th century.

== Forts and settlements of La Frontera ==
The first fortress rebuilt following the 1599 destruction of the forts in Catirai and its city Santa Cruz de Coya, the cities of Santa María la Blanca de Valdivia, San Andrés de Los Infantes and San Bartolomé de Chillán y Gamboa, was the reconstruction of the city of Chillán by the interim Governor Francisco de Quiñónez.

=== 17th century ===
In 1601 Alonso de Ribera built Fort Talcahuano to defend remaining Spanish settlements near Concepción and Fort Lonquén on the Lonquén River to secure estancias that provided food to the army.

In 1602 Ribera rebuilt the small Fort Colcura and Fort Guanaraque and built a new fort, Santa Fe near the confluence of the Bio Bio and Vergara Rivers. On the coast Ribera sent captain Francisco Hernández Ortiz to establish a fort Valdivia on the site of the ruined city but it had to be abandoned by the starving remnant of its garrison after a terrible two-year siege.

In 1603 Ribera built Fort Chepe and Fort San Pedro to cover the crossing at the mouth of the Bio Bio River. He rebuilt San Felipe de Araucan and Santa Margarita de Austria on the coast between the aillarehues of Arauco and Tucapel and a fort at Tucapel and Paicavi on the Paicavi River. Also in the same year to the east along the Bio Bio River facing the aillarehues of Catirai and Purén, he rebuilt Santa Lucia de Yumbel and built the forts of Nuestra Señora de la Buena Esperanza, San Rosendo, Nuestra de Senora de Halle, Nacimiento de Nuestro Señor and San Francisco de Borja. The refugees from the abandoned city of Osorno under captain Francisco Hernández founded Fort Calbuco on a channel between the Reloncaví Sound and the Gulf of Ancud.

In 1606, Alonso García de Ramón built Fort San Ignacio de la Redención near Boroa but it was abandoned soon after the ambush of most of its garrison.

In 1607 García de Ramón rebuilt Fort Purén and San Jerónimo de Millapoa but as a result of a peace agreement with the Moluche of Catirai he soon dismantled the later.

In 1611 Luis Merlo de la Fuente built fort San Luis de Angol a little to the south of the old city of Angol.

In 1613 Alonso de Ribera built Fort Virguenco in the upper part of the Rehue River and rebuilt the fort at Puren again.

In 1621, Cristóbal de la Cerda y Sotomayor rebuilt the fort of Yumbel the same year it was destroyed. He also built fort San Cristóbal de La Paz and fortified the town around the fort San Bartolomé de Chillán.

In 1622, Pedro Osores de Ulloa built Fort Negrete.

8 March 1626, Luis Fernandez de Cordova established Santa Juana de Guadalcazar.

In 1637, Francisco Laso de la Vega established fort San Francisco de la Vega near the ruined site of the city of Angol, abandoning fort San Luis de Angol.

In 1641, all the Spanish forts south of the Bio Bio were abandoned under the terms of the Peace of Quilín.

In 1647, Martín de Mujica y Buitrón as a result of the Parliament of Quilín (1647) was able to reestablish forts at Valdivia, Santa Juana in 1648, and at Boroa in 1649.

In 1657 Pedro Porter Casanate restored the city of San Bartolomé de Chillán following its destruction at the beginning of the Mapuche Insurrection of 1655. He also built forts San Rafael de Coelemu and San Fabián de Conueo northeast of Concepcion. Meanwhile, captain Alonso de Cordova y Figueroa built Fort Tolpán at the confluence of the Renaico and Vergara Rivers.

In 1661 Governor Porter Casanate built fort San Miguel Arcángel de Colcura near modern Lota and a fort at Talcamávida.

In 1662 Ángel de Peredo established a new city of Santa Maria de Guadalupe and repopulated Arauco lost in 1655.

In 1663 Paredo rebuilt fort San Cristóbal de La Paz.

In 1665 Francisco de Meneses Brito established fort San Carlos de Virhuenco on the upper Rehue River and rebuilt forts Nacimiento de Nuestro Señor and Puren.

In 1666 Meneses built fort Santa Fe and Fort de la Encarnación in Repucura. He also rebuilt San Carlos de Austria de Yumbel.

In 1693 Tomás Marín de Poveda rebuilt fort Buena Esperanza de Rere.

In 1694 Marín de Poveda restored Fort de la Encarnación and a Mission in Repucura.

In 1695 Marín de Poveda built fort Santo Tomás de Colhué.

=== 18th century ===
In 1724 Gabriel Cano de Aponte rebuilt forts Nacimiento, Santa Juana de Guadalcázar and Santo Tomás de Colhué. He transferred from Arauco Province the garrison and inhabitants of Plaza de San Diego de Tucapel to the bank of the Laja River near the Andes where a new fort of the same name was built.

In 1739, José Antonio Manso de Velasco founded fort Nuestra Señora de Los Ángeles.

In 1749 fort Nacimiento was moved to the present site of the modern town of Nacimiento.

In 1756, Manuel de Amat y Juniet founded fort Santa Bárbara and established the towns of San Rafael de Talcamavida and San Juan Bautista de Gualqui

In 1757 Amat y Juniet made Nacimiento a town.

In 1764 Antonio de Guill y Gonzaga established Fort Repucura and a mission at Repucura once again.

In 1777, the then military engineer Ambrosio O' Higgins, constructed for Agustín de Jáuregui y Aldecoa, a fort San Agustín de Mesamávida.

In 1788 Governor Ambrosio O'Higgins built Fort Príncipe Carlos on the Duqueco River.

In 1792 the forces of Governor Ambrosio O'Higgins under Tomás de Figueroa took possession of the site of the city of Osorno ruined in 1602, and constructed a fort there. O'Higgins reestablished it as a city in 1796.

== See also ==
- Arauco War
- Banditry in Chile
- Guerra a muerte

== Sources ==
- Diego de Rosales, Historia General del Reino de Chile, Flandes Indiano, 3 tomos. Valparaíso 1877–1878.
  - Historia general de el Reyno de Chile: Flandes Indiano Vol. 2 Libro V La Ruina de las Siete Ciudades
- Crescente Errázuriz, Seis años de la historia de Chile: 23 de diciembre de 1598- 9 de abril de 1605: memoria histórica, Impr. Nacional, Sanitiago de Chile, 1881.
- Atlas de Historia de Chile, Editorial Universitaria, ISBN 956-11-1776-2 pp. 54–55
- Francisco Solano Asta-Buruaga y Cienfuegos, Diccionario geográfico de la República de Chile, D. Appleton y Compania, Nueva York, 1899
