= Polygamy in Mapuche culture =

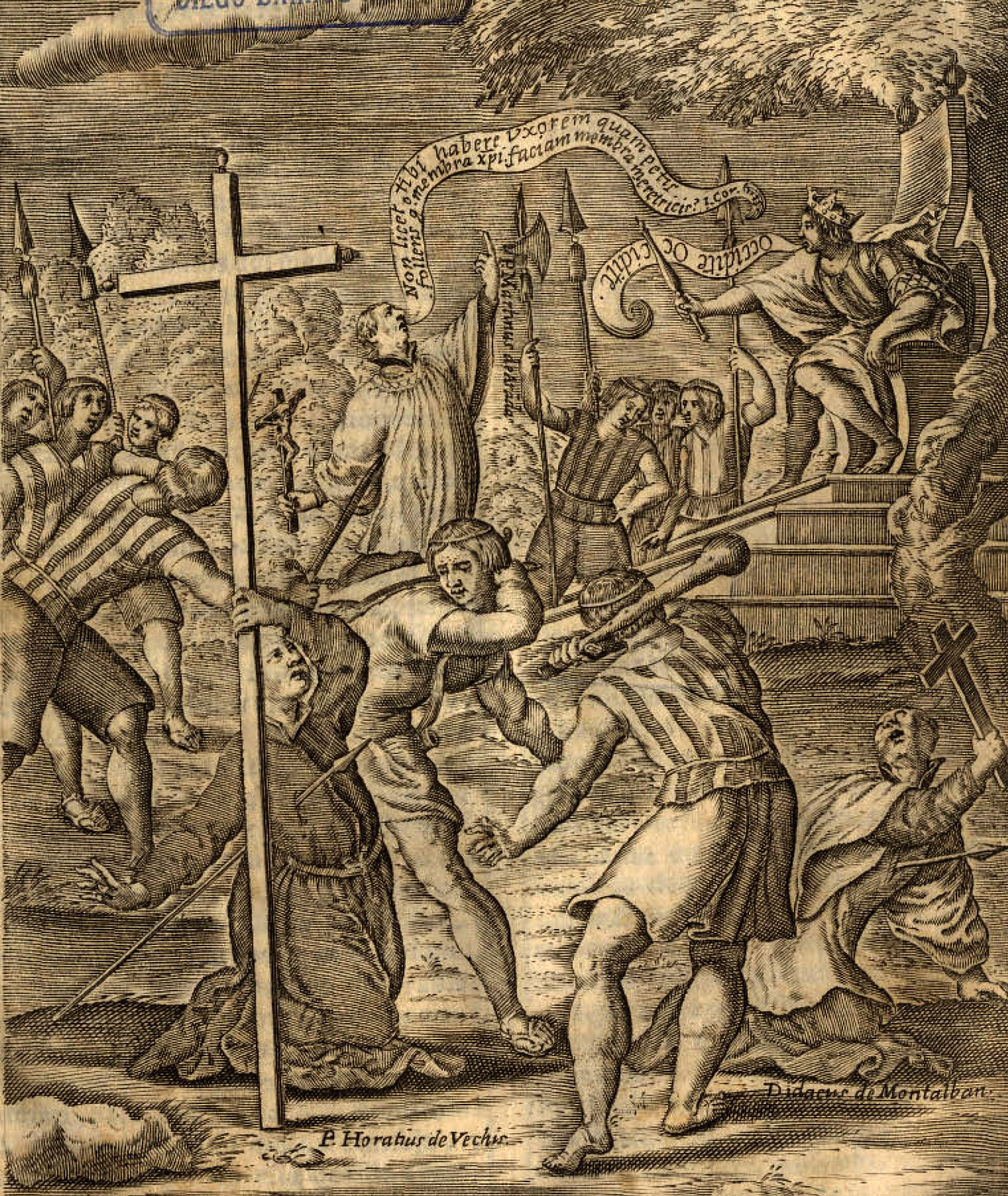
Depiction of the ambush of the Martyrs of Elicura, who were slain in an incident triggered by the conflict between the Mapuche and Spanish settlers on the matter of polygamy.

Among Chile's indigenous Mapuche people, there are those that practice traditional polygamy. In modern Chile polygamy has no legal recognition. This puts women whose marriages to their husbands are not legally recognized at a disadvantage in relation to the legal wife who is, in terms of securing inheritance. Polygamy is much less common today in comparison with the time preceding the Occupation of Araucanía (1861–1883), when the traditional Mapuche homeland was brought under control of the Chilean government. It survives as a chiefly rural practice, but has also been reported in the low-income peripheral communities of Santiago. Wives who share the same husband are often relatives, such as sisters, who live in the same community. According to hearsay, polyandry among the Mapuche is reputed to exist at least historically, in which case the husbands may have been brothers, but no documentation exists attesting to this phenomenon. It is also in contradiction to the renewal of the warrior ethos (weichan) promoted by militant Mapuche organizations such as Coordinadora Arauco-Malleco.

== History ==
Prior to the arrival of the Spanish in the early 16th century, the practice of polygamy by the Mapuche people of South America’s Southern Cone region was a firmly rooted tradition. This brought about increasing tensions in Colonial Chile as polygamy was considered a sin according to the Catholic doctrine of the settlers. Father Luis de Valdivia believed that peace and understanding between the Mapuche and Spanish was possible and sought to accomplish this through his policy of Defensive War, which after lobbying superiors in Spain and Rome, he was permitted to implement in 1612. Nevertheless, at the Parliament of Paicaví, held between representatives of Spanish settlers and Mapuche tribes that same year, Valdivia ordered the detainment of the two wives and daughters of a toqui, Anganamón, on the basis of protecting them from polygamy. Historian Jorge Pinto Rodríguez described this act as "suicidal"; according to José Bengoa, the Mapuche were willing to negotiate with the Spanish on Christian proselytization and baptism, but that debate on polygamy was out of the question. Later in 1612, on December 9, Valdivia dispatched a party led by Father Horacio Vechi, one of the first Italian proselytizers of Christianity in Chile, on a missionary journey inland, to be escorted along the way by local chieftains. On the morning of December 14, Anganamón accompanied by Ynavilu, a Mapuche chieftain, ambushed and killed the traveling Jesuits and their five Mapuche escorts in retaliation for Valdivia taking his wives and daughters. The slain party came to be known as the "Martyrs of Elicura."

Polygamy occupied an important role in Mapuche society during their armed rebellion against the Spanish colonial government, then later during independent Chile's military pacification of Araucanía, where rules of marriage were influenced by these conflicts. (Note: Chronicler Alonso González de Nájera wrote that during the Destruction of the Seven Cities, Mapuches killed more than 3,000 Spaniards, and took over 500 women as captives. While some of these women were later rescued, others were set free only through agreements established by the Parliament of Quillín in 1641. Some Spanish women became accustomed to life among the Mapuche and stayed voluntarily. The Spanish understood this phenomenon as a result either of women's weak character or their genuine shame over having been abused. Women in captivity gave birth to a large number of mestizos, who were rejected by the Spanish but accepted among the Mapuches. These women's children may have had a significant demographic impact in the Mapuche society, which was long ravaged by war and epidemics.) According to Guillaume Boccara, a Mapuche man that was monogamous or had few wives was perceived as being a poor warrior on account of their tradition of raptio. During the Arauco War and afterwards, polygamy enabled Mapuche chiefs to establish alliances through marriage, with the acquisition of more wives widening the possibilities for alliances. In general terms polygamy enables individual Mapuche men to increase their number of reciprocal relationships. In late colonial times and in the early Republic some officials, known as capitanes de amigos, who were allowed to live among friendly Mapuche tribes south of the frontier often married Mapuche women, with some of them going as far as engaging in polygamy.

== Bibliography ==
- Millaleo Hernández, Ana Gabriel (2018). Poligamia mapuche / Pu domo ñi Duam (un asunto de mujeres): Politización y despolitización de una práctica en relación a la posición de las mujeres al interior de la sociedad mapuche (PDF) (PhD thesis) (in Spanish). Santiago de Chile: University of Chile.
