= Fort Tolpán =

Fort Tolpán was built in 1657, by order of governor Pedro Porter Casanate by captain Alonso de Cordova y Figueroa on the Tolpán or Trolpán River. The Tolpán River was the name at that time for what is now the lower part of the Renaico River and then the Vergara River from the confluence with the Renaico until where it empties into the Bio Bio River. Tolpán or Trolpán is a contraction of the Mapudungun thol, "in front", and of pagui, "lion", meaning "in front of lion". Located at the confluence of the Renaico and Vergara Rivers, captain Cordova y Figueroa used the fort to operate against the Mapuche lands round about during the Mapuche Insurrection of 1655 but it was abandoned a few years later.

== See also ==
- La Frontera (geographical region)

== Sources ==
- Francisco Solano Asta-Buruaga y Cienfuegos, Diccionario geográfico de la República de Chile, SEGUNDA EDICIÓN CORREGIDA Y AUMENTADA, NUEVA YORK, D. APPLETON Y COMPAÑÍA, 1899, Pg. 843 Tolpán or Trolpán
