= Santa Fe (fort) =

Santa Fe de la Ribera was a fort constructed in 1602, by Alonso de Ribera at the confluence of the Biobio River and Vergara River, near the island of Diego Diaz. Its first garrison was two companies of soldiers, under the captains Francisco de Puebla and Alonso González de Nájera, who was in command of the place.

== See also ==
- La Frontera (geographical region) of Chile

== Sources ==
- Crescente Errázuriz, Seis años de la historia de Chile: 23 de diciembre de 1598 - 9 de abril de 1605: memoria histórica, Impr. Nacional, Santiago, 1881.
