= Rere, Chile =

Coordinates: 37°08′S 72°43′W

Rere is a town located in the commune of Yumbel, Province of Biobío, in the Bío Bío Region of Chile. It takes its name from the Moluche language of the indigenous confederation, or aillarehue, that occupied both sides of the Claro River and made up the greater confederation, or Butalmapu, between the Itata and Bio Bio Rivers. In 1603, then Royal Governor of Chile under Spanish rule Alonso de Ribera was to declare the erection of the areas first fort naming it Nuestra Señora de la Buena Esperanza (Our Lady of Good Hope). Later, in 1765, the town of Villa de San Luis Gonzaga de Rere was founded on that site by governor Antonio de Guill y Gonzaga. Today Rere sits 21 km west of the town of Yumbel.

== History ==
The origins of Rere are directly related to the frontier war which had raged between the Spanish and Mapuches since the beginning of Colonization. During the 16th century the process of founding cities and seizing of property and lands from a then consolidated indigenous population, ran into problems in the area of the Río Biobío.

At that time a governor arrived in Chile, Alonso de Ribera who, seeing the failures of his predecessors, drew up a plan aimed at giving a new dynamism to the process of European Conquest decided there were to be constructed a series of forts along the length of the Bío Bío. With that in mind and conjointly as an object to secure the natural frontier, around 1603, between Chillán y Concepción the King's Ranch or Estancia de Rey was founded - that same year wheat was sown and livestock came to inhabit the Estancia.

The fort was born as a consequence of the need to store the plundered harvests and livestock. It shaped was characterized much more for defense than for launching attacks against the Araucanos. Furthermore, because of its location with the back of the fort on the banks of the Bío Bío, it served as the intermediate point to aid nearby outposts or as the gradual point of withdrawal from an eventual indigenous counter-offensive.

It was also the Provincial Capital or Corregimiento de Rere. Later, it was the capital of the Partido de Rere, dependent of the Intendencia de Concepción, which in 1823 was converted to the Delegación de Rere. Afterward it was the capital of the Departamento de Rere, of the Provincia de Concepción. Later, the head of the administrative department was moved to Yumbel.

In 1891, with the Decreto de Creación de Municipalidades (Decree of Creation of Municipalities), The municipality of Municipio de San Luis Gonzaga was created, whose territory spans the 2nd subdelegation of San Luis Gonzaga del Departamento de Rere.

With the enactment of DFL 8582 on 30 December 1927, The Department of Yumbel was created from the Department of Rere, minus the territory of the Municipality of Tucapel.

== See also ==
- La Frontera (geographical region) of Chile

== Sources ==
- Francisco Solano Asta-Buruaga y Cienfuegos, Diccionario geográfico de la República de Chile, SEGUNDA EDICIÓN CORREGIDA Y AUMENTADA, NUEVA YORK, D. APPLETON Y COMPAÑÍA. 1899. Pg. 715 San Luis Gonzaga. — Villa
