= Pelantaro =

16/17th-century Mapuche warrior and leader

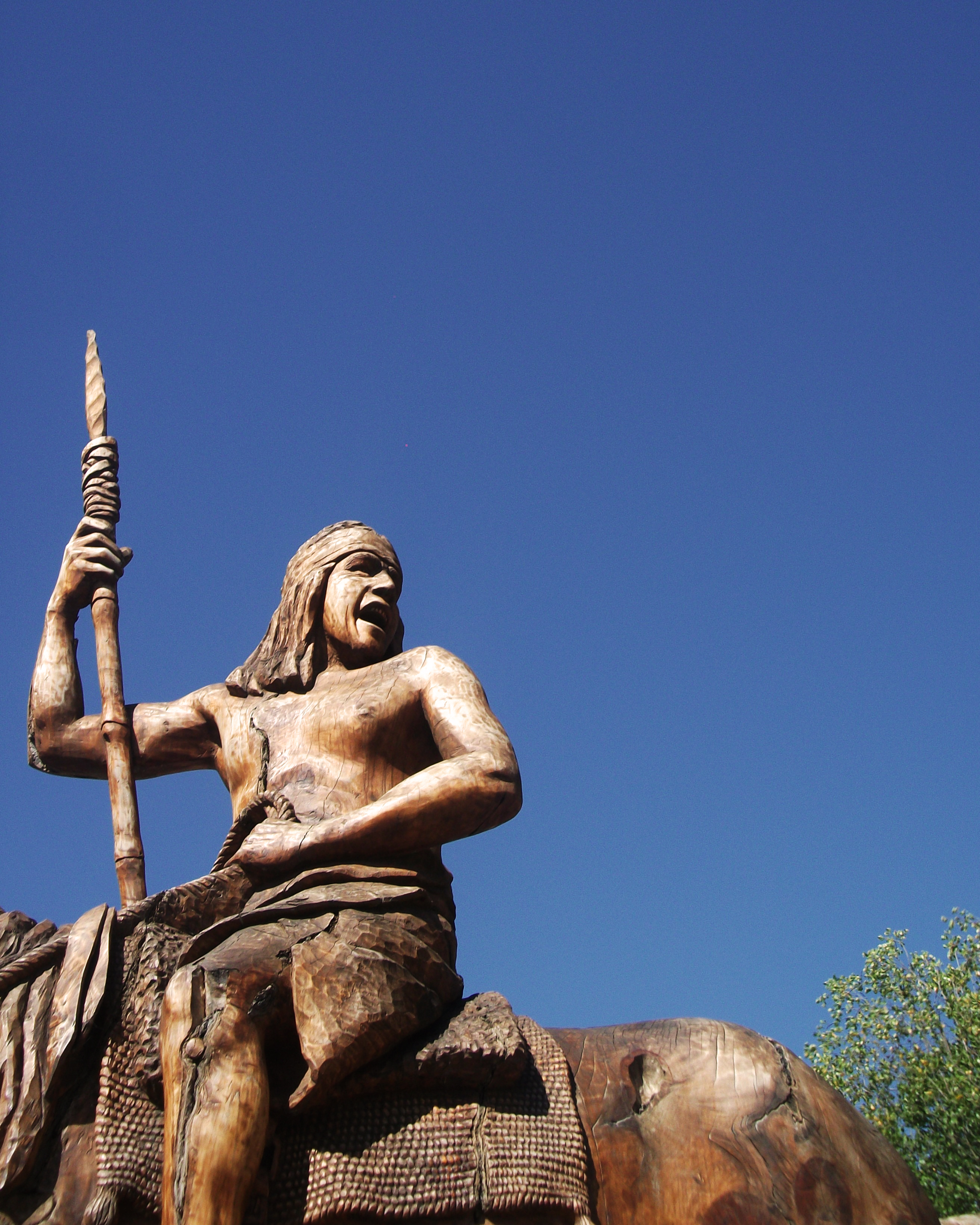
- Statue of Pelantaro in the Site Museum of the Fort of Purén.
- Rank: Toqui
- Conflicts: Battle of Curalaba

Pelantaro or Pelantarú (Spanish: [pelanˈtaɾo]; from Mapudungun: pelontraru, lit. 'Shining Caracara') was one of the vice toquis of Paillamachu, the toqui or military leader of the Mapuche people during the Mapuche uprising in 1598. Pelantaro and his lieutenants Anganamon and Guaiquimilla were credited with the death of the second Spanish Governor of Chile, Martín García Óñez de Loyola, during the Battle of Curalaba on December 21, 1598.

This provoked a general rising of the Mapuche and the other indigenous people associated with them. They succeeded in destroying all of the Spanish settlements south of the Bio-bio River and some to the north of it (Santa Cruz de Oñez and San Bartolomé de Chillán in 1599). After this actions, the following Governor, Alonso de Ribera, fixed a border and took the suggestions of the Jesuit Luis de Valdivia to fight a defensive war.

At one point, Pelantaro had both the heads of Pedro de Valdivia and Martín Óñez de Loyola and used them as trophies and containers for chicha, a kind of alcohol. As a demonstration of peaceful intentions, he gave them up in 1608.

Pelantaro was captured in 1616 and held for a year and a half until after the death of the governor Alonso de Ribera. He was released by his successor Fernando Talaverano Gallegos in a vain attempt to establish a peace with the Mapuche.

== See also ==
- Arauco War

== Sources ==
- Colección de documentos inéditos para la Historia de Chile, segunda serie, tomo VII, 1600–1606, Primer gobierno de Alonso de Rivera, publicadas por el Fondo Histórico y Bibliográfico de J. T. Medina, Santiago de Chile, 1982.
- Crescente Errázuriz, Seis años de la historia de Chile (23 de diciembre de 1598 – 9 de abril de 1605), Tomo I y II, Imprenta Nacional, 1882–1908.
- Alonso González de Nájera, Desengaño y reparo de la guerra de Chile, Editorial Andrés Bello, Santiago de Chile, 1971.
- Diego Ocaña, Viaje a Chile: relación del viaje a Chile, año de 1600, contenida en la crónica de viaje intitulada “A través de la América del Sur”, Colección Escritores Coloniales, Editorial Universitaria, 1era. Edición, Santiago de Chile, 1995.
- Alonso de Ovalle, Histórica relación del Reino de Chile y de las misiones y ministerios que ejercita en él la Compañía de Jesús ..., Reproducción digital de la edición de Roma, Francisco Caballo, 1646, Alicante : Biblioteca Virtual Miguel de Cervantes, 2007.
- Roger Arteaga Cea PELANTARO: el gran toqui de Purén
