= Lonquén =

Coordinates: 33°42′41″S 70°51′17″W

Lonquén (Mapudungun for "on the low lands") is a town in Chile, located between the communities of Talagante and Isla de Maipo, within the Metropolitan Region of Santiago.

== History ==
In pre-Columbian times, Lonquén was occupied by the cultures Bato and Llolleo. Later, it was a place of connection between the Aymaras and the Mapuches. When the Spaniards arrived, they created two estates under Francisco Ruiz-Tagle Vestibules. They were inherited by his son Caesar. In 1928, the land was divided in three estates: Sorrento, Santa Teresa and the Recreation, in which the economy was based on agriculture. In the earthquake of 1971, the damage forced many people to leave.

=== Lime kiln ===
On 15 October 1973, 15 men were arrested in the community of Isla de Maipo. Their remains were found on 30 November 1978 in abandoned lime kilns in Lonquén.

February 19, 2010, the Health Science Center of the University of Texas Laboratory delivered the results of their four-year analysis, identifying thirteen of the fifteen victims. These were Enrique Astudillo Álvarez, Omar Astudillo Rojas, Ramón Astudillo Rojas, Miguel Ángel Brant Bustamante, Nelson Hernández Flores, Carlos Hernández Flores, José Herrera Villegas, Iván Ordóñez Lama, Sergio Maureira Lillo, Sergio Maureira Muñoz, José Maureira Muñoz, Segundo Maureira Muñoz and Rodolfo Maureira Muñoz.

In January 1980, the lime kilns were dynamited.

== People ==
Lonquén is the place in which Víctor Jara lived during his childhood.

== See also ==
- Fort Lonquén
- Lonquén River

== Bibliography ==
- El caso de Lonquen
- Capture of the Official in charge of the Murders of Lonquen
- Chile: The Furnaces of Lonquen
- Documentary Video the Furnaces of Lonquen
