= San Fabián de Conuco =

Fort in Chile

San Fabián de Conuco is a fort four kilometers south of the town of Rafael, Chile. It was first established by governor Alonso de Sotomayor in 1584 to secure control of the Coelemu region between the Itata River and Concepcion. It was destroyed and was then restored in 1657 by order of governor Pedro Porter Casanate. The Mapudungun word means water of torcaza from сопu, the bird called the torcaza and from со "water".

== See also ==
- La Frontera (geographical region)

== Sources ==
- Francisco Solano Asta-Buruaga y Cienfuegos, Diccionario geográfico de la República de Chile, SEGUNDA EDICIÓN CORREGIDA Y AUMENTADA, NUEVA YORK, D. APPLETON Y COMPAÑÍA, 1899, Pg. 177 Conuco
