= Fort Virguenco =

Spanish fort

Fort Virhuenco was a Spanish fort located in what is now Araucanía Region of southern Chile. It was first established by Alonso de Ribera in 1613 as part of his system of frontier forts. It was located in the valley of Virhuén southeast of the city of Angol and in the upper part of the Rehue River near the western part the region of Quechereguas where the high mountains begin. Later it was abandoned or destroyed. Again in 1665 Governor Francisco de Meneses Brito erected there fort San Carlos, which, the Mapuches took and killed all the garrison on May 20, 1667.

The name of Virhuén and also that of Virhuenco are alterations of the Mapudungun virquen or virquyn that means "cold earth".

== Sources ==
- Francisco Solano Asta Buruaga y Cienfuegos Diccionario geográfico de la República de Chile, SEGUNDA EDICIÓN CORREGIDA Y AUMENTADA, NUEVA YORK, D. APPLETON Y COMPAÑÍA. 1899. Pg.887 Virhuén.—Comarca
