= Fort Chepe =

Coordinates: 36.8125°S 73.0625°W

Fort Chepe was a fort established in 1603 by Governor Alonso de Ribera on Cerro de Chepe (Chepe Hill) west of Concepcion, Chile on the north bank of the Bio Bio River. It was built to defend the crossing of the Bio Bio River at this point near the mouth of the river, and of the road to old Concepcion. During the Chilean War of Independence guns on these heights opposed the naval landing of the Royalist force of Antonio Pareja on March 27, 1813, and also was a factor in later battles west of Concepcion.

== Sources ==
- Francisco Solano Asta Buruaga y Cienfuegos, Diccionario geográfico de la República de Chile, SEGUNDA EDICIÓN CORREGIDA Y AUMENTADA, NUEVA YORK, D. APPLETON Y COMPAÑÍA. 1899. pg. 227 Chepe (Cerro de)
