= De Lillo =

de Lillo is a surname. Notable people with the surname include:

- Antonietta De Lillo (born 1960), Italian film director
- Domenico De Lillo (born 1937), Italian cyclist
- Don DeLillo (born 1936), American writer and playwright
- Ginés de Lillo (1566–1630), Spanish soldier

== See also ==
- Puebla de Lillo, municipality in the province of León, Castile and León, Spain
- San Miguel de Lillo, church in Asturias, Spain
