= Alonso García de Ramón =

Royal Governor of Chile

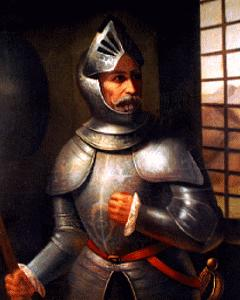
Alonso García de Ramón

Alonso García de Ramón (c. 1552 – August 5, 1610) was a Spanish soldier and twice Royal Governor of Chile: first temporarily from July 1600 to February 1601, and then from March 1605 to August 1610. He was born in Cuenca, Spain in 1552.

== Early life ==
He served from the age of 16 in the Spanish Army first against the Morisco revolt in Granada. Then he was in Italy and Sicily, where he was cabo de escuadra, in the squadron of Juan of Austria in the 1572 battle of Navarino following the battle of Lepanto. Then in 1574, he was in the garrison of Goleta during the campaign of Juan of Austria in Tunis. In 1576 he survived under Alvaro de Bazan, Marquess of Santa Cruz in the Battle of Querquenes at the Kerkennah Islands.

He next went to Flanders as a sergeant under Alexander Farnese, Duke of Parma. He was in the assault of the city of Zichem, the attack of Borgerhout and the siege and assault of Maestricht where he was one of the first that mounted the walls; twice wounded taking two flags, for which he was awarded twelve ducados by the Duke.

== Military service in Chile and Peru ==
He returned to Spain and then went to Chile, fighting with skill and bravery for Governor Alonso de Sotomayor against the Mapuche. His most famous action was at the siege of Purén where he killed the Toqui Cadeguala in mounted single combat. Soon after Martín García Óñez de Loyola replaced Sotomayor, García de Ramón moved to Peru, and earned the confidence of the Viceroy of Peru, García Hurtado de Mendoza, 5th Marquis of Cañete who entrusted him with many positions, that he carried out with brilliance including those of corregidor of Arica and Potosí. From 1599, when Francisco de Quiñónez was sent to Chile, he was maestre de campo of all Peru and was one of the most trusted military advisors of Viceroy, Luis de Velasco.

== First Governorship of Chile ==
García de Ramón was sent to relieve Francisco de Quiñónez as interim governor arriving in Chile on July 29, 1600. He arrived in Santiago the next day and was installed as governor. He soon discovered things were worse in southern Chile than he had known in Peru, La Imperial had been lost in April. Without reinforcements from Peru he was forced to extract men, arms and supplies from the cities of Chile by means of imposing extraordinary contributions, special taxes, and confiscating cattle, horses, saddles and arms that allowed him quickly form a well equipped army of 400 men by December 1600.

By early January, his army had marched to Chillán where he was forced to leave a detachment to prevent Mapuche incursions above the Itata River. He moved on to Concepcion where he planned to relieve the remaining besieged fort Valdivia and cities of Villarica, and Osorno. His attempt to send aid by ship to Valdivia and Chiloé failed when the ship was stolen by deserters from the army fleeing Chile for Peru. Unwilling to give up he planned to advance south via the central valley, to Angol, Purén and Lumaco, to aid Villarrica, and on to Osorno in the south linking up with Francisco del Campo advancing from fort Valdivia. However, he and 310 men had not advanced further than Quilacoya (47 km southward by the Biobio River) when he had word that Arauco was now under siege and required relief. He had turned back to go to its aid when he was informed that Alonso de Ribera had arrived to assume the governorship in February 1601.

== Second Governorship of Chile ==
Appointed in 1605 to replace Alonso de Ribera as Governor of Chile, he used the base of forts established by his predecessor as bases for his campaigns against the Mapuche.

In 1606, the Spanish forces of Garcia Ramon fought the Mapuche army under the caciques Aillavilu II, Anganamón, Pelantaru and Longoñongo in the Battle of Boroa. Approximately 500 Spaniards, defeated 6,000 Mapuches. García de Ramón then built Fort San Ignacio de la Redención near Boroa but it was soon abandoned after the ambush of most of its garrison.

In 1607, García de Ramón rebuilt Fort Purén and San Jerónimo de Millapoa in Catirai but as a result of the Parliament of Catirai he soon dismantled the later.

== Sources ==
- José Toribio Medina, Diccionario biográfico colonial de Chile, Impr. Elziviriana, Santiago, 1906, Pg. 338 - 341 Alonso García de Ramón
- Diego Barros Arana, Historia general de Chile. Tomo tercero
  - Capítulo XVII, Parts 7-9
  - Capítulo XXI
  - Capítulo XXII

Government offices
Preceded by Francisco de Quiñónez	Royal Governor of Chile; 1600–1601	Succeeded by Alonso de Ribera
Preceded by Alonso de Ribera	Royal Governor of Chile; 1605–1610	Succeeded by Luis Merlo de la Fuente
