= Isla del Laja =

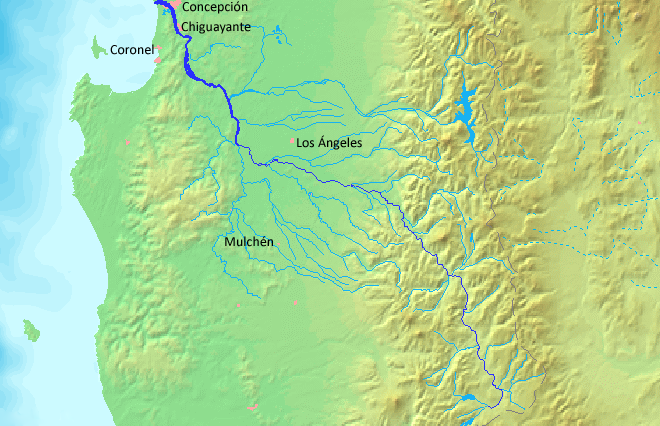
The area corresponding to Isla del Laja stretches from the Bío Bío river (dark blue) and the Laja river (the northernmost shown watercourse that originates from the Andes).

Isla del Laja (lit. Island of the Laja) is an old name for a strip of land in Central Chile, located between the Laja River in the north and the Bío Bío River in the south. Prior to 1791 Isla del Laja was also a corregimiento, an administrative division of Colonial Chile.

== See also ==
- Banditry in Chile
- Guerra a muerte
- Pehuenche
- Pincheira brothers
