= Fort Paicaví =

Fort Paicaví (Fuerte de Paicaví or Plaza de Paicaví) was a fort established in 1603 by Alonso de Ribera, then Governor of Chile. It was situated at a ford along the main road from Arauco, bordered on the south by the Paicaví River. It was soon destroyed by Mapuche insurgents, but was eventually rebuilt by Francisco de Meneses Brito in 1665.

In 1612, the Parliament of Paicaví could be held here in the consolidation of the defensive war strategy proclaimed by Luis de Valdivia. In January of the same year, in a summary trial conducted by Governor Juan de la Jaraquemada, 13 Spanish soldiers accused of sodomy in the fort were burned at the stake.
