= Pangue Hydroelectric Plant =

Hydroelectric power station in Chile

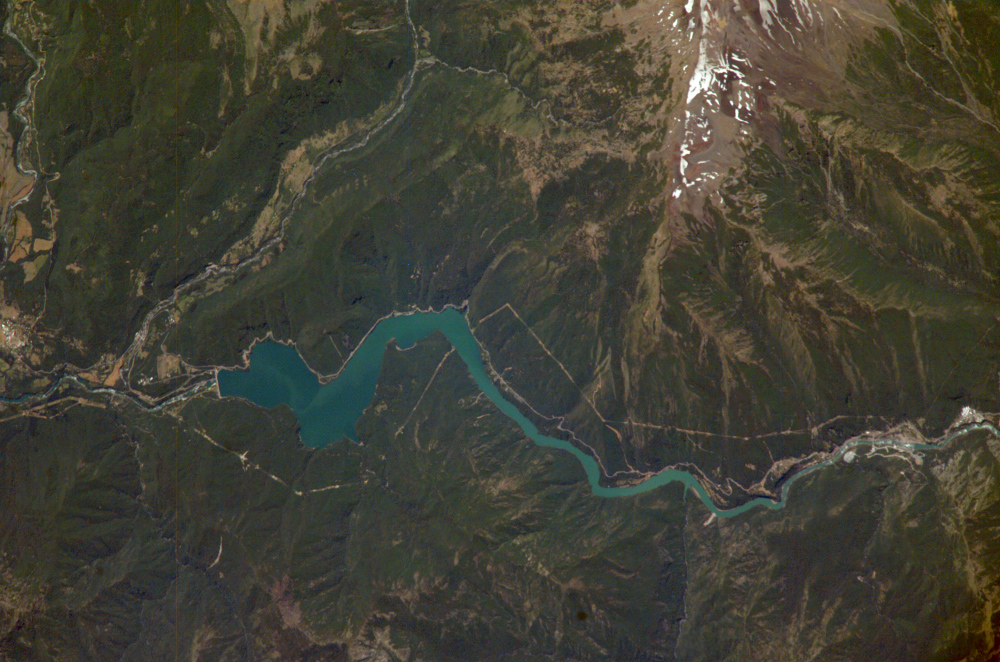
- NASA image
- Country: Chile
- Coordinates: 37°54′39″S 71°36′40″W
- Status: Operational
- Commission date: 1996; 30 years ago
- Owner: Enel Generación Chile
- Operator: Enel Generación Chile

Power generation
- Nameplate capacity: 467 MW (626,000 hp)

External links
- Commons: Related media on Commons

Pangue Hydroelectric Plant is a hydroelectric power station in Bío Bío Region, Chile. It lies west of Callaqui volcano at the confluence of the rivers Pangue and Huiri-Huiri. The plant uses water from the upper Bío Bío River and produces 467 megawatts (626,000 hp) of electricity. The plant was built by Endesa in 1996.

== Technical features ==
The penstock delivering water to the power plant has a hydraulic head of 103 metres (338 ft) and a design volume of 500 cubic metres per second (18,000 cu ft/s). Pangue contributes 10% of the electricity fed into the Chilean integrated grid, making it the third largest power station after Ralco (640 megawatts (860,000 hp)) and Pehuenche (500 megawatts (670,000 hp)). The dam is made of roller-compacted concrete, using about a million cubic meter of concrete. The dam and power plant were built from 1993 to 1996. Behind the dam lies a reservoir of 500 hectares (1,200 acres), 14 kilometres (8.7 mi) long and 360 metres (1,180 ft) wide. This makes it one of the most efficient large hydropower plants in the world, as measured by the relation between electricity production and area flooded. The construction of Pangue, just as the one of Ralco, generated controversies between environmentalists, the Government and the private power company Endesa, because the dam impacted the indigenous Pehuenche people, whitewater rafting areas and the rights of farmers further downstream.

== Controversy over water rights ==
During the construction of the dam, the Appellate Court of Concepcion halted construction arguing that the filling of the reservoir and the dam’s operation unduly affected the water rights of farmers further downstream. However, the Chilean Supreme Court overruled the lower court and decided that the nonconsumptive water rights of Endesa took precedence over the consumptive water rights of irrigators. One U.S. scholar said that the decision relied on a government report that itself was “hard to interpret as anything other than a response to political pressure from higher levels of government”, that the decision was “seriously flawed”, made “on the basis of legal reasoning of dubious quality” and that the decision constituted “a major transfer of wealth from irrigators to electric companies”.
