= Alonso González de Nájera =

Alonso González de Nájera (died 1614) was a Spanish soldier and an advocate of reforms in the conduct of the War of Arauco. He served in the war following the Disaster of Curalaba and the great Mapuche uprising that followed in Chile that resulted in the loss of all the Spanish settlements south of the Bio Bio River. He was sent back to the royal court in Spain to argue for a reform to the way the war against the Mapuche was fought. Nájera's arguments for his reforms were incorporated in his book of Desengaño y reparo de la Guerra del Reino de Chile (Disappointment and Reparation of the War of the Kingdom of Chile).

== Biography ==
There is no information on his life before 1600. It is only known that he served in the Spanish army in Flanders and then in France. On November 13, 1600, he left Lisbon for Chile with the rank of captain under the command of Francisco Martinez de Leiva. He arrived in Mendoza in May 1601, afterward moving to the south of Chile, where he remained until 1607.

Alonso de Ribera, Governor of the Captaincy General of Chile, founded the fort Nacimiento on the banks of the Bio Bio near the confluence with the river Vergara, December 24, 1603. Gonzalez, Najera was responsible for building it and was its first garrison commander. After four years of military service in the war zone, he was appointed sargento mayor by the newly appointed Governor Alonso García Ramón in 1605. He later returned to Santiago sick and wounded in his leg, as a result of his participation in the war.

Because of the critical military situation in Chile, Governor Ramon Garcia decided to send González de Nájera to Spain to report to King Philip III on the true state of the territory. The choice of González was based on his long years of experience and skilled, zealous service to the king in many prominent posts and positions in the army. In May 1607, he departed for Spain, where he arrived at the end of the next year. To record the critical situation that lived in Chile, and to convince the Council of the Indias and the King to send relief to Chile, he drafted and presented some considerations which were later transformed into the fifth and sixth points of his book Desengaño y reparo de la Guerra del Reino de Chile.

In the Court, Gonzalez de Najera made a series of recommendations on how to continue the war. He pointed out the weaknesses that the current methods used in the war suffered, especially the system of "campeadas" or incursions that the Hispanic army made in Mapuche territory to burn their fields and to hunt them for slaves. He not only set out his criticism, but proposed to establish a new system to complete the conquest of the Mapuche territory and to finish with the war. This consisted of the creation of a line of forts that separated both territories, a professional army that operated from them towards the interior of Mapuche territory, the extermination of the natives who were to be hunted as slaves and their replacement by black slaves from Africa, apparently considered less rebellious than the Mauche. However, he was not heard and the Governors request for relief did not succeed. The actual decision was to impose Luis de Valdivia's system of defensive war, contrary to what was suggested by Gonzalez de Najera. However his merits were recognized and he was appointed Governor of Puerto Hércules in Tuscany, where he finished his life sometime in 1614 although the date is uncertain.

Gonzalez de Najera did not succeed in getting his book Desengaño y reparo de la Guerra del Reino de Chile, published. Although he finished writing it in 1614, it never was published while he was still alive, being printed more than two centuries later in Madrid, in 1866, containing his arguments and proposals and in 1889 in Chile, with a biographical introduction by Jose Toribio Medina.

== Sources ==
- Alonso González de Nájera, Desengaño y reparo de la guerra del Reino de Chile, Imprenta de la Viuda de Calero, Madrid, 1866
- Desengaño y reparo de la guerra del reino de Chile Alonso González de Nájera, Desengaño y reparo de la guerra del Reino de Chile, Reproducción digital de la edición de Santiago de Chile, Imprenta de Ercilla, 1889.
