= Juan de la Jaraquemada =

Spanish politician

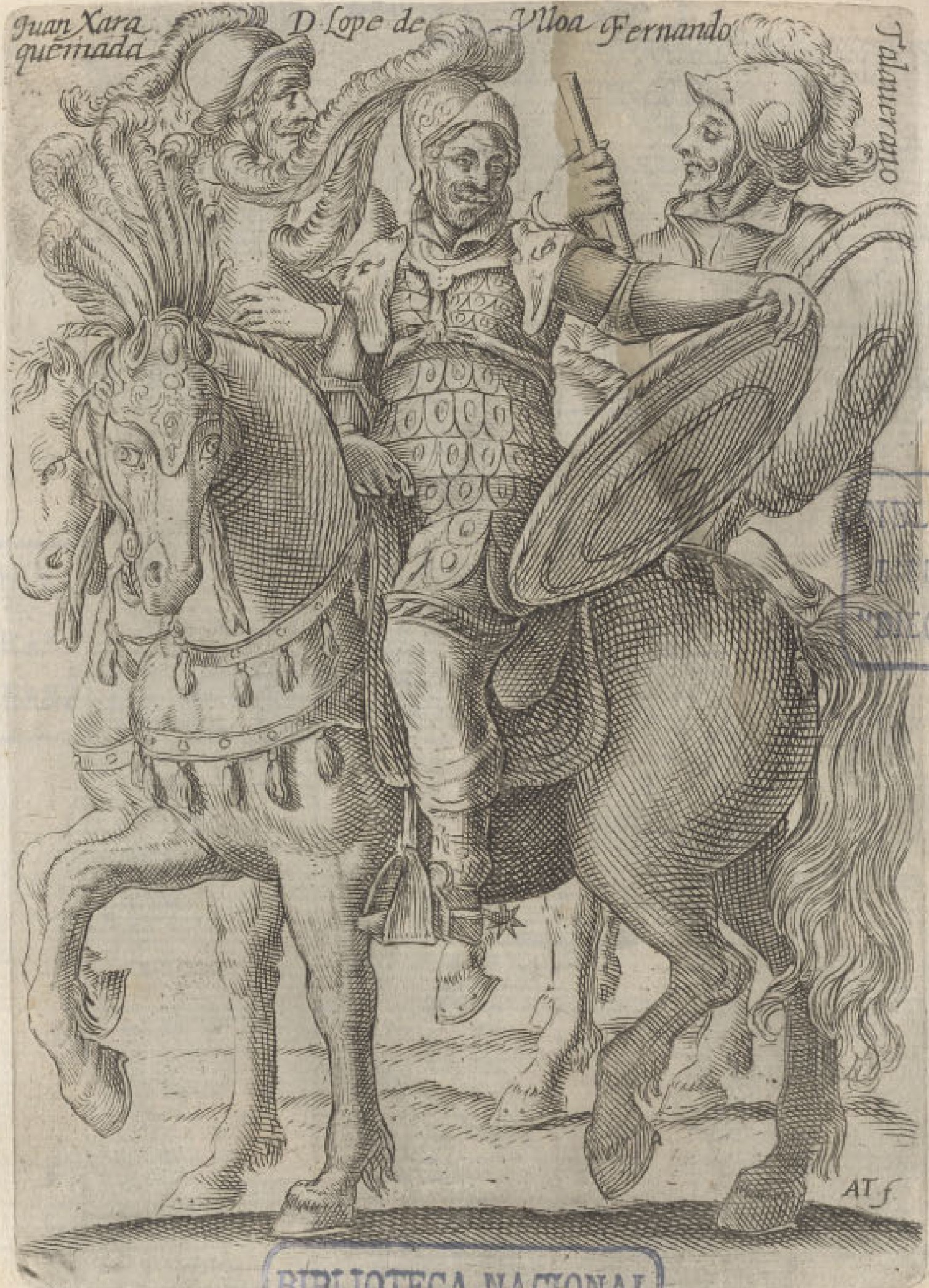

Juan de la Jaraquemada, (Canary Islands ? – † Santiago of Chile, April 1612); Spanish soldier, designated by the viceroy of Peru Juan de Mendoza y Luna, Marquess of Montesclaros, Captain General and Governor of Chile, and president of the Real Audiencia of Santiago. He served from January 1, 1611 to March 27, 1612

Government offices
Preceded by Luis Merlo de la Fuente	Royal Governor of Chile; 1611–1612	Succeeded by Alonso de Ribera
