= Malleco River =

River in La Araucanía Region, Chile

Coordinates: 37°44′S 72°42′W

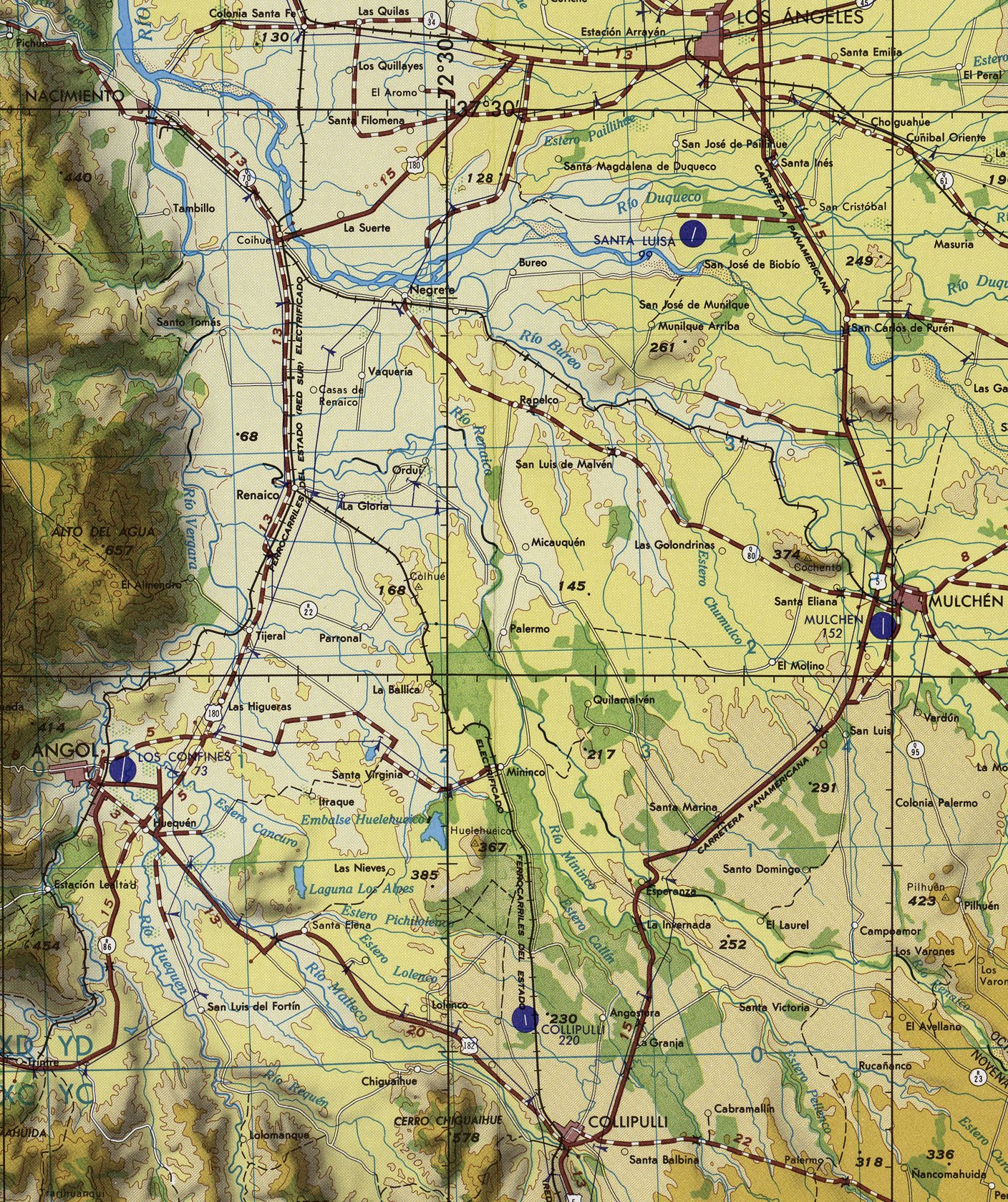
Malleco River, flows into the Vergara River

The Malleco River is a river in Malleco Province, La Araucanía Region, central Chile. It rises in the western slopes of the Andes, within the Tolhuaca National Park and near Tolhuaca Volcano. After passing by Tolhuaca, it drops into a 50 meter waterfall before continuing towards the Pacific. The river is a major tributary to the Vergara River, which is a tributary of the Biobío River. The Malleco Viaduct, built in 1890 and at the time the highest railroad bridge in the world, is the main landmark of the river and a candidate as a UNESCO World Heritage Site.
