= Bureo River =

Buero River
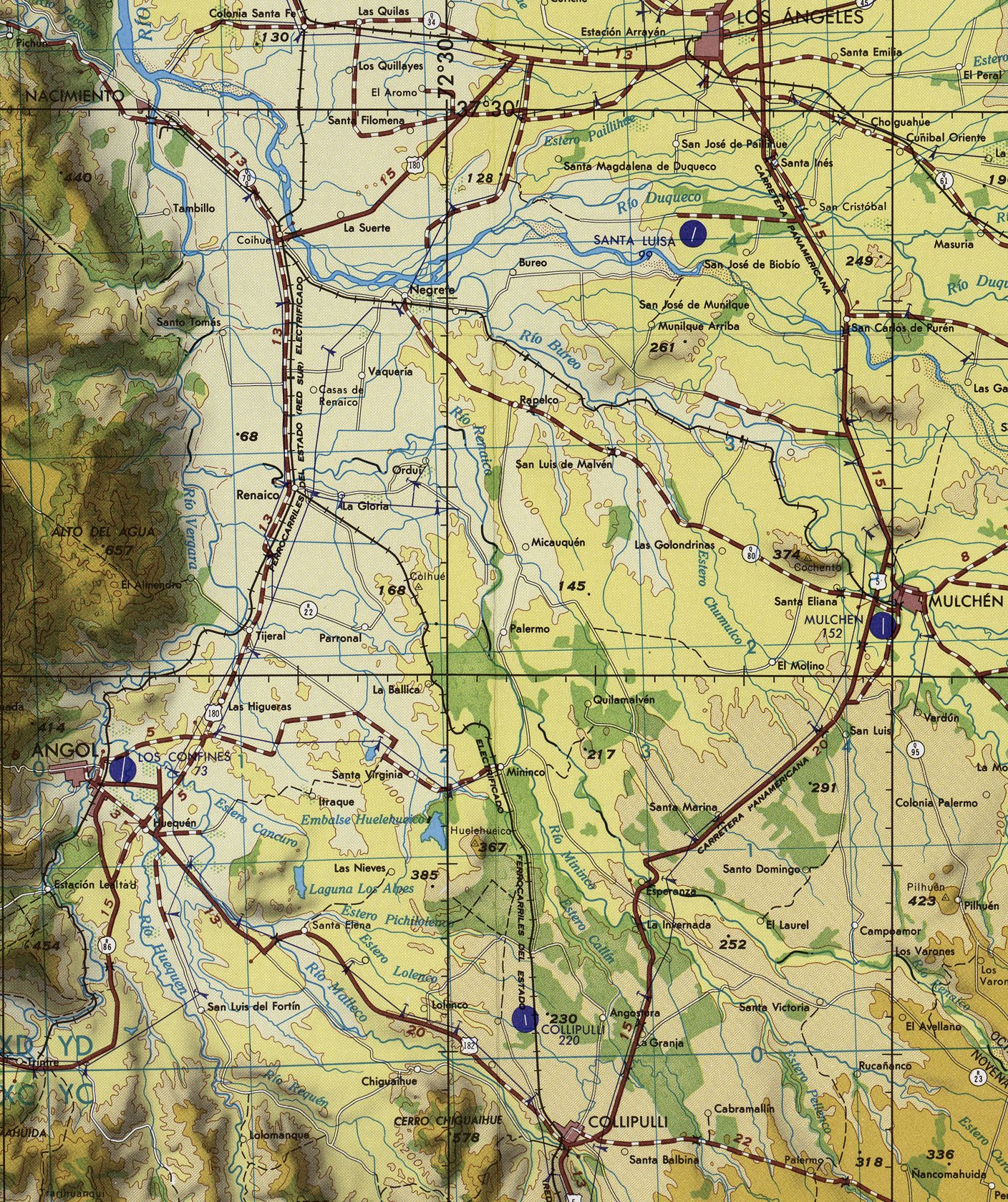

Location
- Country: Chile

Physical characteristics
- Mouth: Bío Bío River
  - coordinates: 37.5817°S 72.5061°W

The Bureo is a river of Biobío Province, Biobío Region, Chile. The Buero surrounds by a meander the city of Mulchén on all sides except the south.

It has a junction with the stream Malven.
