= Galletué Lake =

Lake in Chile

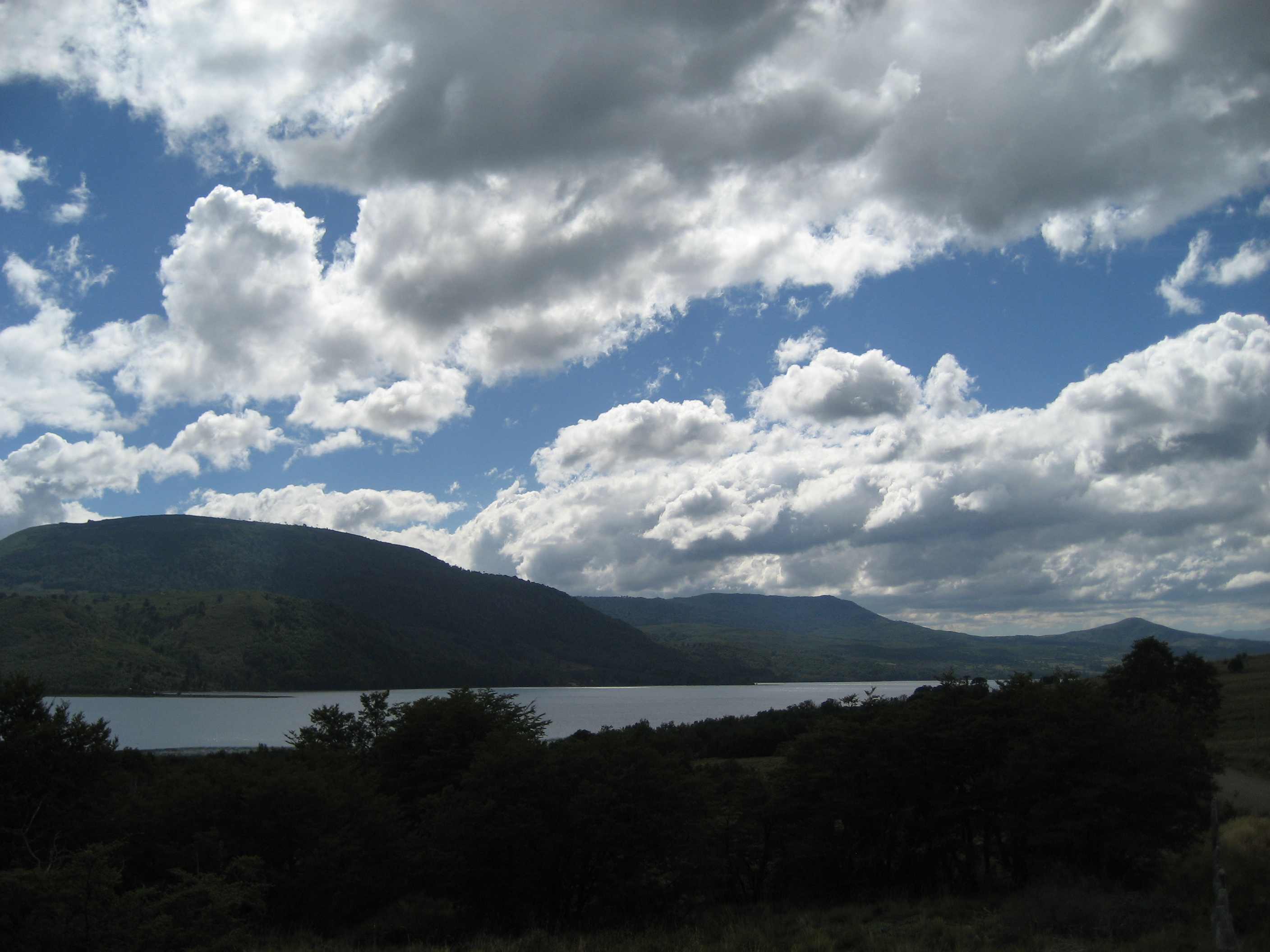

- Location within Chile
- Coordinates: 38°40′51″S 71°17′0″W
- Type: glacial
- Primary inflows: Ñirreco and Miraflores rivers (Quinquén Valley)
- Primary outflows: Biobío River
- Catchment area: 320 square kilometres (120 sq mi)
- Basin countries: Chile
- Max. length: 8 kilometres (5.0 mi)
- Max. width: 2.5 kilometres (1.6 mi)
- Surface area: 12.5 square kilometres (3,100 acres)
- Max. depth: 50 metres (160 ft)
- Water volume: .4 cubic kilometres (320,000 acre⋅ft)
- Surface elevation: 1,150 m (3,770 ft)

Galletué Lake, also spelled as Gualletué Lake, is located in the Andes of the La Araucanía Region of southern Chile. It is surrounded by mountains on three sides. Issuing from the lake on its eastern side is one of the two sources of the Biobío River, the other being nearby Icalma Lake. The lake is in the ecoregion of the Valdivian Temperate Rain Forest. The monkey-puzzle tree (Araucaria araucana), locally called "pehuen", is the most distinctive of the tree species in the forest.

== Quinquén Community ==
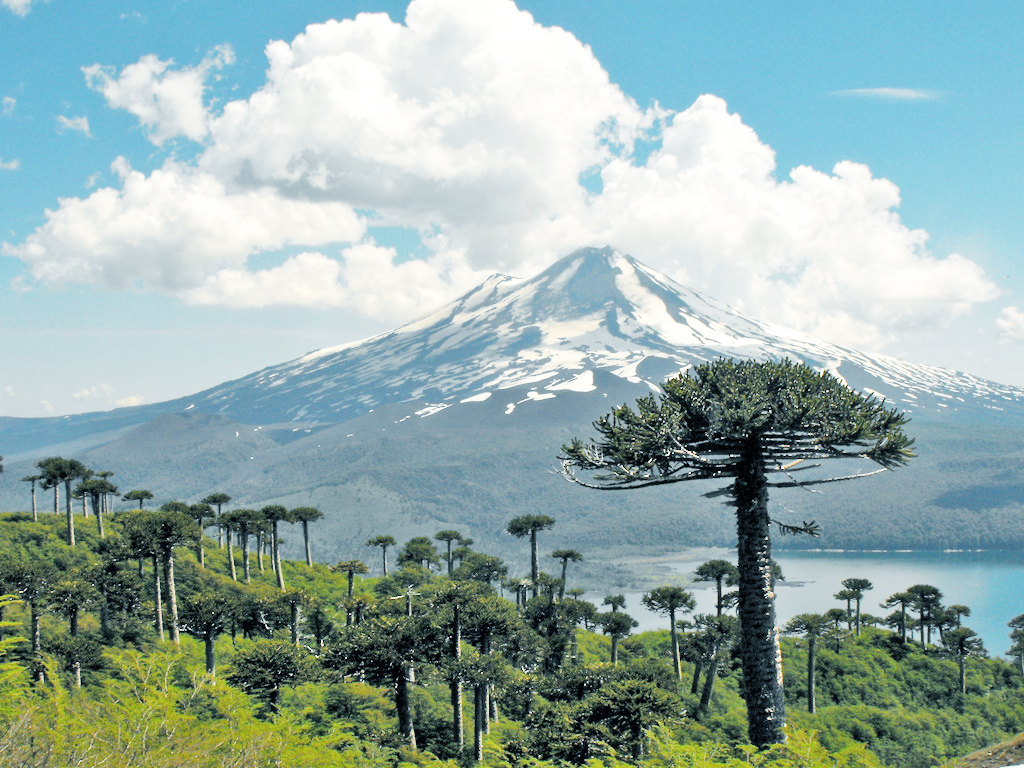
Araucaria trees in nearby Conguillio National Park.

The drainage area upstream from Galletué Lake is called the Quinquén Valley. About 10 kilometres (6.2 mi) east of Lake Galletué, the Quinquèn river combines with the Zamueco River to form the Ñirecco River, which flows into Galletué Lake. The Pehuenche (or Pewenche) people have lived in this valley for several hundred years. They came under the control of the government of Chile during the 1880-1883 "Mountain Campaign" to pacify and establish Chilean rule over the Mapuche and other indigenous peoples.

In the early 1900s, a white rancher paid the Pehuenche to graze his cattle in the valley during summer, but he later claimed that he owned the land. Thus began a century-long dispute about ownership and land rights in the Galletué Lake area.

Two sawmills began operation in 1946, and extensive logging began. The loggers exploited the lush forests of monkey-puzzle (Araucaria araucana) trees, thus depriving the Pehuenche of one of their most important foods and sources of income, the pine nuts produced in abundance by the araucaria trees. In the early 21st century, the araucaria is an endangered species due to logging, forest fires, and grazing.

The Pehuenche resisted the loggers in armed confrontations; the indigenous people were repressed by the police in the 1960s. In 1987, a forest fire caused by the logging companies burned hundreds of acres of Araucaria trees. In 1989, the Chilean courts ordered the expulsion of the Pehuenche from the Quinquén valley.

However, the Pehuenche found an ally in newly-elected Chilean President Patricio Aylwin. In 1990, Aylwin forbade the logging of Araucaria trees and in 1991 declared the Quinquén Valley to be the National Reserve of the Galletué. He directed purchase of the lands from logging companies for the Pehuenche. The government completed the purchase in 1992, acquiring 26,510 hectares (65,500 acres) for 6,150,000 U.S. dollars. The land purchased included Galletué Lake and adjacent areas. But, legal challenges prevented the transfer of the land to the Pehuenche families living in the valley for a number of years.

Much of the land purchased by the government was finally titled to the Pehuenche in 2007. With assistance from the World Wildlife Fund and Chilean environmental organizations, the Pehuenche have focused on developing the land for eco-tourism. More than 120 Pehuenche families occupy the area purchased.
