= Icalma Lake =

Lake in Chile

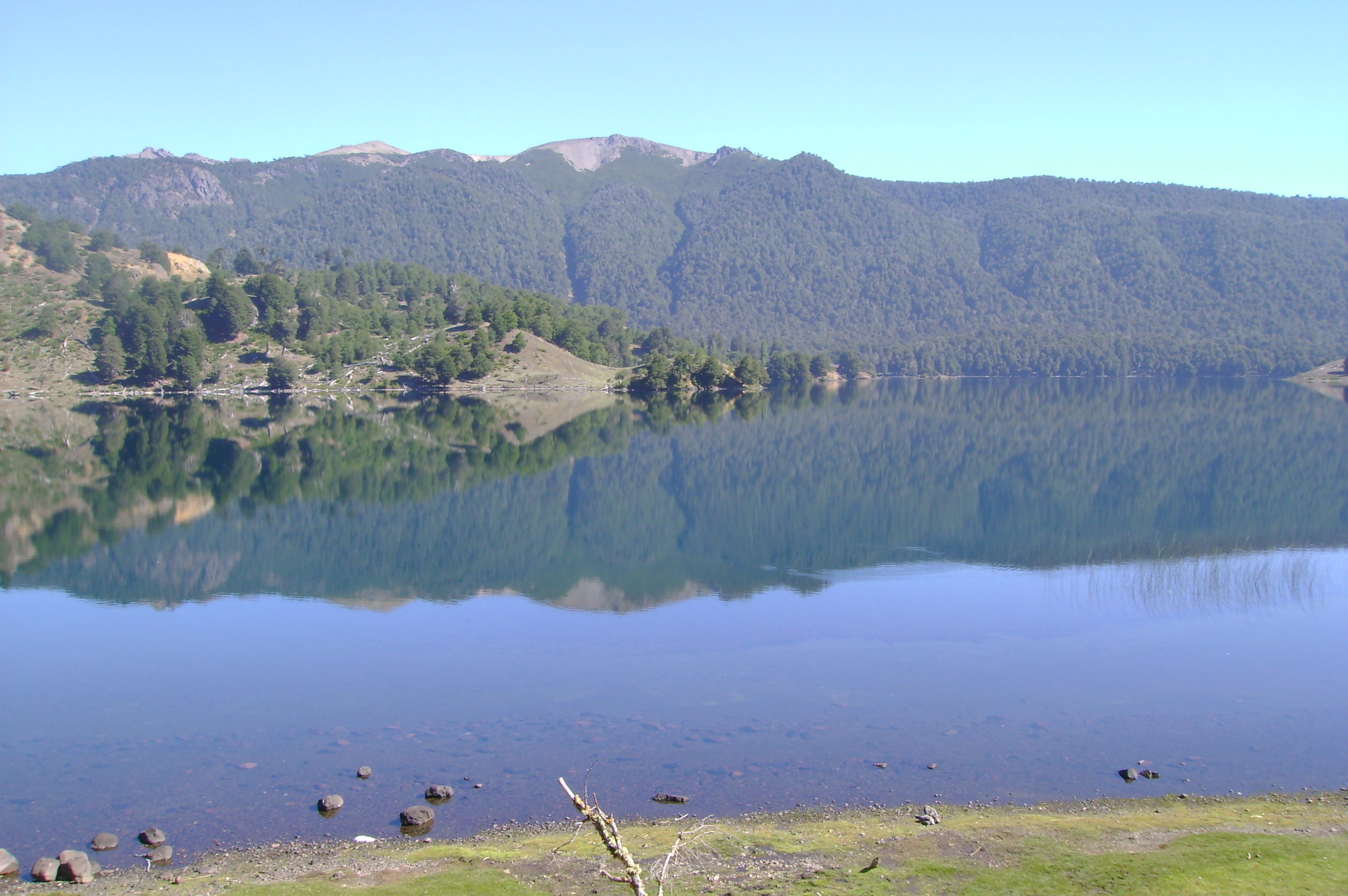

- Location within Chile
- Coordinates: 38°48′S 71°17′W
- Primary inflows: Huillinco and Icalma rivers
- Primary outflows: Rukanuco River
- Catchment area: 150 km^{2} (58 sq mi)
- Basin countries: Chile
- Max. length: 9 kilometres (5.6 mi)
- Max. width: 2.5 kilometres (1.6 mi)
- Surface area: 9.8 square kilometres (2,400 acres)
- Average depth: 66 m (217 ft)
- Max. depth: 135 m (443 ft)
- Water volume: .6 cubic kilometres (490,000 acre⋅ft)
- Surface elevation: 1,150 m (3,770 ft)

Icalma Lake is a lake of glacial origin located in the Andes of the La Araucanía Region of Chile. A hamlet on the southern shore of the lake is also called Icalma. About 3 kilometres (1.9 mi) from the hamlet is Icalma Pass, 1,307 metres (4,288 ft) in elevation and on the border with Argentina. The pass is traversed by a road, unpaved in Chile in 2017 and sometimes impassable during the Southern Hemisphere winter due to heavy snows. Icalma Airport is located 9 kilometres (5.6 mi) northeast of the hamlet and some 8 kilometres (5.0 mi) from the border with Argentina.

Icalma Lake is connected to the Laguna Chica de Icalma (Little Lake of Icalma) by a short stream about 300 metres (980 ft) long. The two lakes together have a surface area of 11.7 square kilometres (2,900 acres). Icalma Lake drains northeastwards by way of a 10 kilometres (6.2 mi) long river named Rukanuco. Icalma Lake and nearby Galletué Lake are the sources of the Bio Bio River.

== Flora and fauna ==
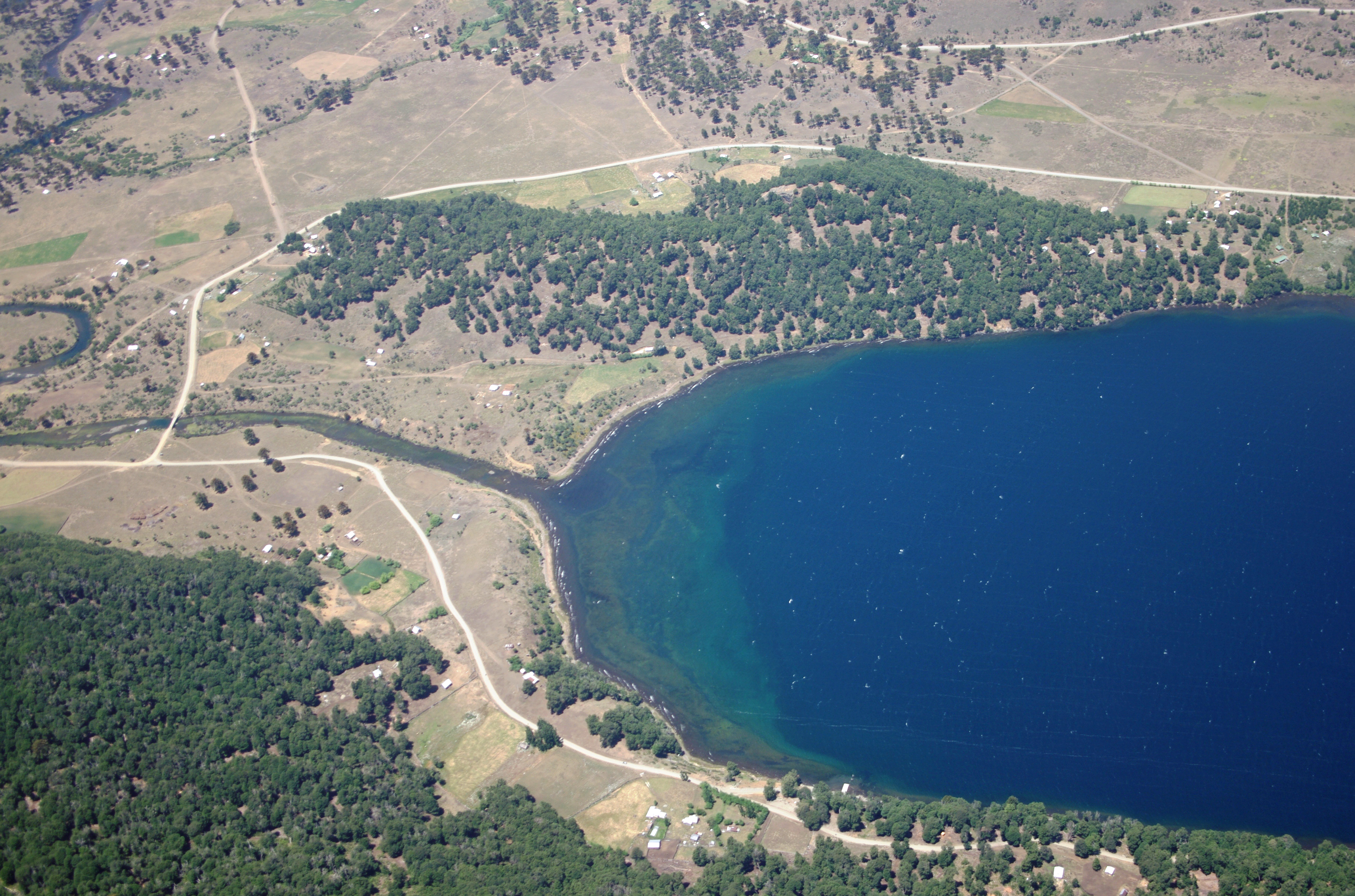
The outlet from Lake Icalma, one of the two sources of the Bio Bio River.

The most abundant species of fish in the lake is the brown trout. The lake also has a population of rainbow trout. Neither species is native to Chile.

The lake and village are in the ecoregion of the Valdivian Temperate Rain Forest. The monkey-puzzle tree (Araucaria araucana) locally called "pehuen" is the most distinctive of the tree species in the forest.

== Climate ==
Under the Köppen climate classification, Icalma has an oceanic climate, designated Csb. Under the Trewartha climate classification the climate is Crlk: mild summers, cool winters, and humid.

Climate data for Icalma
Month	Jan	Feb	Mar	Apr	May	Jun	Jul	Aug	Sep	Oct	Nov	Dec	Year
Mean daily maximum °C (°F)	24.3 (75.7)	23.9 (75.0)	21.3 (70.3)	16.9 (62.4)	11.4 (52.5)	6.7 (44.1)	6.6 (43.9)	8.7 (47.7)	12.5 (54.5)	16.6 (61.9)	19.5 (67.1)	21.8 (71.2)	16.0 (60.8)
Daily mean °C (°F)	14.6 (58.3)	14.1 (57.4)	12.0 (53.6)	8.6 (47.5)	5.7 (42.3)	3.6 (38.5)	3.8 (38.8)	4.5 (40.1)	6.1 (43.0)	8.5 (47.3)	11.0 (51.8)	13.0 (55.4)	8.8 (47.8)
Mean daily minimum °C (°F)	5.0 (41.0)	4.3 (39.7)	2.8 (37.0)	0.4 (32.7)	0.1 (32.2)	0.4 (32.7)	1.0 (33.8)	0.4 (32.7)	−0.2 (31.6)	0.5 (32.9)	2.5 (36.5)	4.3 (39.7)	1.6 (34.9)
Average precipitation mm (inches)	28 (1.1)	34 (1.3)	64 (2.5)	87 (3.4)	200 (7.9)	231 (9.1)	218 (8.6)	162 (6.4)	99 (3.9)	56 (2.2)	61 (2.4)	44 (1.7)	1,284 (50.6)

== See also ==
- Llaima
- Sollipulli
- Bertrand, Sébastien; Charlet, François; Chapron, Emmanuel; Fagel, Nathalie; De Batist, Marc (2008). "Reconstruction of the Holocene seismotectonic activity of the Southern Andes from seismites recorded in Lago Icalma, Chile, 39°S" (PDF). Palaeogeography, Palaeoclimatology, Palaeoecology. 259 (2–3): 301–322. doi:10.1016/j.palaeo.2007.10.013. hdl:1912/2176.
