= Defensive War =

Strategy in the Arauco War

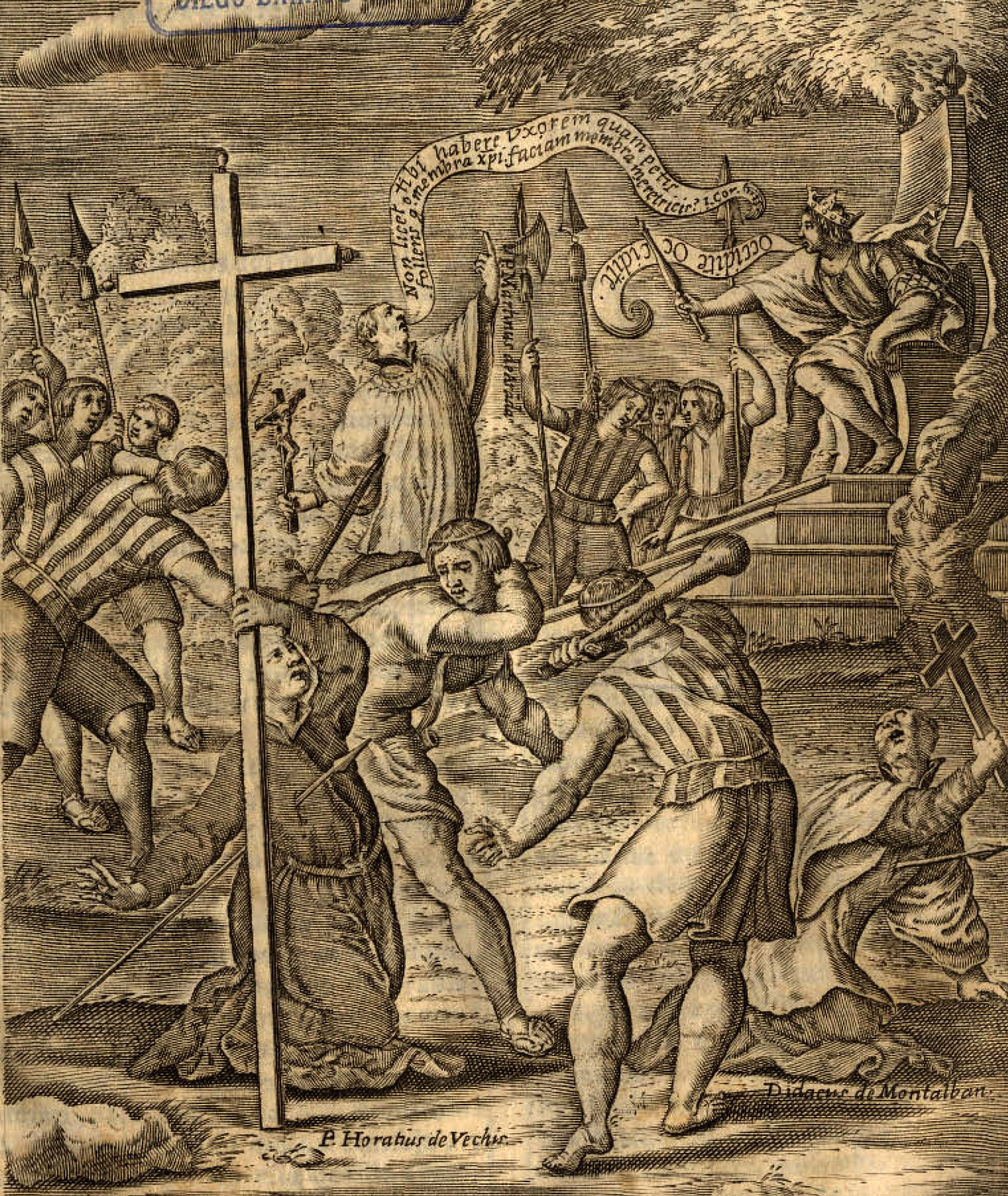
Representation of the Martyrs of Elicura in an engraving within Histórica relación del Reyno de Chile i de las Misiones i Ministterios que exercita la Compañía de Jesús (1646), written by the Jesuit Alonso de Ovalle.

The Defensive War (Spanish: Guerra defensiva) was a strategy and phase in the Arauco War between Spain and independent Mapuches. The idea of the Defensive War was conceived by Jesuit father Luis de Valdivia who sought to diminish hostilities, establish a clear frontier and increase missionary work among the Mapuches. Luis de Valdivia believed the Mapuches could be voluntarily converted to Christianity only if there was peace.

The Defensive War became Spain’s official policy in 1612 when King Philip III decreed it after reading a letter from Valdivia. By the time the Defensive War was established, war between Spain and the Mapuches had been going on for 70 years. Philip III obtained indulgences from Pope Paul V for those who helped pacify Araucanía by non-violent means. To carry out his missionary work Luis de Valdivia recruited eight Jesuits and two coadjutors in Spain to travel to Chile. The Mapuche toqui Anganamón killed three Jesuit missionaries on December 14, 1612 after he learned the Spanish were protecting his two fugitive wives and two of his daughters. The Spanish did so due to the opposition of the Catholic Church to polygamy. The Defensive War remained Spain’s official policy until 1626.

In the book Guerra de Chile, published in 1647, the Defensive War was heavily criticized by maestre de campo and corregidor of Concepción Santiago de Tesillo. De Tesillo claim the Defensive War gave the Mapuche a much needed respite to replenish their forces that should have been denied.
