= Malleco Viaduct =

Railway bridge over the Malleco River in Araucania Region, Chile

Coordinates: 37°57′47″S 72°26′20″W

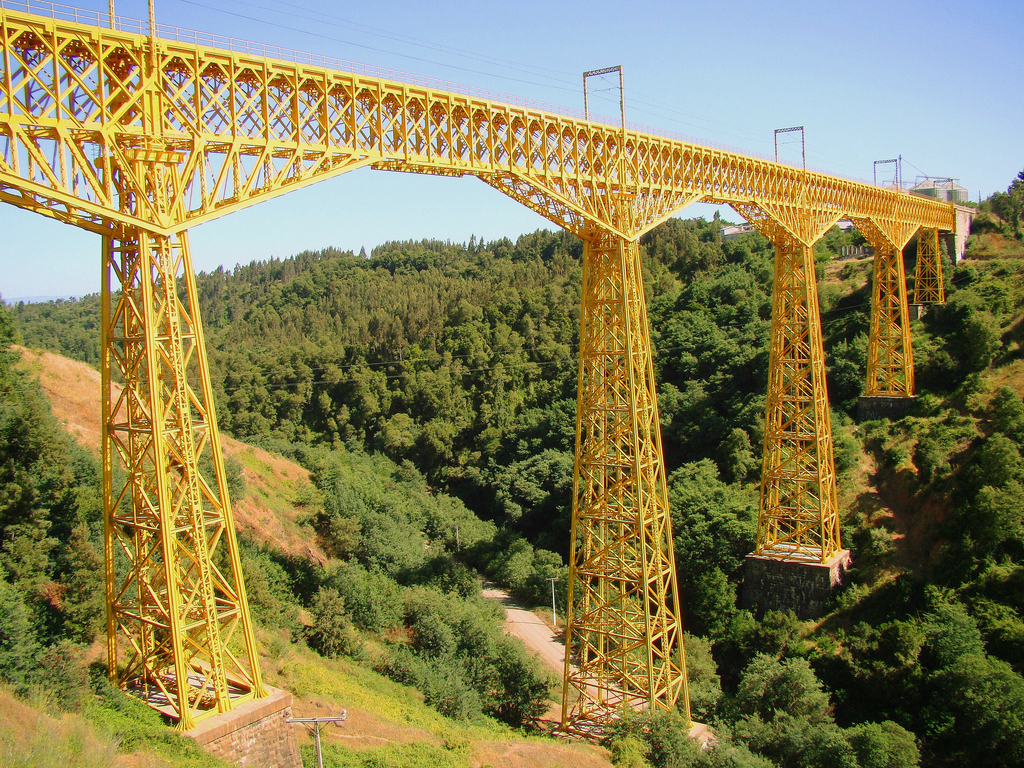
Malleco Viaduct.

Malleco viaduct. View west from a bus, across the Malleco bridge in Route 5 South.

The Malleco Viaduct (Spanish: Viaducto del Malleco) is a railway bridge located in central Chile, passing over the Malleco River valley, south of Collipulli in the Araucania Region. It was opened by President José Manuel Balmaceda on October 26, 1890. At that time, it was the highest such bridge in the world. The Panamerican Highway passes right next to the viaduct.

A popular myth claims that the bridge was designed by Gustave Eiffel. Eiffel made a bridge proposal, but it was rejected by the Chilean authorities. It was designed by Victorino Aurelio Lastarria and the construction of the bridge was awarded to Schneider et Cie. O Le Creusot, another French company. The bridge was declared a national monument in 1990.

The viaduct has often been referred to as a symbol of progress, among others by former President Ricardo Lagos.
