= Icalma Airport =

- IATA: none; ICAO: SCQI

Summary
- Airport type: Public
- Serves: Icalma Lake, Chile
- Elevation AMSL: 3,806 ft / 1,160 m
- Coordinates: 38°44′00″S 71°13′05″W

Map
- Location of Icalma Airport in Chile

Runways
Direction	Length		Surface
Direction	m	ft	Surface
07/25	732	2,402	Grass
- Source: Landings.com Google Maps OurAirports

Icalma Airport (Spanish: Aeropuerto de Icalma, (ICAO: SCQI)) is an airstrip 9 kilometres (5.6 mi) northeast of Icalma Lake, in the Araucanía Region of Chile. The airstrip is 8 kilometres (5.0 mi) from the border with Argentina.

The airstrip is in a generally mountainous and sparsely populated region, with high terrain west of the runway.

== See also ==
- Transport in Chile
- List of airports in Chile
