= Fuerte de Lonquén =

Fuerte de Lonquén (English: Fort Lonquén) was a fort built in 1602 by Governor Alonso de Ribera on the south bank of the Lonquén River nine kilometers from the Itata River. It was established to protect the grain fields and cattle of the local estancias that fed Ribera's Spanish army on La Frontera. Years later a town was established at this point called Nombre de Jesús. By the late 19th century there was only a small village called Lonquén located on the site a few kilometers northwest of the town of Treguaco in the commune of that name in Ñuble Region of Chile.

== Sources ==
- Francisco Solano Asta-Buruaga y Cienfuegos. Diccionario geográfico de la República de Chile, Segunda Edición Corregida y Aumentada, New York: D. Appleton & Company, 1899, p. 384 Lonquén. — Aldea
- Crescente Errázuriz. Seis años de la historia de Chile, p. 78-79
