= Anganamón =

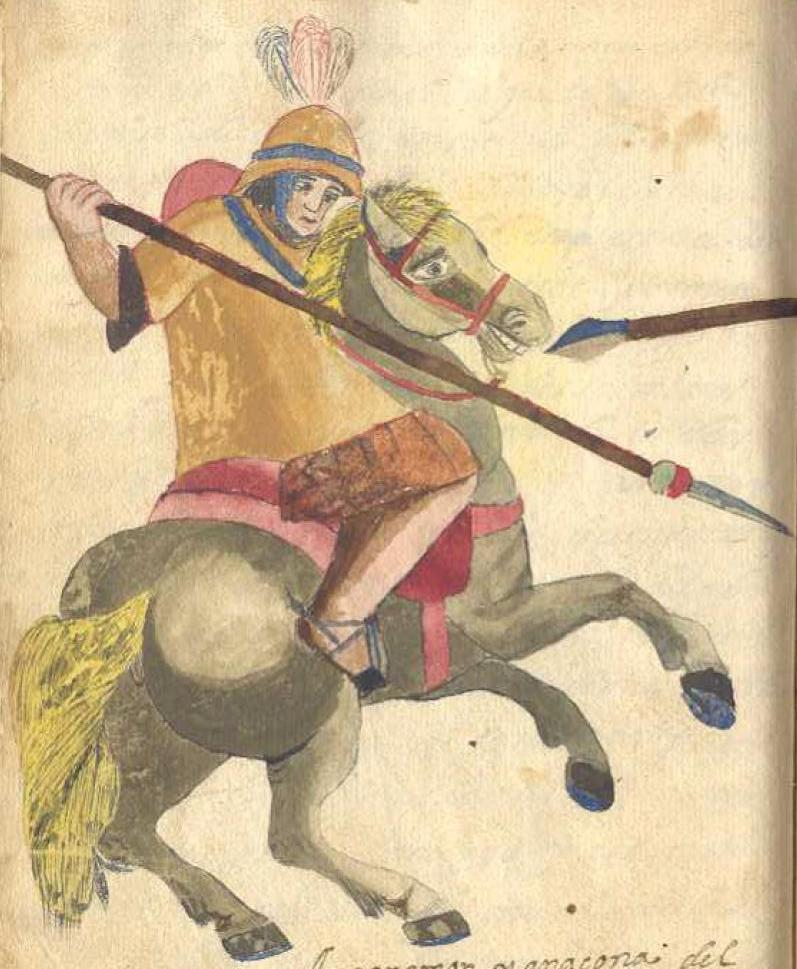
- Anganamón (cropped)
- Rank: Toqui
- Conflicts: Battle of Curalaba

Anganamón, also known as Ancanamon or Ancanamun, was a prominent war leader of the Mapuche during the late sixteenth and early seventeenth centuries and a Toqui from (1612 - 1613). Anganamón was known for his tactical innovation of mounting his infantry to keep up with his cavalry.

Anganamón is said to have participated in the Battle of Curalaba on December 23 of 1598, which killed the Governor of Chile Martín García Oñez de Loyola. In April 1599 he led the attack on Boroa near La Imperial, where six Spanish soldiers and indigenous auxiliaries were killed.
With Pelantaro and Aillavilu II he fought a pitched battle with the troops of Governor Alonso García de Ramón in late 1609. Ramón was victorious but not without great effort. Within two years a new Spanish policy prevailed "Defensive War" inspired by the Jesuit Luis de Valdivia who believed it was a way to end the interminable war with the Mapuche. The Toqui at that time was Anganamón. Valdivia's bid to end the war with the Mapuche foundered following the Martyrdom of Elicura in December 1612, an event in which the spears of Anganamón's men killed priests Horacio Vechi and Diego de Montalvan, Valdivia's emissaries to the Mapuche, in an act of revenge when the Spanish did not return his two wives and two daughters that had escaped to Spanish territory.
