= Lonquén River =

Tributary of Itata River in Chile

The Lonquén River is in the Ñuble Region in the southern part of Central Chile. It forms at the confluence of the esteros Pichimávida and Colomávida that originate in the mountains in the east of the province. Its course lies from north to south, receiving from the west the flow of the esteros of La Huerta, Coipuencillo, El Salto, Coroney, and Ninhue, and from the east tributaries, estero Torrecilla, and other lesser tributaries like the estero Tiuque. The Lonquén then changes direction moving from east to west. In this section, it receives from the north the tributaries of the esteros Ranquil, Cholchol, Reloca, San Jose, and Santa Rosa, and from the south the esteros Corontas, Buenos Aires, Luengos, Cabrería, Molino, and Antequereo. It then empties into the Itata River from its northern bank as the Itata is turning toward the west.

Fort Lonquén was built in 1602 by the Governor Alonso de Ribera on the south bank of the Lonquén River 9 km above its confluence with the Itata River.
