= Fernando Talaverano Gallegos =

Royal Governor of Chile (1563–1619)

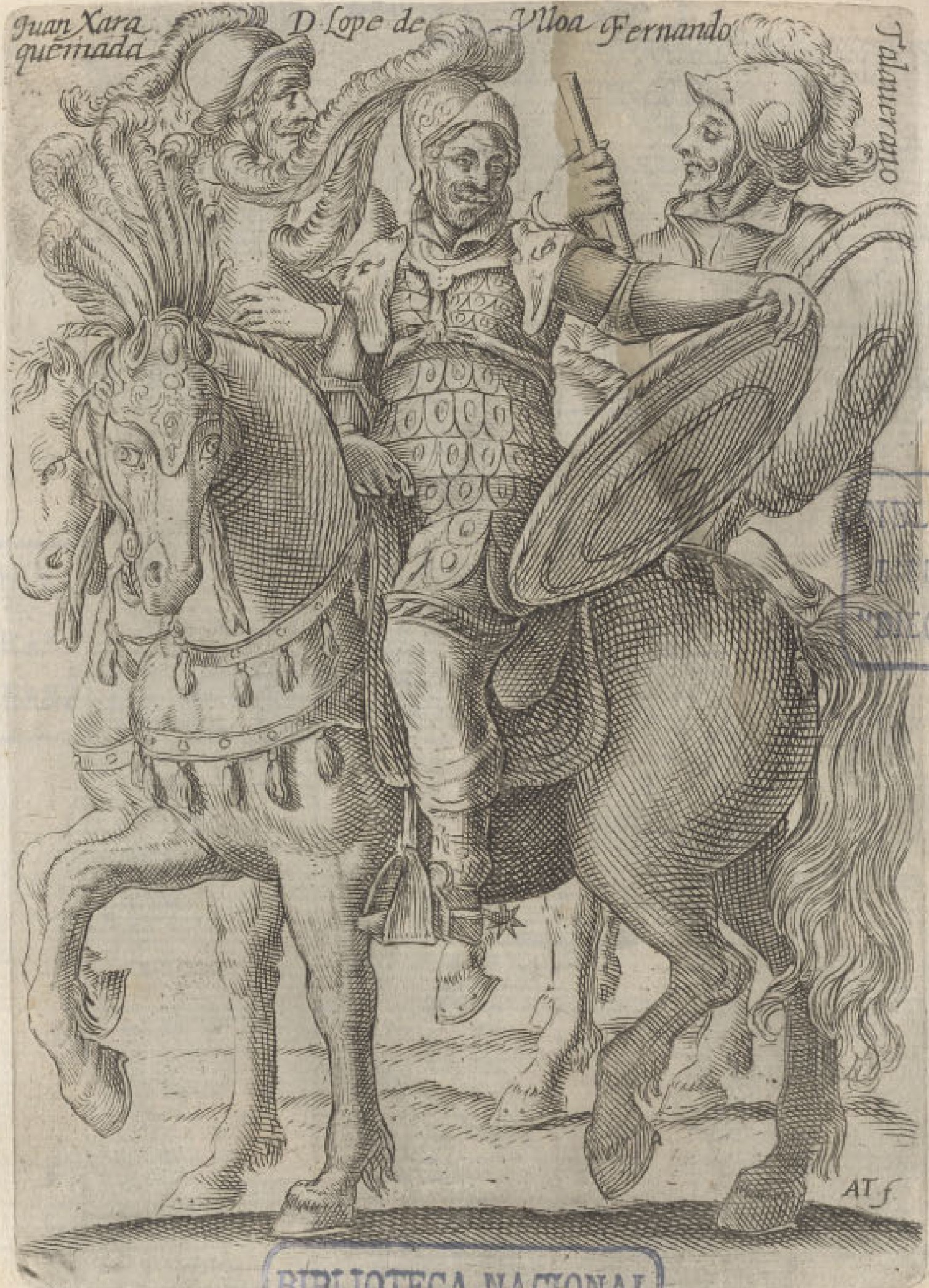
Engraving of three governors of Chile. Fernando Talaverano is shown on the right

Fernando Talaverano Gallegos, also known as Hernando Talaverano (1563, Spain – 1619, Chile); lawyer and Spanish administrator, occupied the position of temporary governor of Chile for ten months after the death of Alonso de Ribera, between March 1617 and January 1618.

== Sources ==
- Medina, José Toribio (1906). Diccionario Biográfico Colonial de Chile (PDF) (in Spanish). Santiago, Chile: Imprenta Elzeviriana. pp. 849–850.

Government offices
Preceded by Alonso de Ribera	Royal Governor of Chile; 1617–1618	Succeeded by Lope de Ulloa
