= Luis Merlo de la Fuente =

Former Royal Governor of Chile

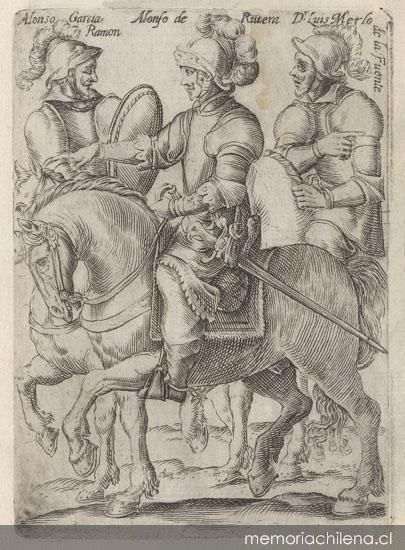
Alonso García Ramón, Alonso de Ribera y Luis Merlo de la Fuente, 1646

Luis Merlo de la Fuente Ruiz de Beteta was a Spanish colonial official who briefly served as the Royal Governor of Chile, in 1610–11.

== Biography ==
He was born in Valdepeñas, Spain to Luis Merlo de la Fuente and Maria Ruiz de Betena. He went to America, specifically Panama, in 1588 in the capacity of an oidor or judge, later travelling to Lima, Peru. From there the viceroy at the time, García Hurtado de Mendoza, 5th Marquis of Cañete, sent him to Santiago, Chile to judge the governor, Alonso de Sotomayor, for possible misconduct.

Later, he travelled as an emissary to various colonial cities. When Philip III wanted to reinstate the Real Audiencia in Chile, he was selected as one of the oidores which compose that type of body. The members of the Audiencia arrived in Santiago by April 24, 1609, and were installed by September 9 of the same year.

Upon the illness of the governor, Alonso García de Ramón, Merlo de la Fuente was eventually designated the successor, and he took command on September 2, 1610. This duty lasted only until January 15, 1611, however. During this period Merlo de la Fuente faced a rising by the Mapuche Indians, who tried to take advantage of the death of the previous governor.

In 1612, he returned to Lima, and in 1620 he retired from the Crown's service.

Government offices
Preceded by Alonso García de Ramón	Royal Governor of Chile; 1610–1611	Succeeded by Juan Jaraquemada
