= Ginés de Lillo =

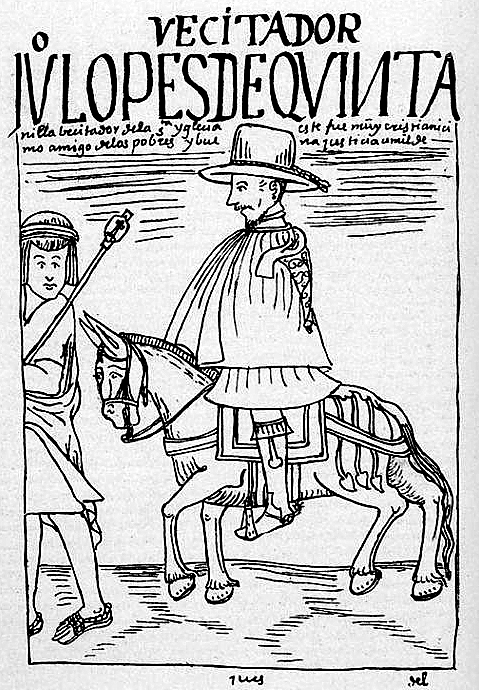
A Spanish visitor

Ginés de Lillo (1566 in Murcia – 24 January 1630 in Arauco), a high-ranking officer in the Spanish army, was in 1603 nominated official visitor to the lands between the towns of Los Cauquenes and Choapa, part of modern-day Chile.

== Visitor to Chile ==
The post was created in 1602 by Governor Alonso de Ribera with the objective of visiting and measuring lands in the hands of Spanish and indigenous people so as to understand the extent of Spanish power in Chile and to classify the extensive and disparate indigenous groups. In this way the Mapuche people could be put to work in the encomienda pseudo-feudal system.

== The renunciation of his predecessors ==
Alonso de Ribera initially named Juan Morales de Negrete official visitor, but he turned the post down; the Governor's second choice was Melchor Jufré del Aguila, but he too was not interested. Thus the title went to Ginés de Lillo.

== Named official visitor ==
On 21 August 1603 Ginés de Lillo began his work in the regions of Ñuñoa, Apoquindo, Manquehue, Vitacura, Tobalaba and Peñalolén. He then proceeded into the foothills of the Andes as far as Maipo before assaying both sides of the road from Colina and Aconcagua, Lo Negrete, Renca and Huechuraba. In 1604 he steered in the direction of Tango, on the northern bank of the Maipo River, Chiñigue, Pomaire, Melipilla, the Puangue valley, Curacaví, Mallarauco and Ibacache, ending in Pudahuel where he stayed as a guest of the Society of Jesus. He then measured the farms of Quilicura owned by Don Bartolomé Blumenthal. The same year he surveyed the sides of the Acuyo (Casablanca) valley from Cuesta de Zapata or Cordillera del Alamo to the sea, ending at Viña del Mar in either the Peuco or the Penco valley.

In 1605 he visited Ocoa and Quillota.

As well as being of use to the Governor, the document de Lillo produced is now a source of historical information on indigenous seats of power in central Chile, their authority and toponymy, as well as the encomienda system and forced movement of these people.

== The case of Bárbola de Oropesa ==
Bárbola de Oropesa, widow of Don Juan, Cacique of Macul, testified that she was 'aggrieved' at the measurement and redistribution of lands visited by Ginés de Lillo in 1603. She was assigned less land than appeared to be lawfully, heritably hers. According to her testimony, she was a soft target and thus chosen to be the loser in an effort to right earlier injustices in land allocation.
