= Pehuenche =

Indigenous ethnic group of Chile and Argentina

pewen
- People: Pehuenche
- Language: Mapudungun
- Country: Pewen mapu

Flag

Pehuenche (or Pewenche) are an Indigenous people of South America. They live in the Andes, primarily in present-day south central Chile and adjacent Argentina. Their name derives from their dependence for food on the seeds of the Araucaria araucana or monkey-puzzle tree (pewen in Mapudungun). In the 16th century, the Pehuenche lived in the mountainous territory from approximately 34 degrees to 40 degrees south. Later they became Araucanized and partially merged with the Mapuche peoples. In the 21st century, they still retain some of their ancestral lands.

Pehuenche groups participated in various armed conflicts in the 17th and 18th centuries, usually by "descending" from the mountains to the western lowlands of Chile. They attacked the Spanish around Maule River in 1657. More than 100 years later, they attacked the Mapuche in January 1767, and the Spanish of Isla del Laja in late 1769.

In the 1860s, amidst the Chilean invasion of Araucanía, the Pehuenche declared themselves neutral. The Pehuenche chief Pichiñán is reported to have spoken against the Moluche, who wanted war, claiming that they engaged in robbery and received just punishments by Chileans for that offense. Historian José Bengoa claims that Pehuenche neutrality was based on the fact that their lands in the Andes were not subject to colonization. But, the encroaching Argentine and Chilean advances were such that in March 1881, Pehuenches assaulted the Argentine outpost of Chos Malal, killing the entire garrison of 25–30 soldiers.

== Culture ==
A Spanish writer first described the Pehuenche in 1558:

These people do not sow. The sustain themselves by hunting in the valleys they occupy. There are many guanacos, jaguars, cougars, foxes, small deer, and mountain cats and birds of many species. They use bows and arrows for hunting. Their houses are four poles covered with skins. They move from place to place and have no permanent habitation...Their clothes are blankets made of animal skins.

That writer did not mention the primary food source of the Pehuenche: the harvest of the seeds of the monkey-puzzle tree (Araucaria araucana), locally called Pehuen.

The Pehuenche adopted horse meat into their diet after feral horses of Spanish origin reached the eastern foothills of the Andes. These herds had developed in the humid pampa, after the Spanish abandoned Buenos Aires the second time in 1541. At first, the Pehuenche hunted horses as any other game, but later they began to raise horses for meat and transport. To preserve horse meat, they sun-dried it to make charqui ("jerky").

Juan Ignacio Molina wrote in his Civic History of the Kingdom of Chile (1787) that the language and religion of the Pehuenche were similar to those of other Mapuche, but he described their dress as distinct. The men wore skirts rather than trousers, as well as earrings and mantillas. Molina described them as nomadic ("vagabond" in his words) and the most industrious and laborious among "all the savages".

== Language ==
The Pehuenche speak Mapundungun today. In the past, they spoke their own distinct language, which may have been Huarpean.

== See also ==
- Galletué Lake
