= Alonso de Cordova y Figueroa =

Alonso de Cordova y Figueroa (? – August 9, 1698) was a Spanish soldier born in Concepción, Chile. He was the son of Alonso de Figueroa y Córdoba and father of the historian Pedro de Cordova y Figueroa. He served as lieutenant, captain of infantry and of cavalry in Lota and San Carlos de Austria; lieutenant general of cavalry and Sargento Mayor of the Captaincy General of Chile.

== Sources ==
- José Toribio Medina, Diccionario biográfico colonial de Chile, Impr. Elziviriana, Santiago, 1906, Pj. 211 CORDOBA Y FIGUEROA (ALONSO DE)
