= Rafael, Chile =

Coordinates: 36°37′S 72°46′W

Rafael is a town in the commune of Tomé, in Concepción Province, in the Biobío Region of Chile.

== History ==
Originally a crossroads on the Camino Real between Concepcion and Chillan and Santiago. It was first the site of a mill on the Pingueral River. On October 24, 1657, Pedro Porter Casanate built a fort San Rafael de Coelemu to protect the Royal roads and secure the Coelemu region from the attacks of the Mapuche. Later a Jesuit encomienda and a church were established there. In 1835, it became the capital of the Department of Coelemu, until the town of Coelemu replaced Rafael as the capital in January 1854. On October 22, 1891, Rafael was made a municipality. On December 30, 1927, it became part of the new Department of Tomé.

== See also ==
- List of towns in Chile

== Sources ==
- Francisco Solano Asta-Buruaga y Cienfuegos, Diccionario geográfico de la República de Chile, 2nd ed, New York, Appleton & Co 1899. pg. 635 Rafael. — Villa
