= Renaico River =

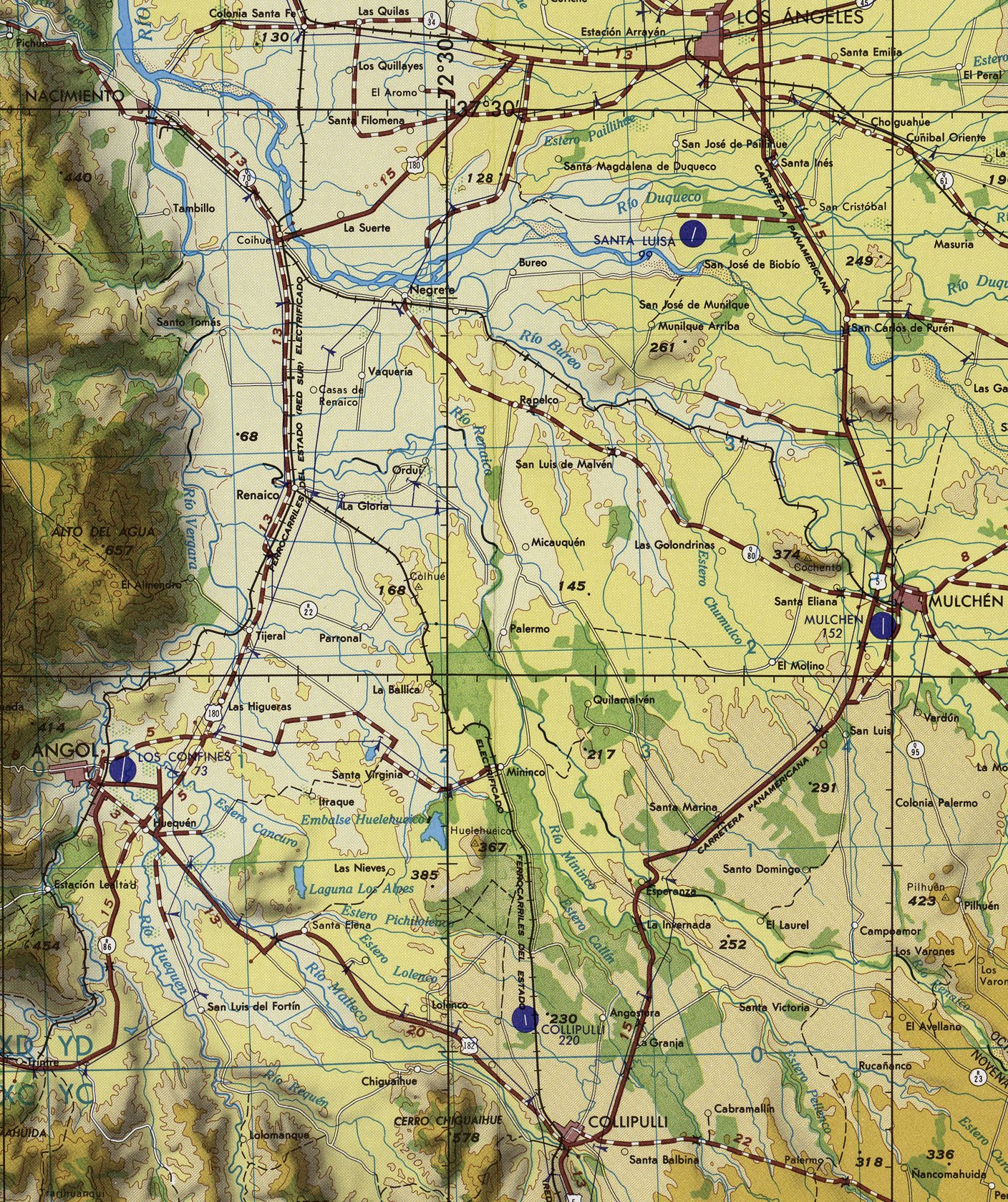

Location
- Country: Chile

Physical characteristics
- Mouth
  - location: Vergara River
- Length: 130 km (81 mi)

The Renaico River is a river that straddles the border between the regions of Bío Bío and La Araucanía in Chile. The Renaico River rises from the northwest flank of Cordillera de Pemehue, a western spur of the Andes Mountains, north of Tolhuaca volcano. In its upper course, the river parallels the east and north border of Malleco National Reserve. The river ends approximately 7 km downstream from the city of Renaico, where it joins the Vergara River.

== Route ==
The Renaico River rises from the northwestern flank of the Pemehue Range, a western range of the Andes, north of the Tolhuaca volcano. In its upper course, the river parallels the eastern and northern boundary of the Malleco National Reserve. The river ends approximately 7 km downstream of the town of Renaico, near the Nahuelbuta mountain range, where it joins the Vergara River.

== See also ==
- List of rivers of Chile
