= Vergara River =

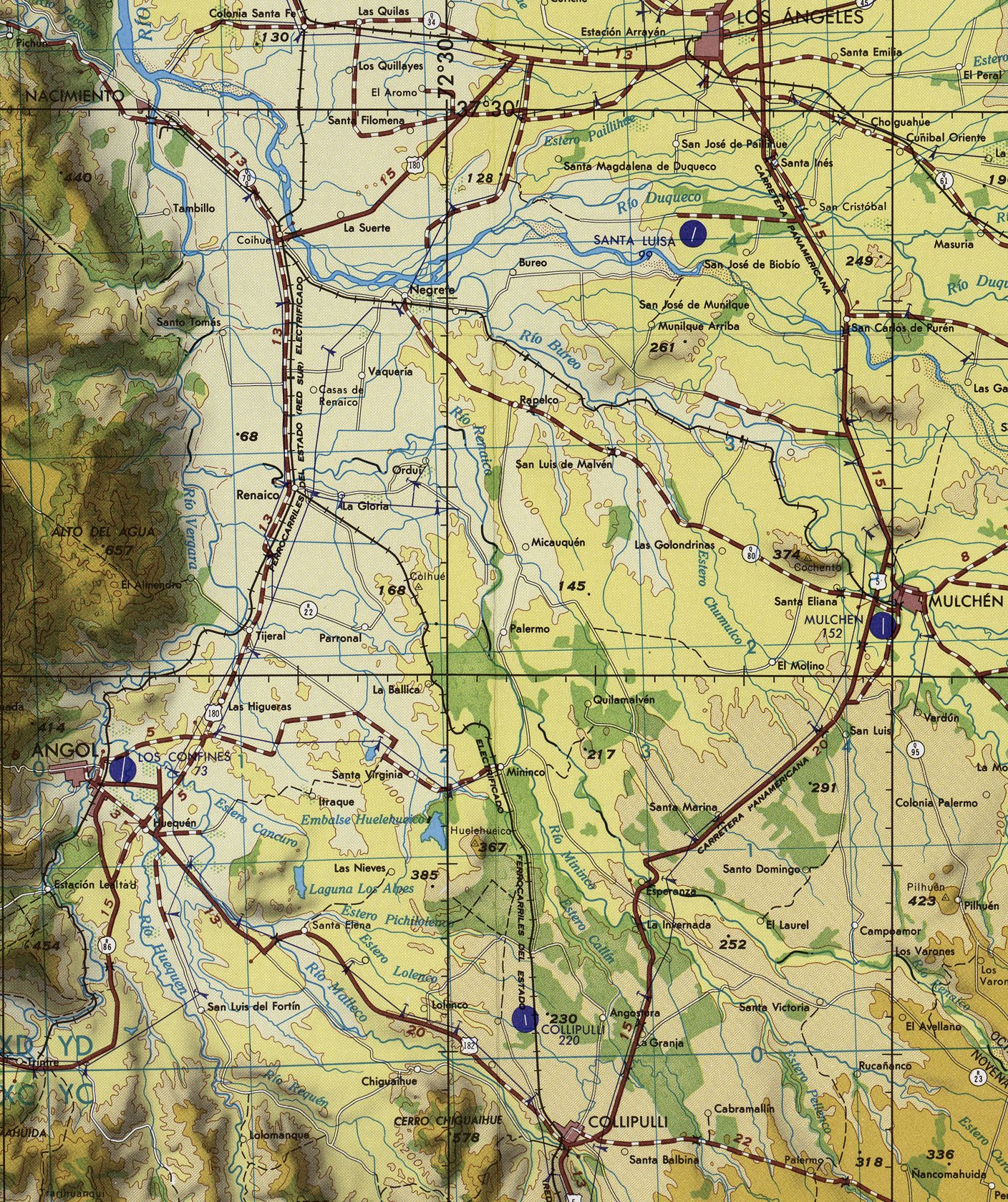
- Malleco River, flows into the Vergara River

Location
- Country: Chile

Physical characteristics
- Source
  - location: junction of the Malleco and Rehue
- Mouth
  - location: Biobío River

The Vergara River is a river located in the Intermediate Depression of Chile. The river rises at the junction of the Malleco and Rehue rivers, close to the city of Angol. The Cordillera de Nahuelbuta barrier forces the river to flow northward. At the latitude of the town of Renaico, the Vergara is joined by its main affluent, the Renaico River. From its confluence with the latter river to its confluence with the Liñeco Creek, the Vergara River marks the boundary between the regions of Bío Bío and La Araucanía.

The town of Nacimiento lies near the confluence with the Biobío River.

== See also ==
- List of rivers of Chile
