= Francisco Astaburuaga Cienfuegos =

Chilean politician and lawyer

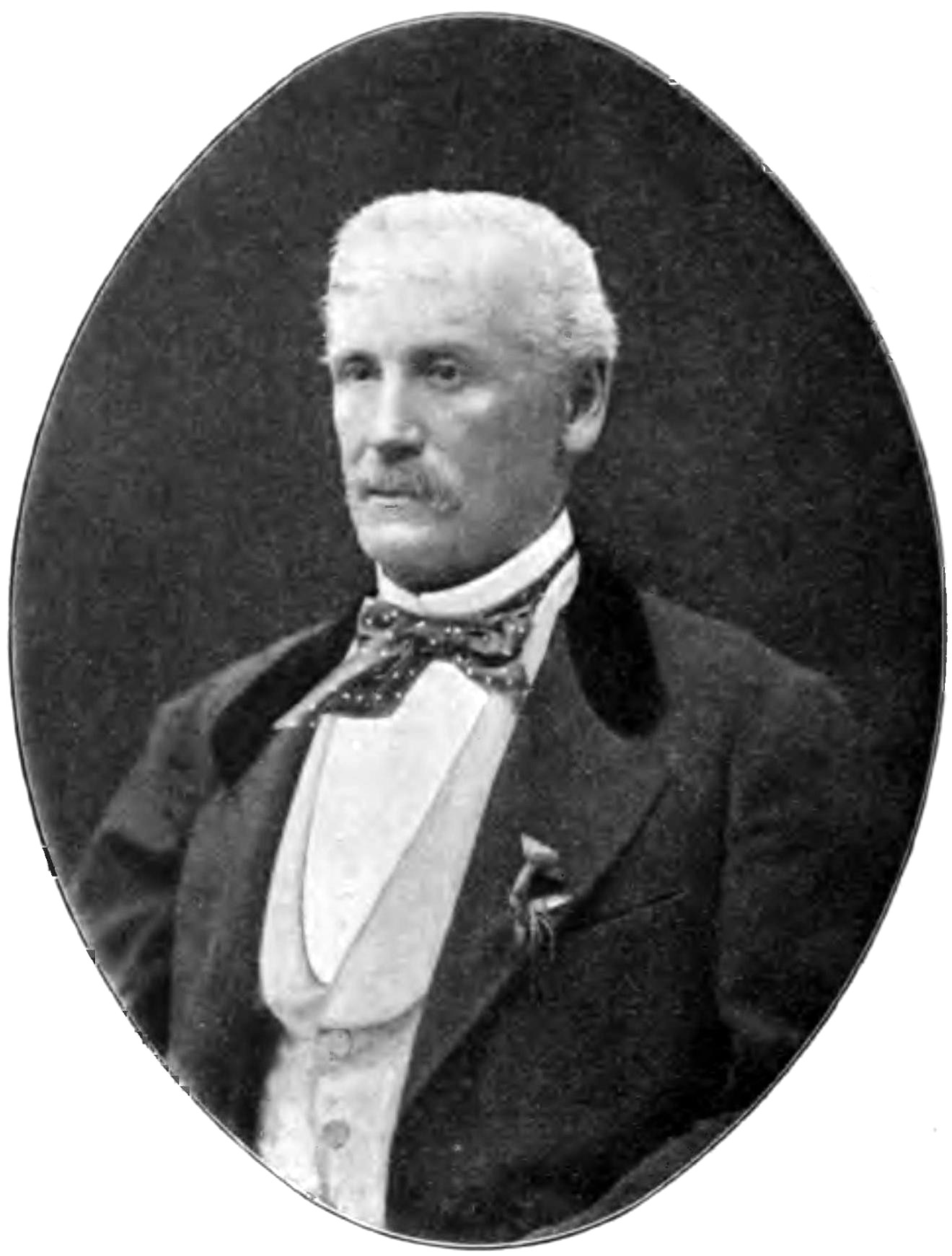
- Born: Francisco Solano Asta-Buruaga y Cienfuegos; July 21, 1817; Talca, Chile
- Died: June 13, 1892 (aged 74)
- Education: Instituto Nacional; Universidad de San Felipe
- Occupations: Politician, lawyer
- Known for: Diccionario Geográfico de la República de Chile (1867)
- Spouse: María del Rosario Vergara Rencoret (m. 1853)
- Parents: Cayetano Astaburuaga Valdovinos (father); Petronila Cienfuegos Silva (mother)

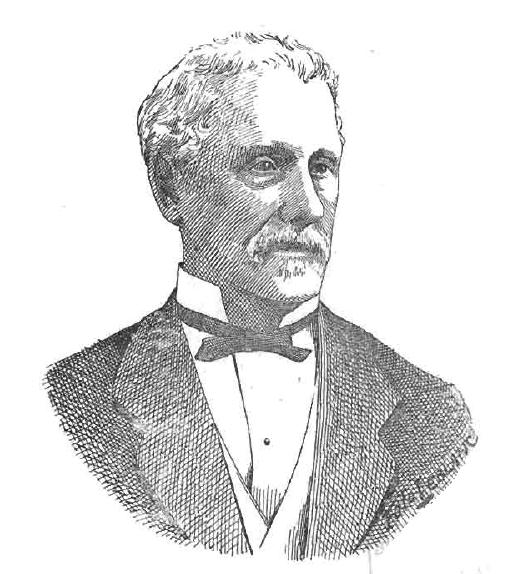
Francisco Asta-Buruaga y Cienfuegos

Francisco Solano Asta-Buruaga y Cienfuegos (July 21, 1817 – June 13, 1892) was a Chilean politician and lawyer.

== Biography ==
Astaburuaga was born in Talca on July 21, 1817. His parents were Cayetano Astaburuaga Valdovinos and Petronila Cienfuegos Silva. He attended Presbítero Juan de Díaz Romo School and Instituto Nacional. After studying law in Universidad de San Felipe he was sworn in as lawyer on September 5, 1832.

Astaburuaga married on June 10, 1853, with María del Rosario Vergara Rencoret.

== Works ==
- Diccionario Geográfico de la República de Chile Santiago, Chile; 1867
