= Luis de Valdivia =

Spanish Jesuit missionary

Luis de Valdivia (Spanish pronunciation: [lwis ðe βalˈðiβja]; 1560 – November 5, 1642) was a Spanish Jesuit missionary who defended the rights of the natives of Chile and pleaded for the reduction of the hostilities with the Mapuches in the Arauco War.

Following the 1598 revolt of the Mapuche in Araucanía and their destruction of seven Spanish cities, Valdivia successfully advocated the establishment of a border, and the replacement of military campaigns by missionary work that, from their point of view, would attempt the religious conquest of the rebellious Mapuche. His campaigns, called the Defensive War, aroused the initial support of the Spanish monarchy, but over the years it was considered a failure and left Valdivia in disrepute.

There are no surviving portraits of him, as he refused that one should be made:

sabiendo que yo trataba de retratarle para consuelo de los que le conocieron en Chile, me llamó y me riñó y me mandó que no lo hiciese, que no era bien que quedase en el mundo memoria de un tan gran pecador... …knowing that I intended to create a portrait of him for the comfort of those who had known him in Chile, he called me over, scolded me, and forbade me to do it, insisting it was not right for the memory of such a great sinner to remain in the world…

== Works ==
Valdivia wrote a grammar, vocabulary and religious texts of the Huarpean languages.

Some of his works include:

- Arte y gramatica general de la lengua que corre en todo el Reyno de Chile : con un vocabulario, y confessionario. [Lima, 1606] Sevilla, 1684.
- Doctrina christiana y cathecismo, confessionario breve, arte y gramática y vocabulario breve en la lengua Allentiac. Lima, 1607.
- Confessionario breve en la lengua del Reyno de Chile, provechoso para confessar a los Indios de Chile y otras personas. Lima, 1616.
- Sermón en lengua de Chile: de los mysterios de nuestra santa fe catholica, para predicarla a los indios infieles del reyno de Chile, dividido en nueve partes pequeñas, acomodadas a su capacidad. Valladolid, 1621.
- Textos Millcayac, Lima, 1607.

Textos Millcayac has been re-published in Márquez (1943) and Tornello et al. (2011).
