= Alonso de Ribera =

Spanish royal Governor of Chile

Don Alonso de Ribera Caballero de Santiago
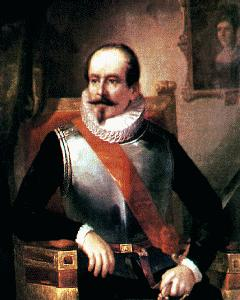

Royal Governor of Chile
- In office 1612–1617
- Monarch: Philip III
- Prime Minister: Duke of Lerma
- Preceded by: Juan Jaraquemada
- Succeeded by: Fernando Talaverano

Royal Governor of Chile
- In office 1601–1605
- Monarch: Philip III
- Prime Minister: Duke of Lerma
- Preceded by: Alonso García de Ramón
- Succeeded by: Alonso García de Ramón

Personal details
- Born: 1560 Úbeda, Spain
- Died: March 9, 1617 (aged 56–57) Concepción, Chile
- Spouse: Inés de Córdoba
- Profession: Brigadier General

Alonso de Ribera y Zambrano (Spanish pronunciation: [aˈlonso ðe riˈβeɾa]; 1560 – March 9, 1617) was a Spanish soldier and twice Spanish royal governor of Chile (1601–1605 and 1612–1617).

== Early life ==
Born in Úbeda, he was the illegitimate son of Hidalgo and Captain Jorge de Ribera Zambrana y Dávalos, who claimed descent from the kings of Aragon.

After studying mathematics, Ribera joined the Spanish army in Flanders. It was the beginning of a long and successful military career. He fought in various battles in France with Alexander Farnese, Duke of Parma. In addition, he was part of the Spanish Armada of 1588, and one of the followers of Cardinal Archduke Alberto, governor of the Netherlands.

His distinguished military service came to the attention of King Philip III. In 1599, the king named him governor and captain general of Chile, positions that he occupied from 1601 to 1605 and again from 1612 to 1617.

== First royal government of Chile ==
The 1598 Disaster of Curalaba, in which the Spanish governor of Chile, Martín García Óñez de Loyola, was killed in a surprise attack by Mapuche Indians in southern Chile, had led to the abandonment of the cities of Santa Cruz de Óñez, La Imperial, Valdivia, Osorno, Angol, Villarrica, and all the other Spanish positions south of the Bío-Bío River. Even Chillán was temporarily depopulated, and the fort of Arauco and Concepción were besieged by Mapuches under Pelantaru.

The Spanish defense of the colony consisted mostly of a citizen militia, not considered adequate by the authorities. With the aim of improving the army, they wanted a governor with military experience. For this reason, Alonso de Ribera received the appointment, with the mandate of organizing a professional army.

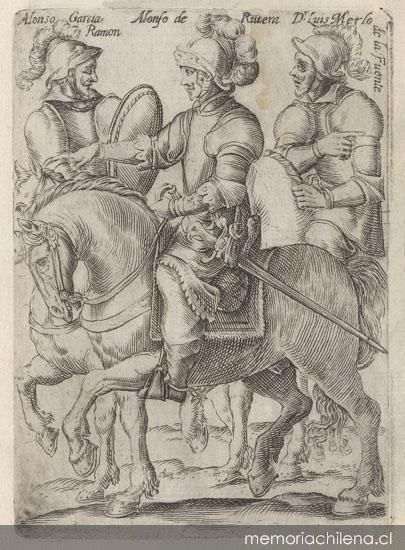
Alonso García Ramón, Alonso de Ribera and Luis Merlo de la Fuente, 1646

He sailed from Seville in April 1600, with 300 men. Upon his arrival in America, he met with ex-Governor Alonso de Sotomayor, who briefed him on the situation in Chile and the Arauco War. He continued on to Peru, finally arriving at Concepción in February 1601.

After his arrival, and after an evaluation of the state of the military, Ribera wrote: "...these people were more poorly disciplined and more uninformed in military things than I ever could have believed." In 1604, he created a permanent army of 1,500 men, paid from royal revenues in Peru, the Real Situado. His strategic plan was to concentrate the Spanish forces in a series of forts along the frontier and consolidate Spanish power, which could then be advanced to the south. In his first period of government, he was able to advance into Mapuche territory and construct 19 forts.

He also organized the colonial property in and around Santiago. In August 1603, he designated Ginés de Lillo to conduct a general inspection of all the land, delineating the private properties granted by the governors and the cabildo (city government), to cut down on constant litigation.

The governor was also concerned about the situation of the Indians subjected to the encomienda system, and took steps to limit their abuse by the Spanish. For example, he prohibited the custom of Spanish women riding to mass or on visits in litters carried by Indians. He established new regulations for the mines, which allowed forced indigenous labor for eight months, but followed by a period of two years, four months before the same worker could be forced to return.

=== Trial of grievances and removal from office ===
Ribera, accustomed to the rich court life of Flanders, scandalized the more austere colonial society by introducing such things as grand banquets and parties, card-playing, sumptuous suits, and at table, the heretofore unknown fork. These novelties, together with the fact that Ribera had married a Crilla woman without the prior permission of the king, cost him a loss of prestige and ultimately forced him from office in 1605.

He was subjected to a juicio de residencia, or trial of grievances. The accusations against him were that he dealt rudely with soldiers, opened other people's correspondence, granted special favors to the relatives of his wife, played games of chance, persecuted two clergymen, and was not religious.

After leaving the government, he was transferred to Córdoba with his family. He remained there until 1612, when he again became governor of Chile.

=== Second government of Chile and death ===
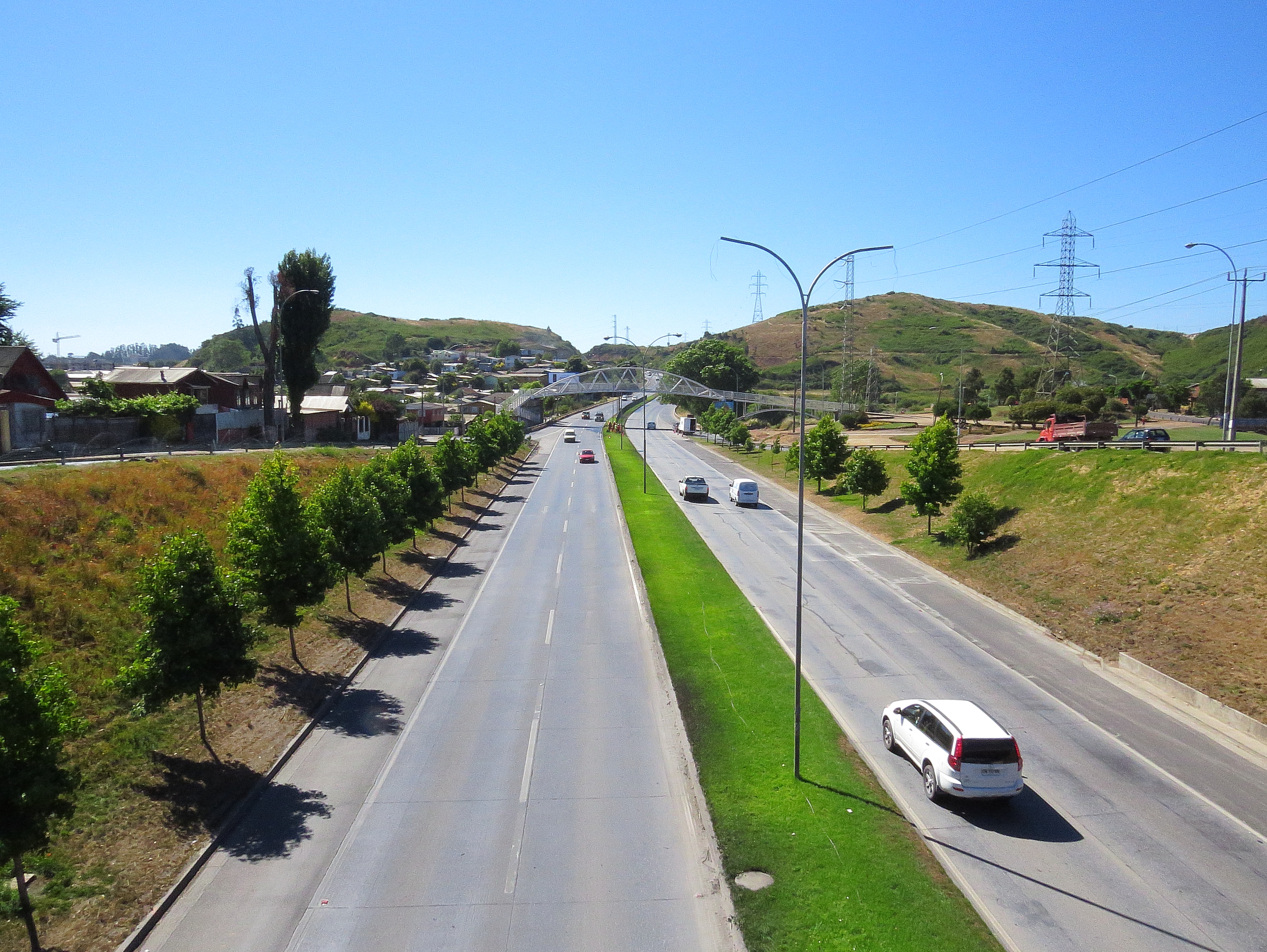
Alonso de Ribera highway in Chile

He returned as governor in 1612. Father Luis de Valdivia had specifically requested his appointment from King Philip III. Valdivia was the originator of a new system of defensive warfare in Chile. He planned a static frontier separating the Spanish zone from the Indigenous zone, permitting no one but missionaries to enter the south from the Spanish side. The king was in agreement, and although Ribera himself did not totally agree, he followed the royal orders and established the defensive system.

However, after the death of missionaries sent into the Indigenous zone by Father Valdivia, Ribera became convinced that the system was a failure. The previously warm relationship between the priest and the governor cooled.

Among Ribera's tasks in his second term was the defense of the Chilean coast from attacks by Dutch corsairs, beginning in 1613. One such expedition was a fleet of six ships sent by the Dutch East India Company to the Moluccas, via the Strait of Magellan. This fleet was under the command of Admiral Joris van Spilbergen. As soon as the governor was informed of the approach of Spilbergen, he ordered the fortification of Valparaíso and Concepción. Spilbergen did not attack the Chilean coast, but sailed past it to the north.

During Ribera's administration, on January 29, 1616, an expedition under the command of Jacob Le Maire, and with Wilhelm Cornelisz Schouten as pilot, discovered Cape Horn.

Governor Alonso de Ribera died in Concepción on March 9, 1617.

Government offices
Preceded by Alonso García de Ramón	Royal Governor of Chile; 1601–1605	Succeeded by Alonso García de Ramón
Preceded by Juan Jaraquemada	Royal Governor of Chile; 1612–1617	Succeeded by Fernando Talaverano
