= Biobío River =

River in Chile

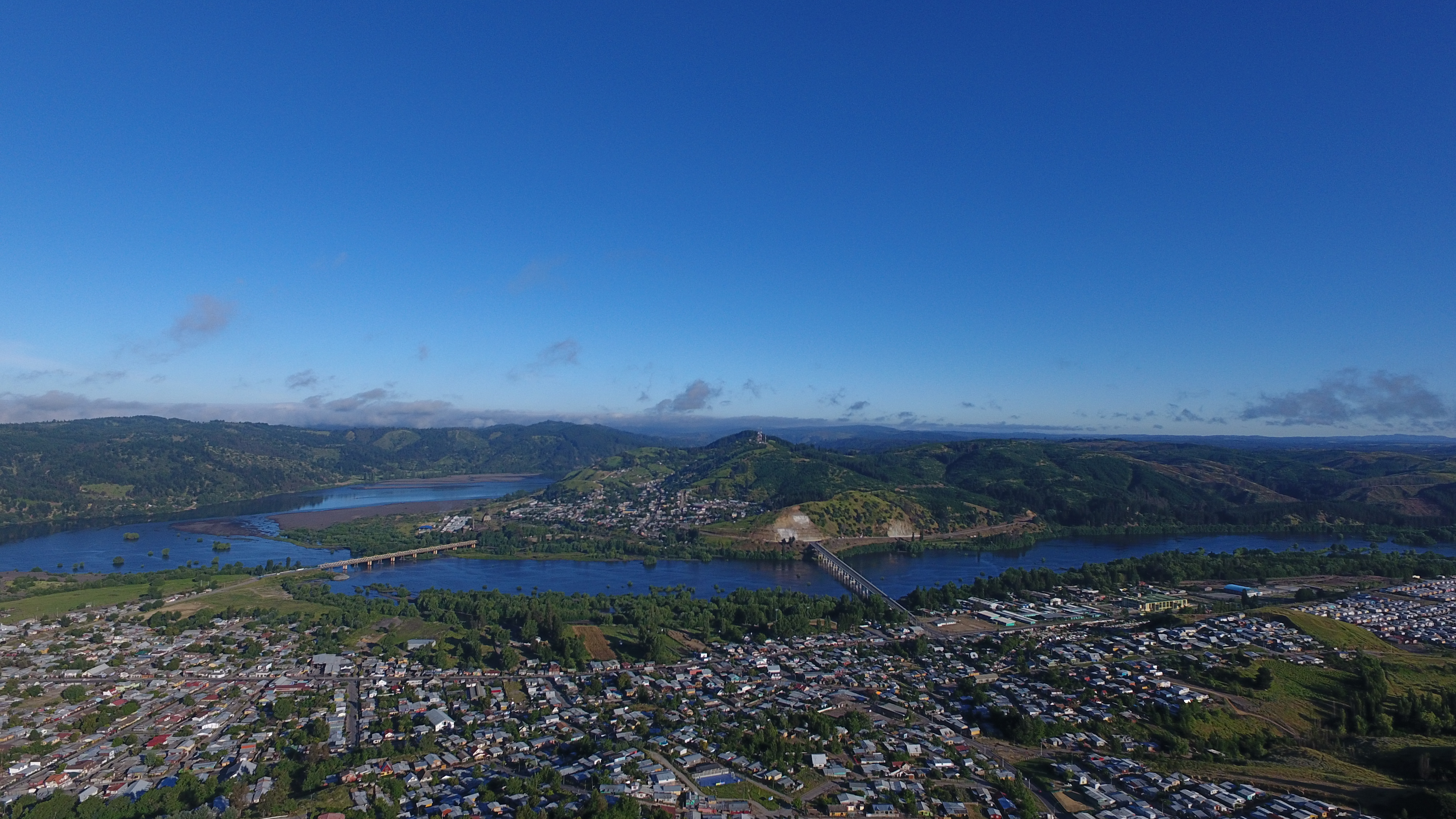
- Confluence of Biobío and Laja rivers at Laja

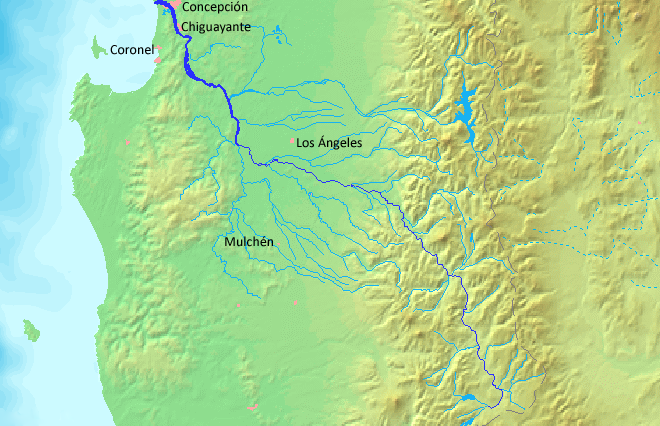
- Map of Biobío River showing its main tributaries

Location
- Country: Chile

Physical characteristics
- Source
  - location: Galletué Lake
  - elevation: 1,160 m (3,810 ft)
- Mouth
  - location: Gulf of Arauco (in Spanish), Pacific Ocean
  - coordinates: 36°48′50″S 73°10′14″W
- Length: 380 km (240 mi)
- Basin size: 24,264 km^{2} (9,368 sq mi)
- Discharge
  - average: 899 m^{3}/s (31,700 cu ft/s)

The Biobío River (also known as Bío Bío or Bio-Bio) is the second largest river in Chile. It originates at Icalma and Galletué lakes in the Andes and flows 380 kilometres (236 mi) to the Gulf of Arauco (in Spanish) on the Pacific Ocean.

The major tributaries of the river are the Malleco and the Laja. The river is Chile's second-longest river (the longest being the Loa River) and the Biobío basin is Chile's third largest watershed, after the Loa and Baker basins. The river is also the widest river in Chile, with an average width of 1 kilometre (0.6 mi). In the Metropolitan area of Concepción, four bridges cross the river: Biobío Railroad Bridge (1889), Juan Pablo II Bridge (1973), Llacolén Bridge (2000) and Bicentennial Bridge (2010).

== Course ==
The Biobío River originates at the east shore of Galletué Lake. The river flows east for a few kilometers to the point where it receives the waters of the nearby Icalma Lake, through a short stream. It then turns its course northwestward, meandering through a broad Andean valley and merging with some minor tributaries, such as the Lonquimay and the Rahue. The Lonquimay is fed by some glaciers of Sierra Nevada and passes close to the town of the same name. Just downstream from the confluence with the Rahue, the upper course of the river-locally known as Alto Bío Bío-begins to run rapidly through a narrow valley surrounded by mountains, the path becoming increasingly sloped. Then the river, along the lower course of its tributaries in this area, is impounded by Ralco Dam. Below the dam, the river skirts a southwestern spur of Callaqui volcano before falling into Pangue Reservoir.

After reaching the Intermediate Depression, the river flows through a mostly flat area, being joined by the Duqueco and Bureo Rivers, increasing its width between 60 and 120 metres (200 and 390 ft) and reducing its speed, allowing navigation in some zones. In the middle course, the Vergara River joins the Biobío near Nacimiento, draining a substantial part of southern river basin after receiving the waters of the Malleco, Renaico and Rahue Rivers, which constitute a northwest-oriented and parallel drainage network to the Biobío of a great part of the northern Andean portion of the Araucanía Region.

Below the Vergara River, the Biobío is joined by the Tavolevo River, flowing east from the Nahuelbuta Range, the Guaqui River coming from the east in the Andes foothills, and the small Rele River coming from the west from the northern part of the eastern slopes of the Nahuelbuta Range.

To the east of the Chilean Coastal Range, near the cities of San Rosendo and La Laja, the Biobío River is joined by the Laja River, its major tributary in terms of volume of water. From here, the river follows its course increasing its width considerably, reaching 2 kilometres (1.25 mi) wide at its mouth on Pacific Ocean, near San Pedro de la Paz, Gran Concepción. Along the way, the Quilacoya River joins the Biobío River on its north bank 9 kilometres (5.6 mi) above the town of Hualqui.

=== Diego Díaz Island ===
Diego Díaz Island
- Interactive map of Diego Díaz Island

Geography
- Adjacent to: Biobío River
- Region: Biobío
- Province: Biobío
- Commune: Los Ángeles

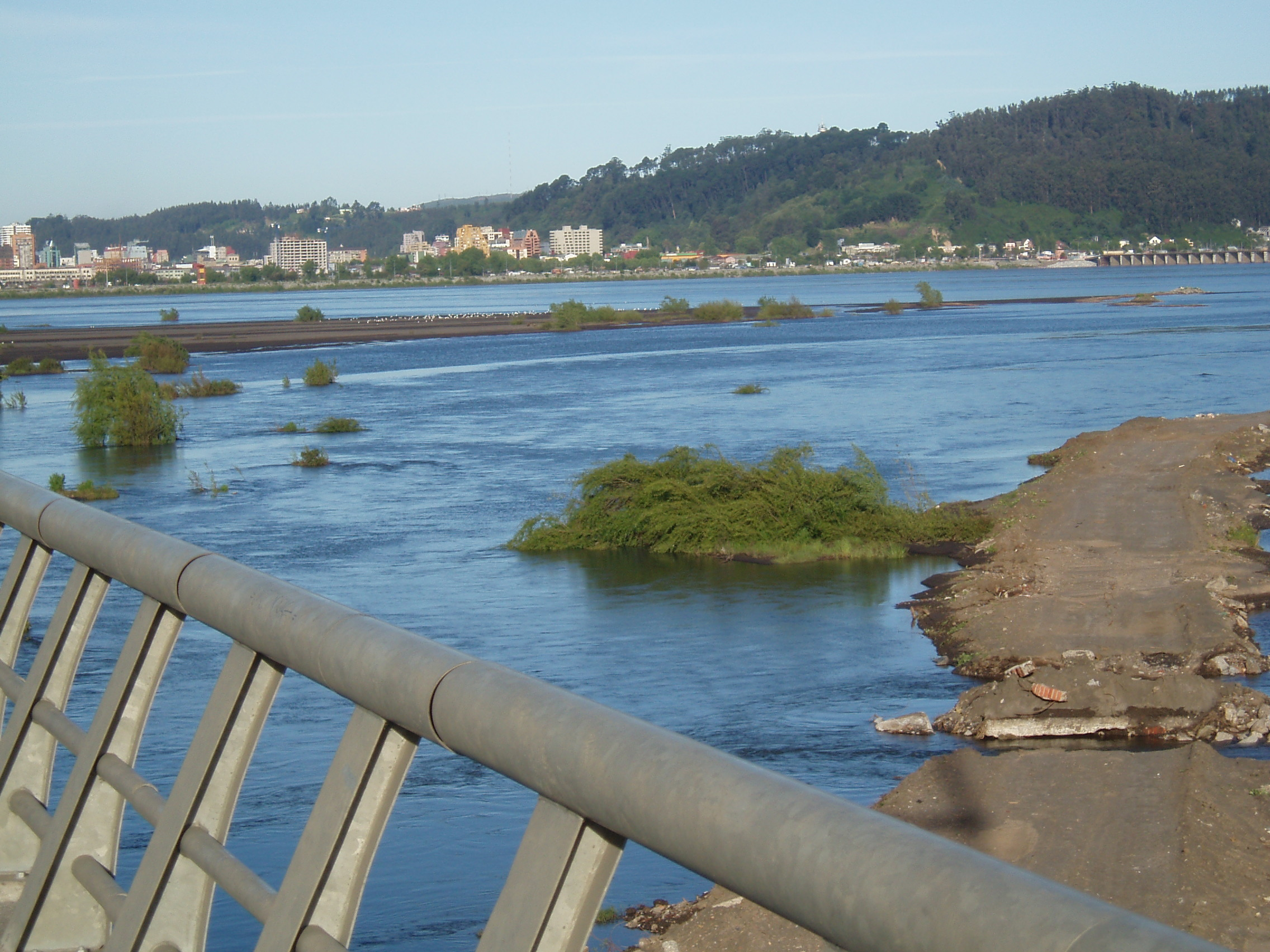
The Biobío at Concepción close to where it meets the sea

Diego Díaz Island (Spanish: Isla Diego Díaz) is a river island in Biobío River located near Colonia Santa Fe. The river next to the island was navigated, upstream and downstream, in colonial times. In 1610, during the Arauco War, Mapuches attacked the Spanish in the island and killed 13 soldiers.

== History ==
The name "Biobío" comes from Mapudungun, the Mapuche language. The Biobío was the traditional borderline, or "La Frontera", during the later part of the War of Arauco between La Araucanía, the southern Mapuche self-ruled areas and northern Spanish-ruled Captaincy General of Chile. The territory south of the river was not incorporated into the Chilean state until the 1880s after the campaigns of the "Pacification of Araucanía".

In the past, the river was navigable by ship up to the city of Nacimiento. However, deforestation during the 1900s led to heavy erosion that choked the river with silt and made it untraversable to boats.

In the early 1980s, it was renowned as being one of the world's best whitewater rafting venues, with a trip that lasted seven days through some of Chile's wilderness areas. Endesa, the Chilean state-run power company at that time, constructed the Pangue Dam, despite strong protests by environmentalists. With the loss of the whitewater rafting venue, displacement of indigenous Pehuenche people, who had lived in the area for centuries, also occurred.

== Sources ==
- This article draws partially on the corresponding article in the Spanish-language Wikipedia, accessed July 10, 2007.
- EVALUACION DE LOS RECURSOS HIDRICOS SUPERFICIALES EN LA CUENCA DEL RIO BIO BIO

37°29′45″S 72°37′38″W
