= List of rivers of La Araucanía Region =

The information regarding List of rivers in the Araucanía Region on this page has been compiled from the data supplied by GeoNames. It includes all features named "Rio", "Canal", "Arroyo", "Estero" and those Feature Code is associated with a stream of water. (Note: The arbitrarily selected codes are RPDS, CHN, CNLA, CNLB, CNLD, CNLI, CNLN, CNLSB, CRKT, DTCH, DTCHI, DTCHD, ESTY, FORD, SBED, STM, STMA, STMB, STMC, STMD, STMH, STMI, STMIX, STMM, STMQ, STMS, STMSB, STMX, TNLC, WTRC, WTRH) This list contains 662 water streams.

== Content ==
This list contains:

1. Name of the stream, in Spanish Language
2. Coordinates are latitude and longitude of the feature in ± decimal degrees, at the mouth of the stream
3. Link to a map including the Geonameid (a number which uniquely identifies a Geoname feature)
4. Feature Code explained in
5. Other names for the same feature, if any
6. Basin countries additional to Chile, if any

== List ==
Rivers of the Bío Bío and Araucanía Regions

(Some rivers flow in 2 regions, e.g. Araucania and Bío Bío Regions, like Tirúa, Lleulleu and others. Bío-Bío River, flows in the Bío-Bío Region, but some tributaries flows also in the Araucania Region. For overview we repeat here the complete Bío-Bío Drainage system, and the simple rivers that cross the regions)

- Río Tirúa • 38.34303°S 73.50092°W • 3869760 • STM (Araucania)
- Río Lleulleu • 38.08017°S 73.45428°W • 3882908 • STM (Araucania)
- Río Biobío • 36.81667°S 73.16667°W • 3898379 • STM • (Rio Biobio, Río Biobío)

- Estero Quilacoya • 37.0498°S 72.96557°W • 3874265 • STM
- Río Laja • 37.26875°S 72.72159°W • 3885501 • STM • (Rio Laja, Rio de La Laja, Río Laja, Río de La Laja)

- Río Claro • 37.23266°S 72.64257°W • 3894566 • STM
- Río Rucúe • 37.3°S 71.95°W • 3872723 • STM
- Río Polcura • 37.33026°S 71.54914°W • 3875526 • STM

- Río Rele • 37.2789°S 72.73007°W • 3873516 • STM
- Río Huaqui • 37.37131°S 72.66762°W • 3887767 • STM • (Rio Guaque, Rio Guaqui, Rio Huaqui, Río Guaque, Río Guaqui, Río Huaqui)

- Río Rarinco • 37.39275°S 72.50385°W • 3873687 • STM

- Tavolevo River

- Río Culenco • 37.46769°S 72.73759°W • 3893050 • STM
- Río Nicodahue • 37.59582°S 72.83979°W • 3878688 • STM (Araucania)

- Río La Esperanza • 37.59017°S 72.85242°W • 3885996 • STM (Araucania)
- Estero Maitenrehue • 37.59659°S 72.83443°W • 3880915 • STM • (Arroyo Maitenrehue, Estero Maitenrehue) (Araucania)

- Río Vergara • 37.49118°S 72.66716°W • 3868385 • STM (Araucania)

- Río Renaico • 37.6648°S 72.65033°W • 3873457 • STM

- Río Mininco • 37.67313°S 71.99511°W • 3879769 • STM

- Río Malleco • 37.7806°S 72.69741°W • 3880840 • STM • (Rio Malleco, Río Malleco) (Araucania)

- Río Huequén • 37.78694°S 72.68361°W • 3887625 • STM • (Rio Hueque, Rio Huequen, Río Hueque, Río Huequén) (Araucania)

- Río Rahue • 38.39776°S 71.24218°W • 3873851 • STM (Araucania)

- Río Picoiquén • 37.79975°S 72.70506°W • 3876204 • STM (Araucania)

- Río Bureo • 37.58039°S 72.50296°W • 3897711 • STM

- Río Mulchén • 37.7202°S 72.26028°W • 3879199 • STM

- Río Duqueco • 37.56685°S 72.49134°W • 3892136 • STM
- Estero Lirquén • 36.70833°S 72.975°W • 3965538 • STM
- Queuco River
- Río Lonquimay • 38.43502°S 71.23282°W • 3882532 • STM • (Rio Lonquimai, Rio Lonquimay, Río Lonquimai, Río Lonquimay) (Araucania)

—List of rivers--

- Estero del Salto • 38.35864°S 72.52193°W • 3872508 • STM • (Estero El Salto, Estero del Salto)
- Estero Púa • 38.3649°S 72.46976°W • 3875121 • STM
- Estero Rucaco • 38.39933°S 73.14807°W • 3872747 • STM
- Estero Quilaco • 38.41302°S 72.61239°W • 3874268 • STM
- Estero Rehuecoyán • 38.41421°S 72.51154°W • 3873539 • STM • (Estero Coyan, Estero Coyán, Estero Rehuecoyan, Estero Rehuecoyán)
- Río Perquenco • 38.4265°S 72.63998°W • 3876479 • STM • (Estero Perquenco, Rio Perquenco, Río Perquenco)
- Estero Ruca Pehuen • 38.45021°S 73.23757°W • 3872737 • STM
- Estero Guamaqui • 38.46188°S 72.98786°W • 3888512 • STM
- Arroyo Palo Santo • 38.4823°S 73.32115°W • 3877534 • STM • (Arroyo Palo Santo, Estero Palo Santo)
- Río Captrén • 38.49214°S 71.86974°W • 3896823 • STM • (Estero Catren, Rio Captren, Rio Catren, Río Captrén, Río Catrén)
- Río Repucura • 38.4941°S 72.87096°W • 3873421 • STM
- Arroyo Coiparahue • 38.86667°S 71.26667°W • 3860906 • STM • (Arroyo Coiparahue) • (AR, CL)
- Río Boroa • 39.2367°S 73.16228°W • 3898023 • STM
- Estero Guindos • 39.29857°S 73.1819°W • 3888257 • STM
- Estero Putros • 39.42428°S 72.25272°W • 3874544 • STM
- Río Chuengane • 39.42456°S 72.2521°W • 3894767 • STM
- Estero Chanleufú • 39.42966°S 72.43956°W • 3895457 • STM
- Estero Quillén • 39.43176°S 72.79008°W • 3874131 • STM
- Estero de los Pantanos • 37.62097°S 72.80865°W • 3877292 • STM
- Estero de las Minas • 37.65937°S 72.93446°W • 3879814 • STM
- Estero Quicho • 37.66229°S 72.96462°W • 3874295 • STM
- Estero de los Pantanos • 37.66308°S 72.86961°W • 3877293 • STM
- Estero Pino Hueco • 37.67003°S 72.95935°W • 3875906 • STM
- Estero Palo Botado • 37.67067°S 72.9583°W • 3877567 • STM • (Arroyo Palo Botado, Estero Palo Botado)
- Estero del Molino • 37.68163°S 72.6372°W • 3879596 • STM
- Estero El Pangal • 37.70201°S 72.92882°W • 3890841 • STM
- Estero Recinto • 37.7036°S 72.63723°W • 3873637 • STM
- Estero del Tijeral • 37.72938°S 72.6161°W • 3869854 • STM
- Estero Itraque • 37.73485°S 72.62606°W • 3887021 • STM
- Estero Quinahueco • 37.75268°S 72.68196°W • 3874055 • STM
- Estero de Pellomenco • 37.75801°S 72.70323°W • 3876749 • STM
- Río Mininco • 37.76565°S 72.46243°W • 3879767 • STM
- Estero de las Minas • 37.77464°S 72.69842°W • 3879813 • STM
- Estero Coicoimallín • 37.7799°S 72.92128°W • 3894428 • STM • (Estero Coicoimallin, Estero Coicoimallín, Estero Coicomallin, Estero Coicomallín)
- Río Rehue • 37.78077°S 72.69807°W • 3873540 • STM
- Estero de Loanco • 37.79792°S 72.89319°W • 3882808 • STM • (Estero de Loanco, Estero de Lonco)
- Estero Los Lleulles • 37.8008°S 72.78726°W • 3881913 • STM
- Estero Cancura • 37.8041°S 72.63796°W • 3896974 • STM
- Estero Ñipaco • 37.82997°S 72.66596°W • 3878617 • STM • (Estero Nipaco, Estero Nitaco, Estero Ñipaco)
- Estero Deuco • 37.84474°S 72.72921°W • 3892546 • STM
- Estero de las Niñas • 37.84849°S 72.75747°W • 3878632 • STM
- Estero Lolenco • 37.86342°S 72.60109°W • 3882660 • STM
- Estero Pichilolenco • 37.8634°S 72.56075°W • 3876244 • STM
- Estero Troncura • 37.88206°S 72.69723°W • 3869044 • STM
- Estero El Mulo • 37.89638°S 72.33023°W • 3890921 • STM
- Estero Mininco • 37.90158°S 72.74208°W • 3879770 • STM
- Estero Reñico • 37.90296°S 73.02058°W • 3873438 • STM • (Estero Penico, Estero Peñico, Estero Renico, Estero Reñico)
- Estero Chacahue • 37.90685°S 72.3221°W • 3895791 • STM
- Estero Enulhueco • 37.91611°S 72.76731°W • 3890027 • STM • (Estero Emulhueco, Estero Enulhueco)
- Estero Ñanco • 37.92848°S 72.27531°W • 3879055 • STM
- Río Ñanco • 37.92856°S 72.27535°W • 3879050 • STM • (Estero Manco, Estero Nanco, Estero Ñanco, Rio Nanco, Río Ñanco)
- Estero Rahuelanco • 37.93104°S 72.31378°W • 3873849 • STM
- Río Requen • 37.93213°S 72.6327°W • 3873418 • STM
- Estero Curaco • 37.93385°S 72.24466°W • 3892927 • STM
- Estero Calcaco • 37.93395°S 72.24506°W • 3897328 • STM
- Estero Pemulemu • 37.95335°S 72.21434°W • 3876726 • STM
- Estero Queuque • 37.95834°S 72.81381°W • 3874309 • STM
- Estero Pichicallín • 37.95919°S 72.36107°W • 3876304 • STM
- Estero Arquen • 37.96385°S 72.96179°W • 3899319 • STM
- Estero Cahuentué • 37.97759°S 72.91603°W • 3897443 • STM
- Estero Curihueque • 37.99849°S 71.98901°W • 3892867 • STM
- Estero Luanrelún • 38.01276°S 72.05449°W • 3881231 • STM • (Estero Luanrelun, Estero Luanrelún, Quebrada La Bruja)
- Estero Raqui • 38.01667°S 72.66667°W • 3873699 • STM
- Estero Pilihue • 38.01667°S 72.83333°W • 3875998 • STM
- Estero Panqueco • 38.01667°S 72.58333°W • 3877316 • STM
- Estero Lilipulli • 38.01667°S 72.76667°W • 3883219 • STM
- Estero Bolleco • 38.01754°S 73.06126°W • 3898120 • STM
- Estero Guadaba • 38.01911°S 72.94025°W • 3888623 • STM
- Estero Quilanco • 38.02096°S 72.94038°W • 3874247 • STM • (Estero Ininco, Estero Quilanco)
- Estero Nupangui • 38.02413°S 72.57678°W • 3878428 • STM
- Estero Cherquenco • 38.0267°S 72.51772°W • 3895234 • STM • (Estero Chequenco, Estero Chequénco, Estero Cherquenco)
- Estero Pelehue • 38.02972°S 72.75286°W • 3876780 • STM • (Estero Napanir, Estero Naponir, Estero Pelehue)
- Estero Pidenco • 38.03201°S 72.51066°W • 3876172 • STM
- Estero Vedaco • 38.03333°S 72.7°W • 3868552 • STM • (Estero Pellehue, Estero Vedaco) • (CL)
- Estero Pelahuenco • 38.03333°S 71.33333°W • 3876808 • STM
- Estero Curanco • 38.03333°S 72.78333°W • 3892896 • STM
- Estero de Moncol • 38.0371°S 71.10104°W • 3879527 • STM • (Estero de Moncol, Rio Moncol, Río Moncol)
- Río Collochue • 38.03743°S 71.08253°W • 3894173 • STM
- Estero Chicauco • 38.0409°S 72.48185°W • 3895215 • STM
- Estero Chequén • 38.04148°S 72.48069°W • 3895241 • STM
- Estero Huentraico • 38.04468°S 72.70884°W • 3887642 • STM
- Río Cato • 38.04715°S 71.92766°W • 3896149 • STM
- Río Ralco • 38.05006°S 71.32795°W • 3873838 • STM
- Estero del Salto • 38.05088°S 72.32187°W • 3872509 • STM • (Estero El Salto, Estero del Salto)
- Río Quile • 38.05343°S 71.24417°W • 3874225 • STM
- Estero Guallalí • 38.05558°S 71.28302°W • 3888543 • STM
- Río Chaquilvin • 38.06646°S 71.34944°W • 3895399 • STM • (Rio Chaquillin, Rio Chaquilvin, Río Chaquillin, Río Chaquilvin)
- Estero La Mina • 38.06667°S 72.96667°W • 3885329 • STM
- Estero Curanilahue • 38.06667°S 72.86667°W • 3892890 • STM
- Estero Cullinco • 38.06667°S 72.45°W • 3893027 • STM
- Estero Polucos • 38.06889°S 72.44631°W • 3875486 • STM
- Río Chamichaco • 38.06961°S 72.38641°W • 3895590 • STM
- Río Amargos • 38.07591°S 71.87176°W • 3899830 • STM
- Estero Curaco • 38.07717°S 72.44415°W • 3892926 • STM
- Estero Tumarcuicui • 38.08197°S 72.43327°W • 3868943 • STM
- Río Pichiamar • 38.08781°S 71.85335°W • 3876309 • STM
- Estero Trecacura • 38.09109°S 72.74037°W • 3869258 • STM
- Río Pailahueque • 38.09183°S 72.35792°W • 3877759 • STM
- Estero Lualahue • 38.09552°S 72.73185°W • 3881234 • STM
- Estero del Catrimalal • 38.09608°S 72.72694°W • 3896139 • STM
- Río Lomín • 38.10002°S 71.39737°W • 3882590 • STM
- Estero Chacaico • 38.1028°S 72.40921°W • 3895786 • STM • (Estero Chacaico, Estero Cullinco)
- Río Reñico • 38.10616°S 72.60126°W • 3873435 • STM
- Estero Ranquilco • 38.10714°S 72.88909°W • 3873733 • STM
- Estero Jordán • 38.1072°S 72.04917°W • 3886871 • STM
- Estero Lolohue • 38.10985°S 72.70463°W • 3882656 • STM • (Estero Lolahue, Estero Lolohue)
- Estero Panqueto • 38.11019°S 72.54998°W • 3877306 • STM
- Estero Coipué • 38.11033°S 72.63415°W • 3894351 • STM
- Estero Coilaco • 38.11122°S 72.56077°W • 3894381 • STM
- Río Raquín • 38.11128°S 72.56728°W • 3873696 • STM
- Estero Pichico • 38.11357°S 72.97283°W • 3876294 • STM
- Estero Rallinco • 38.1152°S 72.52893°W • 3873830 • STM
- Estero Rucacalquin • 38.11615°S 72.62978°W • 3872748 • STM
- Estero Quetraltué • 38.12002°S 72.86972°W • 3874331 • STM
- Río Lolco • 38.12228°S 71.41348°W • 3882670 • STM • (Estero Lolco, Quebrada El Volantin, Quebrada El Volantín, Rio Lolca, Rio Lolco, Rio Nolco, Río Lolca, Río Lolco, Río Nolco)
- Estero Bolleco • 38.12265°S 72.94621°W • 3898119 • STM
- Estero Curavipi • 38.12602°S 72.64805°W • 3892879 • STM
- Río Pelchue • 38.13296°S 71.08279°W • 3876796 • STM
- Estero Hueico • 38.13333°S 72.9°W • 3887723 • STM
- Estero Temumeo • 38.1°S 72.63333°W • 3870006 • STM
- Estero Lingue • 38.1°S 72.96667°W • 3883132 • STM
- Estero Rucanuco • 38.13983°S 72.94124°W • 3872739 • STM
- Estero Pinilmapu • 38.14743°S 72.93604°W • 3875912 • STM
- Estero Meco • 38.15363°S 72.61759°W • 3880245 • STM
- Estero Toscas • 38.15°S 73.03333°W • 3869460 • STM
- Estero Pichi-Cautín • 38.1588°S 72.89814°W • 3876301 • STM
- Estero Piedras Rojas • 38.16322°S 71.4281°W • 3876054 • STM
- Río Pichi Lumaco • 38.16498°S 72.89981°W • 3876242 • STM
- Estero Quilaco • 38.16667°S 72.8°W • 3874270 • STM
- Estero Esperanza • 38.16667°S 73°W • 3889839 • STM
- Estero Paso Malo • 38.16788°S 72.64178°W • 3877084 • STM
- Río Niblinto • 38.17196°S 71.95485°W • 3878692 • STM
- Río Llanquén • 38.17279°S 71.31285°W • 3882959 • STM
- Estero Layenco • 38.1739°S 72.59712°W • 3883483 • STM
- Estero Las Toscas • 38.17844°S 72.29815°W • 3883849 • STM
- Estero Ronquillo • 38.18001°S 72.36495°W • 3872850 • STM
- Estero Reñico • 38.18086°S 72.88006°W • 3873437 • STM
- Estero Pihun • 38.18333°S 72.98333°W • 3876031 • STM
- Estero Remeco • 38.18686°S 72.6139°W • 3873497 • STM
- Estero Chingue • 38.19049°S 72.61546°W • 3895010 • STM
- Estero Colo • 38.1905°S 72.40915°W • 3894160 • STM
- Estero Quilquilco • 38.19132°S 72.39243°W • 3874081 • STM
- Río Rucausey • 38.1934°S 71.06922°W • 3872725 • STM
- Río Dumo • 38.19586°S 72.42201°W • 3892152 • STM
- Río Pichi-Malleco • 38.19722°S 71.92968°W • 3876241 • STM
- Río Las Nalcas • 38.21164°S 71.45602°W • 3884140 • STM • (Estero Nalca, Estero Naloa, Rio Las Nalcas, Río Las Nalcas)
- Estero Quilapan • 38.21167°S 72.47516°W • 3874238 • STM
- Estero Cuncura • 38.21843°S 71.30177°W • 3892969 • STM
- Estero Idaico • 38.22569°S 73.11173°W • 3887376 • STM
- Estero del Tabaco • 38.22974°S 71.30975°W • 3870403 • STM
- Estero Collahue • 38.22979°S 72.10082°W • 3894218 • STM
- Estero de Los Temos • 38.2479°S 72.61449°W • 3881338 • STM
- Estero de Lancú • 38.25281°S 71.46951°W • 3885248 • STM
- Estero Gualcutemu • 38.25°S 72.93333°W • 3888551 • STM
- Estero Epucheguin • 38.25524°S 71.93926°W • 3890023 • STM • (Estero Epucheguin, Quebrada Bellavista)
- Estero Mallenco • 38.25568°S 72.42491°W • 3880839 • STM
- Estero Chanco • 38.25625°S 72.93297°W • 3895487 • STM
- Estero Lehueluan • 38.25656°S 72.74004°W • 3883433 • STM • (Estero Lahuelan, Estero Lehueluan)
- Estero Liuque • 38.25697°S 72.74053°W • 3883057 • STM • (Estero Lauque, Estero Liuque, Estero Llanque)
- Estero Collipulli • 38.25783°S 72.95006°W • 3894176 • STM
- Estero Conquehue • 38.26417°S 72.26584°W • 3893736 • STM
- Estero Ancatraro • 38.26667°S 72.98333°W • 3899732 • STM
- Río Ránquil • 38.27094°S 71.31729°W • 3873737 • STM
- Estero Boñipen • 38.27228°S 71.36212°W • 3898075 • STM
- Estero Llopinco • 38.28333°S 72.88333°W • 3882838 • STM
- Estero Lumaquina • 38.28458°S 72.89381°W • 3881169 • STM
- Río Pehuenco • 38.28482°S 71.32088°W • 3876874 • STM
- Estero Pilenechico • 38.28562°S 72.17811°W • 3876008 • STM
- Estero Sin Nombre • 38.287°S 72.5559°W • 3870837 • STM
- Río Relún • 38.28884°S 73.20605°W • 3873502 • STM
- Estero Quilaco • 38.28903°S 72.12748°W • 3874269 • STM
- Estero Curilebu • 38.28987°S 73.20613°W • 3892862 • STM
- Estero Manzano • 38.29321°S 72.49732°W • 3880613 • STM
- Estero Liucura • 38.29858°S 72.52501°W • 3883062 • STM
- Estero Tricauco • 38.29979°S 72.67424°W • 3869107 • STM
- Estero Banchuto • 38.30406°S 71.33648°W • 3898859 • STM
- Estero Huillinlebu • 38.30439°S 72.30981°W • 3887524 • STM
- Estero Treinta Ganchos • 38.30577°S 73.16198°W • 3869247 • STM • (Estero Ganchos, Estero Los Ganchos, Estero Treinta Ganchos)
- Estero Medahue • 38.31567°S 72.26138°W • 3880241 • STM
- Estero Ñanco • 38.31575°S 72.58243°W • 3879054 • STM
- Estero Tuco • 38.31667°S 72.78333°W • 3868979 • STM
- Estero Soldado • 38.31667°S 72.98333°W • 3870726 • STM
- Estero Llullun • 38.31667°S 72.8°W • 3882830 • STM
- Estero Guiña • 38.31667°S 72.96667°W • 3888263 • STM
- Estero Chanco • 38.31668°S 72.64834°W • 3895486 • STM • (Estero Chanco, Estero Coihueco)
- Estero Rillahueco • 38.32135°S 72.78727°W • 3873301 • STM
- Estero Machihueco • 38.324°S 72.74433°W • 3881095 • STM
- Río Traiguén • 38.32485°S 72.7146°W • 3869370 • STM
- Estero Ruca Ruca • 38.32811°S 73.24392°W • 3872731 • STM
- Estero Lolenco • 38.33057°S 72.89727°W • 3882659 • STM
- Estero Tahuao Mallín • 38.3332°S 71.08275°W • 3870337 • STM
- Estero Temulemu • 38.33746°S 72.83706°W • 3870007 • STM
- Estero Ñirepu • 38.3406°S 72.20749°W • 3878601 • STM
- Estero de Las Tablas • 38.34504°S 71.94303°W • 3883908 • STM
- Cajón Chico • 38.3468°S 71.3384°W • 3895199 • STM • (Cajon Chico, Cajón Chico, Estero Cajon Chico)
- Cajón Grande • 38.34724°S 71.33835°W • 3888832 • STM • (Cajon Grande, Cajón Grande, Estero Cajon Grande)
- Estero Coihueco • 38.34864°S 72.84861°W • 3894396 • STM • (Estero Coihueco, Estero Loihueco)
- Río Pulul • 38.34879°S 71.15709°W • 3874853 • STM
- Estero Percán • 38.35°S 72.93333°W • 3876538 • STM • (Estero Pencon, Estero Percan, Estero Percán) • (CL)
- Estero Carinancagua • 38.35464°S 71.16498°W • 3896656 • STM • (Estero Carinancagua, Estero Cormancagua)
- Estero Trovoltrovolco • 38.35479°S 73.2518°W • 3869027 • STM
- Estero Pichi • 38.35879°S 72.96632°W • 3876312 • STM
- Estero El Águila • 38.36315°S 71.71706°W • 3892042 • STM
- Estero Negro • 38.36708°S 71.72052°W • 3878811 • STM
- Estero Ñirreco • 38.37199°S 71.25341°W • 3878596 • STM • (Estero Chilpeco, Estero Mirreco, Estero Nireco, Estero Nirreco, Estero Ñireco, Estero Ñirreco)
- Estero Pehuenco • 38.3743°S 72.13061°W • 3876876 • STM
- Estero Caracol • 38.37654°S 71.68982°W • 3896795 • STM
- Estero Esquilluco • 38.37929°S 73.08402°W • 3889778 • STM
- Estero Radalco • 38.38015°S 72.00079°W • 3873865 • STM
- Estero Nihuinco • 38.38333°S 71.95°W • 3878656 • STM
- Estero Ranquilco • 38.38621°S 72.85616°W • 3873732 • STM
- Río Chanquin • 38.39442°S 73.21174°W • 3895451 • STM • (Estero Chanquin, Rio Chanquin, Río Chanquin)
- Estero Chilco • 38.39512°S 73.13577°W • 3895127 • STM
- Estero Pillunmamilco • 38.40791°S 72.20326°W • 3875972 • STM
- Estero Illinco • 38.40874°S 73.38683°W • 3887341 • STM
- Estero Bancocura • 38.41026°S 71.21378°W • 3898856 • STM
- Estero Macha • 38.41032°S 73.35422°W • 3881108 • STM
- Estero Pillahuenco • 38.41466°S 72.72426°W • 3875992 • STM • (Estero Pellahuenco, Estero Pillahuenco)
- Estero Colliguanqui • 38.41552°S 72.06581°W • 3894198 • STM • (Estero Coliguanqui, Estero Colliguanqui, Estero Collihuanqui)
- Estero Ñereco • 38.41667°S 72.26667°W • 3878595 • STM • (Estero Nereco, Estero Nirca, Estero Ñereco, Estero Ñirca)
- Estero Cucao • 38.41667°S 73°W • 3893184 • STM • (Estero Coral, Estero Cucao) • (CL)
- Estero Challacura • 38.41667°S 72.45°W • 3895612 • STM
- Estero Poipoico • 38.41672°S 72.16458°W • 3875548 • STM
- Estero Bulluco • 38.42028°S 72.63526°W • 3897725 • STM • (Estero Balluco, Estero Bulluco)
- Estero Blanco • 38.42036°S 73.34282°W • 3898240 • STM
- Estero Maitenco • 38.4219°S 72.25607°W • 3880934 • STM
- Estero Rarirruca • 38.42455°S 72.02442°W • 3873685 • STM
- Estero Cajón • 38.42512°S 72.08626°W • 3897393 • STM
- Río Montiglio • 38.42808°S 71.89948°W • 3879415 • STM
- Estero Santa Ana • 38.43289°S 73.3289°W • 3871670 • STM
- Estero Ellallicura • 38.4349°S 72.25785°W • 3891196 • STM
- Río Dillo • 38.43752°S 71.95156°W • 3892431 • STM
- Estero Ononoco • 38.4°S 72.95°W • 3878059 • STM
- Estero Curilahue • 38.4°S 72.61667°W • 3892863 • STM
- Río Cayulafquen • 38.43937°S 71.36694°W • 3896062 • STM
- Río Lumaco • 38.44474°S 72.91289°W • 3881171 • STM
- Estero Ononoco • 38.44497°S 72.91194°W • 3878058 • STM
- Estero Madilhue • 38.44682°S 72.98725°W • 3881054 • STM
- Estero Colorado • 38.44962°S 71.51603°W • 3894052 • STM
- Estero Vallerenco • 38.4528°S 72.61109°W • 3868628 • STM
- Río Negro • 38.45541°S 71.86687°W • 3878783 • STM
- Estero Meco • 38.45574°S 72.23807°W • 3880244 • STM
- Río Naranjo • 38.4604°S 71.35121°W • 3879019 • STM
- Río Pellahuén • 38.4611°S 72.98845°W • 3876755 • STM
- Río Indio • 38.46221°S 71.74489°W • 3887248 • STM
- Estero Allinco • 38.46452°S 72.8539°W • 3900072 • STM
- Estero Collanco • 38.46541°S 72.59164°W • 3894213 • STM • (Arroyo Coyanco, Estero Collanco, Estero Coyanco)
- Estero Ñanco • 38.46725°S 71.77155°W • 3879053 • STM
- Estero Manito • 38.46844°S 73.32369°W • 3880697 • STM
- Estero Nielol • 38.46861°S 72.71126°W • 3878674 • STM
- Río Cayunco • 38.47098°S 71.36401°W • 3896057 • STM
- Estero Manzanillo • 38.47114°S 71.61257°W • 3880631 • STM • (Estero Manzanillo, Rio Coloradito, Río Coloradito)
- Estero Pitraco • 38.47188°S 72.58286°W • 3875756 • STM
- Estero Lefuco • 38.47277°S 71.79095°W • 3883437 • STM
- Estero Vergara • 38.47318°S 71.65327°W • 3868392 • STM
- Estero Quiñaco • 38.47381°S 72.32226°W • 3874059 • STM
- Río Lolén • 38.47494°S 71.23773°W • 3882664 • STM
- Estero del Salto • 38.47529°S 71.37141°W • 3872507 • STM • (El Salto, Estero del Salto)
- Estero Boyacura • 38.47826°S 73.05926°W • 3897983 • STM • (Estero Bolacura, Estero Boyacura)
- Río Agrio • 38.47907°S 71.54702°W • 3900624 • STM • (Rio Agrio, Rio El Agrio, Río Agrio, Río El Agrio)
- Estero Chumil • 38.47997°S 72.20474°W • 3894729 • STM
- Río El Caracol • 38.48003°S 71.575°W • 3891760 • STM
- Estero Collico • 38.48044°S 71.88511°W • 3894200 • STM
- Estero Pelhuenco • 38.48046°S 71.57633°W • 3876774 • STM • (Estero Blanco, Estero Pelhuenco)
- Estero Monlu • 38.48333°S 72.76667°W • 3879508 • STM
- Estero Collícura • 38.48333°S 71.66667°W • 3894199 • STM
- Estero Coihueco • 38.48333°S 72.03333°W • 3894395 • STM
- Estero Chacaracón • 38.48422°S 72.72291°W • 3895770 • STM • (Estero Chacanacon, Estero Chacanacón, Estero Chacaracon, Estero Chacaracón, Estero Chacayracon)
- Estero Ventrenco • 38.48774°S 72.02611°W • 3868459 • STM
- Estero Antucol • 38.48908°S 72.89113°W • 3899521 • STM
- Estero Coyanco • 38.48924°S 72.23229°W • 3893322 • STM
- Estero San Francisco • 38.49073°S 73.31245°W • 3872214 • STM
- Río Quillén • 38.4938°S 71.22712°W • 3874128 • STM
- Estero Temuco • 38.49664°S 72.57354°W • 3870009 • STM
- Estero Agua Santa • 38.49674°S 72.26296°W • 3900442 • STM
- Río Blanco • 38.49941°S 71.84519°W • 3898209 • STM
- Estero Huimpil • 38.50168°S 72.69838°W • 3887511 • STM
- Estero Antaro • 38.50394°S 72.10106°W • 3899554 • STM
- Estero El Violén • 38.50459°S 72.10005°W • 3890175 • STM
- Río Mitranquén • 38.50624°S 71.20251°W • 3879670 • STM • (Rio Mitranque, Rio Mitranquen, Rio del Ancho, Río Mitranque, Río Mitranquén, Río del Ancho)
- Estero Nilpe • 38.51187°S 72.80653°W • 3878639 • STM • (Arroyo Nilpe, Estero Nilpe)
- Río Muco • 38.51667°S 71.96667°W • 3879233 • STM
- Estero Cohueco • 38.51667°S 72.56667°W • 3894432 • STM
- Estero Chequellame • 38.51667°S 71.83333°W • 3895246 • STM
- Estero Bolleco • 38.51667°S 72.53333°W • 3898118 • STM
- Estero Coihueco • 38.52037°S 72.55744°W • 3894394 • STM • (Estero Cohueco, Estero Coihueco)
- Estero Molpichagua • 38.52318°S 72.55295°W • 3879545 • STM
- Estero Butaco • 38.52355°S 72.55334°W • 3897671 • STM
- Río Pedregoso • 38.52906°S 71.19356°W • 3876901 • STM
- Estero Curaco • 38.52948°S 72.77704°W • 3892925 • STM
- Estero Llinco • 38.53314°S 72.89424°W • 3882881 • STM • (Estero Collinco, Estero Llinco)
- Río Paule • 38.53604°S 71.25328°W • 3876962 • STM
- Río Pacunto • 38.53613°S 71.25284°W • 3877801 • STM • (Estero Pancunto, Rio Pacunto, Rio Pacunto Pedregoso, Río Pacunto, Río Pacunto Pedregoso)
- Río Punta Negra • 38.53807°S 71.42084°W • 3874725 • STM
- Estero Llallicura • 38.5°S 72.1°W • 3883024 • STM
- Río Negro • 38.54219°S 71.8268°W • 3878782 • STM
- Estero Fiero • 38.54393°S 71.78507°W • 3889523 • STM • (Estero Fiero, Estero Fierro)
- Estero Coihueco • 38.54629°S 72.20491°W • 3894393 • STM • (Estero Callimuco, Estero Coihueco, Estero Collimuco)
- Estero Los Ramos • 38.54777°S 73.31765°W • 3881434 • STM
- Estero Queule • 38.55231°S 71.81729°W • 3874317 • STM
- Estero Ñirca • 38.55°S 72.43333°W • 3878605 • STM • (Estero Nereco, Estero Nirca, Estero Ñereco, Estero Ñirca) • (CL)
- Estero Aychuco • 38.55°S 72.96667°W • 3899076 • STM
- Río Pitraco • 38.55485°S 72.87836°W • 3875754 • STM
- Río Pino Solo • 38.55637°S 71.00288°W • 3875901 • STM
- Estero Longlong • 38.55877°S 72.22768°W • 3882553 • STM
- Río Gualyepulli • 38.56198°S 71.18014°W • 3888519 • STM • (Rio Gualyepulli, Rio Guaye, Rio Huelvepulli, Río Gualyepulli, Río Guaye, Río Huelvepulli)
- Estero Malalche • 38.56451°S 72.93544°W • 3880879 • STM
- Río Collins • 38.56478°S 72.26565°W • 3894180 • STM • (Rio Callin, Rio Collin, Rio Collins, Río Callin, Río Collin, Río Collins)
- Estero Rumalhue • 38.56494°S 73.12426°W • 3872701 • STM
- Estero Las Minas • 38.56602°S 72.07077°W • 3884162 • STM
- Estero Rapa • 38.56667°S 72.76667°W • 3873726 • STM
- Río Colorado • 38.56667°S 71.7885°W • 3894028 • STM
- Estero Peupeu • 38.56866°S 72.43583°W • 3876362 • STM
- Estero Nalcadero • 38.56996°S 71.82044°W • 3879078 • STM
- Río Pichi Pehuenco • 38.5702°S 71.17684°W • 3876230 • STM
- Estero Puentes • 38.57698°S 71.77965°W • 3875015 • STM
- Estero Ránquil • 38.57954°S 72.76157°W • 3873739 • STM • (Arroyo Danguil, Estero Danguil, Estero Ranquil, Estero Ránquil)
- Estero Collimallín • 38.58031°S 72.76115°W • 3894186 • STM
- Estero Coihueco • 38.58045°S 72.38062°W • 3894392 • STM
- Estero Deille • 38.58509°S 72.72291°W • 3892691 • STM
- Estero Alhueco • 38.58512°S 72.36451°W • 3900109 • STM
- Estero Pichi Tralihué • 38.58681°S 71.00174°W • 3876220 • STM
- Estero del Trueno • 38.58688°S 72.10294°W • 3869017 • STM • (Estero El Trueno, Estero del Trueno)
- Estero Collihueco • 38.58902°S 72.15593°W • 3894190 • STM • (Estero Colihueco, Estero Collihueco)
- Estero Rumulhue • 38.59715°S 72.87394°W • 3872693 • STM
- Estero Porfiado • 38.59904°S 71.45544°W • 3875438 • STM
- Estero Pichi-Cautín • 38.60006°S 72.76122°W • 3876300 • STM
- Estero El Tambor • 38.60159°S 72.1314°W • 3890321 • STM
- Estero Centinela • 38.60879°S 73.28505°W • 3895966 • STM
- Río Renaco • 38.61186°S 72.84006°W • 3873460 • STM
- Río Dollinco • 38.61648°S 72.41524°W • 3892326 • STM • (Estero Dollinco, Rio Dollinco, Río Dollinco)
- Río Muco • 38.618°S 72.42322°W • 3879232 • STM
- Estero Quilacura • 38.62445°S 72.35494°W • 3874264 • STM
- Río Tralihué • 38.62575°S 71.03454°W • 3869352 • STM
- Río Pino Solo • 38.62625°S 71.03429°W • 3875900 • STM
- Estero Curaco • 38.62797°S 72.8337°W • 3892924 • STM
- Estero Tinvuel • 38.62911°S 72.66962°W • 3869785 • STM
- Estero Buchoco • 38.63002°S 72.6694°W • 3897852 • STM
- Estero Huelqueco • 38.63123°S 72.36923°W • 3887697 • STM • (Estero Huelqueco, Huelquenco)
- Estero Chanco • 38.63333°S 73.33333°W • 3895485 • STM
- Estero Quiripio • 38.63411°S 73.28276°W • 3873955 • STM
- Estero Chapuel • 38.63431°S 72.30249°W • 3895408 • STM • (Estero Chagual, Estero Chapuel)
- Río Pehuenco • 38.63633°S 71.12339°W • 3876873 • STM • (Rio Pehueco, Rio Pehuenco, Río Pehueco, Río Pehuenco)
- Estero Bolleco • 38.63798°S 72.6792°W • 3898117 • STM • (Estero Bolleco, Estero Boyeco)
- Estero Cochicahuin • 38.64449°S 73.33157°W • 3894495 • STM • (Estero Cachicahuin, Estero Cochicahuin)
- Río Liucura • 38.64483°S 71.10837°W • 3883061 • STM
- Estero El Peral • 38.64549°S 73.33882°W • 3890732 • STM
- Estero Intermitente • 38.65246°S 71.83297°W • 3887157 • STM
- Estero Pispico • 38.65284°S 72.83807°W • 3875779 • STM
- Estero Rucañanco • 38.65306°S 71.18584°W • 3872740 • STM
- Estero Burime • 38.65°S 73.18333°W • 3897705 • STM
- Estero Santa Celia • 38.65441°S 73.18246°W • 3871633 • STM
- Estero Hunaco • 38.65606°S 72.1618°W • 3887442 • STM • (Estero Humaco, Estero Hunaco)
- Estero Quintrilpe • 38.65776°S 72.43044°W • 3873973 • STM
- Estero El Saltillo • 38.66409°S 71.01173°W • 3890451 • STM
- Estero Agua Enterrada • 38.66432°S 71.01493°W • 3900490 • STM • (Estero Agua Enterrada, Estero Agua Enterradas)
- Estero de Pino Hachado • 38.6653°S 71.03621°W • 3875907 • STM
- Estero Cunco • 38.66667°S 72.51667°W • 3892979 • STM
- Río Quinquén • 38.6672°S 71.3875°W • 3874010 • STM
- Estero Curileufu • 38.66772°S 72.43752°W • 3892859 • STM • (Estero Curileo, Estero Curileu, Estero Curileufu)
- Río Sanueco • 38.66782°S 71.38725°W • 3871297 • STM
- Estero Trabunco • 38.66829°S 72.65909°W • 3869398 • STM
- Río Vilcún • 38.67238°S 72.27212°W • 3868205 • STM
- Estero Lanlan • 38.67246°S 71.93225°W • 3885216 • STM
- Estero Curaco • 38.67314°S 73.00789°W • 3892923 • STM
- Estero Chanco • 38.67531°S 73.16509°W • 3895484 • STM
- Estero Paulul • 38.67732°S 71.96882°W • 3876956 • STM
- Estero Llamuco • 38.67935°S 72.48532°W • 3883003 • STM
- Estero Hunaco • 38.68074°S 72.22904°W • 3887441 • STM
- Estero Codihue • 38.68217°S 73.00745°W • 3894458 • STM
- Estero Curaco • 38.68314°S 72.78787°W • 3892922 • STM
- Estero Pillo-Mallín • 38.68333°S 72.51667°W • 3875979 • STM
- Estero Millinco • 38.68333°S 73.15°W • 3879865 • STM
- Estero Pumalal • 38.68462°S 72.51246°W • 3874847 • STM
- Estero Pusulhuin • 38.68503°S 72.4921°W • 3874572 • STM
- Río Trufquennilahue • 38.69196°S 71.33056°W • 3869016 • STM
- Río Calbuco • 38.69316°S 72.02047°W • 3897330 • STM
- Estero Coilaco • 38.69752°S 73.00503°W • 3894380 • STM
- Estero Coilico • 38.69872°S 73.13361°W • 3894377 • STM • (Estero Coilico, Rio Collinco, Río Collinco)
- Estero Quelihue • 38.7049°S 72.7803°W • 3874426 • STM • (Estero Molluco, Estero Quelihue)
- Estero Butaco • 38.70501°S 73.20173°W • 3897670 • STM
- Estero Tromen • 38.70569°S 72.7968°W • 3869055 • STM
- Río Las Damas • 38.70711°S 73.17061°W • 3884393 • STM • (Rio Damas, Rio Las Damas, Río Damas, Río Las Damas)
- Estero Pichilleuque • 38.70842°S 72.08871°W • 3876249 • STM
- Estero Champulle • 38.7086°S 73.08091°W • 3895581 • STM
- Estero Pitraco • 38.71008°S 72.80215°W • 3875755 • STM
- Río Tuetué • 38.71282°S 71.11326°W • 3868967 • STM
- Estero Neculqueo • 38.71667°S 72.65°W • 3878963 • STM
- Estero Cailaco • 38.71667°S 72.61667°W • 3897420 • STM
- Estero Lolcura • 38.71757°S 73.14318°W • 3882668 • STM
- Pichi Temuco • 38.71861°S 72.60541°W • 3876221 • STM • (Estero Curaco, Pichi Temuco)
- Estero Colico • 38.71905°S 72.60563°W • 3894274 • STM
- Río Chanchuco • 38.72256°S 71.1307°W • 3895496 • STM
- Río Rucañuco • 38.72394°S 71.18344°W • 3872738 • STM
- Estero Oñoico • 38.72418°S 73.28318°W • 3878061 • STM • (Estero Ono, Estero Onoico, Estero Oño, Estero Oñoico)
- Estero Coihueco • 38.72666°S 72.63375°W • 3894391 • STM
- Estero Temuco • 38.72699°S 72.63442°W • 3870008 • STM
- Estero Curaco • 38.72807°S 73.13477°W • 3892921 • STM
- Estero Oñoico • 38.73143°S 73.12389°W • 3878062 • STM • (Estero Onoico, Estero Onolco, Estero Oñoico, Estero Oñolco)
- Estero Truftruf • 38.73333°S 72.56667°W • 3869015 • STM
- Estero Trentren • 38.73333°S 73.13333°W • 3869239 • STM
- Estero Traitraico • 38.73333°S 72.96667°W • 3869358 • STM
- Estero Llancahue • 38.73333°S 73.06667°W • 3882993 • STM
- Estero Curichapa • 38.73333°S 72.51667°W • 3892873 • STM
- Río Collinco • 38.73333°S 72.35°W • 3894183 • STM • (Estero Collinco, Rio Collinco, Río Collinco) • (CL)
- Río Sollinco • 38.73443°S 72.33619°W • 3870691 • STM
- Estero Quillen • 38.73797°S 73.13277°W • 3874132 • STM
- Estero Yadquihue • 38.7°S 72.8°W • 3867778 • STM
- Estero Molluco • 38.7°S 72.8°W • 3879549 • STM
- Río Agua Enterrada • 38.73962°S 71.90011°W • 3900489 • STM
- Estero Pichico • 38.73984°S 72.96456°W • 3876293 • STM
- Estero Mañío • 38.74162°S 73.08072°W • 3880701 • STM • (Estero Manio, Estero Mañío, Rio Manio, Río Mañio)
- Estero Batuco • 38.74229°S 72.50132°W • 3898589 • STM
- Estero Tranoi • 38.7427°S 72.67282°W • 3869323 • STM
- Estero Lleupeco • 38.74327°S 72.56246°W • 3882907 • STM
- Estero Los Lleuques • 38.74426°S 71.89469°W • 3881912 • STM
- Río Codihue • 38.74844°S 72.3835°W • 3894457 • STM • (Rio Codihue, Rio Codinhue, Río Codihue, Río Codinhue)
- Río Moncul • 38.74914°S 73.42708°W • 3879526 • STM
- Estero Botrolhue • 38.75676°S 72.72521°W • 3897993 • STM • (Estero Bolsolhue, Estero Botrolhue)
- Estero Poguilcha • 38.75752°S 73.21617°W • 3875551 • STM
- Río Queteleufu • 38.76357°S 71.59427°W • 3874338 • STM
- Estero Hurcaco • 38.76449°S 73.0657°W • 3887432 • STM • (Estero Huircaco, Estero Hurcaco)
- Río Rilpe • 38.76667°S 71.63333°W • 3873300 • STM
- Estero Ralipitra • 38.76667°S 72.95°W • 3873834 • STM
- Estero Huilchico • 38.76667°S 72.6°W • 3887556 • STM
- Río Matus • 38.77138°S 72.12274°W • 3880323 • STM
- Río Quetraleufu • 38.77356°S 71.62693°W • 3874332 • STM
- Estero Camare • 38.77395°S 73.16083°W • 3897187 • STM • (Estero Camare, Estero Camore)
- Río Coyán • 38.77417°S 71.55464°W • 3893330 • STM • (Estero C. de Indio, Rio Coyan, Río Coyán)
- Río Loncovaca • 38.774°S 71.55515°W • 3882570 • STM • (Rio Loncovaca, Rio Loncoyan, Río Loncovaca, Río Loncoyán)
- Estero Entuco • 38.77763°S 72.5872°W • 3890029 • STM
- Estero Andimuen • 38.77892°S 73.29639°W • 3899667 • STM
- Estero Perquite • 38.78054°S 73.15227°W • 3876471 • STM
- Estero Lídico • 38.78061°S 73.07495°W • 3883253 • STM • (Estero Lidico, Estero Lídico, Quebrada Lidico)
- Estero Cancura • 38.78126°S 72.94646°W • 3896973 • STM
- Estero Patacón • 38.78333°S 73.08333°W • 3877037 • STM
- Río Imperial • 38.78658°S 73.40801°W • 3887315 • STM • (Rio Imperial, Río Imperial)

- Río Cholchol • 38.75192°S 72.97902°W • 3894893 • STM

- Estero Lumaco • 39.01732°S 72.45625°W • 3881178 • STM • (Estero Lumaco, Rio Lumaco, Río Lumaco)

- Río Purén • 38.07915°S 72.87385°W • 3874609 • STM
- Río Colpi • 38.3548°S 72.89778°W • 3894006 • STM • (Rio Colpi, Rio Panqueco, Rio Panquenco, Río Colpi, Río Panqueco, Río Panquenco)

- Río Traiguén • 39.05951°S 73.06623°W • 3869369 • STM
- Río Quino • 38.32528°S 72.71418°W • 3874015 • STM

- Río Quillén • 38.43422°S 72.90658°W • 3874129 • STM

- Río Cautín • 38.7531°S 72.98°W • 3896094 • STM • (Cauten, Rio Cautin, Río Cautín)

- Río Quepe • 38.78119°S 72.92648°W • 3874364 • STM

- Río Huichahue • 38.86375°S 72.58612°W • 3887567 • STM

- Muco River

- Río Callín • 37.8211°S 72.45083°W • 3897230 • STM • (Rio Callin, Rio Collin, Río Callín, Río Collin)

- Río Blanco (Caburga) • 38.44043°S 71.99037°W • 3898210 • STM

- Estero Curilebu • 38.79083°S 73.24607°W • 3892861 • STM
- Estero Laja • 38.8056°S 72.95155°W • 3885569 • STM
- Estero Boroa • 38.8082°S 72.87334°W • 3898024 • STM
- Estero Llicoca • 38.81197°S 73.3255°W • 3882892 • STM
- Estero Cudico • 38.81238°S 73.05694°W • 3893159 • STM • (Estero Codico, Estero Cudico)
- Estero Pulol • 38.81533°S 73.28043°W • 3874863 • STM
- Estero Rapa • 38.81667°S 72.7°W • 3873725 • STM
- Estero Llancao • 38.81667°S 72.95°W • 3882989 • STM
- Estero Huillinco • 38.81667°S 73.06667°W • 3887534 • STM
- Estero Chapille • 38.8174°S 73.26366°W • 3895428 • STM
- Estero Collahue • 38.8198°S 72.61997°W • 3894217 • STM
- Estero Puello • 38.8203°S 72.45108°W • 3875034 • STM
- Estero Paifú • 38.82047°S 73.13386°W • 3877771 • STM
- Estero Molco • 38.82154°S 73.07115°W • 3879630 • STM
- Estero Bollilco • 38.82459°S 72.95276°W • 3898113 • STM
- Estero Metrenco • 38.82543°S 72.61542°W • 3879959 • STM
- Río Budi • 38.82556°S 73.39577°W • 3897841 • STM
- Estero Finfín • 38.82745°S 72.81564°W • 3889494 • STM
- Estero Budi Chico • 38.83214°S 73.34601°W • 3897840 • STM
- Estero Traiguén • 38.83333°S 73.03333°W • 3869375 • STM
- Estero Cunco • 38.83333°S 72.6°W • 3892978 • STM
- Río Cantuco • 38.83333°S 71.61667°W • 3896865 • STM
- Estero Chapod • 38.83536°S 72.75128°W • 3895410 • STM
- Estero Llamaico • 38.8°S 72.58333°W • 3883021 • STM
- Estero Huilquilco • 38.84076°S 72.70275°W • 3887513 • STM
- Estero Pelal • 38.84202°S 72.70592°W • 3876806 • STM • (Estero El Peral, Estero Pelal)
- Estero Chucauco • 38.8422°S 72.7715°W • 3894790 • STM
- Estero Huichahue • 38.84618°S 72.95856°W • 3887568 • STM • (Estero Huichahue, Quebrada El Tonco)
- Estero Curacalpu • 38.84778°S 71.4815°W • 3892937 • STM
- Estero Yuco • 38.84812°S 73.02443°W • 3867632 • STM
- Estero Los Canelos • 38.84876°S 71.79462°W • 3882282 • STM • (Estero Canelos, Estero El Canelo, Estero Los Canelos)
- Río Zahuelhue • 38.84927°S 71.65669°W • 3867586 • STM
- Estero Chufquenpalemo • 38.8495°S 71.57436°W • 3894762 • STM
- Río Alpehue • 38.84977°S 71.65662°W • 3900014 • STM • (Rio Alpahue, Rio Alpehue, Río Alpahue, Río Alpehue)
- Estero Coltúe • 38.85075°S 72.34352°W • 3893994 • STM
- Río Tacura • 38.853°S 71.5583°W • 3870348 • STM
- Estero Membrillo • 38.85344°S 71.70711°W • 3880069 • STM
- Estero Malalcha • 38.85°S 73.03333°W • 3880880 • STM
- Estero Lliuco • 38.85°S 73.2°W • 3882875 • STM
- Estero El Salto • 38.85°S 71.86667°W • 3890432 • STM
- Estero Canelos • 38.85°S 71.8°W • 3896930 • STM
- Río Peuco • 38.8579°S 71.80807°W • 3876389 • STM
- Río Guallerupe • 38.85921°S 71.68376°W • 3888532 • STM • (Rio Alpehue, Rio Guallerupe, Río Alpehue, Río Guallerupe)
- Estero El Manzano • 38.86313°S 71.82889°W • 3891075 • STM • (Estero El Manzano, Estero El Manzanol, Rio del Manzano, Río del Manzano)
- Río Malalcahuello • 38.86369°S 71.54989°W • 3880881 • STM
- Río Curilafquén • 38.86402°S 71.55029°W • 3892864 • STM
- Estero Collileufu • 38.86458°S 73.33977°W • 3894188 • STM
- Estero Pillanco • 38.86606°S 72.64878°W • 3875988 • STM
- Estero Llallehue • 38.86612°S 73.2093°W • 3883026 • STM • (Estero Llahuelle, Estero Llallehue)
- Estero Quilinco • 38.86667°S 73.03333°W • 3874200 • STM
- Estero Quenuco • 38.86667°S 71.81667°W • 3874372 • STM
- Estero Folilco • 38.86667°S 71.78333°W • 3889415 • STM
- Río Caihuico • 38.86667°S 72.6°W • 3897422 • STM
- Estero Cumbli • 38.87873°S 72.50076°W • 3893010 • STM
- Río Tumuntuco • 38.87953°S 72.5006°W • 3868932 • STM
- Río Carén • 38.88029°S 71.53716°W • 3896670 • STM
- Estero Chucaco • 38.88294°S 72.45113°W • 3894793 • STM
- Río Llaima • 38.88296°S 71.85071°W • 3883031 • STM
- Estero Tabal • 38.88333°S 72.61667°W • 3870396 • STM
- Estero Matrilhue • 38.88333°S 73.18333°W • 3880326 • STM
- Estero Comoe • 38.88333°S 73.25°W • 3893950 • STM
- Estero Huechulepán • 38.89399°S 71.48°W • 3887739 • STM
- Estero Bollico • 38.89743°S 73.25582°W • 3898114 • STM • (Estero Bollico, Estero Bollilco)
- Estero Coihue • 38.90265°S 72.93444°W • 3894419 • STM • (Estero Coihue, Quebrada Coihue)
- Estero Picuche • 38.91136°S 72.82632°W • 3876186 • STM
- Río Malulco • 38.91783°S 71.72424°W • 3880793 • STM
- Estero Cunco • 38.93314°S 72.03889°W • 3892977 • STM
- Río Curacalpu • 38.93461°S 71.91835°W • 3892936 • STM
- Estero Tapelco • 38.93774°S 72.07218°W • 3870146 • STM
- Estero Nahuelcura • 38.9382°S 72.07251°W • 3879090 • STM • (Estero Nahuelcura, Rio Nahulcura, Rio Nahulcuro, Río Nahulcura)
- Estero Allipén • 38.93859°S 73.25718°W • 3900066 • STM
- Estero Alinilahue • 38.9°S 72.61667°W • 3900087 • STM
- Río Negro • 38.94265°S 71.94323°W • 3878781 • STM
- Estero Budi • 38.94718°S 73.28423°W • 3897843 • STM
- Estero Malalhue • 38.94973°S 73.31321°W • 3880872 • STM
- Estero Tugo • 38.95°S 72.85°W • 3868965 • STM
- Estero Pipilos • 38.95°S 72.81667°W • 3875852 • STM
- Estero Ineique • 38.95°S 72.85°W • 3887237 • STM
- Estero Rehuelhue • 38.95613°S 72.95796°W • 3873538 • STM
- Estero Epuralal • 38.96037°S 72.13757°W • 3890018 • STM
- Estero Quechereguas • 38.96074°S 72.1378°W • 3874466 • STM • (Estero Loncoche, Estero Quechereguas)
- Estero Huilio • 38.96238°S 73.01276°W • 3887547 • STM
- Estero Lluco • 38.96667°S 73.11667°W • 3882836 • STM
- Estero Dollinco • 38.96972°S 73.0383°W • 3892330 • STM
- Estero Curipel • 38.97808°S 73.10679°W • 3892843 • STM
- Estero El Único • 38.98173°S 72.61122°W • 3890199 • STM
- Estero Hullinco • 38.98333°S 73.11667°W • 3887462 • STM
- Estero Barranco • 38.9837°S 72.61223°W • 3898722 • STM
- Estero Barrozo • 38.9862°S 72.58272°W • 3898636 • STM
- Estero Dichas • 38.99088°S 72.8834°W • 3892471 • STM • (Estero Dichas, Estero Ineihoc)
- Estero Lolén • 38.99172°S 72.76338°W • 3882665 • STM
- Estero Trumpulo • 38.99899°S 72.22279°W • 3869006 • STM
- Estero Neicuf • 39.00108°S 73.11248°W • 3878752 • STM
- Estero Choroico • 39.00434°S 72.346°W • 3894857 • STM
- Río Longlong • 39.00462°S 72.44485°W • 3882552 • STM • (Rio Longlona, Rio Longlong, Río Longlona, Río Longlong)
- Estero Llollelhue • 39.01177°S 72.93973°W • 3882856 • STM
- Estero Filcun • 39.01459°S 71.45609°W • 3889509 • STM • (Estero Eilcun, Estero Filcun)
- Estero Allinco • 39.02282°S 72.52702°W • 3900071 • STM
- Estero Huepollén • 39.02344°S 71.46658°W • 3887634 • STM • (Estero Huepollen, Estero Huepollén, Estero Huepoltue)
- Estero Chanco • 39.02376°S 72.77487°W • 3895483 • STM
- Río Quinque • 39.02548°S 72.98878°W • 3874013 • STM
- Estero Pucolón • 39.02701°S 73.11633°W • 3875072 • STM
- Estero Chelle • 39.02709°S 73.30503°W • 3895278 • STM • (Estero Chelle, Rio Chelle, Río Chelle)
- Río Tráilanqui • 39.0376°S 72.28058°W • 3869365 • STM
- Estero Chada • 39.04431°S 72.71567°W • 3895697 • STM
- Estero Curaco • 39.04698°S 72.11516°W • 3892920 • STM
- Río Colico • 39.04722°S 72.11463°W • 3894272 • STM
- Estero Malalhue • 39.05488°S 71.73239°W • 3880871 • STM
- Estero Cunco • 39.0553°S 71.73162°W • 3892976 • STM
- Río Coipué • 39.0644°S 73.12918°W • 3894350 • STM
- Estero Viloco • 39.06667°S 72.85°W • 3868138 • STM
- Estero Comul • 39.06985°S 72.84346°W • 3893940 • STM
- Estero Chailef • 39.0765°S 72.59405°W • 3895648 • STM • (Estero Chailef, Estero Chuilef)
- Estero Dollerepu • 39.08475°S 71.47469°W • 3892335 • STM • (Estero Dellerrepu, Estero Dollerepu)
- Estero Liñeco • 39.08922°S 71.78467°W • 3883140 • STM
- Estero Troquen • 39.09119°S 72.41635°W • 3869031 • STM
- Estero Sallipulli • 39.09168°S 71.47567°W • 3872522 • STM
- Río Rucacura • 39.09201°S 73.2802°W • 3872745 • STM
- Estero Pichico • 39.10014°S 71.74092°W • 3876292 • STM
- Estero Curinumo • 39.1072°S 71.47031°W • 3892847 • STM
- Estero Coihueco • 39.10868°S 71.79242°W • 3894390 • STM
- Estero Guisno • 39.11214°S 72.62946°W • 3888254 • STM
- Estero Barranco • 39.12688°S 72.43119°W • 3898721 • STM
- Río Yenellenchico • 39.13333°S 73.26667°W • 3867685 • STM
- Estero Quitrahue • 39.13388°S 72.66949°W • 3873906 • STM • (Estero Puyehue, Estero Quitrahue)
- Río Llihuin • 39.13487°S 72.62875°W • 3882886 • STM • (Rio Llihuin, Rio Llinhuin, Río Llihuin, Río Llinhuin)
- Estero Ulmos • 39.13688°S 72.34168°W • 3868832 • STM
- Estero Lindero • 39.13918°S 72.4423°W • 3883153 • STM
- Estero Petrenco • 39.13972°S 72.44453°W • 3876412 • STM
- Estero Quema • 39.14658°S 72.46756°W • 3874410 • STM
- Río Lloco • 39.15028°S 72.59351°W • 3882865 • STM
- Estero Pulul • 39.15082°S 72.59273°W • 3874854 • STM
- Estero Checat • 39.15179°S 71.49142°W • 3895312 • STM • (Estero Checat, Estero Checot)
- Estero Totoral • 39.15883°S 72.11036°W • 3869436 • STM
- Estero Pidenco • 39.16063°S 72.85066°W • 3876171 • STM
- Estero Sepulco • 39.16314°S 72.55105°W • 3871010 • STM
- Río Pedregoso • 39.16438°S 72.332°W • 3876900 • STM
- Estero Lumaco • 39.18259°S 71.81188°W • 3881177 • STM • (Estero Iumaco, Estero Lumaco)
- Río Voipire • 39.20851°S 72.32073°W • 3867980 • STM
- Río Quiñenahuín • 39.20988°S 71.43684°W • 3874023 • STM
- Río Traileufu • 39.21574°S 72.04615°W • 3869363 • STM
- Río Quileno • 39.22414°S 71.74378°W • 3874222 • STM
- Río Quelhue • 39.23688°S 71.96205°W • 3874428 • STM
- Río Pucón • 39.24976°S 71.97075°W • 3875069 • STM • (Rio Minetue, Rio Pucon, Río Minetué, Río Pucón)
- Río Carrileufú • 39.25122°S 71.84047°W • 3896513 • STM
- Estero Mañío • 39.25123°S 72.55221°W • 3880700 • STM
- Río Toltén • 39.25233°S 73.22383°W • 3869671 • STM

- Río Mahuidanche • 39.03402°S 72.97846°W • 3881012 • STM • (Rio Mahuidan, Rio Mahuidanche, Rio Mahuidanchi, Río Mahuidanche, Río Mahuidanchi)
- Río Donguil • 39.02764°S 72.80409°W • 3892274 • STM • (Dongul?)

- Estero Puyehue • 39.23333°S 72.66667°W • 3874534 • STM

- Río Allipén • 39.01437°S 72.51097°W • 3900065 • STM

- Río Curaco • 39.02467°S 72.2473°W • 3892915 • STM
- Río Trufultruful • 38.85121°S 71.67132°W • 3869013 • STM

- Río Trancura • 39.3496°S 71.57925°W • 3869327 • STM

- Río Liucura • 39.27347°S 71.89589°W • 3883060 • STM

- Estero Quinquichán • 39.25°S 72.55°W • 3874009 • STM
- Estero Collaco • 39.25845°S 71.78731°W • 3894225 • STM
- Río Claro • 39.26023°S 71.97377°W • 3894565 • STM
- Estero Lliulliu • 39.26757°S 72.3925°W • 3882870 • STM
- Río Pucayán • 39.28191°S 72.39032°W • 3875094 • STM
- Estero Pilico • 39.28223°S 72.47947°W • 3876001 • STM
- Río Huiscapi • 39.28305°S 72.4796°W • 3887477 • STM • (Rio Huiscape, Rio Huiscapi, Río Huiscape, Río Huiscapi)
- Estero Chircos • 39.29085°S 72.00618°W • 3894972 • STM • (Estero Chircos, Rio Chircos, Río Chircos)
- Río Curimeno • 39.29383°S 71.43422°W • 3892855 • STM
- Río Lahuenco • 39.29439°S 71.43392°W • 3885633 • STM
- Estero Tungui • 39.29501°S 72.45592°W • 3868917 • STM
- Estero Cumin • 39.29546°S 72.09944°W • 3893000 • STM
- Río Cuico • 39.29662°S 72.01516°W • 3893086 • STM
- Estero Pichilefén • 39.29834°S 72.11442°W • 3876258 • STM
- Río Llefuén • 39.30082°S 72.06836°W • 3882919 • STM • (Estero Lefuen, Rio Llefuen, Río Llefuén)
- Río Grande • 39.3024°S 72.07706°W • 3888776 • STM
- Río Turbio • 39.30412°S 71.88466°W • 3868885 • STM
- Estero Llaullau • 39.30469°S 72.25372°W • 3882928 • STM • (Estero Llaullau, Rio Llaullau, Río Llaullau)
- Estero Carrileufú • 39.30546°S 72.25379°W • 3896514 • STM
- Río Llafenco • 39.33173°S 71.78351°W • 3883048 • STM
- Río Cavisañi • 39.33406°S 71.74425°W • 3896078 • STM
- Rí Huirinlil • 39.33435°S 71.50387°W • 3887480 • STM • (Ri Huirinlil, Rio Huirintil, Rí Huirinlil, Río Huirintil)
- Río Maichín • 39.34896°S 71.57851°W • 3881006 • STM
- Río Ilecura • 39.35086°S 71.63492°W • 3887350 • STM
- Estero Niguen • 39.36097°S 72.61606°W • 3878662 • STM
- Estero Luma • 39.36242°S 72.43628°W • 3881183 • STM
- Río Mailenco • 39.36523°S 73.18362°W • 3881000 • STM
- Río Copihuelpi • 39.37002°S 72.39492°W • 3893649 • STM
- Estero Cahuinhue • 39.37307°S 72.61787°W • 3897440 • STM
- Estero Loncovilo • 39.37617°S 71.6991°W • 3882569 • STM
- Estero Antuco • 39°S 72.95°W • 3899523 • STM
- Río Queule • 39.39031°S 73.22422°W • 3874316 • STM
- Estero Pirén • 39.39262°S 73.19385°W • 3875816 • STM
- Estero Coihue • 39.39815°S 72.70847°W • 3894418 • STM
- Estero Mulul • 39.40731°S 72.82202°W • 3879188 • STM
- Río Liumalla • 39.41416°S 72.25607°W • 3883058 • STM • (Rio Liumalla, Rio Lumalla, Río Liumalla, Río Lumalla)
- Estero Runcahue • 39.4213°S 72.78258°W • 3872692 • STM
- Río Leufucade • 39.45321°S 72.7866°W • 3883301 • STM • (Rio Leufucade, Rio de Levufucade, Río Leufucade)
- Río Epucura • 39.49901°S 72.0657°W • 3890021 • STM
- Estero Chalipen • 39.50424°S 72.10948°W • 3895619 • STM
- Río Antilhue • 39.5188°S 72.54798°W • 3899544 • STM • (Rio Antilhu, Rio Antilhue, Río Antilhu, Río Antilhue)
- Río Puesco • 39.53217°S 71.55319°W • 3874923 • STM
- Río Chaingal • 39.5°S 72.55°W • 3895646 • STM
- Estero Dollinco • 39.54934°S 72.80279°W • 3892329 • STM
- Río Momolluco • 39.55264°S 71.56126°W • 3879539 • STM • (Rio Momo Iluco, Rio Momolluco, Río Momo Iluco, Río Momolluco)
- Estero Melisque • 39.55705°S 72.44015°W • 3880102 • STM
- Río Trailefquén • 39.56509°S 72.27682°W • 3869364 • STM
- Río Yihuechozoy • 39.58563°S 71.92834°W • 3867647 • STM
- Río Llancahue • 39.6014°S 71.99415°W • 3882990 • STM
- Estero Nalalhuaca • 39.60968°S 72.44875°W • 3879079 • STM
- Río Taitay • 39.61194°S 72.355°W • 3870314 • STM
- Río Guanehue • 39.62266°S 72.22696°W • 3888439 • STM • (Rio Guanehue, Rio Huanehue, Río Guanehue, Río Huanehue)
- Río Malihue • 39.62597°S 71.92734°W • 3880856 • STM • (Estero Malihue, Rio Malihue, Río Malihue)

== See also ==
- List of lakes in Chile
- List of volcanoes in Chile
- List of islands of Chile
- List of fjords, channels, sounds and straits of Chile
- List of lighthouses in Chile
