= Francisco de Quiñones (soldier) =

Spanish soldier and governor

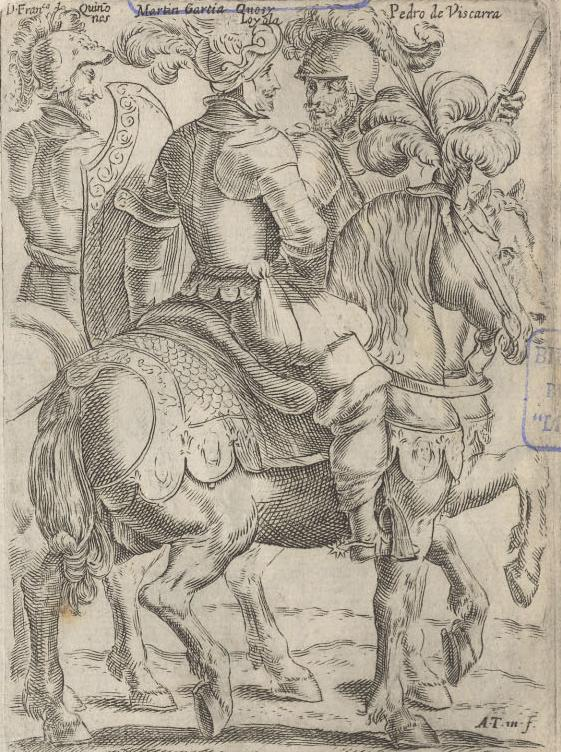
Francisco de Quiñones (left) with Oñez de Loyola and Viscarra.

Francisco de Quiñones (? - ? Leon †); Spanish soldier who was appointed as governor of Chile for thirteen months, between May 1599 and June 1600.

== Biography ==
When he became governor of Chile, Quiñones was a veteran soldier. He had served, in 1559, in the Spanish Tercios that operated in Italy. He embarked in the squadron of the viceroy of Naples, in a campaign against Turkish pirates. In 1560 in the Battle of Djerba that was a disaster for the Spaniards who lost thirty ships. Quiñones became one of the five thousand prisoners who were taken to Istanbul and sold as slaves. Later rescued by means of the payment of a large ransom, he continued as a soldier fighting in Italy and Flanders. On his return to Spain, Quiñones married Grimanesa de Mogrovejo, sister of the inquisidor of Granada, later canonized as Saint Turibius of Mongrovejo. When this monk was promoted to the rank of archbishop of Lima, Quiñones went to Peru, in 1580, as part of his retinue. Thanks to the protection of the archbishop, Quiñones soon became maestre de campo and general commissioner of the cavalry. In 1582, the Viceroy of Peru, Martin Enríquez de Almansa made him commander of the treasure fleet that sailed from Peru to Panama, be sent to Spain from there. Later he was named corregidor of Lima, a position in which he gained some notice as a pursuer of thieves and vagabonds.

Quiñones was designated Royal Governor of Chile by the Viceroy of Peru, Luis de Velasco, after finding out about the death of Martín García Óñez de Loyola at the hands of the forces of the Mapuche toqui Pelantaro, in the Battle of Curalaba. Once in Chile he replaced the lawyer Pedro de Viscarra, who had temporarily administered the government. He commanded the Spaniards during the early desperate months of the Mapuche Revolt of 1598. During 1599, despite his efforts the Mapuche destroyed the forts of Chivicura and Jesus de Huenuraquí in Catirai and its city Santa Cruz de Coya, the cities of Santa María la Blanca de Valdivia, San Andrés de Los Infantes and San Bartolomé de Chillán y Gamboa. In 1600, Quiñones was able to rebuild a fort at the site of the destroyed city of Chillán.

== Sources ==
- Diego Barros Arana Historia general de Chile, Tomo tercero, Capítulo XV Gobierno interino de Pedro de Viscarra (1599). Nuevos desastres; arribo de otro Gobernador

Government offices
Preceded by Pedro de Viscarra	Royal Governor of Chile; 1599–1600	Succeeded by Alonso García de Ramón
