= Curaco =

Curaco or Curacó may refer to:

- Curacó Department, La Pampa Province, Argentina
- Curaco River, Chile
- Curaco Airport, north of Panguipulli, Los Ríos Region, Chile

== See also ==
- Curaco de Vélez, Chile, a commune
- Curaçao (disambiguation)
- Darius Ciraco (born 1996), Canadian football player
