= Chivicura =

Chivicura was a fort erected in 1593 by the Royal Governor of Chile, Martín García Oñez de Loyola on the south bank of the Biobío River, to the west of the confluence of the Rele River with the Bio Bio, in what is now the commune of Santa Juana, Chile. It was in communication with the fort Jesus de Huenuraquí across the river securing the communications of the city of Santa Cruz de Coya in Catirai. Both forts and the city were destroyed by the Moluche in 1599. The name Chivicura means light stone, from chiv or shyv, light and from cura, stone.

== See also ==
- La Frontera (geographical region)
