= Tavolevo River =

River in Chile

Coordinates: 37°28′10.08″S 72°41′12.42″W

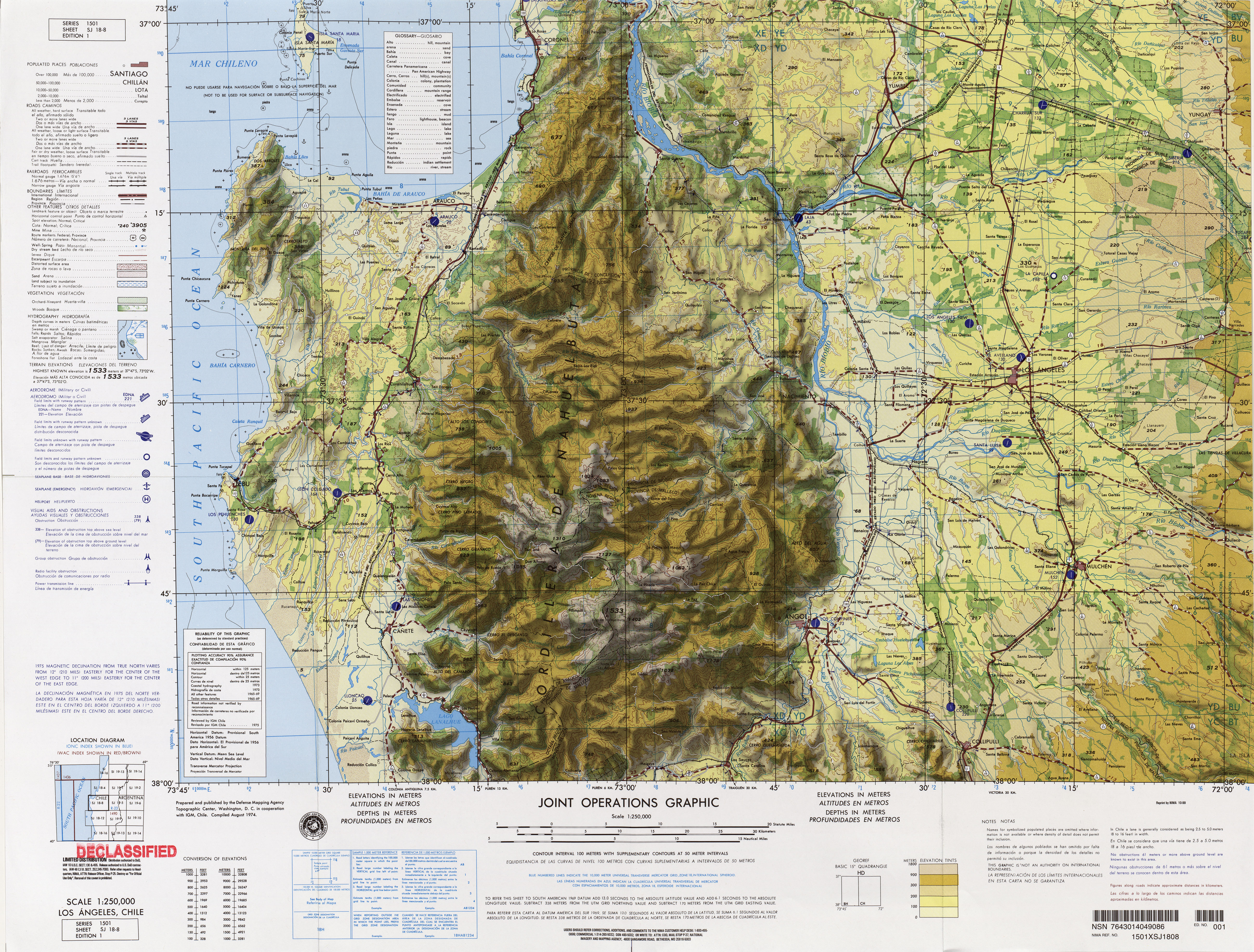

The Tavolevo River is a tributary of the Biobío River in Chile. It has two tributaries, the Culenco River flowing southeast from the Nahuelbuta Range in the Catirai region, and the Nicodahue River that flows north from the La Araucanía Region and its two tributaries the Esperanza and Maitenrehue Rivers that all originate northwest of Angol. It is sometimes considered part of the Nicodahue River. The Tavolevo flows into the Bio Bio fifty kilometers beyond the confluence of the Nicodahue and Culenco Rivers and seven kilometers to the north of Nacimiento. Immediately downstream from its mouth was the location of the old fort of Espirito Santo and on its banks significant placer gold deposits. The river was navigable by flatboats up to nine kilometers above its confluence with the Bio Bio. Its Mapudungun name meant confluence (from thavun, to join itself, and from leuvu, river).

== Sources ==
- Francisco Solano Asta-Buruaga y Cienfuegos, Diccionario geográfico de la República de Chile, D. Appleton y Compania, Nueva York, 1899, Pg. 802 Tavolevo — Rio de
