= Puren =

Puren may refer to:

- Purén, city in Chile
- Puren River
- Jin Youzhi (1918–2015), brother of Puyi, the last Emperor of China
- Puren, verb in Finnish, "I bite"
