= Jesús de Huenuraquí =

Spanish Fort in Chile

Coordinates: 37°12′4.62″S 72°46′12.55″W

Jesús de Huenuraquí was a Spanish fort on heights to the north of the north bank of the Biobío River, next to the site of the modern rail station of Huenuraquí, in the commune of San Rosendo. It is eight kilometers west of San Rosendo and ten kilometers south of the town of Rere, Chile.

Fort de Jesús was erected in 1593 by Governor Martín García Óñez de Loyola jointly with the fort of Chivicura across the Biobío on the south bank. They were erected to secure the communications of the city of Santa Cruz de Coya in Catirai. Both forts and the city were destroyed by the Moluche in 1599. Fort de Jesús was rebuilt by Alonso de Ribera in 1602 as Fuerte de Huenuraquí as part of the fort system of La Frontera. The Mapudungun name comes from huenu, "above", and from raqui, the Moluche sound for the voice of the bird that in Chile is called the bandurria, the black-faced ibis.
