= Muco =

Muco may refer to:

== People ==
- Betim Muço (1947–2015), Albanian writer
- Chelsea Muco (born 1997), Swedish singer
- Fatos Muço (born 1949), Albanian chess player
- Skënder Muço (1904–1944), Albanian resistance leader

== Places ==
- Muco River, Chile

== Other ==
- Lovely Muco, Japanese manga series
- Muco-Inositol, taste modality of the mammalian nervous system
