= Santa Cruz de Óñez =

Fort founded by Martín García Óñez de Loyola

Santa Cruz de Óñez was a fort founded by Martín García Óñez de Loyola in May 1594, near the confluence of the Bio-Bio and Laja Rivers on the right bank of the upper reach of the Rele River in Catiray, ten kilometers south of the Bio-Bio. The site was in an elevated location but with a shortage of water. Gold mines were located across the Rele on a stream called Millapoa.

The fort was elevated to the rank of city in 1595 giving it the name of Santa Cruz de Coya, or Millacoya.

== Sources ==
- Atlas de Historia de Chile, Editorial Universitaria, ISBN 9561117762 pg. 48.
- Francisco Solano Asta-Buruaga y Cienfuegos, Diccionario geográfico de la República de Chile, SEGUNDA EDICIÓN CORREGIDA Y AUMENTADA, NUEVA YORK, D. APPLETON Y COMPAÑÍA. 1899. Pg. 190 Coya
