= Pedro de Viscarra =

Royal Governor of Chile

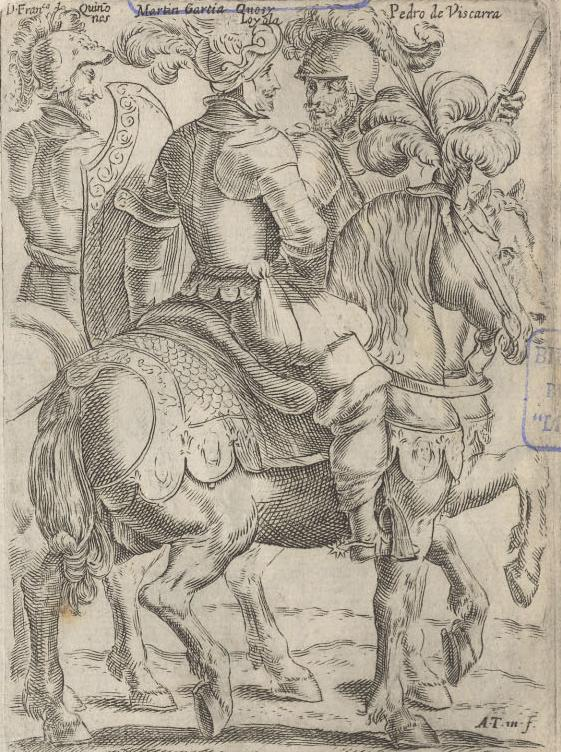
Quiñones, Oñes de Loyola and Pedro de Viscarra.

Pedro de Viscarra (or Vizcarra) de la Barrera (Sevilla, c. 1530 – Chile, c. 1605), was a Spanish lawyer who was twice Royal Governor of Chile.

== Biography ==
He was the son of Diego de Vizcarra and Isabel de la Barrera, residents of Seville. After obtaining his law degree, he traveled to the Indies and settled in Nicaragua (1554), where he married the daughter of a conquistador. His primary occupation was military service. He participated in the campaign against Juan Gaitán in Guatemala and in various other skirmishes in Quito amidst the unrest caused by the rebel Francisco Hernández Girón.
He later returned to Guatemala, where he held several Alcalde Mayor posts and served as a relator for the Audiencia. Subsequently, he traveled to Spain (February 1563), where he was granted the position of "relator" for the Royal Audiencia of Lima (7 August 1566). The following year, he received permission to embark for his new post (29 January 1567).

He remained in Lima for many years, until he was appointed Captain General of the Kingdom of Chile (5 November 1588), arriving there nearly two years later (6 September 1590).
Governor Alonso de Sotomayor went to Peru on 30 July 1592 to petition the viceroy there for more men, leaving Pedro de Viscarra with the title of lieutenant governor of Chile. Upon the arrival of Martín García Óñez de Loyola on 23 September 1592 to replace Sotomayor, Viscarra relinquished his office.
When the Kingdom's governor, Martín García Óñez de Loyola, departed for the frontier, Licentiate Vizcarra was left in charge of administrative affairs. Upon news reaching Santiago of the governor's death in the Battle of Curalaba (23 December 1598), Vizcarra again assumed the interim governorship for six months until he was replaced as governor by Francisco de Quiñones in May 1599.

During his tenure, his main focus was the military defense against the uprising of the indigenous population. He was one of the jurists who advocated for the re-establishment of a Royal Audiencia in the Kingdom of Chile (1603).

Government offices
Preceded by Alonso de Sotomayor	Royal Governor of Chile; 1592	Succeeded by Martín García Óñez de Loyola
Preceded by Martín García Óñez de Loyola	Royal Governor of Chile; 1598–1599	Succeeded by Francisco de Quiñones
