= Nuestra de Señora de Halle =

Nuestra Señora de Halle was a fort in the modern Bío Bío Region of Chile, established in 1603 by Governor Alonso de Ribera. It was situated on the south bank of the Bio Bio River in Catirai, along the upper part of its confluence with the Rele River. It was a little up river from the confluence of the Bio Bio and Laja rivers and the fort of San Rosendo. Ribera named the fort for the city of Halle, in Belgium where he had previously spent many years in the war there.

In 1605, the fort was transformed into the town of Monterrey de la Frontera named for the then viceroy of Peru Gaspar de Zúñiga y Acevedo, Count of Monterrey. It was sometimes called Coya for it was thought to be a refoundation of the ruined city of Santa Cruz de Coya located not far from the new town. Padre Luis de Valdivia lived in the Jesuit mission house in this town from 1612. The town lasted until 1617 when it was destroyed by the Mapuche. A small town of Monterrey now is located nearby the site.

== See also ==
- La Frontera (geographical region) of Chile

== Sources ==
- Francisco Solano Asta-Buruaga y Cienfuegos, Diccionario geográfico de la República de Chile, SEGUNDA EDICIÓN CORREGIDA Y AUMENTADA, NUEVA YORK, D. APPLETON Y COMPAÑÍA. 1899. Pg. 456 Monterrey de la Frontera
