= Martín García Óñez de Loyola =

Royal Governor of Colonial Chile from 1592 to 1598

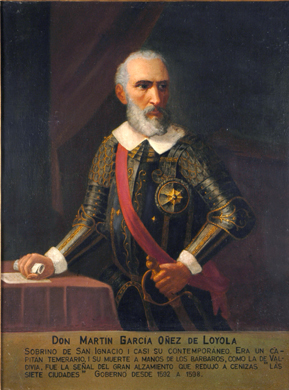

Royal Governor of Chile
- In office 1592–1598
- Monarch: Philip II
- Preceded by: Pedro de Viscarra de la Barrera
- Succeeded by: Pedro de Viscarra de la Barrera

Personal details
- Born: c. 1549 Azpeitia, Euskadi, Spain
- Died: December 24, 1598 (aged 48–49) near Lumaco River, Chile
- Spouse: Beatriz Clara Coya
- Relations: Ignatius of Loyola (grand-uncle)

Military service
- Allegiance: Spain
- Years of service: 1568–1598
- Rank: Captain General
- Battles/wars: Conquest of Peru; Capture of Tupac Amaru; Arauco War; Battle of Curalaba †

Don Martín García Óñez de Loyola (c. 1549 – December 24, 1598) was a Spanish-Basque soldier and Royal Governor of Colonial Chile. He was the grand-nephew of Saint Ignatius of Loyola, the founder of the Jesuits.

Óñez de Loyola first gained renown by capturing Inca leader Túpac Amaru, which put an end to the Neo-Inca State. He later fought in the Arauco War after being appointed the Governor of Chile. He was defeated and killed by Mapuche warriors at the Battle of Curalaba, which paved the way for the Destruction of the Seven Cities.

== Early life ==
As a young man in 1568, he arrived in Peru at the side of the new viceroy Francisco de Toledo, Count of Oropesa, as captain of the guard. In 1572, he headed the military expedition against Túpac Amaru, the last descendant of the Incas resisting foreign domination. Flanked by Indian allies Francisco Chilche and Francisco Cayo Topa, Óñez de Loyola led a successful action of an advance column which fell upon the camp of the Inca and captured him.

For this feat, he gained the rank of corregidor in a number of Peruvian towns, entitling him to their goods and labor. He also married to Beatriz Clara Coya, daughter of Inca ruler Sayri Túpac and niece of Túpac Amaru.

With these recommendations, the king named him governor of the Río de la Plata and Paraguay in 1592. However, just before he assumed the position, Philip II designated him Royal Governor of Chile, as he was considered the officer most apt to finish the Arauco War.

== Governor of Chile ==
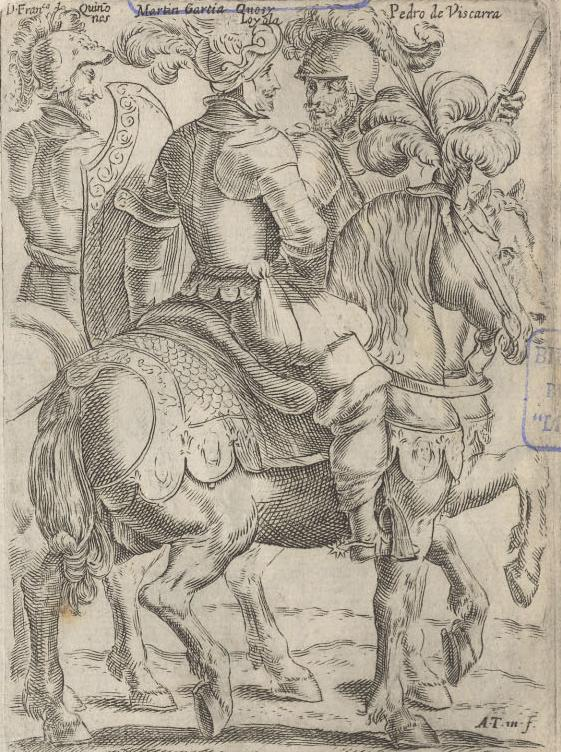
Alonso de Ovalle's 1646 engraving of Quiñónez, Óñez de Loyola and Viscarra

Óñez de Loyola arrived in Chile on September 23, 1592 and was determined to pacify the Arauco. To this end he immediately set out for Concepción at the head of 110 troops which he had gathered at the capital. However, he realized that with such scarce resources he would not be able to achieve his objective and requested reinforcements from Peru. However, the appearance of the British pirate Richard Hawkins alarmed the authorities in Peru and their reinforcements were recalled for the defense of Peru itself. Hawkins also attacked Chile during his campaigns, assaulting Valparaíso for example, where he captured a ship.

The governor did not receive the requested soldiers, but members of the Jesuit and Augustinian orders did arrive. The first would have great importance for later events in the colonization of Chile, until they were eventually expelled.

The governor decided that he could not wait any longer and in 1594 began a campaign to the south with the small contingent that he had assembled. He founded a fort at Santa Cruz de Óñez in May 1594, near the confluence of the Bio-Bio and Laja Rivers in Catiray, where gold mines were located on the Rele River. The fort was elevated to the rank of city in 1595 giving it the name of Santa Cruz de Coya.

Three years later a group of 140 reinforcements arrived, but these were not enough.

== Death ==
The governor was in La Imperial when news arrived that the Mapuches had renewed their attacks against Angol. In order to reinforce the city, he set out with 50 men on December 21, 1598. After two days they arrived at a place called Curallaba or Curalava (the broken rock), on the banks of the Lumaco River, where they rested without taking any precautions against attack. On the nights of the 23rd and 24th the natives approached the camp, and with shouts and the sounds of horns they attacked the Spanish.

Óñez de Loyola and a pair of soldiers at his side fought but finally succumbed to the spears of the natives. In the melee almost all the Spaniards died, save a cleric named Bartolomé Pérez, who was taken prisoner, and a soldier named Bernardo de Pereda, who received 23 wounds on his body and was left for dead but improbably survived.

The Mapuches then initiated a general uprising which destroyed all the cities in their homeland south of the Biobío River. They kept the head of Óñez de Loyola, giving it back years later to the governor Alonso García de Ramón.

== See also ==
- Arauco War
- Mapuche people
- Disaster of Curalaba
- Destruction of Seven Cities

Government offices
Preceded by Pedro de Viscarra	Royal Governor of Chile; 1592–1598	Succeeded by Pedro de Viscarra
