= Quino (disambiguation) =

Quino (1932–2020) was an Argentine cartoonist.

Quino may also refer to:

- Quinó River, a river in Roraima, Brazil
- Quino, Chile, a village in Araucanía Region, Chile
- Quino River, a river in Chile
- 27178 Quino, an inner main-belt asteroid named after the Argentine cartoonist

== People with the given name ==
- Quino Cabrera (born 1971), Spanish footballer
- Quino Colom (born 1988), Spanish-Andorran basketball player
- Quino Hernández (born 1964), Spanish cyclist
- Quino Muñoz (born 1975), Spanish tennis player
- Quino Sierra (born 1945), Spanish footballer

== See also ==
- Quinito (disambiguation) (diminutive form)
