= Santa Cruz de Coya =

Coordinates: 37°17′10″S 72°50′04″W

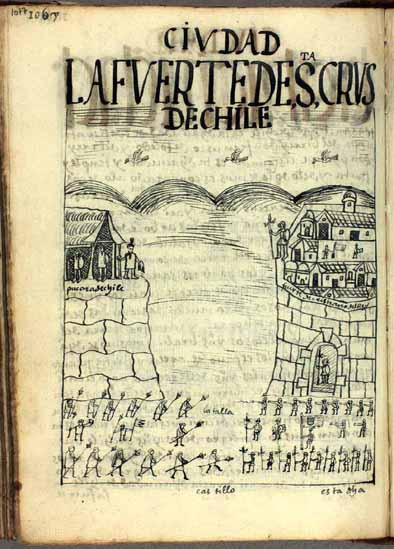
"The native pukara and the Christian fortress of Santa Cruz de Chile, the scene of battles between Spanish Christians and the native infidels of Chile", painting of 1615 by the Inca painter Guamán Poma. Royal Library, Denmark.

Santa Cruz de Coya was a city established by the governor of Chile Martín García Oñez de Loyola on the site of the fort of Santa Cruz de Oñez, in 1595. It was named for his wife Beatriz Clara Coya, a member of the royal Incan house. The Mapuche called the city Millacoya, meaning gold princess from the mapudungun milla, gold and the quechua coya, princess.

The city was near the confluence of the Bio-Bio and Laja Rivers on the right bank of the upper reach of the Rele River in Catiray, ten kilometers south of the Bio Bio. The site was in an elevated location but with a shortage of water. Gold mines were located across the Rele on a stream called Millapoa. It had a population that supported three churches but it did not flourish. It was abandoned soon after the Disaster of Curalaba and was destroyed by Pelantaro in February 1599. Governor Alonso de Ribera attempted to rebuild it in a better site in 1601 closer to the Bio Bio and the forts of San Rosendo, Chivicura and Jesus de Huenuraquí. However it was soon abandoned and a new town of Monterrey de la Frontera was founded by Ribera to the east at the mouth of the Rele in 1605.
