= Culenco River =

River in Chile

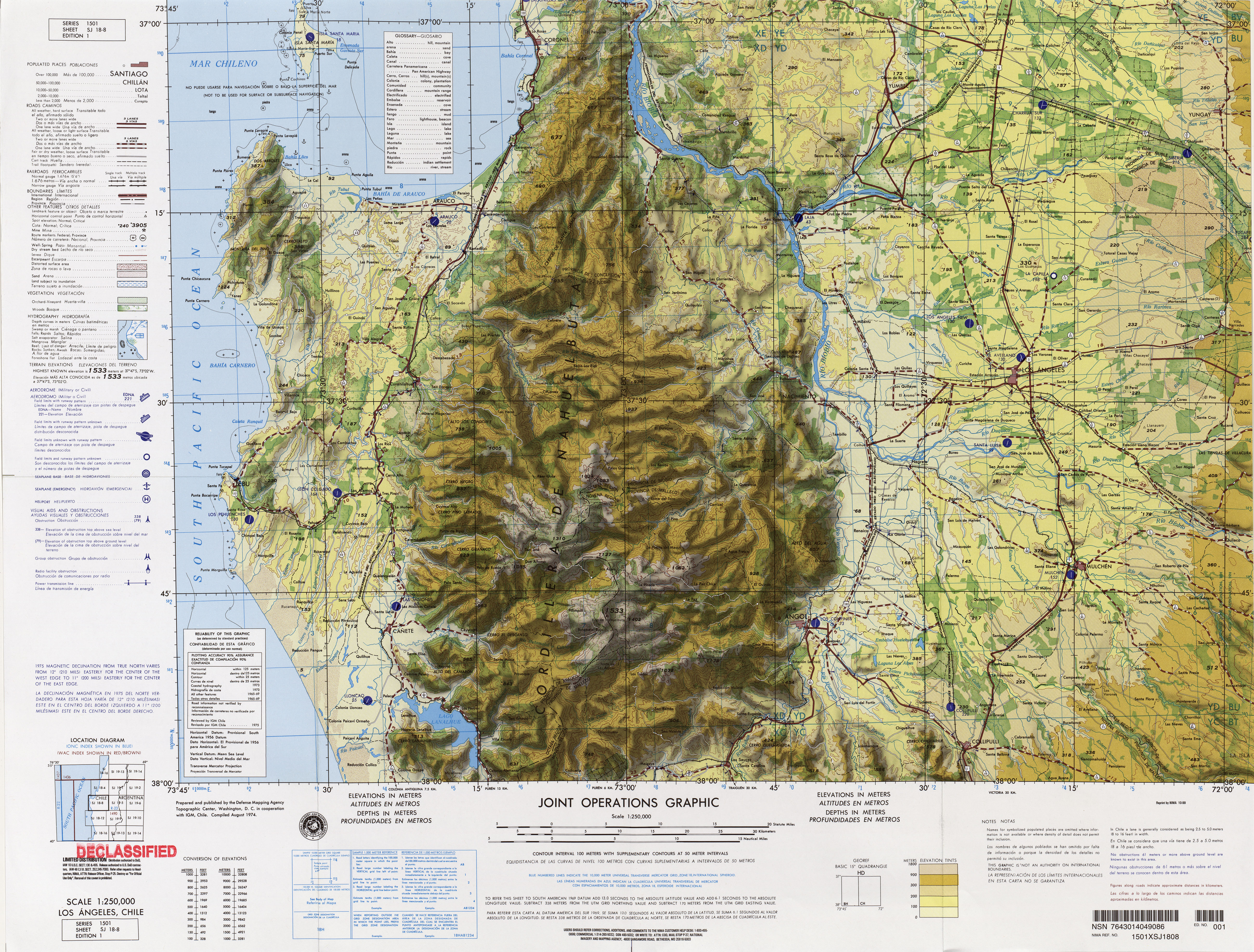
Tavolevo (also Tavoleo), Nicodahue and Culenco Rivers between the Nahuelbuta Range and the Biobío River

Culenco a river of moderate volume that runs from the southern part of the commune of Santa Juana, through the northwestern part of the commune of Nacimiento to its confluence with the Nicodahue River. It has origins in streams from the eastern slopes of the Nahuelbuta Range in the Catirai region to the south of the town of Santa Juana, where it unites several streams from that side of that forested mountain range, and goes towards the southeast to join with the Nicodahue River after a course of more than 35 kilometers, to form the Tavolevo River about seven kilometers from the confluence of the Tavolevo with the Bio Bio River. In its lower part it is more open and fertile. Among the valleys and gorges of its upper part existed some indigenous populations in the early period of the Arauco War, and the fort of San Jerónimo de Millapoa was built there to control them in 1585.

== Sources ==
- Francisco Solano Asta-Buruaga y Cienfuegos, Diccionario geográfico de la República de Chile, D. Appleton y Compania, Nueva York, 1899, Pg. 198 Culenco(Rio de)
