= San Jerónimo de Millapoa =

Fort founded by Alonso de Sotomayor

San Jerónimo de Millapoa was a fort founded by Alonso de Sotomayor in 1585. It dominated the small valleys of the eastern slopes of the Nahuelbuta Range of Catirai, in the upper part of the Culenco River, in the mountainous area 25 kilometers south of the modern commune of Santa Juana. The fort had a small garrison for the defense of that region that left it in the general rising of the Mapuche in 1599. It was repopulated in 1607 under Governor Alonso Garcia Ramon, but it did not last for much longer, always harassed by the Mapuche it was demolished by the Spaniards as part of the peace with Catirai worked out at the May 1612 Parliament of Catirai.

== Sources ==
- Francisco Solano Asta-Buruaga y Cienfuegos, Diccionario geográfico de la República de Chile, SEGUNDA EDICIÓN CORREGIDA Y AUMENTADA, NUEVA YORK, D. APPLETON Y COMPAÑÍA. 1899. Pg. 706 San Jerónimo de Millapoa
