= Quinito (disambiguation) =

Quinito (Joaquim Lucas Duro de Jesus, born 1948), is a Portuguese football manager.

Quinito, as a diminutive form of the names Joaquín or Joachim, may also refer to:

- Joaquín Carlos Díaz ("Quinito Díaz", 1948–2015), Cuban chess International Master
- Joaquin Henson ("Quinito Henson", born 1950), Filipino sports analyst and television commentator
- Joaquín Valverde Sanjuán ("Quinito Valverde", 1875–1918), Spanish composer of zarzuelas

Quinito, as a family name, may refer to:

- Wenceslao Quinito Vinzons (1910–1942), Filipino leader of the armed resistance during World War II

== See also ==
- Quino (disambiguation)
