= Curacoa =

Curacoa may refer to:

== Places ==
- Curacoa Island, Queensland, Australia
- Curacoa volcano, Tonga

== Naval vessels ==
- Four ships of the Royal Navy have been named HMS Curacoa:
  - HMS Curacoa (1809), a 36-gun fifth-rate ship launched in 1809. She was reduced to 24 guns in 1831 and broken up in 1849
  - HMS Curacoa (1854), a wood-screw frigate launched in 1854, she was flagship of the Australia Station during the New Zealand Land Wars and was broken up in 1869
  - HMS Curacoa (1878), a screw corvette launched in 1878 and sold in 1904
  - HMS Curacoa (D41), a C-class light cruiser launched in 1917 and accidentally sunk by RMS Queen Mary in 1942

== Other uses ==
- "Curacoa", archaic form of the word "curaçao", especially in reference to liquor

== See also ==
- Curaçao (disambiguation)
- Curassow
- Kurakawa
