= Polcura River =

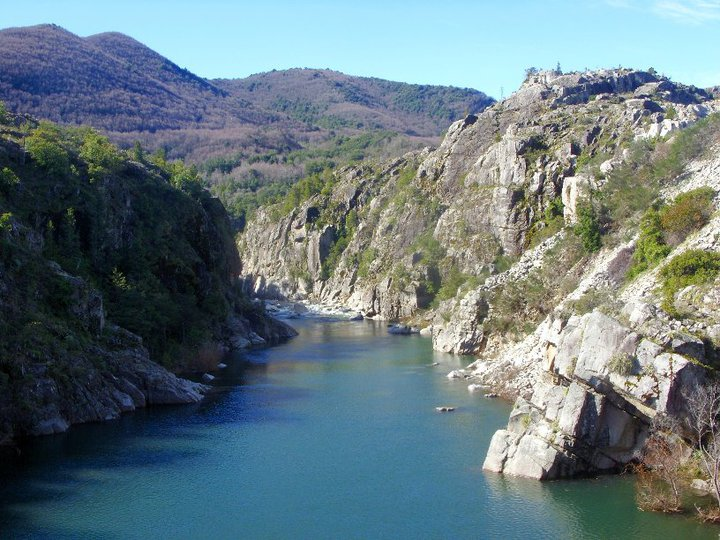
- Path at Antuco beside the Polcura River

Location
- Country: Chile

Physical characteristics
- Mouth: Laja River
  - coordinates: 37°19′49″S 71°32′59″W

The Polcura River is a river in Ñuble Region in the southern portion of Central Chile.

== See also ==
- List of rivers of Chile
