= Huichahue River =

Location
- Country: Chile

Physical characteristics
- Mouth
  - location: Near Quepe, Araucania
  - coordinates: 38°51′46″S 72°35′19″W

The Huichahue River is a river of Chile.

== See also ==
- List of rivers of Chile
