= Battle of Curalaba =

1598 Mapuche uprising against Spanish colonists in Chile

- Part of the Arauco War
Date	December 23, 1598
Location	Curalaba, on the banks of the Lumaco River, 25 kilometers from Angol 37°55′S 72°53′W
Result	Mapuche victory

Belligerents
Spanish Empire	Mapuches

Commanders and leaders
Martín García Oñez de Loyola †	Pelantaru

Strength
50 Spanish and 300 Indian auxiliaries	600 warriors

Casualties and losses
All but two Spaniards were killed, as were most of the Indian auxiliaries.	?

The Battle of Curalaba (Spanish: Batalla de Curalaba pronounced [baˈtaʝa ðe kuɾaˈlaβa]) was a battle and an ambush in 1598 when Mapuche people led by Pelantaru defeated Spanish conquerors led by Martín García Óñez de Loyola at Curalaba, southern Chile. In Chilean historiography, where the event is often called the Disaster of Curalaba (Spanish: Desastre de Curalaba), the battle marks the end of the conquest (la conquista) period in Chile's history, although the fast Spanish expansion in the south had already been halted in the 1550s. The battle led to a general Mapuche uprising that resulted in Destruction of the Seven Cities. This severe crisis reshaped Colonial Chile and forced the Spanish to reassess their mode of warfare.

== Background ==
The Spanish started the Arauco War with the Battle of Reynogüelén in 1536.Diseases brought by the Spanish reduced the Mapuche population by up to 80% as it fell from around 1 million to 150,000. The Spanish believed by the 1590s that they were about to win the war.

Over 3,000 Mapuche were killed at the Battle of Andalien and it was one of the last battles in which they fought the Spanish using conventional tactics. As the war progressed the Mapuche turned to insurgency tactics. The Mapuche stopped attacking in large groups and instead used small groups with relay systems to ambush the Spanish. Horses were also incorporated into their fighting.

== Battle ==
The Mapuche were led into the battle by Pelantaro.

Martín García Óñez de Loyola was killed during the battle. This was the second time that the Spanish governor of Chile was killed by the Mapuche. A request for reinforcements was sent to Callao and Francisco de Quiñones arrived after a 16 day voyage from 12–18 May 1599.

== Aftermath ==
Seven Spanish cities across Chile were destroyed in the aftermath of the Spanish defeat. Mapuche influence spread to the east and reached as far as Buenos Aires.

The stage of the Arauco War with active fighting would continue until 1655 according to historian Sergio Villalobos before being relatively peaceful until its end in 1883. A frontier between the Spanish and Mapuche was established at the Biobío River and the Mapuche retained their independence until 1883.

== See also ==
- List of battles won by Indigenous peoples of the Americas

== Works cited ==
=== Books ===
- Choi, Imogen (2022). The Epic Mirror: Poetry, Conflict Ethics and Political Community in Colonial Peru. Boydell & Brewer. ISBN 9781855663473.

=== Journals ===
- Markham, Clements (1913). "Vasco Nuñez De Balboa, 1513-1913". The Geographical Journal. 41 (6). Royal Geographical Society: 517–527. doi:10.2307/1778076. JSTOR 1778076.
- Pavlic, Rodolfo (2018). "Explaining outcomes of asymmetric conflicts revisited - Explicando los resultados de los conflictos asimétricos: The Arauco War". Estudios Internacionales. 50 (189). University of Chile: 97–119. doi:10.2307/26659905. JSTOR 26659905.

== Sources ==
- Vicente Carvallo y Goyeneche, Descripcion Histórico Geografía del Reino de Chile (Description Historical Geography of the Kingdom of Chile), PDF E Libros from Memoria Chilena (History of Chile 1542–1788)
- Tomo I History 1542–1626, Tomo 8 de Colección de historiadores de Chile y de documentos relativos a la historia nacional. Santiago : Impr. del Ferrocarril, 1861. Primera parte. Tomo I; Capítulo LXXIX. Llega a Chile un refuerzo de tropa del Perú – Levanta el Gobernador una ciudad en la provincia de Cuyo – Visita el país meridional de su gobernacion, i los indios le quitan la vida.
