= Curaçao (disambiguation) =

Curaçao is an island in the Caribbean Sea which is a constituent country of the Kingdom of the Netherlands.

Curaçao may also refer to:

- Curaçao and Dependencies/Territory Curaçao, the name of the Dutch possession comprising Aruba, Bonaire, Curaçao, Saba, Sint Eustatius and Sint Maarten
- Curaçao (liqueur), from the island Curaçao
- Curacao (retail store), an American retailer (formerly La Curacao)
- La Curacao, a Salvadoran retailer in Central America, part of Unicomer Group

== See also ==
- Curacoa (disambiguation)
- Curassow
