= Tirúa River =

River in Central Chile

Coordinates: 38°20′35″S 73°30′3″W

The Tirua River is a river of the Bío Bío Region of Chile.

== Route ==
The Tirúa River begins at the confluence of the Palo Santo stream, which comes from the southeast, with the Poduco stream, which comes from the east. From its source, it flows northwest for 25 km until finally flowing into the sea after skirting the city of Tirúa.

In its middle and upper course it receives on its left the Santa Ana, Blenco, Macha, Cuyel and other tributaries, although the most important one is the Loncotripal.
