= Lirquén River =

River in central Chile

Lirquén River is a river of the Bío Bío Region of Chile.
