= Picoiquén River =

Coordinates: 37.76864°S 72.97941°W

Picoiquén

Location
- Country: Chile

Physical characteristics
- Mouth
  - location: Rehue River at Angol

The Picoiquén River (Spanish: río Picoiquén) is a river in Malleco Province of southern Chile. It is a tributary of Rehue River, which with it meet at the city of Angol.

== See also ==
- List of rivers of Chile
