= Quillen River =

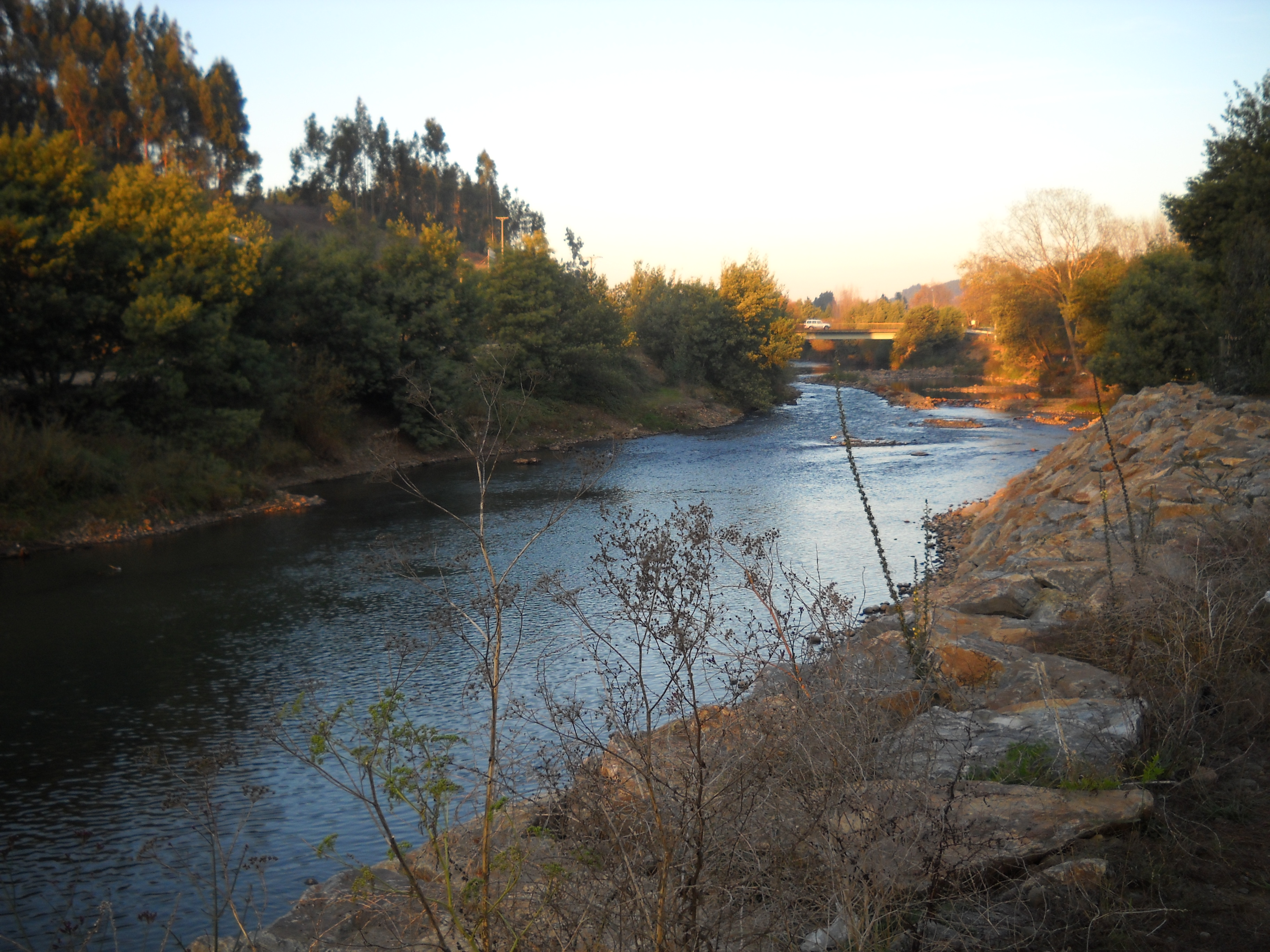
- Quillen River in Galvarino

Location
- Country: Chile

Physical characteristics
- Mouth: Cholchol River
  - coordinates: 38°26′42″S 72°54′44″W

The Quillen River is a river of Chile.

== See also ==
- List of rivers of Chile
