= Curaco Airport =

- IATA: none; ICAO: SCGP

Summary
- Airport type: Defunct
- Serves: Panguipulli, Chile
- Elevation AMSL: 820 ft / 250 m
- Coordinates: 39°32′14.0″S 072°21′22.5″W

Map
- Location of Curaco Airport in Chile

Runways
Direction	Length		Surface
Direction	ft	m	Surface
Closed
- Google Maps

Curaco Airport (Spanish: Aeropuerto Curaco, (ICAO: SCGP)) was an airstrip 12 kilometres (7.5 mi) north of Panguipulli, a city in the Los Ríos Region of Chile.

Google Earth Historical Imagery (8/28/2010) shows the runway outline with markings removed and plowed. The (12/27/2013) image shows crops planted, new fencelines crossing the area, and waterways moved. Current imagery (10/20/2016) shows additional fencelines and a new road crossing, with no trace of the former runway.

== See also ==
- Transport in Chile
- List of airports in Chile
