= Queuco River =

River in Chile

Queuco River is a river of the Biobío Region of Chile.
