= Esperanza River =

Location
- Country: Chile

The Esperanza River is a river of on Isla Grande de Tierra del Fuego in Magallanes Region, Chile.

== See also ==
- List of rivers of Chile
