= Maitenrehue River =

Coordinates: 37.60710°S 72.81975°W

Location
- Country: Chile

The Maitenrehue River is a river of Chile. It flows through the north of the Araucanía Region in the center of the country.

== See also ==
- List of rivers of Chile
