= Curaco River =

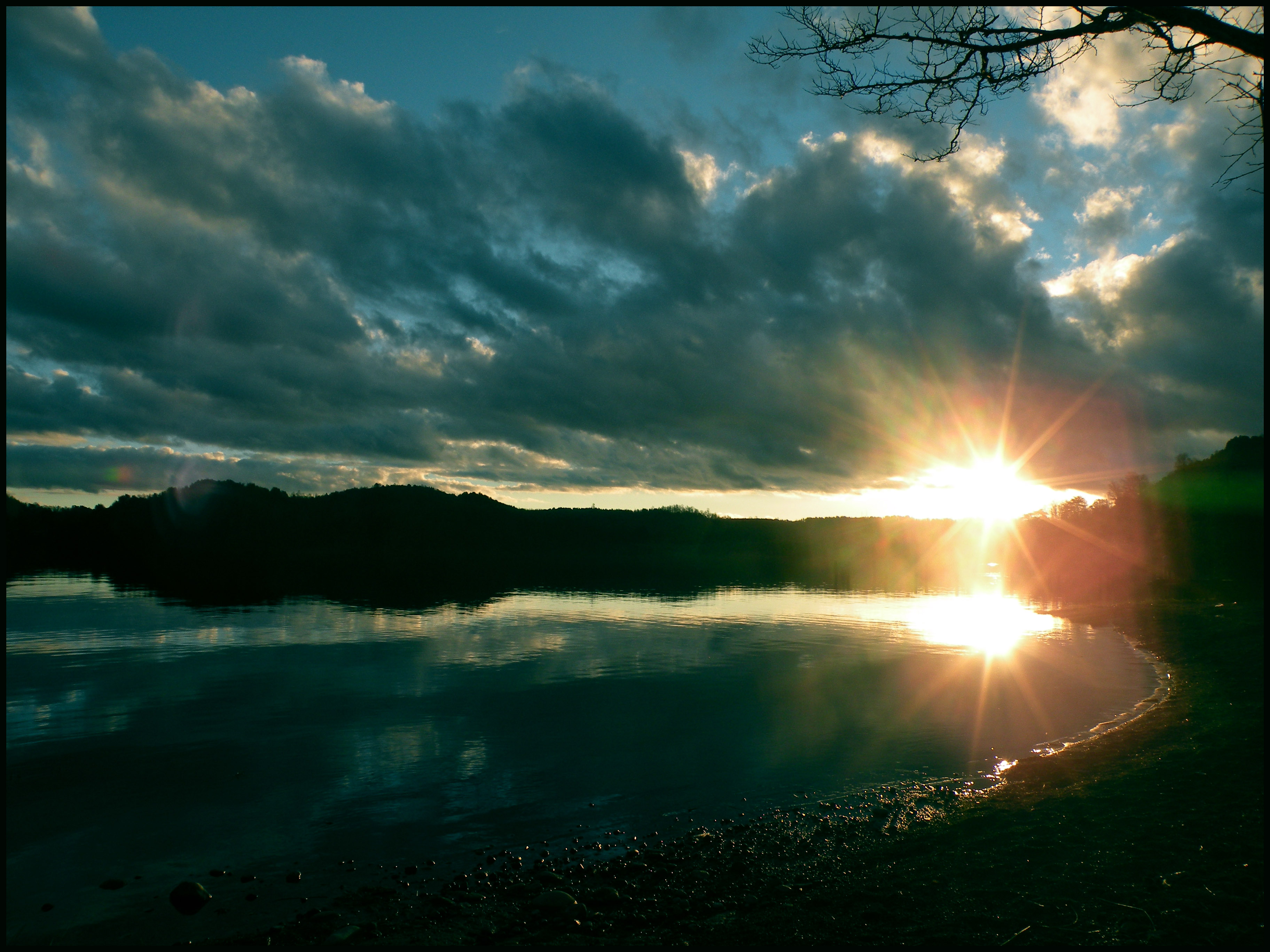

Location
- Country: Chile

Physical characteristics
- Mouth: Allipén River
  - coordinates: 39°01′28″S 72°14′49″W

The Curaco River is a river of Chile.

== See also ==
- List of rivers of Chile
