= Muco River =

Coordinates: 38.600°S 72.433°W

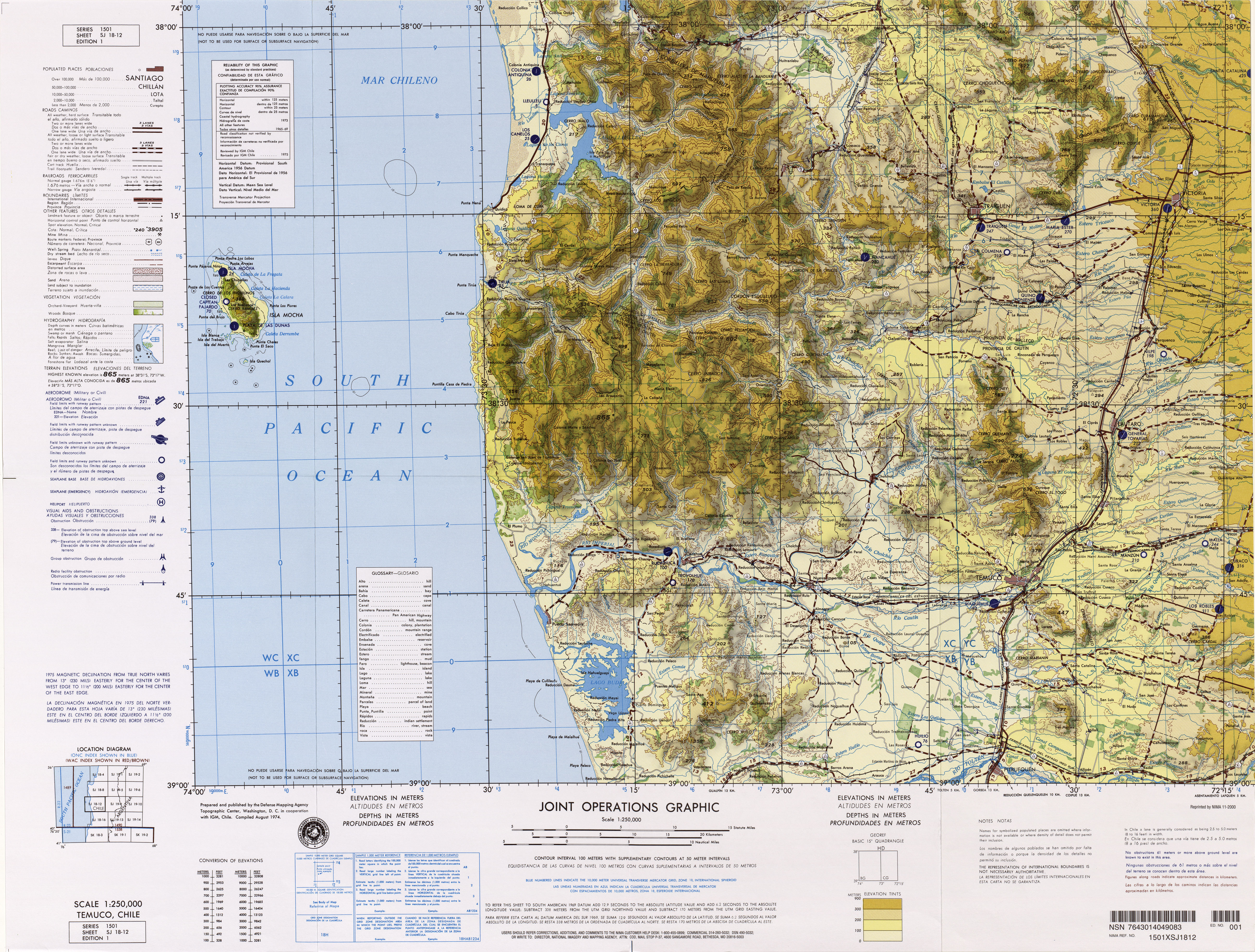
- Muco River, affluent of Cautin River, a few kilometers south of Lautaro

Location
- Country: Chile

The Muco River is a river in the Araucanía Region in Chile. It is a tributary of the Cautín River.

== See also ==
- List of rivers of Chile
