= Quino River =

Location
- Country: Chile

Physical characteristics
- Mouth
  - coordinates: 38°19′32″S 72°42′53″W

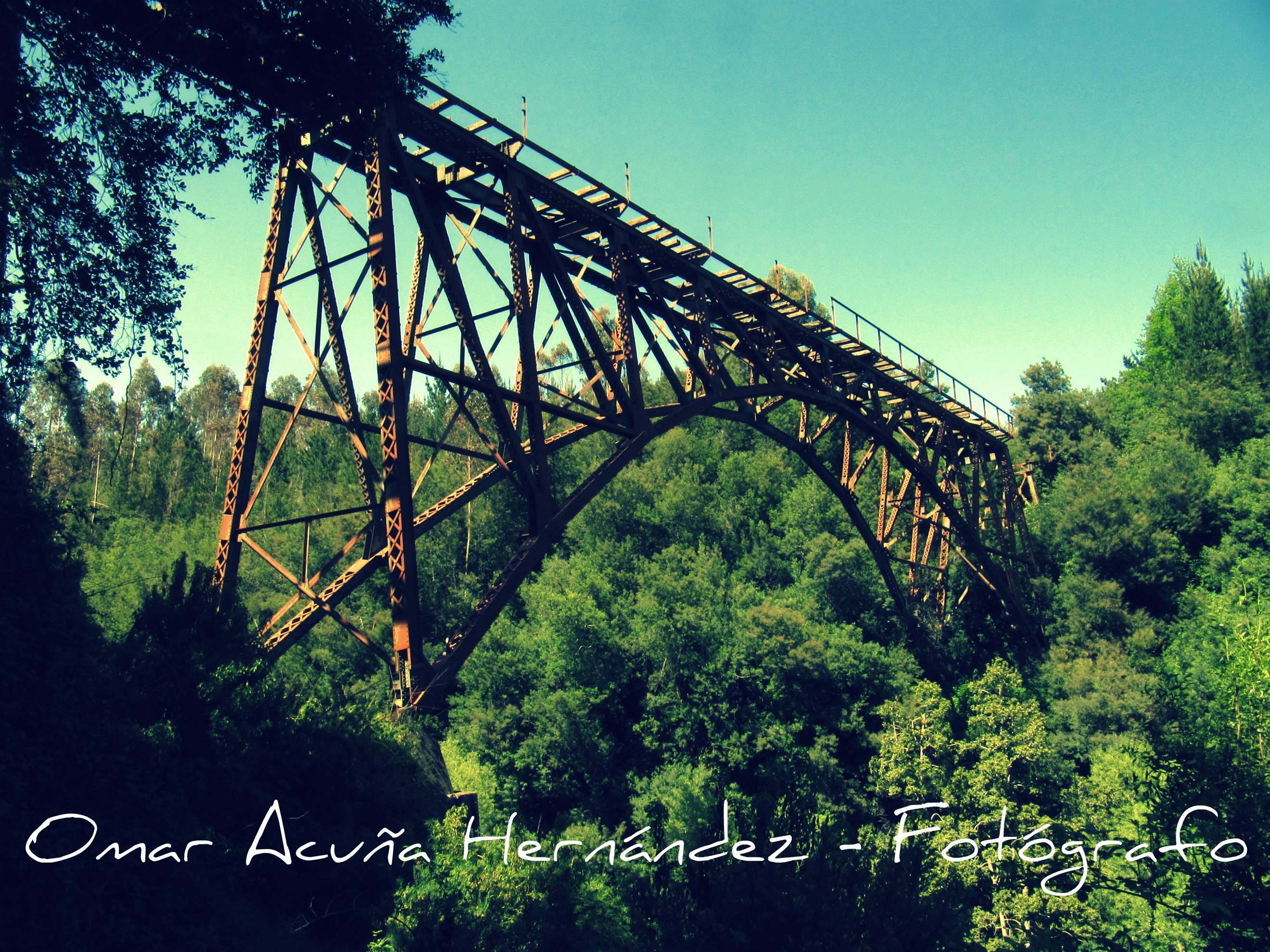
Railway bridge over the Quino River.

The Quino River is a river of Chile.

== See also ==
- List of rivers of Chile
