= Nicodahue River =

River in Chile

Coordinates: 37.59554°S 72.83935°W

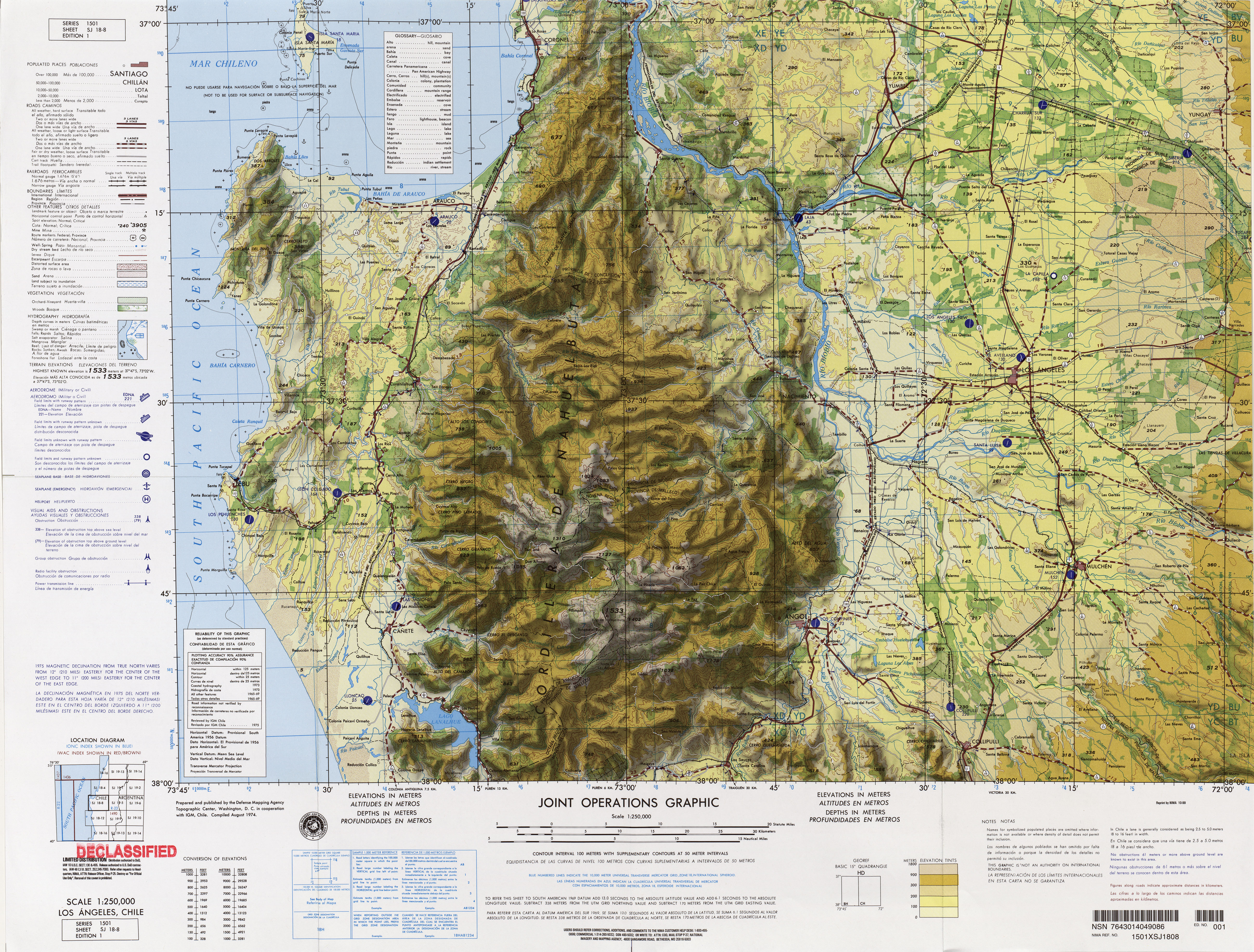
- Tavolevo (also Tavoleo), Nicodahue and Culenco Rivers between the Nahuelbuta Range and the Biobío River

Location
- Country: Chile

Physical characteristics
- Source
  - location: Nahuelbuta Range
- Mouth
  - location: Pacific Ocean

The Nicodahue River is a river of Chile.

== See also ==
- List of rivers of Chile
