= Catirai =

Region of the Moluche Aillarehue

Catirai or Catiray is the region of the Moluche Aillarehue of Catiray in old Araucanía. It is now the Santa Juana commune of the Concepción Province and the Nacimiento commune of the Bío Bío Province of the Bío Bío Region, of Chile. It includes the eastern slope of the mountains of the Nahuelbuta Range in its northern extremity where they descend toward the valley of the Biobío River and that contains the sources of the streams that flow into the Culenco River, (tributary of the Tavolevo River). Below the Tavolevo they flow directly into the Biobío. First the Rele River, then the riachuelos of Patagual and Pilún, Estero Huedilhue (in the valley of the town of Santa Juana) and the riachuelos of Pileo and Tricauco. Catiray comes from the Mapudungun callyíi, to cut, and of raigheii, the flower of the trees, meaning short flowers.

== See also ==
- Fort San Jerónimo de Millapoa
- Fort Santa Cruz de Oñez
- City of Santa Cruz de Coya

== Sources ==
- Francisco Solano Asta-Buruaga y Cienfuegos, Diccionario geográfico de la República de Chile (Geographic dictionary of the Republic of Chile), SEGUNDA EDICIÓN CORREGIDA Y AUMENTADA, NUEVA YORK, D. APPLETON Y COMPAÑÍA, 1899. pg. 135 Catiray
