= Rele River =

River in Chile

The Rele River is a river in the commune of Santa Juana. It has its origin to the south southeast of Santa Juana, from where it runs to the northeast from among the slopes of the heights of the Nahuelbuta Range and runs to the east to the Bio Bio River in which it empties a little above the confluence with the Laja River. It a river with a small volume and its course is 20 kilometers long. It has a tributary that joins it from the south, the Riachuelo Millapoa or de las Minas from the gold mines that in the sixteenth century were worked on its banks. Immediately on the north bank of the Rele River from the Millapoa was the location of the old city of Santa Cruz de Coya. At the mouth of the river was the old fort and town of Monterrey de la Frontera. A small town of Monterey now exists nearby. The Mapudungun name comes from the verb relen, “to face up”.

== Sources ==
- Francisco Solano Asta Buruaga y Cienfuegos, Diccionario geográfico de la República de Chile, SEGUNDA EDICIÓN CORREGIDA Y AUMENTADA, NUEVA YORK, D. APPLETON Y COMPAÑÍA. 1899. pg.649 Rele.—Riachuelo
