= Conquest of Chile =

Period of Chilean history, 1541-1600, period of Spanish conquest

The Conquest of Chile is a period in Chilean history that starts with the arrival of Pedro de Valdivia in Chile in 1541 and ends with the death of Martín García Óñez de Loyola in the Battle of Curalaba in 1598, and the subsequent destruction of the Seven Cities in 1598–1604 in the Araucanía region.

This was the period of Spanish conquest of territories, founding of cities, establishment of the Captaincy General of Chile, and defeats ending its further colonial expansion southwards. The initial conflict with the Mapuche extended well beyond the conquest period becoming known as the Arauco War, and the Spanish were never able to reassert control in Araucanía south of the Bío Bío River.

Spanish conquerors entering Chile were accompanied by thousands of yanakuna from the already subdued territories of the Inca Empire as well by a few African slaves. In the first years of the period the Spanish in Chile gained a reputation of being poorly dressed (roto) among the Spanish in Peru. In fact, in Santiago, lack of clothes made some Spaniards dress in hides from dogs, cats, sea lions, and foxes.

== Background ==
=== Chile at the time of the Spanish arrivals ===
According to traditional historiography, when the Spanish first came to Central Chile the territory had been under Inca rule for about 60 years. There are however dissenting views: recent works suggest at least 130 years of Inca presence in Central Chile, and historian Osvaldo Silva posits remarkably short chronologies of direct Inca rule and military involvement. According to Silva, the last Inca push towards the south was made as late as in the early 1530s.

The main settlements of the Inca Empire in Chile lay along the Aconcagua River, Mapocho River, and the Maipo River. Quillota, in the Aconcagua valley, was likely their foremost settlement. As it appears to be the case in the other borders of the Inca Empire, the southern border was composed of several zones: first, an inner, fully incorporated zone with mitimaes protected by a line of pukaras (fortresses) and then an outer zone with Inca pukaras scattered among allied tribes. This outer zone would according to historian José Bengoa have been located between the Maipo and Maule Rivers.

The largest indigenous population were the Mapuches living south of the Inca borders in the area spanning from the Itata River to Chiloé Archipelago. The Mapuche population between the Itata River and Reloncaví Sound has been estimated at 705,000–900,000 in the mid-16th century by historian José Bengoa. (Note: Note that the Chiloé Archipelago with its large population is not included in this estimate.) Mapuches lived in scattered hamlets, mainly along the great rivers of Southern Chile. All major population centres lay at the confluences of rivers. Mapuches preferred to build their houses on hilly terrain or isolated hills rather than on plains and terraces. The Mapuche people represented an unbroken culture dating back to as early as 600 to 500 BC. Yet Mapuches had been influenced over centuries by Central Andean cultures such as Tiwanaku. A cultural linkage of this sort may help explain parallels in mythological cosmologies among Mapuches, Huilliches and the peoples of the Central Andes.

Through their contact with Incan invaders Mapuches would have for the first time met people with state-level organization. Their contact with the Inca is thought to have given them a collective awareness to distinguishing between them and the invaders and uniting them into loose geopolitical units despite their lack of state organization.

Mapuche territory had an effective system of roads before the Spanish arrival as evidenced by the fast advances of the Spanish conquerors. According to Zavala and co-workers (2021), the widespread gold-related toponyms in Mapuche lands and early Spanish reports of gold objects, plus the easiness for the Spanish to find gold mines suggests that gold mining did occur in Pre-Hispanic Chile south of Itata River, well beyond the borders of the Inca Empire.

=== First Spaniards in Chile ===
The first Spanish subjects to enter the territory of what would become Chile were the members of the Magellan expedition that discovered the Straits of Magellan before completing the world's first circumnavigation.

The first permanent Spanish settler in Chile was Gonzalo Calvo de Barrientos who had left Peru in disrepute after a quarrel with the Pizarro brothers. The Pizarro brothers had accused Calvo de Barrientos of theft and had him cropped as punishment. Antón Cerrada joined Calvo de Barrientos in his exile.

Diego de Almagro ventured into present-day Bolivia and the Argentine Northwest in 1535. From there he crossed into Chile at the latitudes of Copiapó. Almagro's expedition was a failure as he did not find the riches he expected. Almagro's failed expedition gave the lands of Chile a bad reputation among the Spanish in Peru.

== Pedro de Valdivia ==
=== Expedition to Chile ===
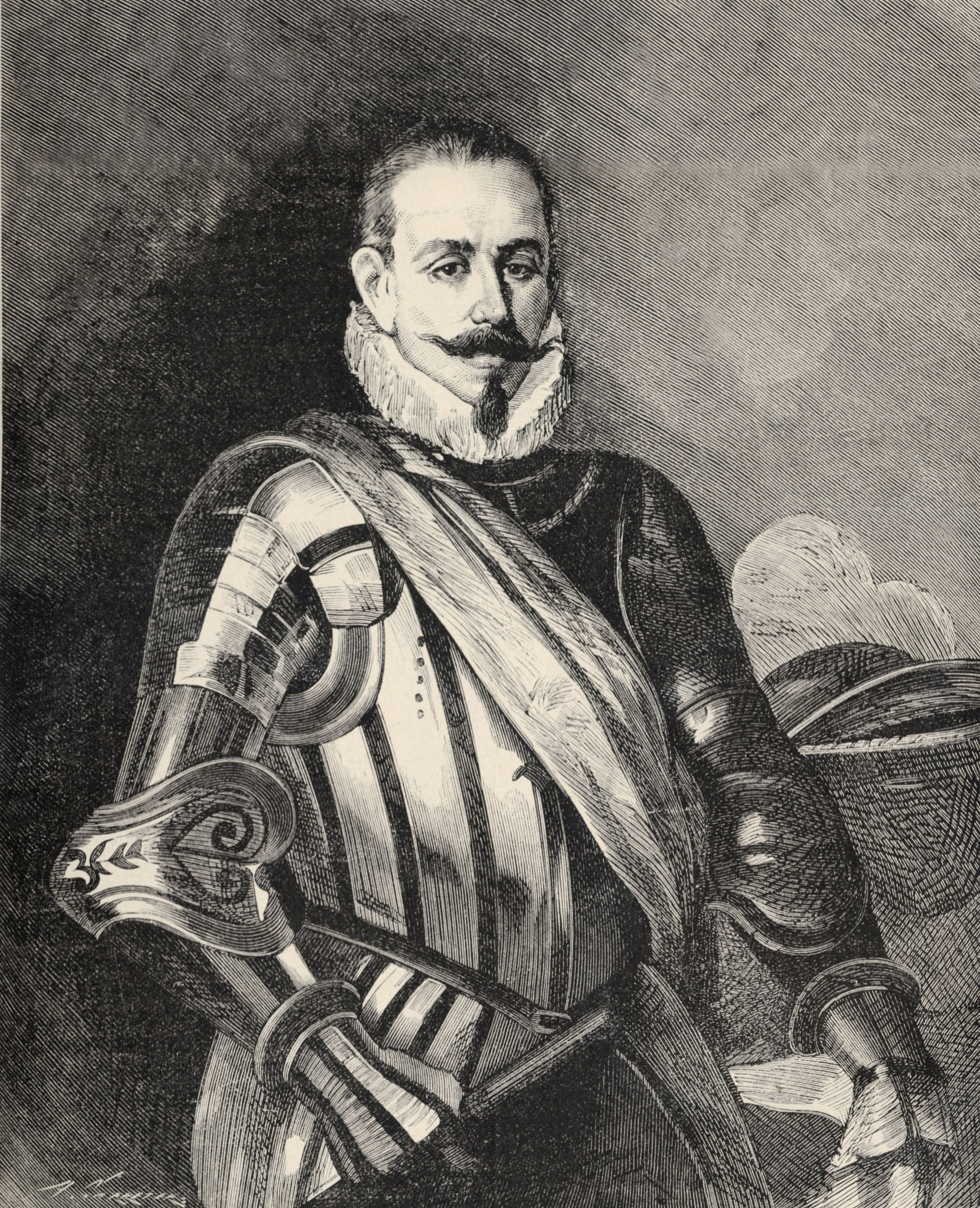
Pedro de Valdivia

In April 1539, Francisco Pizarro authorized Pedro de Valdivia as his lieutenant governor with orders to conquer Chile. That did not include monetary aid, which he had to procure on his own. Valdivia did so, in association with the merchant Francisco Martínez Vegaso, captain Alonso de Monroy, and Pedro Sanchez de la Hoz. Sanchez was the longtime secretary to Pizarro, who had returned from Spain with authorization from the king to explore the territories south of the Viceroyalty of Peru to the Strait of Magellan, also granting Valdivia the title of governor over lands taken from the indigenous people. This was the last campaign for the Spanish in Chile.

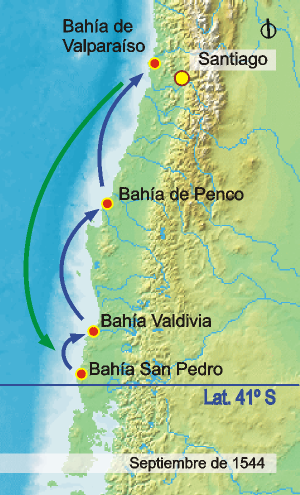
The Juan Bautista Pastene expedition to southern Chile in 1544.

Valdivia came to the Valley of Copiapo and took possession in the name of the King of Spain and named it Nueva Extremadura, for his Spanish homeland of Extremadura. Arriving in central Chile, Pedro de Valdivia was confronted by the toqui Michimalonco, who a couple of years before had expelled the Incas from the northern parts of the Mapuche lands. The Spanish and Mapuche faced each other in the Battle of Mapocho, in which Valdivia was victorious. Michimalonco decided to make a tactical retreat to gather more contingents and to expel the Spanish invaders with a surprise attack, but the Spanish learnt of this accumulation of forces and decided to head for where the Mapuche were accumulating for their surprise attack and at the Battle of Chillox, Michimalonco was defeated again.

The resounding victory left Pedro de Valdivia confident. On February 12, 1541, he founded the city of Santiago de la Nueva Extremadura on Huelen hill (present-day Santa Lucia Hill). After a few months of settlement, Pedro de Valdivia gathered his forces and went directly to attack the fortress of Michimalonco in Paidahuén, leading to the battle of Paidahuén where the Mapuches were completely defeated and Michimalonco taken prisoner. To obtain his freedom, Michimalonco offered the Spanish the ownership of the Marga Marga gold pans, belonging to Michimalonco since his expulsion of the Incas. With this, Michimalonco and his imprisoned men were released and Michimalonco set some of his vassals to work for the Spanish in their exploitation of the gold.

=== Governor ===
Valdivia had rejected the position and titles due him while Pizarro was alive, as it could have been seen as an act of treason. He accepted the titles after the death of Francisco Pizarro. Pedro de Valdivia was named Governor and Captain-General of the Captaincy General of Chile on June 11, 1541. He was the first Governor of Chile.

For long time Valdivia was preoccupied about other Spanish conquistadors disputing him what he saw as his domains. As long as he did not have a royal assignment this could very much happen. The Strait of Magellan was important in Valdivia's design for the Conquest of Chile, as he perceived it was part of his Chilean territory albeit he never reached so far south.

Valdivia organized the first distribution of encomiendas and of indigenous peoples among the Spanish immigrants in Santiago. The Chilean region was not as rich in minerals as Peru, so the indigenous peoples were forced to work on construction projects and placer gold mining. After a time of exploitation of the gold, Trangolonco, Michimalonco's brother, revolted and defeated the Spaniards in Marga Marga and destroyed the Spanish settlement, then defeated the Spanish in Concón and burned a ship under construction that was in the Bay, only a Spaniard and a slave escaped from the place. As ambassador, Trangolonco addressed all the indigenous chiefs of the Cachapoal, Maipo and Mapocho valleys to send their contingents and join Michimalonco, so that, just as he did with the Incas, he could expel the Spanish from Araucanía. This action managed to gather around 16,000 warriors.

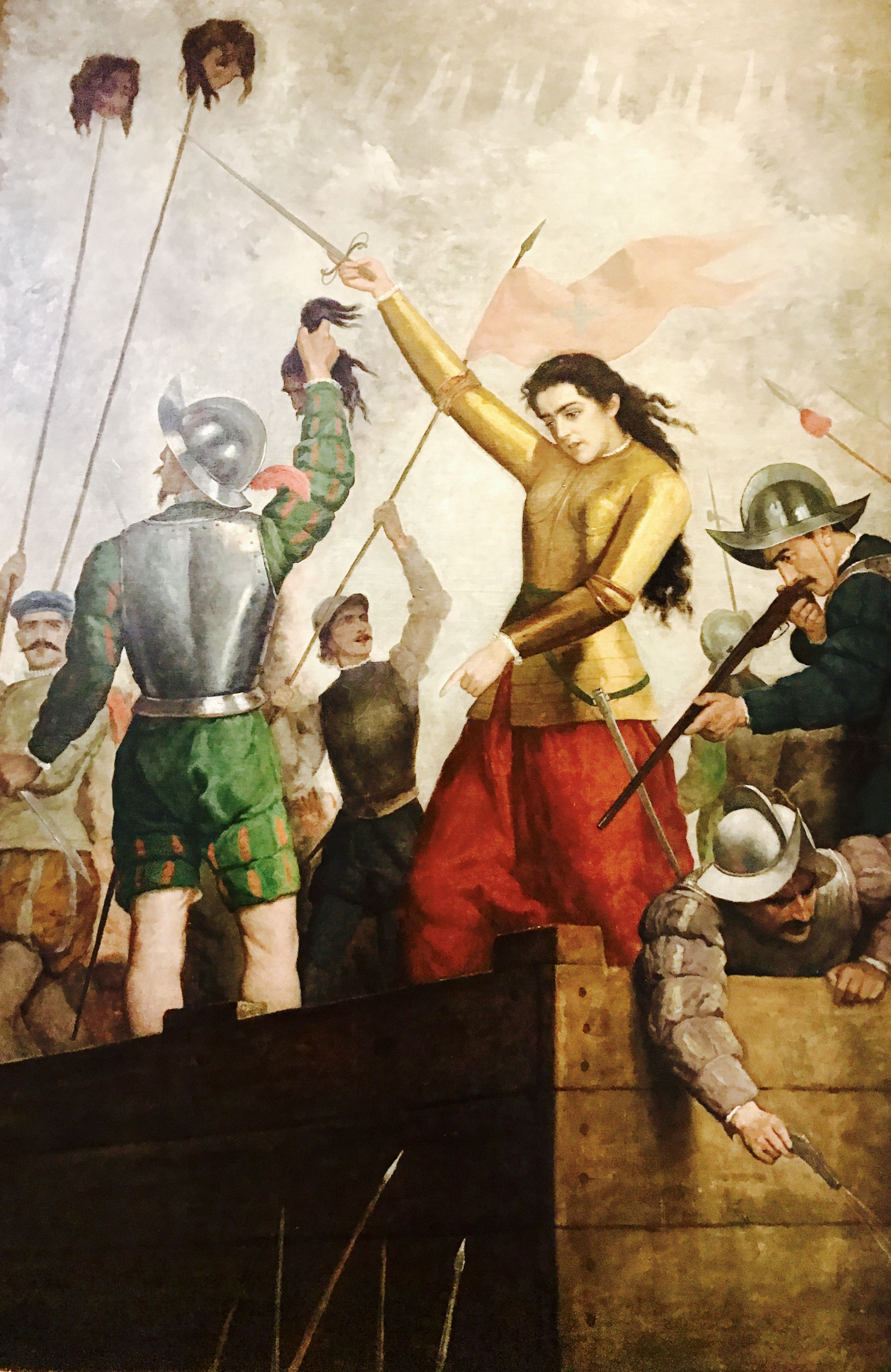
Doña Inés de Suárez in defending the city of Santiago

On September 11, 1541, Michimalonco attacked the Spanish and carried out the Destruction of Santiago, with only a handful of Spaniards barely surviving. Then Michimalonco applied the “empty war” which consisted of not giving the Spaniards any type of food or supplies so that they could go back to Peru. The Spanish barely resisted and there were a series of skirmishes between Spanish and Mapuche forces.

After a large number of confrontations between the hosts of Valdivia and those of Michimalonco, at the end of 1543 the Spanish managed to finish controlling the valleys of Cachapoal, Maipo and Aconcagua with the conquest by Pedro de Valdivia of three forts that Michimalonco maintained in the Andean mountain range of the Aconcagua River, which caused the withdrawal of Michimalonco's forces towards the north.

In 1544 Michimalonco headed to the Limarí River valley to cut off land communications between Chile and Peru for the Spanish. Michimalonco became strong in this sector with its Mapuche contingent added to the contingent of its Diaguita allies. After some victories against the Spanish advances, Pedro de Valdivia was forced to command his army himself and go to sustain the battle of Limarí, where the Mapuche-Diaguita hosts were defeated. Then Valdivia commanded Juan Bohon to found the city of La Serena in 1544 to guarantee that communications with Peru by land would not be interrupted again. The Juan Bautista Pastene expedition ventured to unexplored southern Chile in 1544. Arriving at the Bio-Bio River, started the Arauco War with the Mapuche people. The epic poem La Araucana (1576) by Alonso de Ercilla describes the Spanish viewpoint.

The Spanish won several battles, such as the Andalien battle, and Penco battle in 1550. The victories allowed Valdiva to found cities on the Mapuche homelands, such as Concepcion in 1550, La Imperial, Valdivia, and Villarrica in 1552, and Los Confines in 1553.

According to Pedro de Valdivia the Mapuche identified the Spanish as "ingas", meaning Incas, a word that stuck is now known under the form wingka meaning new-Inca. At the time of the initial contact Mapuches called horses "hueque ingas" in reference to the hueque according to Valdivia's letter to the Emperor.

In 1553, the Mapuches held a council at which they resolved to make war. They chose as their "toqui" (wartime chief) a strong man called Caupolicán and as his vice toqui Lautaro, because he had served as an auxiliary to the Spanish cavalry; he created the first Mapuche cavalry corps. With six thousand warriors under his command, Lautaro attacked the fort at Tucapel. The Spanish garrison was unable to withstand the assault and retreated to Purén. Lautaro seized and burned the fort and prepared his army certain that the Spaniards would attempt to retake Tucapel. Valdivia mounted a counter-attack, but he was quickly surrounded. He and his army was massacred by the Mapuches in the Battle of Tucapel.

== Aspects of the Spanish conquest ==
=== Background of the conquistadores ===
Most conquistadores were Spanish men. A few where from elsewhere, like Juan Valiente who was a black-skinned African. Juan de Bohon (Johann von Bohon), the founder of La Serena and Barlolomeo Flores (Barotholomeus Blumental) are said to have been Germans. Navigator Juan Bautista Pastene was of Genoese origin. Inés Suárez stands out as a rare female conquistadora.

=== Founding of cities ===
The conquest of Chile was not carried out directly by the Spanish Crown but by Spaniards that formed enterprises for those purposes and gathered financial resources and soldiers for the enterprise by their own. In 1541 an expedition (enterprise) led by Pedro de Valdivia founded Santiago initiating the conquest of Chile. The first years were harsh for the Spaniards mainly due to their poverty, indigenous rebellions, the poor battle terrain, and frequent conspiracies. The inhabitants of Santiago in the mid-16th century were notoriously poorly dressed as result of a lack of armour and food supplies, with some Spanish even resorting to dress with hides from dogs, cats, sea lions, and foxes. The second founding of La Serena in 1549 (initially founded in 1544 but destroyed by natives) was followed by the founding of numerous new cities in southern Chile halting only after Valdivia's death in 1553.

The Spanish colonization of the Americas was characterized by the establishments of cities in the middle of conquered territories. With the founding of each city a number of conquistadores became vecinos of that city being granted a solar and possibly also a chacra in the outskirts of the city, or a hacienda or estancia in more far away parts of the countryside. Apart from land, natives were also distributed among Spaniards since they were considered vital for carrying out any economic activity.

The cities founded, despite defeats in the Arauco War, were: Santiago (1541), La Serena (1544), Concepción (1550), La Imperial, Valdivia, Villarrica (1552), Los Confines (1553), Cañete (1557), Osorno (1558), Arauco (1566), Castro (1567), Chillán (1580), and Santa Cruz de Oñez (1595).

The destruction of the Seven Cities in 1600, and ongoing Arauco War stopped Spanish expansion southward.

=== Use of yanacona ===
Spanish conquerors were accompanied by thousands of yanakuna from the territories of today's Peru, Bolivia and Ecuador who also settled in Chile. Due to a matter of prestige, many yanakuna claimed to be from the former imperial capital of Cusco.

=== Gold mining ===
Early Spaniards extracted gold from placer deposits using indigenous labour. This contributed to usher in the Arauco War as native Mapuches lacked a tradition of forced labour like the Andean mita and largely refused to serve the Spanish. The key area of the Arauco War were the valleys around Cordillera de Nahuelbuta where the Spanish designs for this region was to exploit the placer deposits of gold using unfree Mapuche labour from the nearby and densely populated valleys. Deaths related to mining contributed to a population decline among native Mapuches. Another site of Spanish mining was the city of Villarrica. At this city the Spanish mined gold placers and silver. The original site of the city was likely close to modern Pucón. However at some point in the 16th century it is presumed the gold placers were buried by lahars flowing down from nearby Villarrica Volcano. This prompted settlers to relocate the city further west at its modern location.

Mining activity declined in the late 16th century as the richest part of placer deposits, which are usually the most shallow, became exhausted. The decline was aggravated by the collapse of the Spanish cities in the south following the battle of Curalaba (1598) which meant for the Spaniards the loss of both the main gold districts and the largest indigenous labour sources.

Compared to the 16th and 18th centuries, Chilean mining activity in the 17th century was very limited.

== Southern limit of the conquests ==
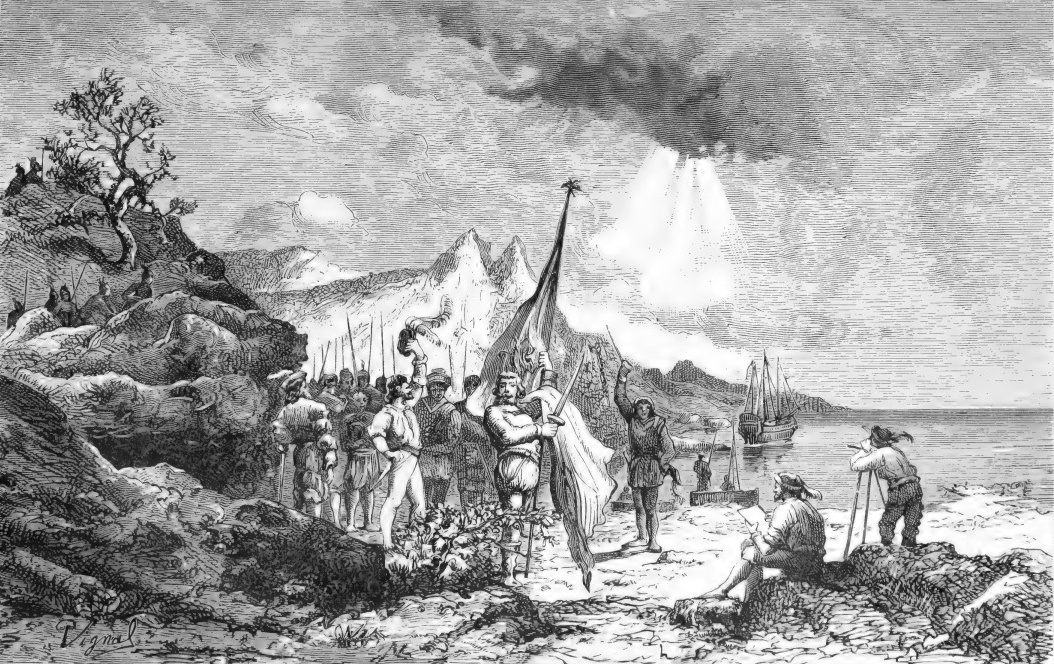
Juan Ladrillero took possession of the Strait of Magellan for the Governorate of Chile and the King of Spain in 1558.

Pedro de Valdivia sought originally to conquer all of southern South America to the Straits of Magellan (53° S). He did however only reach Reloncaví Sound (41°45' S). Later in 1567 Chiloé Archipelago (42°30' S) was conquered, from there on southern expansion of the Spanish Empire halted. The Spanish are thought to have lacked incentives for further conquests south. The indigenous populations were scarce and had ways of life that differed from the sedentary agricultural life the Spanish were accustomed to. The harsh climate in the fjords and channels of Patagonia may also have deterred further expansion. Indeed, even in Chiloé did the Spanish encounter difficulties to adapt as their attempts to base the economy on gold extraction and a "hispanic-mediterranean" agricultural model failed.

In October 1557, Governor García Hurtado de Mendoza sent another exploratory squad of 70 men under the command of Juan Ladrillero. They were charged with mapping the coastline and surveying the region's flora, fauna, and ethnography. On August 16, 1558, Ladrillero arrived in the Atlantic Ocean, becoming the first navigator to cross the Strait of Magellan in both directions.

== Timeline of events ==
Year	Date	Event
1540	December	Pedro de Valdivia takes possession of Chile in the name of the King of Spain.
1541	February 12	Santiago is founded.
1541	September 11	Destruction of Santiago. Michimalonco leads a Picunche attack on Santiago, the city is severely damaged but the attack is repelled.
1544	September 4	La Serena is founded by Juan Bohón.
1549	January 11	La Serena is destroyed by natives.
1549	August 26	La Serena is refounded.
1551	October 5	Concepción is founded.
1552		San Felipe de Rauco, La Imperial and Villarrica are founded.
1552	February 9	The city of Valdivia is founded by Pedro de Valdivia.
1553		Los Confines is founded.
1553	December 25	The battle of Tucapel takes place, governor Pedro de Valdivia is killed after the battle.
1554	February 23	The battle of Marihueñu takes place, Concepción is abandoned and destroyed.
1554	October 17	Jerónimo de Alderete is appointed governor of Chile in Spain by the king but dies on his journey to Chile.
1557	April 1	Francisco de Villagra defeats the Mapuches and kills their leader Lautaro at the battle of Mataquito.
1557	April 23	The new governor García Hurtado de Mendoza arrives in La Serena.
1557	June	García Hurtado de Mendoza arrives in the bay of Concepcion and builds a fort at Penco, then defeats the Mapuche army trying to dislodge him.
1557	October 10	García Hurtado de Mendoza defeats the Mapuche army in the Battle of Lagunillas.
1557	November 7	García Hurtado de Mendoza defeats Caupolicán in the Millarupe.
1558	January 11	Cañete founded by Mendoza.
1558	February 5	Pedro de Avendaño captured the Mapuche toqui Caupolicán, later executed by impalement in Cañete.
1558	March 27	Osorno is founded.
1558	December 13	Battle of Quiapo, Mendoza defeats the Mapuche and San Felipe de Araucan rebuilt.
1559	January 6	Concepción is refounded.
1561		Francisco de Villagra succeeds García Hurtado de Mendoza as governor.
1563		Cañete is abandoned.
1563	July 22	Francisco de Villagra dies and is succeeded as governor by his cousin Pedro de Villagra. San Felipe de Araucan is soon abandoned.
1563	August 29	The territories of Tucumán are separated from the Captaincy General of Chile and transferred to the Real Audiencia of Charcas.
1564	February	Concepción is unsuccessfully sieged by native Mapuches.
1565		A Real Audiencia is established in Concepción.
1566	January	San Felipe de Araucan is refounded.
1567		With the founding of Castro the dominions of the Captaincy General of Chile are extended into Chiloé Archipelago.
1570	February 8	The 1570 Concepción earthquake affects all of south-central Chile.
1575		The Real Audiencia of Concepción is abolished.
1575	December 16	The 1575 Valdivia earthquake affects all of southern Chile.
1576	April	Valdivia is flooded by a Riñihuazo caused by the 1575 Valdivia earthquake.
1578	December 5	Valparaíso is plundered by Francis Drake, the first corsair in Chilean waters.
1580	June 26	Chillán is founded.
1584	March 25	Rey Don Felipe is founded in the Straits of Magellan by Pedro Sarmiento de Gamboa.
1587		Thomas Cavendish finds Rey Don Felipe as a ruin city.
1594	May	Fort of Santa Cruz de Oñez is founded and becomes the city of Santa Cruz de Coya the following year.
1598	December 21	The battle of Curalaba takes place, governor Martín García Óñez de Loyola is killed during the battle.
1599		Los Confines, Santa Cruz de Coya and Valdivia are destroyed.
1599		The Real Situado, an annual payment to finance the Arauco War, is established.
1600		La Imperial is destroyed.
1602		Villarrica is destroyed.
1602	March 13	A fort is established in the ruins of Valdivia.
1603	February 7	The last inhabitants of Villarrica surrender to the Mapuches and became captives.
1604		Arauco and Osorno are destroyed.
1604	February 3	The fort at Valdivia is abandoned.

== See also ==
- Incas in Central Chile
- Spanish colonization of the Americas
- Spanish conquest of Peru
- Viceroyalty of Peru
