= Oidor =

Judge of a real audiencia within the Spanish Empire

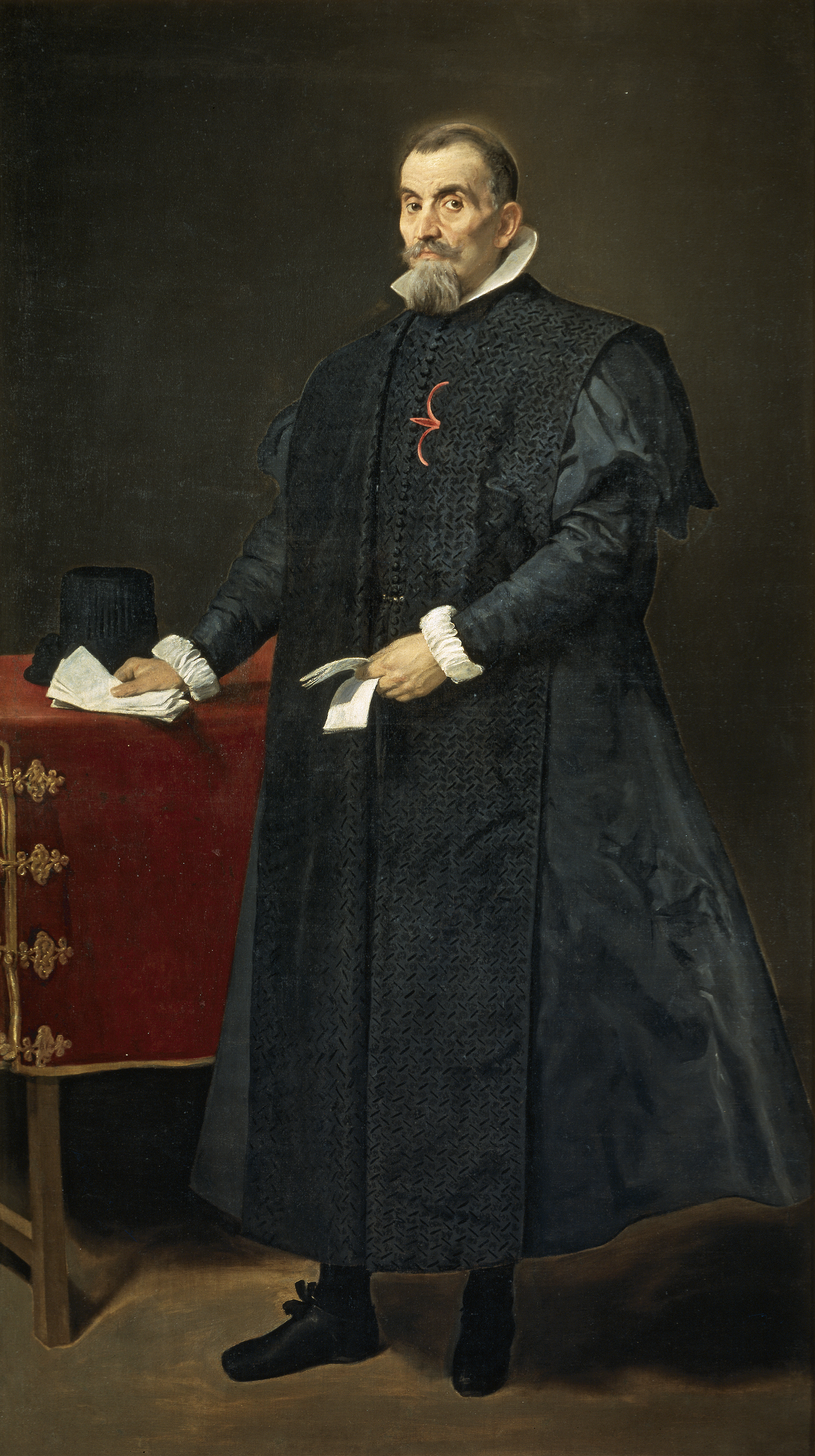
A portrait of Diego del Corral y Arellano, oidor of the Council of Castile, by the painter Diego Velázquez

An oidor (Spanish pronunciation: [ojˈðoɾ]) was a judge of the Royal Audiencias and Chancillerías, originally courts of Kingdom of Castile, which became the highest organs of justice within the Spanish Empire. The term comes from Spanish oír 'to hear', referring to the judge's obligation to listen to the parts of a judicial process, particularly during the phase of pleas.

== Origins ==
The Cortes of Alcalá of 1348 asked that King Henry II of Castile publicly hear cases at least once or twice a week along with his advisors because, under medieval Castilian jurisprudence, the king was to personally hear all cases that fell under his jurisdiction, but the caseload was becoming too great. The Cortes also asked the King to delegate some of his powers to his advisors, so that they "could judge in his name."

The documents of the Cortes of Alcalá began to refer to these delegates as oidores, and the new institution they formed as the audiencia. This early audiencia was still closely tied to the king's personal right to judge. In reviewing the cases before them, oidores relied on summaries prepared by court lawyers known as relatores.

== Spanish America and the Philippines ==
As the Crown of Castile found its territories rapidly expanding half a world away during the Spanish colonization of the Americas and the Spanish Philippines, it found it necessary to grant its overseas oidores functions and powers which in the mother country normally fell to other officials. Thus, the oidores of the overseas audiencias functioned as judges of the audiencia, and as magistrates overseeing the sale of the Holy Crusade indulgences (juez de la Santa Cruzada), mortgages and ground rents (juez de censos), probate issues (juez de bienes de difuntos), and legal separation (oidor juez de casados). Oidores often had kinship ties to mercantile elites in the Philippines, and channeled policy recommendations desired by merchants to King via the Consejo de Indias in Madrid.

In the audiencias in which the criminal judges (alcaldes del crimen) met as a separate chamber, such as those of Mexico City and Lima, it was not uncommon for one person to serve as both oidor (civil judge) and an alcalde del crimen. Upon the death or incapacity of a governor or viceroy, either the senior oidor (oidor decano) or the audiencia as a whole would serve as the interim governor or viceroy, depending on the specific law of the territory.

== Marriage disputes ==
The oidor de casados was a special type of judge that arose to deal with the de facto separation of many married couples during the colonization of the New World and the fact that, after leaving Spain, many married men abandoned their lawful wives and entered into informal relationships with either native or European women. In order to deal with this, the crown felt it was necessary to create this office to legally compel the reconciliation of the married couple.

An example of this problem is the notorious case of Pedro de Valdivia. The Audiencia of Lima, under the direction of President (and acting viceroy) Pedro de la Gasca forced Valdivia to repudiate his mistress, Inés de Suárez, and to bring his wife Marina Ortíz de Gaete to Chile. Over time, the powers of the oidor de casados evolved to cover all types of lawsuits between a married couple.

== Ecclesiastical judges ==
Due to the general use of the word oidor, the term was also applied to the clerics who served as judges in ecclesiastical courts, although they had nothing to do with the audiencias.
