= Corazón mestizo =

Chilean historical musical

Corazón mestizo is a Chilean historical musical based on the epic poem by Spaniard Alonso de Ercilla, which relates the first phrase of the Arauco War between the Spaniards and Mapuches. The musical was adapted and directed by Alejandro Pinto.

The plot revolves around the Spanish efforts to conquer Chile, which are frustrated by the rebellions of the Mapuche to defend their territory. The protagonists are Inés de Suárez and Pedro de Valdivia, and Guacolda and Lautaro, both Mapuches.

== Productions ==
The musical had a cast of thirty actors and utilized stereoscopic technology for the scenery, a technique also used for the Palacio de La Moneda in 2010 to celebrate Chile's Bicentennial. The show was the stage debut of José Alfredo Fuentes, a well-known singer. The show was choreographed by Christian Ocaranza and produced by Arteamerica. The show's scenery was set up with 3D mapping.

Corazón Mestizo was initially scheduled to premiere in July 2011 in Temuco, but it ultimately premiered in Osorno on 23 November 2011. Due to weather conditions it could not be held outdoors at the Plaza de Armas, as planned, so it was moved to the Gimnasio Espanol, which had a 2,000 person capacity. Although the space was small, and the experience of most of the performers should have allowed them to be heard throughout, the sound was the most criticized element of the performance, causing annoyance from audience members who couldn't hear well. Tito Beltrán commented that the engineer in charge of sound didn't consider that there were 29 people on stage with only seven microphones, causing actors to lend each other microphones depending on who was performing.

The performance scheduled for 30 November 2011, at the Movistar Arena in Santiago de Chile was postponed to 11 January 2012, after mezzosoprano Mirella Tironi, who played protagonist Inés de Suárez, came down with pneumonitis. Singer Tito Beltrán criticized this move, pointing out the use of understudies in other parts of the world.

On 14 April 2012, they performed at Medialuna de Rancagua, where they received positive reviews from critics and audience members.

In 2013 they performed on 7 June in front of the San Marcos Church in Arica, with 20 musicians from the Arica Orchestra joining the show's orchestra.

== Cast ==
Character	2011-2013 Tour
Alonso de Ercilla	Tito Beltrán
Inés de Suárez	Mirella Tironi
Pedro de Valdivia	Gerardo Wistuba
Rodrigo de Quiroga	Santiago Tupper
García Hurtado de Mendoza	Nicolás Pinto
Francisco de Villagra	Andrés Zará
Capellán Pozo	Julio González
Juan Gómez	Javier Ramírez
Lautaro	Rubén Álvarez
Guacolda	Daniela Castillo
Caupolicán	Miguel Ángel Pellao
Colocolo	Roberto Díaz Castillo
Angol	Esteban Toro
Ayelén	Valeria Landa
Glaura	María Isabel Sobarzo
Young Lautaro	Sebastián Vilches
Tucapel	Pablo Vargas
Mañke	Paulina López
Tegualda	Bárcara Moscoso
Sayeññ	Gloria Marín
Andresillo	Juan Luis Urbina
Fresia	Maria Graciela Vera
Machi	Camila Méndez
Galvarino	Raul Canales
Lincoyán	Yeric Núñez
Nehuén	Guillermo Alfaro
Chorus	Francisca Galleguillos, Pachara Poonsawat, Andrea Waissbluth, Karen Matus

== Songs ==
=== Act I ===
1. Defensores de la Fe / Coro Flagelantes
2. Chile provincia y señalada / Alonso de Ercilla and chorus
3. No ha habido rey aún (parte 1) / Chorus
4. Amarnos esta noche / Pedro de Valdivia e Inés de Suárez
5. No ha habido rey aún (parte 2) / Chorus
6. Solo estoy / Colocolo
7. Cortadles una mano / Pedro de Valdivia
8. Volverán a ser nuestros / Machi and Leftraru
9. Edificio y palos / Coro hombres
10. Engañadas fuimos / Coro mujeres and Guacolda
11. Caciques de mi pueblo (parte 1) / Colocolo
12. Caciques de mi pueblo (parte 2) / Colocolo
13. Me decían la Inés / Inés de Suárez
14. He vivido entre enemigos / Lautaro

=== Act II ===
1. El enemigo riguroso / Alonso de Ercilla
2. Aprenderemos a luchar / Lautaro and Guacolda
3. Yo derroté al español / Caupolicán
4. Morir antes de tiempo debe ser / Inés de Suárez
5. Me propones una tregua / Lautaro and Marcos Veas
6. Dueños de la fé / Semichorus 1 and 2
7. Nuestro deber es preñar / García Hurtado de Mendoza
8. Calla corazón / Guacolda and Lautaro
9. Ese hombre Lautaro / Marcos Veas
10. Oíd al poeta / Juan de Pineda
11. Duelo, duelo / Alonso de Ercilla
12. Estamos en guerra / García Hurtado de Mendoza
13. Del infame padre / Fresia
14. Aquella noche / Alonso de Ercilla
15. Ay de mí... Ay de ti... / Guacolda and Machi
16. Mix final / Chorus
