= Marina Ortiz de Gaete =

Wife of the Spanish conquistador, Pedro de Valdivia

Marina Ortiz de Gaete González (c. 1509 – April 1592) was the wife of Pedro de Valdivia, and played an important role in the politics of the conquest and early history of the Captaincy General of Chile.

== Life ==
Marina (sometimes María) Ortiz de Gaete was born around 1509, in Zalamea de la Serena, Spain, the daughter of Francisco Ortiz de Gaete and of Leonor González Gutiérrez. In 1527, she married Pedro de Valdivia, but he departed in 1535 to search for fortune in the new world. They would never meet again, though he always kept in touch and sent her money until the end of his days.

Once in Peru, Valdivia became attached to the widow Inés de Suárez, who was to accompany him to Chile as his mistress. Nonetheless, a discontented faction from Chile managed to have him tried in Lima in 1548, accused of tyranny, malfeasance of public funds and public immorality. One of the charges levelled against him was that he, being married, openly lived with Inés de Suárez "...in the manner of man and wife and they sleep in one bed and they eat in one dish...". In exchange for being freed, and for his confirmation as Royal Governor, he agreed to relinquish Suárez and to bring to Chile his wife. He was also ordered to marry Inés off, which he did upon his return to Chile in 1549, to one of his captains, Rodrigo de Quiroga. As recognition for his services Valdivia was finally appointed as adelantado and won the royal assent to his coveted title of Governor of Chile, returning to the settlement with his position and prestige considerably strengthened.

=== In America ===
Marina was sent for, and left Spain in November, 1553, in the nao of Juan de Mondragón. A large retinue of family travelled with her, including at least a brother and two nieces. As she arrived to Peru in 1554, she discovered that Valdivia had died the previous year after being captured by Mapuche in the battle of Tucapel. She was also detained in Lima by Viceroy Andrés Hurtado de Mendoza, who offered her a large sum in gold in exchange for her not continuing the journey to Chile, agreeing to return to Spain and renouncing all rights to her husband's inheritance. She refused and after further delays, she finally arrived in Chile in 1555. She lived the rest of her long life between Santiago and Concepción and died at the age of approximately 83; between March 30 and April 12, 1592.

== Additional information ==
=== See also ===
- Pedro de Valdivia
- Inés de Suárez
- Arauco War
- Mapuche people

=== Sources ===
- Chisholm, Hugh, ed. (1911). "Chile § History" . Encyclopædia Britannica. Vol. 6 (11th ed.). Cambridge University Press. p. 153.
- Barros Arana, Diego (1873). Proceso de Pedro de Valdivia i Otros Documentos Inéditos Concernientes a Este Conquistador (PDF) (in Spanish). Santiago, Chile: Librería Central de Augusto Raymond. p. 392.
- Cunninghame, Graham; Robert Bontine (1973). Pedro de Valdivia, Conqueror of Chile. Boston, MA: Milford House Inc.
- Góngora Marmolejo, Alonso de (1960). Historia de Todas las Cosas que han Acaecido en el Reino de Chile y de los que lo han gobernado (1536-1575). Crónicas del Reino de Chile (in Spanish). Madrid, Spain: Atlas. pp. 75–224.
- Mariño de Lobera, Pedro (1960). Fr. Bartolomé de Escobar (ed.). Crónica del Reino de Chile, escrita por el capitán Pedro Mariño de Lobera... reducido a nuevo método y estilo por el Padre Bartolomé de Escobar (1593). Crónicas del Reino de Chile (in Spanish). Madrid, Spain: Atlas. pp. 227–562.
- Medina, José Toribio (1906). Diccionario Biográfico Colonial de Chile (PDF) (in Spanish). Santiago, Chile: Imprenta Elzeviriana. pp. 621–623.
- Roa y Urzúa, Luis de (1935). La Familia de Don Pedro de Valdivia, Conquistador de Chile (PDF) (in Spanish). Sevilla: Imprenta de la Gavidia. p. 119.
- Valdivia, Pedro de (1960). Cartas. Crónicas del Reino de Chile (in Spanish). Madrid, Spain: Atlas. pp. 1–74.
- "Pedro de Valdivia". Vi-E Educación al día (in Spanish).
