= Destruction of Santiago =

1541 battle in Chile

The Destruction of Santiago, now the capital of Chile, occurred on September 11, 1541. It was a confrontation between Spanish conquistadors and a coalition of Mapuche -Picunche tribes.

== Background ==
The execution of Solier and his companions, who had started a rebellion, the destroying of the Marga Marga mine after the battle of Marga Marga, and the burning of the ship at Concón, after the battle of Concón, both battles led and won by Trangolonco, brother of the Toqui Michimalonco, had lowered the spirits of the Spanish conquistadores. Apart from living in fear of an attack or rebellion from the indigenous peoples at any moment, these events had also reduced their numbers. With thirteen dead at Concón and five executed with Solier, the conquistadores were reduced to approximately 130 men, women, and children.

Upon seeing that the Spanish were low in numbers, divided amongst themselves, and not receiving reinforcements, the Mapuche became motivated to unify themselves. All of the natives from Aconcagua, Santiago, and Cachapoal united under the single command of toqui Michimalonco with the intent of attacking the Spaniards and expelling them from their lands.

Pedro de Valdivia believed that it would be preferable to disperse the indigenous forces before they could strike. For this reason, he chose 90-100 men and left for the Cachapoal valley at full gallop. Left behind in Santiago were 32 cavalry, 18 men armed with arquebuses, and between 300 and 350 yanakuna under the command of the Lieutenant General, Alonso de Monroy.

The Mapuche knew of the Spanish's movements, however, since there were spies among the friendly natives and the yanakuna. When they heard that Valdivia was leaving with his men, they decided that it was the opportune time to get rid of the foreigners.

== The Attack on Santiago ==
At 4:00 a.m. on September 11, an army of natives, numbered between 8,000 and 10,000, came out of the forests surrounding Santiago. One of the guards, Santiago de Azoca, sounded the alarm and the defenders immediately took their posts, which had been previously assigned by Monroy and the maestre de campo Francisco de Villagra.

The Mapuche, protected from the arquebus shots by the palisade, rained down arrows and stones upon the city's defenders. The Spaniards were able to resist until sunrise, when they were able to neutralize the attack through effective means, but their low numbers made respite impossible. One after another, the conquistadores received wounds from minor to medium severity. Each wounded soldier would withdraw from the front line to be bandaged with a shirt sleeve or rag by Inés de Suarez, and would then return to his post. The natives, angered by the Spaniard's relentless resistance, set fire to the nearby hay farms. The defenders couldn't try to extinguish the flames without abandoning the trenches, and the Mapuche would not have let them, either. They had to withdraw to the plaza, which became the last and only point of resistance. The account is given that Pedro Sancho de la Hoz left his prison dragging his shackles behind him and, waving around a spear, took a place amid the defense. With a warning from Alonso de Monroy, he was allowed to remove his shackles and he fought briefly until the end of the encounter. A clergyman, Father Lobo, also helped in the battle, fighting as "a wolf amongst sheep" at the front of a cavalry charge.

=== The Plan of Inés de Suarez ===
After fighting for nearly 12 hours, the Spanish resistance was being defeated. Two men had already died, almost everyone was wounded, and after endless fighting with spears and sabers, the exhaustion was beginning to overwhelm them.

But Inés de Suárez, the mistress of Pedro de Valdivia, had an idea that would save the lives of the Spanish conquistadors. Seeing the death of the seven captive caciques as the only hope for salvation, Inés proposed decapitating them and throwing their heads among the natives in order to cause panic. Many men thought defeat was inevitable and opposed the plan, arguing that keeping the native leaders alive was their only chance for survival. But Inés insisted in moving forward with her plan and she set off for the house where the leaders were being held. It was protected by Francisco Rubio and Hernando de la Torre, to whom she gave the orders of execution. Witnesses of the event narrate that de la Torre, upon asking in what manner they should kill the prisoners, received as his answer from Inés, “in this manner.” She then took the sword from the guard and decapitated Quilicanta and subsequently all of the caciques taken as hostages. She then, by her own hand, threw their heads among the attackers.

This gesture was interpreted by the natives as a warning that if they did not retreat, they would suffer the same fate as their chiefs. Incredibly, they turned around and started the retreat even though they had victory in their hands.

== Aftermath ==
Almost all of the conquistadores were wounded and they lost two men, fifteen horses, and a high number of indigenous aides. But these losses were insignificant when compared to the disaster caused by the fire in the city. Approximately half of the city was burned to the ground.

Alonso de Monroy sent a missive to Pedro de Valdivia, in the which he counted what remained from the fire as "the precious horses, their arms,...two small pigs, a sucking-pig, a cock and hen, and about two handfuls of wheat." Pedro de Valdivia came back to Santiago four days after the assault. Upon receiving the news of the attack, he had marched from Cachapoal with fourteen of his men, leaving the rest behind with Pedro Gomez so that they could continue in the fight against the natives of Cachapoal.

The Mapuche expected a fierce punishment from Valdivia once he returned, but he, understanding that prolonging the conflict would be the worst option, tried to reach a resolution. The relative peace that followed allowed the Spanish to reconstruct the city, this time with adobe to reduce the consequences of any future fire.
