= Inés of My Soul =

2006 novel by Isabel Allende

- First edition
- Author: Isabel Allende
- Original title: Inés del alma mía
- Language: Spanish
- Genre: Historical novel
- Publication date: 2006
- Publication place: Chile
- ISBN: 978-987-566-452-4

Inés of My Soul (Spanish: Inés del alma mía, 2006) is a historical novel by the Chilean author, Isabel Allende. The novel consists of an elderly Inés Suárez writing a memoir of her own life. She narrates about her relationship with Pedro de Valdivia and the obstacles they had to overcome to conquer Chile and found the City of Santiago.

== Plot ==
This historical novel is about the main facts of the life of Inés (an important figure in Chile), written in older Ines' first-person voice, with its intended audience to be Ines' adoptive daughter, Isabel.

In the first chapter, "Europe, 1500-1537", she describes her life in Plasencia, Spain, mainly her married life and affair with Juan of Málaga, in addition to her hard trip to America, motivated not only to find her husband, but also to find freedom.

In "America, 1537-1540", she relates to us her life in The Cuzco, the decadence of the Incan empire under Francisco Pizarro and the political problems that they faced. Also, she begins her relationship with Pedro de Valdivia, who develops an obsession to conquer Chile, promoted by what was told to him by the old Diego of Almagro.

In the chapters of "Trip to Chile, 1540-1541" and "Santiago of the New Extremadura, 1541-1543" she talks about the hard conquest of Chile, the life with Pedro of Valdivia and how the two founded the capital of the country together.

"The Tragic Years, 1543-1549" deal with the poverty of the first years of Santiago as a city and her marriage with Rodrigo of Quiroga when Pedro of Valdivia goes back in an expedition to Peru, in search of more soldiers and settlers.

Finally, in the last chapter she describes the beginning of the War of Chile between Spaniards and Mapuches under the orders of Lautaro and Caupolicán.

== Dramatic structure ==
This work is based on documented, historical facts. But the author takes many liberties in depicting several historical facts, allowing her to add fictional twists. Allende lures the reader into the story with her rich and romantic language describing the book's universe.

== Characters ==
Allende shows Mrs. Inés as a woman with extreme courage, doing everything for the man she loves, but without shelving her purposes of honor and the anxieties to conquer new lands.

In the book, Isabel Allende gives the reader a glimpse of the hardships of the first conquistadores of the Realm of Chile and their constant mistreatment of the Mapuche people. She also describes the battles between the Mapuche and the Spaniards.

Other characters of the novel are Pedro of Valdivia, Rodrigo of Quiroga, Francisco of Aguirre, Juan of Málaga, Marina Ortiz of Gaete, Juan Gómez and his wife Cecilia, Catalina (a native servant and the best friend of the leading character) and Felipe (Lautaro), who at the beginning is a servant of Pedro of Valdivia but afterwards escapes with the Mapuche.

== Television series ==
On Friday, July 31, 2020, Amazon Prime Video premiered the television series Inés del alma mía, an adaptation of Isabel Allende's novel starring Elena Rivera and Eduardo Noriega.
