= Rodrigo de Quiroga =

Galician-Spanish conquistador general

Adelantado Rodrigo de Quiroga
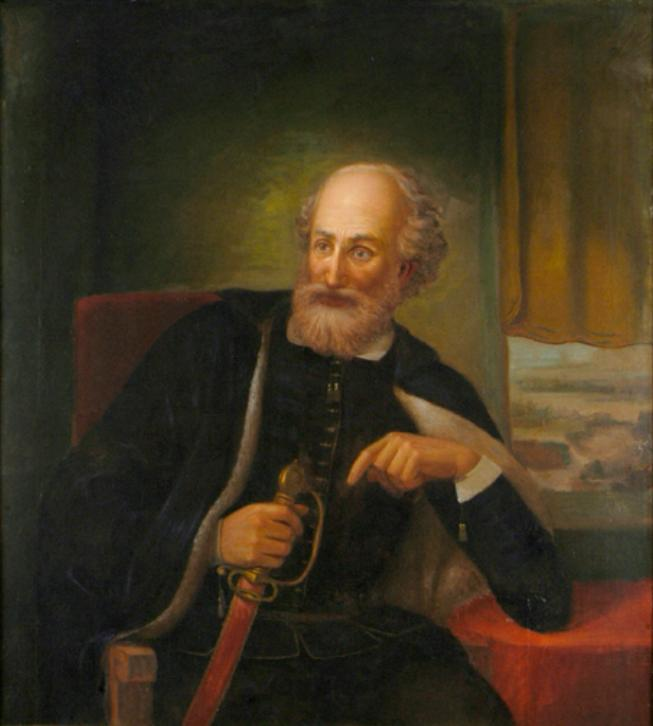

Royal Governor of Chile
- In office 1565–1567
- Monarch: Philip II
- Preceded by: Pedro de Villagra
- Succeeded by: Real Audiencia
- In office 1575–1580
- Monarch: Philip II
- Preceded by: Melchor Bravo de Saravia
- Succeeded by: Martín Ruiz de Gamboa

Personal details
- Born: c.1512 San Juan de Boime, Spain
- Died: February 20, 1580 (aged 67–68) Santiago, Chile
- Spouse: Inés de Suárez

Rodrigo de Quiroga López de Sober (c. 1512 – February 20, 1580) was a Spanish conquistador of Galician origin. He was twice the Royal Governor of Chile.

== Early life ==
He was the son of Hernado Camba de Quiroga and of María López de Sober. In the year 1535 he traveled to Peru and participated in the exploration of Gran Chaco in the expedition of Diego de Rojas. A year later, he accompanied a group led by the conquistador Francisco de Aguirre as they made their way to Chile. This group met up with Pedro de Valdivia in Atacama.

== In Chile ==
Quiroga participated in the military actions of the conquest of Chile, during the first part of the War of Arauco, coming to be one of the most important captains of the district. From 1548 he held a number of important posts in the administration in Santiago. Three times he was mayor, amongst other duties.

He married Inés de Suárez, the famous mistress of Pedro de Valdivia, when the Viceroy of Peru at the time ordered that Valdivia end the scandalous relationship or face excommunication.

At the death of Valdivia at the hands of the Mapuches at the Battle of Tucapel, the citizens of southern Chile followed the instructions of his will and announced Francisco de Villagra as their leader. However, in Santiago, the ruling cabildo ignored these recommendations and proclaimed Quiroga as governor. It was thus that there were for a time two governors in Chile: Villagra in the south and Quiroga in the north. The situation ended upon the return of Villagra from the southern war zone to reclaim his right to govern. The cabildo awarded him this right and obliged Quiroga to relinquish his power, which Quiroga grudgingly did.

In 1565, the Viceroy Lope García de Castro sent reinforcements from Peru under the command of general Jerónimo de Castilla. Castilla had orders to arrest Pedro de Villagra (the uncle of Francisco who had risen to the post of governor while protected by the previous Viceroy), and put Quiroga in his place. In these circumstances, Villagra saw that he was too weak to defend his title, so he ceded his power to Quiroga and went to Peru.

=== First government ===
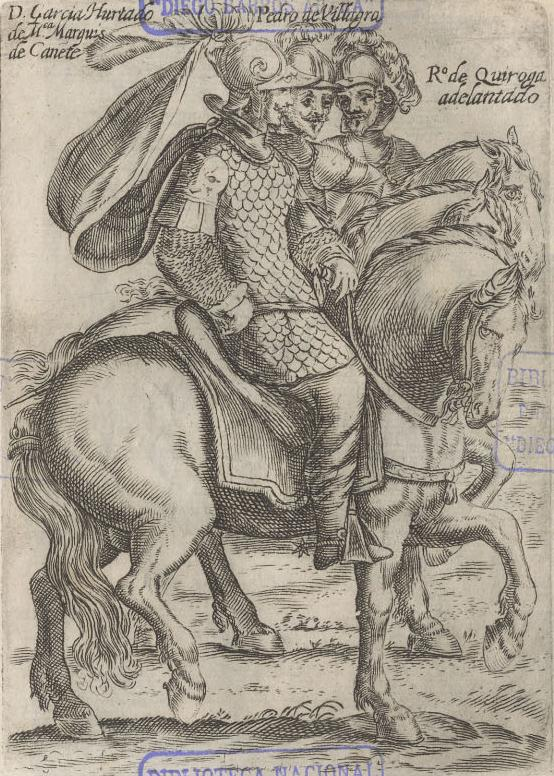
Alonso de Ovalle's 1646 engraving of García Hurtado de Mendoza, Pedro de Villagra and Rodrigo de Quiroga

This first government (not counting the earlier one, which was never imbued with real power) lasted until 1567. It was marked by constant clashes with the Indians, which often resulted in victories. Quiroga launched a new campaign, organized by Lorenzo Bernal del Mercado. He built forts at Lebu, Quiapo, reconstructed Cañete, and repopulated Arauco in 1566. He accomplished the conquest of the island of Chiloé, sending his Lieutenant Governor Martín Ruiz de Gamboa to establish the city of Castro there, and pacifying its inhabitants, the docile Cuncos.

Despite these triumphs, the court did not recognize his strengths, and upon returning to the capital, he found that the Real Audiencia of Chile had replaced him. For a while, he retreated from political life and dedicated himself to business.

=== Second government ===
In 1575, however, as a result of a dispute between the Real Audiencia and the governor at the time, Melchor Bravo de Saravia, he was called a second time to take charge of the Reino of Chile. He was sworn in that same year in front of the cabildo. Quiroga's second administration was more turbulent then the first. In addition to the ongoing war of Arauco, there were incursions by pirates, two earthquakes (in 1575) and a dispute with the bishop of San Miguel over the naming of ecclesiastical posts and the reduction of the income of the clerics, which put him in danger of excommunication.

Spain promised to send him 500 reinforcements to decisively end the war, but only 300 arrived. In addition, this smaller force was of much lesser quality than hoped and was almost completely without equipment. Overcoming these difficulties and his sickness (he had to be carried by chair to the battlefield), Quiroga launched a new offensive against the Mapuches, this time led by their toqui the mestizo Alonso Díaz.

The campaign had relative success, which allowed Quiroga to confront another menace, the appearance of Sir Francis Drake off the Chilean coasts. Drake managed to sack the port of Valparaíso, but when he tried to repeat the action at La Serena, he encountered the armed resistance of the inhabitants, and was repulsed.

=== Valdivia earthquake ===
On December 16, 1575 an earthquake struck southern Chile, and ruined the cities of La Imperial, Villarrica, Osorno, Castro, and specially the city of Valdivia, where the quake caused a landslide that plugged the drainage of Lake Riñihue. The water then accumulated until it eventually destroyed this natural dam, creating a secondary flood and disaster.

== Later life ==
Quiroga's grave sickness impeded him from continuing to direct the war, and he handed the task over to his son-in-law Martín Ruiz de Gamboa. Prostrated in his bed by his pain, in his last days he dedicated himself to religious observance, circled by monks to whose monasteries he would give a majority of his goods. He died quietly on February 25, 1580. His wife, Inés de Suárez, would die the same year.

== See also ==
- Arauco War
- Paineñamcu

== Sources ==
- Amunátegui, Miguel Luis (1913). Descubrimiento i conquista de Chile (PDF) (in Spanish). Santiago, Chile: Imprenta, Litografía i Encuadernación Barcelona. pp. 181–346.
- Cruz Farias, Eduardo (2002). "An overview of the Mapuche and Aztec military response to the Spanish Conquest".
- Ercilla, Alonso de. La Araucana (in Spanish). Eswikisource.
- Góngora Marmolejo, Alonso de (1960). Historia de Todas las Cosas que han Acaecido en el Reino de Chile y de los que lo han gobernado (1536–1575). Crónicas del Reino de Chile (in Spanish). Madrid, Spain: Atlas. pp. 75–224.
- Mariño de Lobera, Pedro (1960). Fr. Bartolomé de Escobar (ed.). Crónica del Reino de Chile, escrita por el capitán Pedro Mariño de Lobera... reducido a nuevo método y estilo por el Padre Bartolomé de Escobar (1593). Crónicas del Reino de Chile (in Spanish). Madrid, Spain: Atlas. pp. 227–562.
- Medina, José Toribio (1906). Diccionario Biográfico Colonial de Chile (PDF) (in Spanish). Santiago, Chile: Imprenta Elzeviriana.
- Valdivia, Pedro de (1960). Cartas. Crónicas del Reino de Chile (in Spanish). Madrid, Spain: Atlas. pp. 1–74.
- Vivar, Jerónimo de (1987). Crónica y relación copiosa y verdadera de los reinos de Chile (1558) (in Spanish). Madrid, Spain: ARTEHISTORIA REVISTA DIGITAL.
- "Rodrigo de Quiroga". Biografía de Chile (in Spanish).

Government offices
Preceded by Pedro de Villagra	Royal Governor of Chile; 1565–1567	Succeeded by Real Audiencia
Preceded by Melchor Bravo de Saravia	Royal Governor of Chile; 1575–1580	Succeeded by Martín Ruiz de Gamboa
