= 1575 Valdivia earthquake =

1575 earthquake centered in Valdivia, colonial Chile

- Location within South America
- Local date: December 16, 1575
- Local time: 14:30
- Magnitude: 8.5 M_{s} 9.0+ M_{w}
- Epicenter: 39.8°S 73.2°W
- Type: Megathrust
- Areas affected: Valdivia, Chile

The 1575 Valdivia earthquake occurred at 14:30 local time on December 16. It had an estimated magnitude of 8.5 of on the surface-wave magnitude scale and an estimated magnitude of 9.0+ on the Moment magnitude scale and led to the flood of Valdivia, Chile.

Pedro Mariño de Lobera, who was corregidor of Valdivia by that time, wrote that the waters of the river opened like the Red Sea, one part flowing upstream and one downstream. Mariño de Lobera also evacuated the city until the dam at Laguna de Anigua (nowadays Riñihue Lake) burst. At that moment he wrote that, while many Native people died, no Spaniards did, as the settlement of Valdivia was moved temporarily away from the riverside.

The effects of this earthquake are similar to the 1960 Valdivia earthquake, the largest ever recorded on earth, which also caused ensuing Riñihuazo flooding. These similarities show that large earthquakes have a pattern that span over several centuries.

== See also ==
- List of earthquakes in Chile
- List of historical earthquakes
