= Francisco de Villagra =

16th-century Royal Governor of Chile

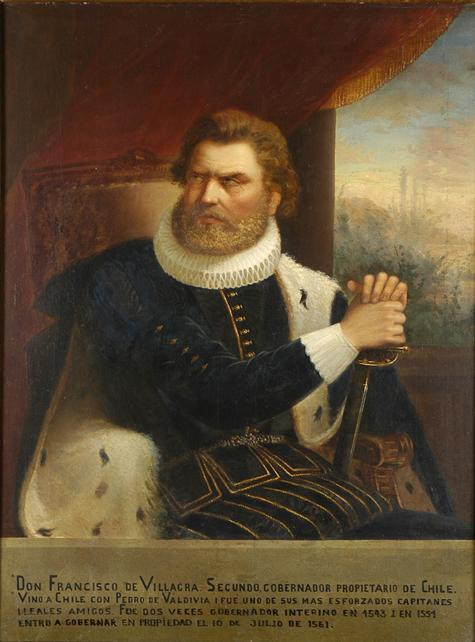

Royal Governor of Chile
- In office 1547–1549
- Monarch: Charles V
- Preceded by: Pedro de Valdivia
- Succeeded by: Pedro de Valdivia
- In office 1553–1557
- Monarchs: Charles V Philip II
- Preceded by: Pedro de Valdivia
- Succeeded by: García Hurtado de Mendoza
- In office 1561–1563
- Monarch: Philip II
- Preceded by: García Hurtado de Mendoza
- Succeeded by: Pedro de Villagra

Personal details
- Born: c. 1511 Santervás de Campos, Valladolid Province, Spain
- Died: 22 July 1563 Concepción, Chile
- Children: Pedro de Villagra, el mozo

Military service
- Allegiance: Spain
- Years of service: 1530s–1563
- Battles/wars: Conquest of Chile: Battle of Santiago; Battle of Marihueñu; Battle of Peteroa; Battle of Mataquito

Francisco de Villagra Velázquez (1511 – 22 July 1563) was a Spanish conquistador, and three times governor of Chile.

== Early life ==
Born at Santervás de Campos, he was the son of Alvaro de Sarría and Ana Velázquez de Villagra, who were not married. For this reason he took the name of his mother. Upon arrival in America, he went to Peru, where he planned with Captain Alonso de Mesa an attempt to free Diego de Almagro, then a prisoner of the Pizarro brothers. Discovered in this plot, he was condemned to death, but Hernándo Pizarro spared his life.

== Conquest of Chile ==
He traveled to Chile with Pedro de Valdivia and participated in the conquest of Chile. He was present at the foundation of Santiago in 1541, he occupied various positions in the government of the city, and he was called on to defend it from the assault of Michimalonco cacique in September of the same year.

=== First government ===
When Valdivia decided to travel to Peru in search of reinforcements in 1548, he made Villagra Lieutenant Governor of Chile. Soon after assuming his post he discovered a conspiracy directed by Pedro Sánchez de la Hoz, that already had tried to seize the government on previous occasions, but that Valdivia had pardoned because of his possible influence in court. Villagra was not so benevolent, and he was executed, without even giving him time to confess himself. This death caused problems for Valdivia, a judgment against him was made for various irregularities, but he overcame them, bringing in addition the designation of governor of Chile from the viceroy. In 1551 Villagra was sent to Peru to recruit the men necessary for further campaigns in the south against the Mapuches and returned to take part in them.

=== Second government ===
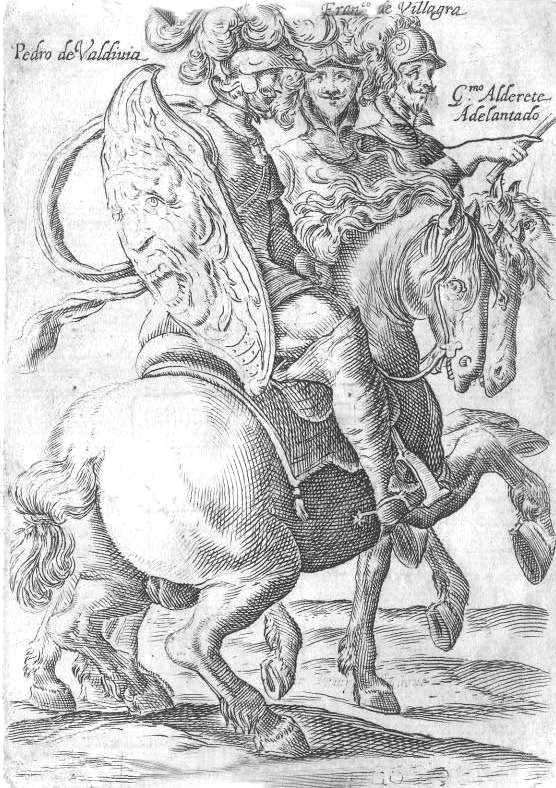
Alonso de Ovalle's 1646 engraving of Valdivia, Villagra and Alderete

Valdivia died in the Battle of Tucapel, on 25 December 1553. In his testament, that was only to be opened upon his death, he first named Jerónimo de Alderete governor of Chile, second choice was to be Francisco de Aguirre and lastly Villagra. Alderete was in Spain negotiating recognition of Valdivia's position with the king, and Aguirre was involved in the conquest of Tucumán. The cities of the south then proclaimed Villagra as governor. In Santiago where the testament of Valdivia was not opened and Rodrigo de Quiroga proclaimed himself governor. Villagra tried to stop the indigenous rebellion, led by Lautaro, but when facing him in the Battle of Marihueñu on 26 February he suffered a terrible defeat, having half of his soldiers killed and the remainder unable to prevent the destruction of Concepción. When he arrived in Santiago to recover the situation, he convinced Quiroga to leave his office.

When Aguirre received the news, he was in Tucumán, and Villagra had already been named governor, due to the death of Alderete and the absence of Aguirre. Apprised of the situation by his friends in La Serena, Aguirre immediately returned there, where he was welcomed as the Captain General, or Governor of Chile. He communicated this choice to Santiago, letting it be known that the troops under his command were prepared to maintain his position, which was his by right of Valdivia's will. The town council of Santiago, however, refused to acknowledge the declaration, disarming the contingent of troops under Aguirre's brother Hernando which had been sent to deliver it. The conflict was finally resolved when a petition was sent to the Audiencia in Lima, which determined that the council had to submit to the command for six months, after which the viceroy Andrés Hurtado de Mendoza would designate a new governor. If the term expired, Villagra would be the governor, in command of the army of the south. Aguirre wanted to ignore the verdict, but his forces were too small to match Villagra's if there was a confrontation, so he accepted it bitterly.

Meanwhile, the War of Arauco continued its course, and Lautaro returned to defeat the Spaniards in Angol and destroyed once again the newly restored Conception. Pedro de Villagra turned back Lautaro's march on Santiago at the Battle of Peteroa. The Governor then marched to the south, managed to reinforce the beleaguered cites there and then returned to surprise and defeat the Mapuches and kill Lautaro, in the Battle of Mataquito.

=== Exile in Lima ===
Soon after Villagra prevailed at Mataquito the new governor designated by the viceroy Andrés Hurtado de Mendoza, 3rd Marquis of Cañete arrived. This was his son Don García Hurtado de Mendoza. Among the first actions of the new governor, was to take both Aguirre and Villagra prisoners. Sent to Lima to be judged on his performance, the sentence was favorable to Villagra. This gained the confidence of many who saw in his arrest an act of abuse by the son of the viceroy.

== Last government and death ==
Years later, he was named by the King as the successor to Hurtado de Mendoza, and he took office in 1561. His government began with a terrible event, since the boat in which he came brought the smallpox to Chile. It appeared in a disastrous epidemic in Valparaíso and Santiago, but also affected with still greater severity the Mapuches that lost between twenty and twenty five percent of their population. When initiating his rule he reorganized the regulation of the work in the mines and annulled the encomiendas that Garcia Hurtado de Mendoza had given to his friends and companions, which began new protests against him. He organized a new expedition against the Mapuche, but his body tired of so many battles fell irremediably ill. He had to be transferred in a stretcher to the battle sites. He also suffered in addition the death of his son Pedro de Villagra, el mozo in this war, which made his mental and physical condition worse. He later designated his cousin Pedro de Villagra to continue the campaign, giving him also the title of temporary governor, thanks to a power given him by the viceroy.

He died at Concepción two days later, on 22 July 1563, and according to his desire, was buried with the Franciscan habit.

== See also ==
- Pedro de Valdivia
- Jerónimo de Alderete
- Francisco de Aguirre
- Arauco War

=== Sources ===
- Ercilla, Alonso de. La Araucana (in Spanish). Eswikisource.
- Góngora Marmolejo, Alonso de (1960). Historia de Todas las Cosas que han Acaecido en el Reino de Chile y de los que lo han gobernado (1536–1575). Crónicas del Reino de Chile (in Spanish). Madrid, Spain: Atlas. pp. 75–224.
- Mariño de Lobera, Pedro (1960). Fr. Bartolomé de Escobar (ed.). Crónica del Reino de Chile, escrita por el capitán Pedro Mariño de Lobera... reducido a nuevo método y estilo por el Padre Bartolomé de Escobar (1593). Crónicas del Reino de Chile (in Spanish). Madrid, Spain: Atlas. pp. 227–562.
- Valdivia, Pedro de (1960). Cartas. Crónicas del Reino de Chile (in Spanish). Madrid, Spain: Atlas. pp. 1–74.
- Vivar, Jerónimo de (1987). Crónica y relación copiosa y verdadera de los reinos de Chile (1558) (in Spanish). Madrid, Spain: ARTEHISTORIA REVISTA DIGITAL.

Government offices
| Preceded by Pedro de Valdivia | Royal Governor of Chile; 1547–1549 | Succeeded by Pedro de Valdivia |
| Preceded by Pedro de Valdivia | Royal Governor of Chile; 1553–1555, 1556–1557 | Succeeded by García Hurtado de Mendoza |
| Preceded by García Hurtado de Mendoza | Royal Governor of Chile; 1561–1563 | Succeeded by Pedro de Villagra |
