= Battle of Tucapel =

1553 battle in Chile

- Part of the Arauco War
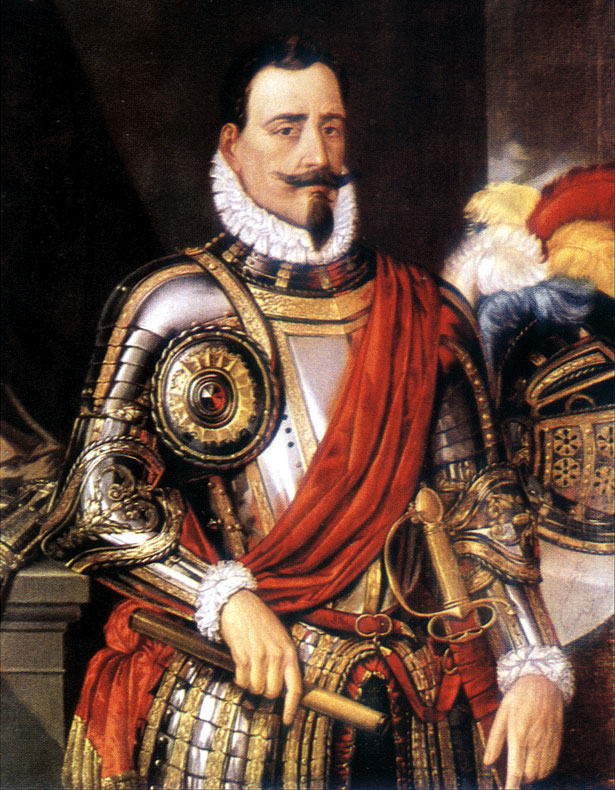
- Spanish commander Pedro de Valdivia
Date	December 25, 1553
Location	Near Fort Tucapel (in present-day Cañete, Chile) 37°47′46.0″S 73°24′3.0″W
Result	Mapuche victory

Belligerents
Spanish Empire	Mapuches

Commanders and leaders
Pedro de Valdivia (executed)	Caupolicán; Lautaro

Strength
55 Spanish soldiers 2,000–5,000 yanakuna	More than 50,000 warriors according to Spanish sources, considered exaggerated; modern estimations give 10,000

Casualties and losses
All 55 Spaniards killed, most of the yanakuna killed	Unknown but not small
- Location of Fort Tucapel

The Battle of Tucapel (also known as the Disaster of Tucapel) is the name given to a battle fought between Spanish conquistador forces led by Pedro de Valdivia and Mapuche (Araucanian) Indians under Lautaro that took place at Tucapel, Chile on December 25, 1553. The battle occurred in the context of the first stage of the Arauco War, named the "offensive war" within a larger uprising by Araucanians against the Spanish conquest of Chile. It was a defeat for the Spaniards, resulting in the capture and eventual death of Valdivia.

== Background ==
The Arauco War was a large scale war that took place in what is now Chilean territory between Spanish conquerors and Mapuches. Pedro de Valdivia was a Spanish conquistador who founded the first permanent Spanish settlements in what is now Chilean territory, including Santiago. Around 1550, he captured a Mapuche man who then served as a stable hand; de Valdivia baptized him as Felipe Lautaro. During this period, Lautaro learned horse-riding and Spanish military techniques that he would use later in the ongoing conflict; upon his escape from Spanish Chile, he fled South toward the Araucunians. At the same time, Pedro de Valdivia and the Spanish established forts and settlements such as Tucapel and Purén, dispersing forces in the occupied territory in an effort to pacify the South.

De Valdivia went on an inspection tour of a group of forts constructed to secure the Chilean interior for the Spanish. He left Concepción in December 1553 and worked his way south to Quilacoya, where he gathered troops for the march into the restive territory of Arauco. Mapuche spies observed his column from the hills, following and not presenting themselves for battle. Meanwhile, Lautaro kept a force led by Gómez de Almagro bottled up in the nearby fort of Purén. He learned through his spies of the southward movement of de Valdivia, and judged that his force would probably pass through the fort of Tucapel.

De Valdivia became perturbed by the lack of news from Tucapel and by the lack of hostility on the road. On December 24, he decided that he would make for the fort, hoping to find Almagro and his troops there. The tranquility and the occasional sightings of Indians in the distance continued to raise his suspicion, and he sent an scouting team of five men under the command of Luis de Bobadilla to explore the road ahead and return with information about the location of the enemy.

== Battle ==
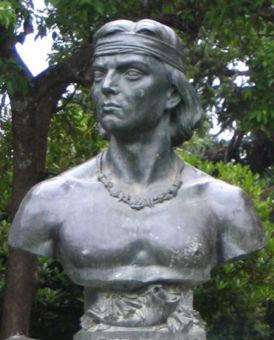
Bust of Lautaro in the square of Cañete.

Tucapel fort was located on a hill in the coastal mountain range. In December 1553, Mapuche forces, under the command of the vice toqui Lautaro attacked and destroyed the fort using the battle tactics learned from the Spanish. Pedro de Valdivia had left Concepción with only 50 soldiers and sent a message to Purén fort to send reinforcements. The message, however, was intercepted by Lautaro's men.

De Valdivia received no reports from his leading element, and spent the night a half day's journey from Tucapel. On Christmas Day, December 25, 1553, he left early in the morning for the fort, arriving in its vicinity with silence reigning. He found it completely destroyed. Neither Gómez de Almagro nor Bobadilla was anywhere to be found. He decided to make camp amidst the damp ruins of the fort, but the contingent had hardly begun to make preparations when there were shouts from the surrounding forest. Without advance warning, a mass of Mapuche warriors charged out towards the Spanish enclave.

A veteran soldier, de Valdivia had time to form and arm his defensive line and repulsed the first attack. The cavalry charged upon the rearguard of the retreating Mapuche force, but the Indians were prepared for this action and reversed the charge with lances. However, with much valor and resolution the Spaniards managed to drive back the resulting Mapuche surge into the forest. The Spaniards savored their temporary victory.

There was still more to come, however. A second squadron of Mapuches attacked, this time armed with maces and ropes as well as lances, with which they succeeded in dismounting the unfortunate Spanish caballeros, whom they quickly dragged out of the battlefield once they were on the ground. The Spanish managed to drive them back, but not without leaving many fallen. Then a third group of Mapuches appeared, this time with Lautaro behind it.

De Valdivia, aware of the desperate situation due to the Spanish losses and fatigue, gathered together his available men and threw himself into the bitter fight. Already half of the Spanish forces were casualties and the Indian auxiliaries were steadily being reduced. De Valdivia, seeing that the fight was lost, ordered the retreat, but Lautaro himself came around the flank and sealed the Spanish fate. The Indians felled every one of the Spaniards, and only de Valdivia and the cleric Pozo, who rode the best horses, were able to escape. However, when crossing the swamps the men became bogged down and the Mapuches eventually captured them.

== De Valdivia's death ==
According to Jerónimo de Vivar, the toqui Caupolicán personally ordered the execution of de Valdivia, who was killed with a lance and his head, along with those of the two other bravest Spaniards, were put on display. Alonso de Góngora Marmolejo writes de Valdivia offered as a ransom for his life that he would evacuate the Spanish settlements in their lands and give them large herds of animals, but this was rejected and the Mapuche cut off his forearms, roasted and ate them in front of him before killing him and the priest. Pedro Mariño de Lobera wrote that de Valdivia offered to evacuate the lands of the Mapuche but says he was shortly after killed by a vengeful warrior named Pilmaiquen with a large club, saying de Valdivia could not be trusted to keep his word once freed. Lobera also mentioned that a common story in Chile at the time was that de Valdivia was killed by giving him the gold that the Spaniards so desired; however, the gold was molten and was poured down de Valdivia's throat. According to a later legend, Lautaro took de Valdivia to the Mapuche camp and put him to death after three days of torture, extracting his beating heart and eating it with the Mapuche leaders.

Following the battle Caupolicán went on to blockade the city of Valdivia and the few remaining Spanish settlements in the south of Chile. Lautaro watched the Spanish forces in Concepción, the center of the Spanish power in southern Chile. The Spanish turned into disarray as the succession of the governorship was for a while in dispute between three men.

== See also ==
- List of battles won by Indigenous peoples of the Americas
- History of Chile
- Arauco War
- Pedro de Valdivia
- Lautaro
