= Alonso de Góngora Marmolejo =

Alonso de Góngora Marmolejo (1523–1575) was a Spanish conquistador and chronicler of the early conquest and settlement of the Captaincy General of Chile, and the start of the Arauco War.

== Biography ==
Marmolejo was born in the town of Carmona, Andalucía, in 1523. He was the son of the regidor of the town, Juan Jiménez de Góngora Marmolejo and of Teresa Núñez de Tanfarva. In April 1551 he came as a soldier to Santiago, Chile and shortly after was transferred to Concepción to join the expedition that Pedro de Valdivia had prepared to continue his southern conquests. He attended the foundation of Valdivia, where he lived and was regidor in 1555.

In 1557 he was transferred from Valdivia by sea to serve Don García Hurtado de Mendoza who had just arrived as new Governor and was on Quiriquina Island. Góngora participated in the campaign there and later was part of the garrison of the fort of Tucapel and helped frustrate Caupolicán's attack on the fort that resulted in his being captured and executed. Don Garcia made him an encomendero of Cañete and there he was also regidor in 1558 and 1559.

He was in Santiago, in June 1561, when Francisco de Villagra took provisional control of the government and it is probable that he accompanied Villagra in his southern campaigns. Prevailed on by Pedro de Villagra, he returned to Valdivia where he carried out the position of Royal official. In 1571 he was corregidor of Villarrica. In 1575 Rodrigo de Quiroga named him judge investigator of the indigenous wizards, but by the end of that year he had died.

Góngora Marmolejo was the author of History of All the Things that Have happened in the Kingdom of Chile and of those who had governed it (Spanish: Historia de Todas las Cosas que han Acaecido en el Reino de Chile y de los que lo han gobernado) which roughly covers the period between the first Spanish incursions into the territory of Chile and the time of his own death (1536–1575). Góngora Marmolejo was many times an eyewitness of the events he chronicles or wrote about them based on the reports of others who had been present at the events from that time. His history tried to maintain an even-handed vision and has been considered by historians of the period as one of the better sources. Its text is interesting as the work of a soldier who in spite of being a man of culture, used a direct and simple style, and is believed to have been inspired by the publication of Alonso de Ercilla's "La Araucana".

== Additional information ==
=== See also ===
- History of Chile
- Pedro de Valdivia
- García Hurtado de Mendoza
- Jerónimo de Vivar
- Pedro Mariño de Lobera
- Alonso de Ercilla
- Arauco War
- Mapuche people

=== Bibliography ===
- Góngora Marmolejo, Alonso de (1960). Historia de Todas las Cosas que han Acaecido en el Reino de Chile y de los que lo han gobernado (1536–1575). Crónicas del Reino de Chile (in Spanish). Madrid, Spain: Atlas. pp. 75–224.

=== Sources ===
- Invernizzi Santa Cruz, Lucía. "La historia de Góngora Marmolejo, uno de los relatos de la conquista de Chile". Fuentes Documentales y Bibliográficas para el estudio de la Historia de Chile. Universidad de Chile.
- Medina, José Toribio (1906). Diccionario Biográfico Colonial de Chile (PDF) (in Spanish). Santiago, Chile: Imprenta Elzeviriana. pp. 368–369.
