= Pedro Mariño de Lobera =

16th-century Spanish conquistador and colonial official in Chile (1528–1594)

Pedro Mariño de Lobera (1528–1594) was a Galician soldier, conquistador, and chronicler of the Arauco War in the Captaincy General of Chile.

== Biography ==
Pedro was a professional soldier who served in the war between Spain and France, and ended up going to the Americas in 1545. He joined the forces of Pedro de La Gasca in Havana, Cuba, when he received the order of King Carlos V to end the revolt of Gonzalo Pizarro in Peru. He was then transferred to Lima where he remained, until his trip to Chile, in 1551.

In Chile, he participated actively next to Pedro de Valdivia and Francisco de Villagra in the first campaigns made to the South, as an outstanding soldier. Also, he was present in the campaigns of the governors García Hurtado de Mendoza and Rodrigo de Quiroga.

Later, in payment of his services, an encomienda in the city of Valdivia was granted to him. He was the corregidor of the city, rendering his aid to the victims of the flood caused by the 1575 Valdivia earthquake. Later he was also corregidor of Camaná, in the south coast of Peru, returning later to Lima.

In his last years, Mariño de Lobera developed a friendship with the Jesuit Fr. Bartolomé de Escobar, who also had been in Chile, giving him the manuscripts of his Chronicle of the Kingdom of Chile (Spanish: Crónica del Reino de Chile) to be corrected and published by the priest. Even though Fr. Escobar edited the manuscript, the text was never printed at the time. Only in 1865 was it published in the Volume VI of the Colección de Historiadores de Chile y documentos relativos a la Historia Nacional de ese país. Mariño de Lobera died in Lima in 1594.

== Additional information ==
=== See also ===
- History of Chile
- Pedro de Valdivia
- García Hurtado de Mendoza
- Francisco de Villagra
- Alonso de Góngora Marmolejo
- Jerónimo de Vivar
- Alonso de Ercilla
- Arauco War
- Mapuche people

=== Bibliography ===
- Mariño de Lobera, Pedro (1960). Fr. Bartolomé de Escobar (ed.). Crónica del Reino de Chile, escrita por el capitán Pedro Mariño de Lobera... reducido a nuevo método y estilo por el Padre Bartolomé de Escobar (1593). Crónicas del Reino de Chile (in Spanish). Madrid, Spain: Atlas. pp. 227–562.

=== Sources ===
- Invernizzi Santa Cruz, Lucía. "La historia de Góngora Marmolejo, uno de los relatos de la conquista de Chile". Fuentes Documentales y Bibliográficas para el estudio de la Historia de Chile. Universidad de Chile.
- Medina, José Toribio (1906). Diccionario Biográfico Colonial de Chile (PDF) (in Spanish). Santiago, Chile: Imprenta Elzeviriana. pp. 503–506.
