= Pedro de Valdivia =

Spanish conquistador (1497–1553)

Adelantado Pedro De Valdivia
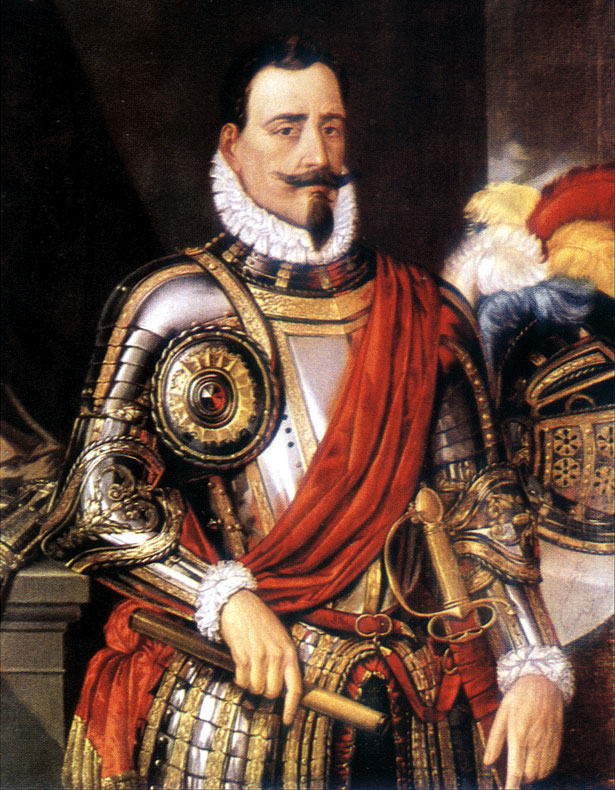
- Posthumous portrait by Federico de Madrazo

1st and 3rd Royal Governor of Chile
- In office June 10, 1540 – December 1547
- Monarch: Charles I of Spain
- Preceded by: Office established
- Succeeded by: Francisco de Villagra
- In office July 20, 1549 – December 25, 1553
- Monarch: Charles I of Spain
- Prime Minister: Pedro de la Gasca
- Preceded by: Francisco de Villagra
- Succeeded by: Francisco de Villagra

2nd Adelantado of Terra Australis
- In office August 2, 1540 – December 25, 1553
- Monarch: Charles I of Spain
- Preceded by: Pedro Sancho de la Hoz
- Succeeded by: Jerónimo de Alderete

Personal details
- Born: April 17, 1497 Villanueva de la Serena, Extremadura, Spain
- Died: December 25, 1553 (aged 56) near Fort Tucapel, Chile
- Spouse: Marina Ortíz de Gaete

Military service
- Allegiance: Spain
- Years of service: 1520–1553
- Rank: Captain General
- Battles/wars: Comuneros Revolt; Italian Wars; Battle of Pavia; Sack of Rome; Colonization of Venezuela; Conquest of Peru; Battle of Las Salinas; Battle of Xaquixahuana; Arauco War; Battle of Quilacura; Battle of Andalien; Battle of Penco; Battle of Tucapel (executed)

Pedro Gutiérrez de Valdivia or Valdiva (Spanish pronunciation: [ˈpeðɾo ðe βalˈdiβja]; April 17, 1497 – December 25, 1553) was a Spanish conquistador and the first Governor of Colonial Chile. After having served with the Spanish army in Italy and Flanders, he was sent to South America in 1535, where he served as a soldier under the Pizarro brothers in Peru, gradually rising in power.

In 1540, Valdivia led an expedition of 150 Spaniards and 1,000 Peruvian Indians into Chile, where he defeated a large force of indigenous warriors and founded Santiago in 1541. He extended Spanish rule south to the Biobío River in 1546, fought again in Peru (1546–1548), and returned to Chile as Royal Governor in 1549. In 1550, he expanded Spanish rule further south into Araucanía, where he founded the city of Concepción and the eponymous city of Valdivia. He was captured and killed by Mapuche Indians during the Arauco War in 1553.

== Early life as soldier in Europe and arrival in the Americas ==
Pedro de Valdivia is believed to have been born in Villanueva de la Serena (some say Castuera) in Extremadura, Spain, around 1500 (some sources put his date of birth as early as 1497 or as late as 1505) to an impoverished hidalgo family. In 1520 a civil war broke out in Castile, the Revolt of the Comuneros, and Valdivia joined the royalist army of King Charles I. He later fought in Flanders in 1521 and Italy between 1522 and 1527, participating in the Battle of Pavia as part of the troops of the Marquis of Pescara. In May 1527, Valdivia was involved in the sack of Rome as a member of Charles I's mutinous mercenary army.

Valdivia sailed with a Spanish military force to South America in 1535. He first arrived in present-day Venezuela and stayed there for one year. During his time there, he likely fought against the Carib Indians, who were known for being warlike.

Valdivia traveled south to Peru in 1537. During this time, there was a civil war between the Spanish colonists in Peru, with one faction led by Francisco Pizarro and the other faction led by Diego de Almagro. Valdivia sided with Pizarro's faction and helped them defeat Almagro at the Battle of Las Salinas in 1538. Afterwards, Valdivia accompanied Hernando and Gonzalo Pizarro on an expedition to conquer High Peru (later known as Bolivia). As a reward for helping the Pizarro brothers, Valdivia was given an encomienda property with a silver mine in Potosí. This large silver mine that Valdivia owned made him a very rich man.

Valdivia had married Marina Ortíz de Gaete in Spain. In Peru he became attached to Inés de Suárez, a Spanish widow who accompanied him to Chile as his mistress.

== Expedition to Chile ==
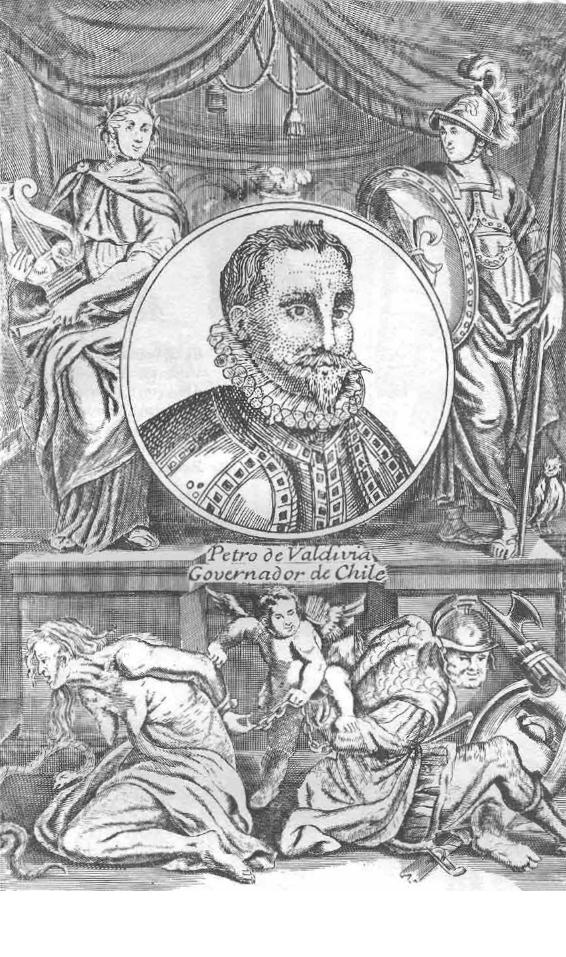
Alonso de Ovalle's 1646 engraving of Pedro de Valdivia.

After the failure of the expedition of Diego de Almagro in 1536, the lands to the south of Peru (then known as Nueva Toledo, extending from the 14° — close to modern day Pisco, Peru — to the 25° latitude — close to Taltal, Chile) had remained unexplored. Valdivia asked Governor Francisco Pizarro for permission to conquer and govern that territory. He got his permission but was appointed as Lieutenant Governor, rather than Governor as he had wanted.

The expedition was fraught with problems from the beginning. Valdivia had to sell the lands and the mine that had been assigned to him in order to finance the expedition. A shortage of soldiers and adventurers was also problematic; the men were not interested in conquering what they believed were extremely poor lands. While Valdivia was preparing the expedition, Pedro Sánchez de la Hoz arrived from Spain with a royal grant for the same territory. To avoid difficulties, Pizarro advised the two competitors to join their interests, and on December 28, 1539, they signed a contract of partnership.

Valdivia's expedition finally left Cuzco, Peru in January 1540, with Pizarro's permission and Pedro Sancho de Hoz as partner. They carried a plethora of seeds for planting, a herd of pigs, and some brood mares. The expedition was composed of 1,000 Peruvian Indian auxiliaries, 150 Spaniards, and a few African slaves. A Spanish woman was among the travelers, Inés de Suárez, Valdivia's mistress. En route more Spaniards joined the expedition, attracted by Valdivia's fame as a brilliant leader.

Valdivia resolved to avoid the road over the Andes, which had proved fatal to Almagro's army, and set out resolutely through the Atacama Desert. On the way, Sancho de Hoz, seeking sole leadership, tried to murder Valdivia but failed. He was pardoned, but from then on had to accept subordinate status. The natives of the region were not pleased by the return of the Spaniards due to the maltreatment they had suffered under Almagro. With many promises, Valdivia was able to regain their trust. After a march of five months, and suffering great privations, the expedition arrived at the Copiapo valley. Valdivia officially took possession of the land in the name of the Spanish king.

Soon thereafter they continued south and in December 1540, eleven months after they left Cuzco, Valdivia and his expedition reached the valley of the Mapocho river, where they established the capital of the territory. The valley was extensive and well populated with natives. Its soil was fertile and there was abundant fresh water. Two high hills provided defensive positions. Soon after their arrival, Valdivia tried to convince the native inhabitants of his good intentions, sending out delegations bearing gifts for the caciques.

Finally on February 12, 1541, Valdivia officially founded the city of Santiago de la Nueva Extremadura (named after Saint James, Santiago in Spanish, and Valdivia's home region of Extremadura, Spain). The ceremony was held at the foot of the Huelén hill (now known as Santa Lucia hill).

After arriving in Chile, Valdivia and his men worked to restore a positive relationship between the conquistadores and Indians, which had been greatly harmed by Almagro and his merciless ways. At first, Valdivia was successful in his efforts, but this peaceful coexistence did not last long. One of the first orders that Valdivia gave was to have a ship constructed at the mouth of the Aconcagua River to send to Peru for further supplies and to serve as a courier service. He then had to return in haste to Santiago to subdue a mutiny. The Spaniards' greed surfaced and overshadowed previous intentions when rumors of gold arose at the Marga Marga mines, in the vicinity of Valparaiso. The Spanish imposed slavery on the indigenous population to profit from the mines.

== Colonization of Chile ==
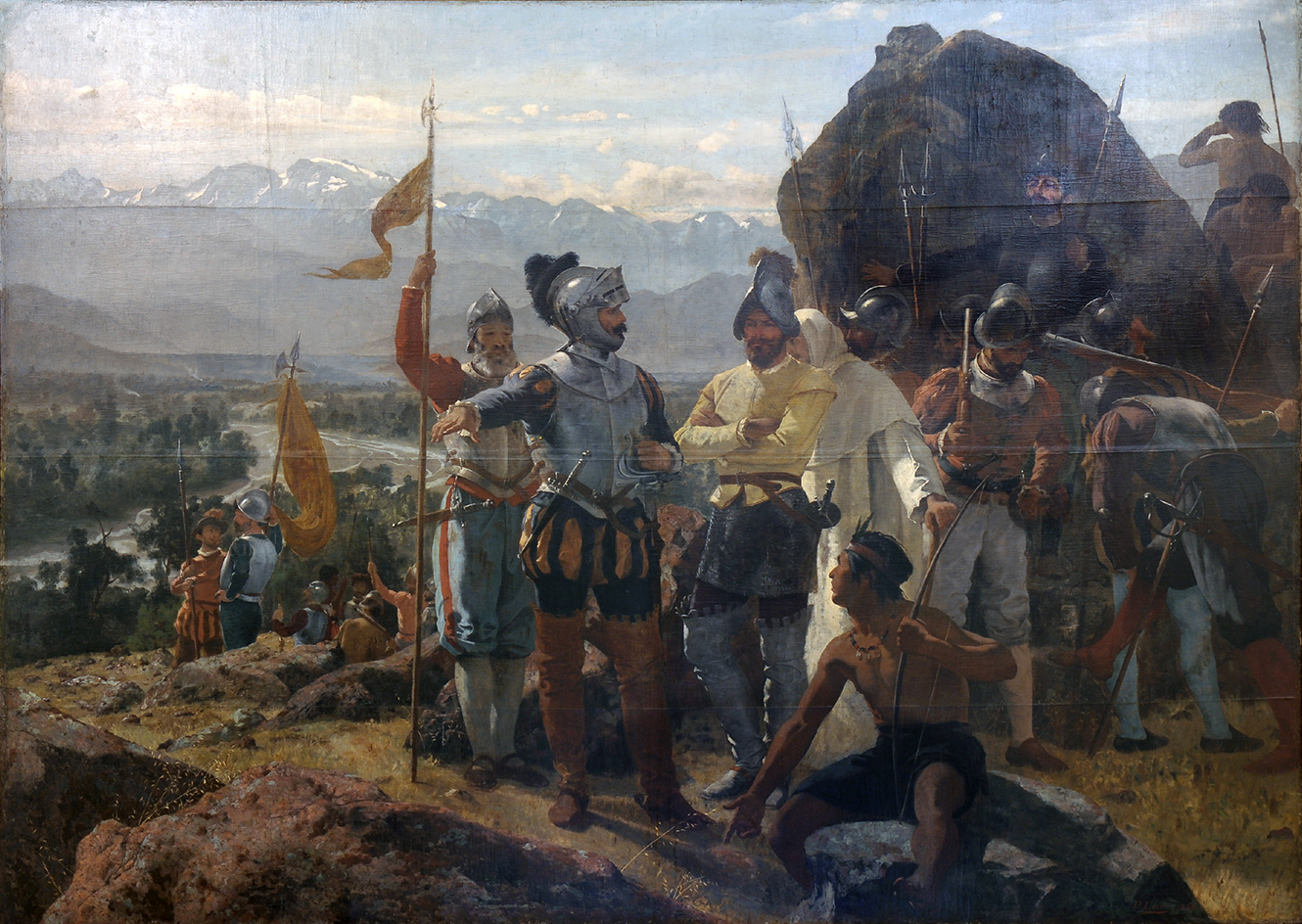
Pedro Lira's 1789 painting of the founding of Santiago by Pedro de Valdivia at Huelén Hill.

On learning of Francisco Pizarro's murder in 1541, Valdivia had himself appointed governor of the territory by the council of the new city, and removed Chile from Peruvian control, acknowledging only the royal authority, an arrangement the Crown found acceptable. Secure now in his own domain, he pushed exploration southward and aided the development of the country by dividing the land among his ablest followers and parceling out the Indians in encomiendas. Chile possessed minerals, but Valdivia definitely subordinated mining to agriculture and stock raising. Still, the colony was not prosperous; gold was scarce and the Araucanians warlike.

=== Destruction of Santiago ===
After an apparent peaceful period the Natives began to resist the invaders. Valdivia marched against the tribes and defeated them at Cachapoal. While away, on September 11, 1541, local people led by Michimalonco attacked Santiago. The defense of the city was led by Pedro's mistress Inés de Suárez. The Spaniards, desperate and willing to fight until death, were able to eventually push the Natives back; Valdivia and his troops made it back just in time to relieve the capital.

By the time the battle ended the entire town had been destroyed and burned to the ground, animals were killed and the fields and stores were decimated. Only a small amount of property was not destroyed, including a handful of seeds, two sows, one pig and a pair of chickens. Valdivia organized his men into groups to keep watch over the crops and protect the city against attack. For the next two years, there were men always saddled and armed, ready to fight in case the Natives posed a threat to Spanish authority.

This event meant a real setback for the conquest of the Chilean territory. The resistance of the Native people became stronger daily, and as the ship that he had constructed in Aconcagua was also destroyed by the natives, Valdivia sent in 1542 overland to Peru his lieutenant Alonso de Monroy with five followers to seek reinforcements, but, on account of the disturbance in that country in consequence of the defeat of El Mozo Almagro by Cristóbal Vaca de Castro, Monroy could not obtain much aid, and returned in September 1543, with only seventy horsemen, also sending by sea a vessel with provisions and ammunition to the port of Aconcagua.

== Expanding the colony ==
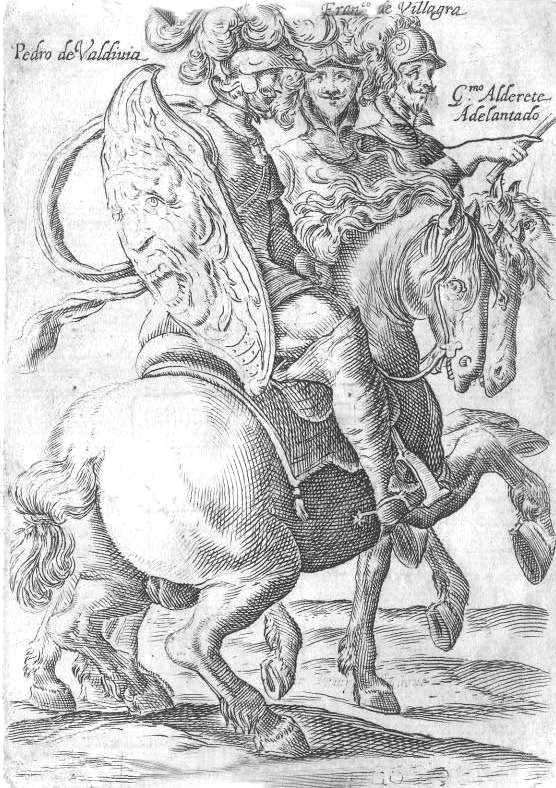
Alonso de Ovalle's 1646 engraving of Valdivia, Villagra and Alderete.

In September 1543 new arms, clothes and other equipment arrived from Peru on the ship Santiaguillo; thanks to these new supplies, Valdivia was in the position to start the rebuilding of Santiago and to send an expedition, led by Juan Bohón, to explore and populate the northern region of Chile. This expedition founded La Serena halfway between Santiago and the northern Atacama Desert, in the valley of Coquimbo. Valparaíso, though used as a port by the Spaniards from the start, had no considerable population until much later.

In 1544 Valdivia sent a naval expedition consisting of the barks San Pedro and Santiaguillo, under the command of Juan Bautista Pastene, to reconnoiter the southwestern coast of South America, ordering him to reach the Strait of Magellan. The expedition set sail from Valparaíso and although Pastene did not reach this goal, he explored much of the coast. He entered the bay of San Pedro, and made landings at what are now known as Concepción and at Valdivia, which was later named in honor of the commander. Encountering severe storms further south, he then returned to Valparaiso.

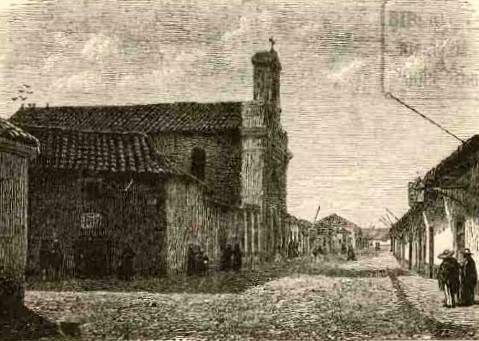
House of Pedro de Valdivia in Santiago de Chile, along with the Vera Cruz capel, as pictured by Recaredo Santos Tornero in Chile Ilustrado (1872).

In February 1546 Valdivia himself set out, with sixty horsemen plus native guides and porters, and crossed the Itata River. He arrived as far as the Bío-Bío River where he intended to further efforts at colonization by founding another town. However, Mapuche warriors defended their territory at the Battle of Quilacura. Realizing that it would be impossible to proceed in such hostile territory with so limited a force, Valdivia wisely elected to return to Santiago shortly thereafter, after finding a site for a new city at what is now Penco and would become the first site of Concepción. Still, Valdivia managed to subdue the country between Santiago and the Maule River.

=== Return to Peru ===
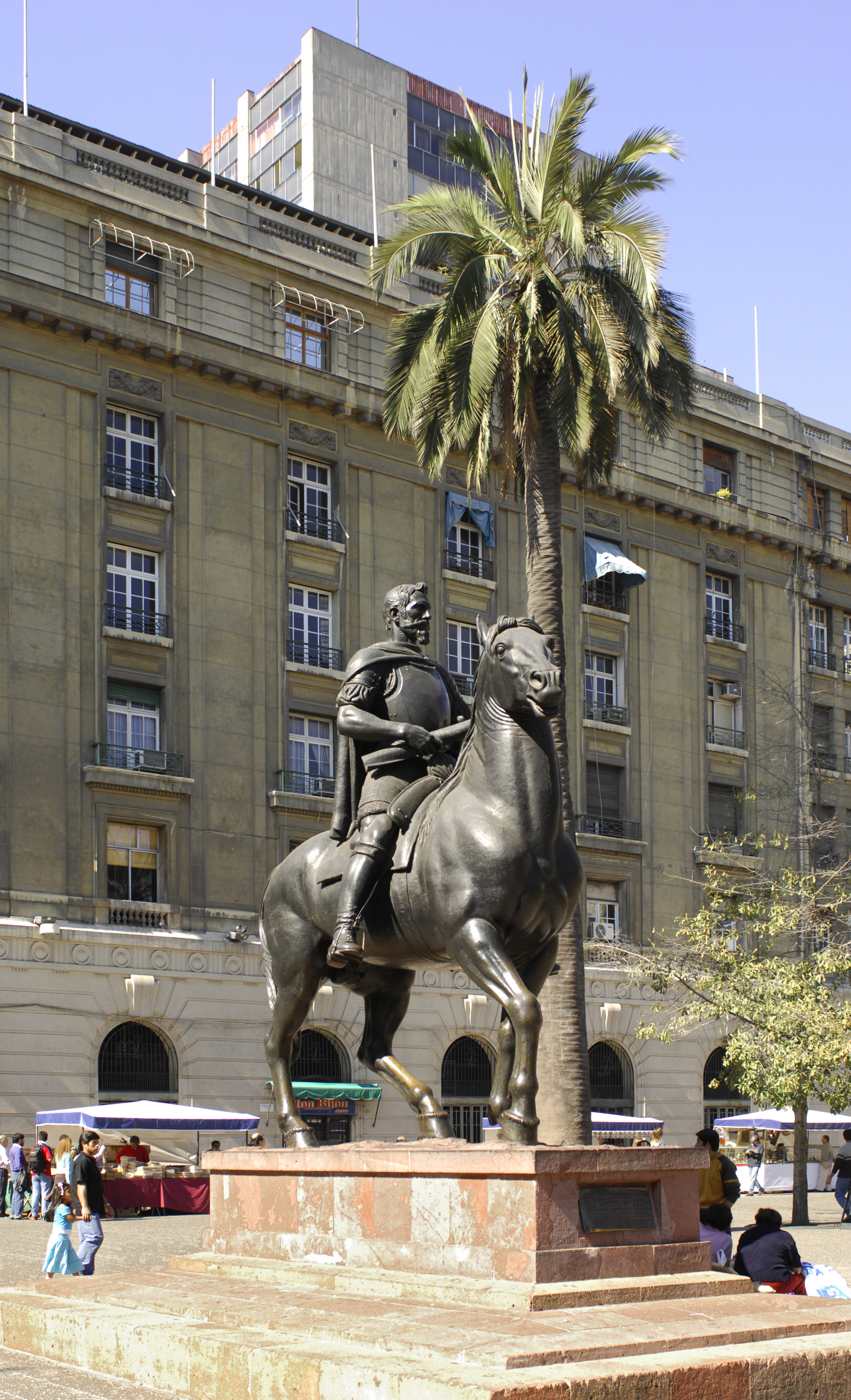
Statue of Pedro de Valdivia (Santiago, Chile)

To secure additional aid and confirm his claims to the conquered territory, Valdivia returned in 1547 to Peru, leaving Francisco de Villagra as governor in his stead. There he tried to gather more resources and men to continue the conquest. When the Gonzalo Pizarro rebellion began in Peru, the insurgents attempted unsuccessfully to win Valdivia to their side. Nonetheless, early in 1548 Valdivia joined the royal army of Viceroy Pedro de la Gasca, and his military experience counted heavily in the victory of Xaquixahuana on April 9 of that year. In the battle, Valdivia met Francisco de Carvajal, who just like him had also fought in the Italian Wars, been at the Sack of Rome and helped to defeat Diego de Almagro.

Nonetheless, a discontented faction from Chile managed to have him tried in Lima, accused of tyranny, malfeasance of public funds and public immorality. One of the charges levelled against him was that he, being married, openly lived with Inés de Suárez "...in the manner of man and wife and they sleep in one bed and they eat in one dish...". In exchange for being freed, and for his confirmation as Royal Governor, he agreed to relinquish her and to bring to Chile his wife, Marina Ortíz de Gaete, who only arrived after Valdivia's death in 1554. He was also ordered to marry Inés off, which he did, upon his return to Chile in 1549, to one of his captains, Rodrigo de Quiroga. As recognition for his services Valdivia was finally appointed as adelantado and won the royal assent to his coveted title of Governor of Chile, returning to the settlement with his position and prestige considerably strengthened.

== Arauco War ==
Between 1549 and 1553, after his return to Santiago, Valdivia began to expand Spanish rule south of the Biobío River into Araucanía, but faced heavy resistance from the indigenous population. Valdivia had clashed with the Mapuche Indians and defeated them in several battles, but he was never able to permanently subdue them as they were determined to not surrender . In spite of the fierce resistance at the Battle of Penco, he founded Concepción on October 5, 1550. Later he founded more southern settlements such as La Imperial, Valdivia, Angol and Villarrica, in 1551 and 1552.

=== The 1553 uprising and the Battle of Tucapel ===
After a brief stay in Santiago, Valdivia returned to the south again in December 1552. To keep the route open between Concepción and the southern settlements, Valdivia built a number of forts in the Nahuelbuta Mountains. He moved against the Mapuche Indians again in 1553 and built a fort at Tucapel. By the advice of the cacique Colocolo, the Mapuches united their efforts choosing as Toqui (general-in-chief) the famous warrior Caupolicán.

Valdivia's soldiers had earlier captured Lautaro, a Mapuche youth who became his page. Valdivia taught the use of European military tactics and weapons to Lautaro, as he hoped Lautaro would serve as an Indian auxiliary. Lautaro secretly remained loyal to his own people and rejoined them to show Caupolicán a plan by which Valdivia could be defeated. Toward the end of 1553, the Mapuches under Lautaro revolted and attacked the over-extended Spanish forces in the south. One of the first actions of the rebellion was the attack on the fort at Tucapel, where they managed to destroy the fort on December 2, 1553. Valdivia was at Concepcion when he was informed of the attack, and he quickly left with his troops to go to Tucapel.

Valdivia and his army arrived at the ruins of Fort Tucapel, which had been burned down after its garrison retreated. A large Mapuche army led by Lautaro then suddenly emerged from the forests and attacked, which began the Battle of Tucapel. The Mapuche warriors attacked in several waves, which gradually wore down the Spaniards and their auxiliaries. Unlike in previous battles, the Spanish cavalry was unable to defeat their enemy, as the Mapuches had learned how to counter them by using pikes. After his army was routed, Valdivia attempted to escape with his horse, but he was captured by the victorious Mapuches, who planned to execute him.

=== Death ===
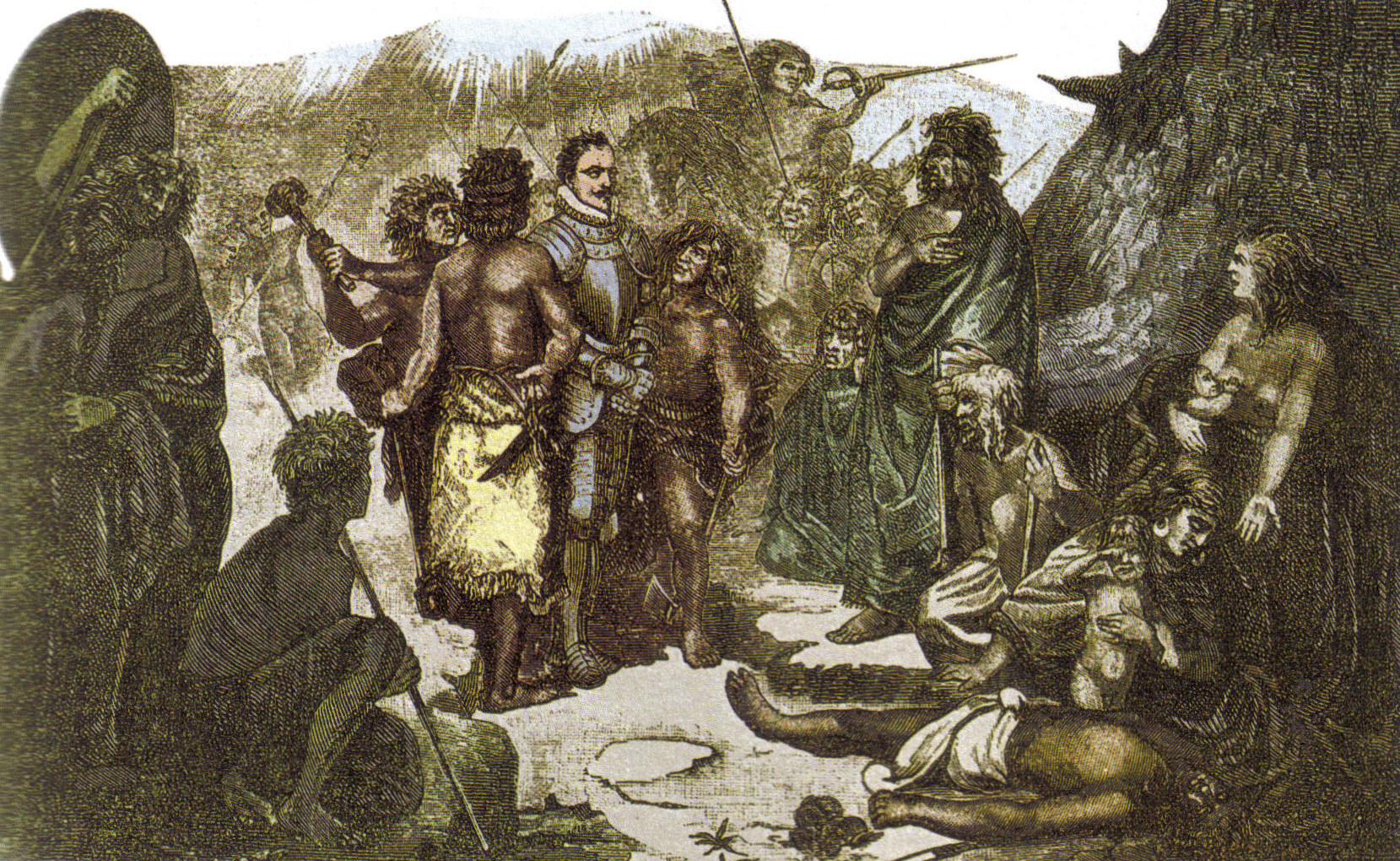
Last moments of Pedro de Valdivia before the Mapuches executed him. Etching by Nicolás Guzmán Bustamante

There are many different accounts of how Valdivia's killing took place. According to Jerónimo de Vivar, an author contemporary with the events, the execution of Valdivia was personally ordered by Caupolicán, who had him killed with a lance, and later his head, and those of two of his bravest companions, were put on display. Alonso de Góngora Marmolejo, another contemporary chronicler, writes that Valdivia offered as a ransom for his life the evacuation of all the Spanish settlements in the Mapuche lands and the gift of large herds of animals, but this offer was rejected. Alonso de Ercilla reported that Valdivia was killed with the blow of a club, and then with a knife a warrior cut open his breast and ripped out his heart. Another contemporary chronicler, Pedro Mariño de Lobera, wrote that Valdivia offered to evacuate the lands of the Mapuche but says he was shortly thereafter killed with a large club by a vengeful warrior named Pilmaiquen, who said that Valdivia could not be trusted to keep his word once freed. Lobera says that a common story in Chile at the time was that Valdivia had been killed by being forced to drink molten gold, although this story was most likely apocryphal.

The most detailed and most likely accurate account of Valdivia's death was given by Diego de Rosales, a Spanish historian who spoke with several Mapuches. According to Rosales, the Mapuches ritualistically killed Valdivia as a form of human sacrifice. After the Battle of Tucapel, a large crowd of Mapuche people gathered to watch the execution of Valdivia. The Mapuche warriors placed their spears and arrows on the ground in the shape of a circle, and they planned to kill Valdivia in the middle of this circle. When Valdivia was taken to the circle, a Mapuche man walked up behind him and killed Valdivia by smashing his head with a wooden club. The Mapuche crowd then began to stomp and chant after he was killed, and Valdivia's heart was then cut out from his body. Valdivia's heart was then cut into pieces and eaten by the Mapuche chieftains, as they believed they would absorb Valdivia's spiritual power by eating it. The Mapuches also turned Valdivia's skull into a drinking cup for chicha, and they turned his leg bones into flutes. After Valdivia's execution, the Mapuches sang a victory song and held a long celebration.

== In literature ==
Valdivia was an educated man and wielded the pen as well as the sword. In 1552 Valdivia despatched Captain Jerónimo de Alderete with a narrative of his exploits directly to the king Charles I. His twelve letters, addressed to the king and mostly preserved in the archives of the Indies, are models of a vigorous and fluent style, and of great historical interest.

His career and death are chronicled in the epic poem La Araucana by Alonso de Ercilla. He appears in the poem The Lancers of Nantucket by C.M. Foltz. He is also a major character in several historical novels, such as Inés y las raíces de la tierra, by María Correa Morande (1964); Ay Mamá Inés - Crónica Testimonial (1993) by Jorge Guzmán; Arauco: A Novel (2013), by John Caviglia; and Inés of My Soul (Spanish: Inés del alma mía) by Isabel Allende (2006), They sure did something for the history of Chile by Alvaro Espinoza.

== See also ==
- Jerónimo de Alderete
- Francisco de Villagra
- Francisco de Aguirre
- Inés de Suárez
- Juan Jufré
- Arauco War
- Mapuche people
- Lautaro
- Caupolicán
- Colocolo

== Sources ==
- Amunátegui, Miguel Luis (1913). Descubrimiento i conquista de Chile (PDF) (in Spanish). Santiago, Chile: Imprenta, Litografía i Encuadernación Barcelona. pp. 181–346.
- Barros Arana, Diego (1873). Proceso de Pedro de Valdivia i Otros Documentos Inéditos Concernientes a Este Conquistador (PDF) (in Spanish). Santiago, Chile: Librería Central de Augusto Raymond. p. 392.
- Crow, John A (1992). The Epic of Latin America (4th ed.). New York, NY: University of California Press. pp. 331–333.
- Cruz Farias, Eduardo (2002). "An overview of the Mapuche and Aztec military response to the Spanish Conquest". Archived from the original on 2004-04-06.
- Cunninghame, Graham; Robert Bontine (1973). Pedro de Valdivia, Conqueror of Chile. Boston, MA: Milford House Inc.
- Ercilla, Alonso de. La Araucana (in Spanish). Eswikisource.
- Eyzaguirre, Jaime (1942). Ventura de Pedro de Valdivia (PDF) (in Spanish). Santiago, Chile: Ediciones Ercilla. p. 198. Archived from the original (PDF) on 2012-02-18.
- Gasca, Pedro de la (1548). Información secreta... sobre el estado de las provincias de Chile cuando salió de ellas Pedro de Valdivia (PDF) (in Spanish). Transcription. Lima, Peru. p. 2. Archived from the original (PDF) on 2016-03-03.
- Góngora Marmolejo, Alonso de (1960). Historia de Todas las Cosas que han Acaecido en el Reino de Chile y de los que lo han gobernado (1536–1575). Crónicas del Reino de Chile (in Spanish). Madrid, Spain: Atlas. pp. 75–224.
- Mariño de Lobera, Pedro (1960). Fr. Bartolomé de Escobar (ed.). Crónica del Reino de Chile, escrita por el capitán Pedro Mariño de Lobera... reducido a nuevo método y estilo por el Padre Bartolomé de Escobar (1593). Crónicas del Reino de Chile (in Spanish). Madrid, Spain: Atlas. pp. 227–562.
- Medina, José Toribio (1906). Diccionario Biográfico Colonial de Chile (PDF) (in Spanish). Santiago, Chile: Imprenta Elzeviriana. p. 1,006.
- Prescott, William H (1843). History of the Conquest of Peru. New York, NY: The Modern Library. Archived from the original on 2015-12-23.
- Roa y Urzúa, Luis de (1935). La Familia de Don Pedro de Valdivia, Conquistador de Chile (PDF) (in Spanish). Sevilla: Imprenta de la Gavidia. p. 119. Archived from the original (PDF) on 2016-03-03.
- Valdivia, Pedro de (1960). Cartas. Crónicas del Reino de Chile (in Spanish). Madrid, Spain: Atlas. pp. 1–74.
- Vivar, Jerónimo de (1987). Crónica y relación copiosa y verdadera de los reinos de Chile (1558) (in Spanish). Madrid, Spain: ARTEHISTORIA REVISTA DIGITAL.
- "Pedro de Valdivia". Vi-E Educación al día (in Spanish). Archived from the original on 27 March 2009.
- "Pedro de Valdivia". Biografía de Chile (in Spanish).

Government offices
| Preceded by none | Royal Governor of Chile; 1540–1547 | Succeeded by Francisco de Villagra |
| Preceded by Francisco de Villagra | Royal Governor of Chile; 1549–1553 | Succeeded by Francisco de Villagra |
