= Jerónimo de Vivar =

Jerónimo de Vivar was a Spanish historian of the early conquest and settlement of the Kingdom of Chile, and author of Crónica y relación copiosa y verdadera de los reinos de Chile.

Little is known about his life except that according to his own conclusion to the Crónica he was born in Burgos, Spain. He had come to the Indies some time before coming to Chile but no record of his passage was recorded. It is thought he arrived in Chile with the forces returning in 1549, from Peru with Francisco de Villagra overland. This gave him an opportunity to make detailed observation on the places and people in northern Chile that appear in the Crónica.

Vivar was an eyewitness to some events, like Pedro de Valdivia's overland expedition to settle Concepcion and the Battle of Andalien in 1550, some of the sea voyages described, and the expedition to settle Valdivia and the exploration of the surrounding area. He often wrote based on reports of others that had witnessed the events from the time of the first settlement, including official documents. Because of similarities to these documents some historians believed he was actually Valdivia's secretary, Juan de Cárdenas writing under a pseudonym. However a study of their known movements and activities precluded that being the case.

It is thought that he was working to compile a detailed account of the history of the conquest and an account of the land of Chile promised by Pedro de Valdivia to the king of Spain in a letter of 1552. This task he finished while in Santiago, in 1558 according to his colophon in the book. Nothing more is known about him. His book remained a manuscript. It was known to the Chilean historian Diego de Rosales writing in the following century and listed by a few other compilers of historical documents at that time. It then disappeared and was only found in the middle of the Twentieth century, being first published by the Fondo Histórico y Bibliográfico José Toribio Medina in 1966.

== See also ==
- History of Chile
