= Baltasar de Barrionuevo =

Baltasar de Ávila Barrionuevo

Conquistador at the service of the Spanish Empire
- Monarch: Charles V

Personal details
- Born: 1519 Toledo, Spain
- Died: 1584 (aged 64–65) Peru
- Occupation: Politician
- Profession: Armed forces

Military service
- Allegiance: Spain
- Branch/service: Spanish Army
- Rank: Captain

Baltasar de Barrionuevo (1519–1584?) was a Spanish military man, who participated in the conquest of the Peru, Chile, and Tucumán.

== Biography ==
Barrionuevo was born 1519 in Talavera de la Reina, son of a distinguished Spanish family. Being very young he traveled to the Americas taking part of the conquest of Peru. Later he served in Chile under orders of Captain Francisco de Aguirre.

In 1549 Barrionuevo accompanied by Juan Núñez de Prado, attended in the founding of the city of San Miguel and Talavera de Esteco, Tucumán. Baltasar also was Regidor in the Cabildo de Chile.

His son Baltasar de Ávila, attended the foundation of La Rioja in 1591, also was Alcalde in Catamarca. Baltasar jr. was married to Juana Bazán de Pedraza, granddaughter of Conquistador Juan Gregorio Bazán.
