= El Barco (settlement) =

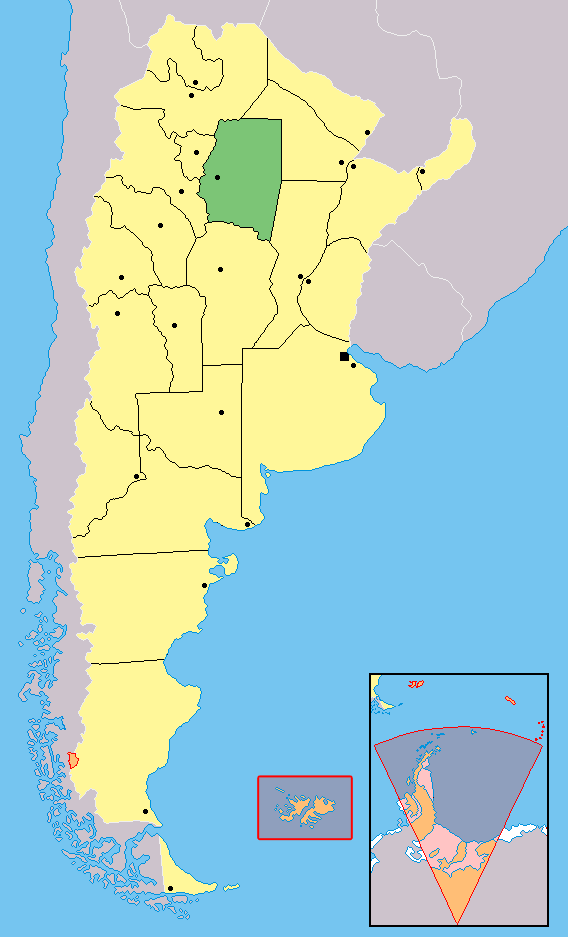
Province of Santiago del Estero in Argentina

El Barco was a short-lived Spanish settlement in what is now the Republic of Argentina, on the banks of the Dulce River. It was the first town in the region of Tucumán, occupied from 1550 to 1553.

El Barco was founded in mid-1550 by a conquering expedition from Upper Peru under the command of Captain Juan Núñez de Prado, who had been sent by Pedro de la Gasca, President of the Real Audiencia de Lima. The settlement was named in honor of La Gasca's hometown, El Barco de Ávila. Nunez de Prado distributed land, appointed members to the council and ordered the construction of a fort to protect the settlement from the Calchaquís.

The site was poorly chosen, and the next year Núñez de Prado ordered it moved about a kilometer to the north. In 1553 Francisco de Aguirre with a group of sixty well-armed men from Chile deposed Núñez de Prado and expelled him along with his deputy Juan Vázquez and the two Dominican friars who had accompanied him, fathers Gaspar Carvajal and Alonso Trueno. Soon after Aguirre ordered the transfer of the settlement to a new location, calling it Santiago del Estero del Nuevo Maestrazgo, the present Santiago del Estero. Many of the residents of El Barco were the first inhabitants of Santiago del Estero.

Santiago del Estero was the main center for colonization of the region for a long time, until in 1699 the capital of the Governorship of Tucumán was moved to Salta, and some time later to Córdoba.
