= Francisco de Merlo =

Escribano Francisco de Merlo
- Coat of Arms of Merlo

Escribano Mayor of the Río de la Plata
- In office 1716–?
- Monarch: Philip V
- Preceded by: Tomás Troncoso
- Succeeded by: ?

Personal details
- Born: Francisco de Merlo y Barbosa; August 11, 1693 Sevilla, Spain
- Died: April 4, 1758 (aged 64) Buenos Aires, Viceroyalty of Peru
- Occupation: Government landowner
- Profession: Jurist
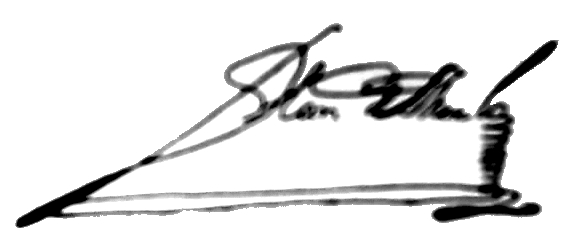
- Signature

Military service
- Allegiance: Spain

Francisco de Merlo (1693-1758) was a Spanish notary and politician, who served during the Viceroyalty of Peru as Notary Mayor of the Government of Buenos Aires. He was the founder of the city of Merlo (Buenos Aires Province), and also took part in the foundation of Montevideo in the Banda Oriental.

== Biography ==
Merlo was born in Sevilla, the son of Antonio de Merlo and Juana Gerónima Barbosa, a distinguished Spanish family. He was married twice, first in Spain to María Teresa de Gámiz, daughter of Pedro Gamiz de las Cuevas and Tomasa Álvarez de Lasarte, natives of Madrid. And second on November 30, 1713 in Buenos Aires, with Francisca del Toro, daughter of Damián del Toro and Lucía González de Marquina, belonging to an illustrious family.

On 19 September 1716, Francisco de Merlo was appointed as Escribano Mayor de Gobierno of the Río de la Plata. In 1717, he notified the City Council of Buenos Aires about the death of King Louis XIV of France, who had died two years ago in Versailles. Exercising the position of notary of government he participated in the founding act of the city of Montevideo. And on August 28, 1755, he founded the town of Merlo in Buenos Aires Province.

Francisco de Merlo and his wife Francisca del Toro were godparents of Antonio Espinosa Barrionuevo, descendant of Baltasar de Barrionuevo, a Spanish conquistador, born in Talavera de la Reina.
