= Master of Ávila =

Spanish painter

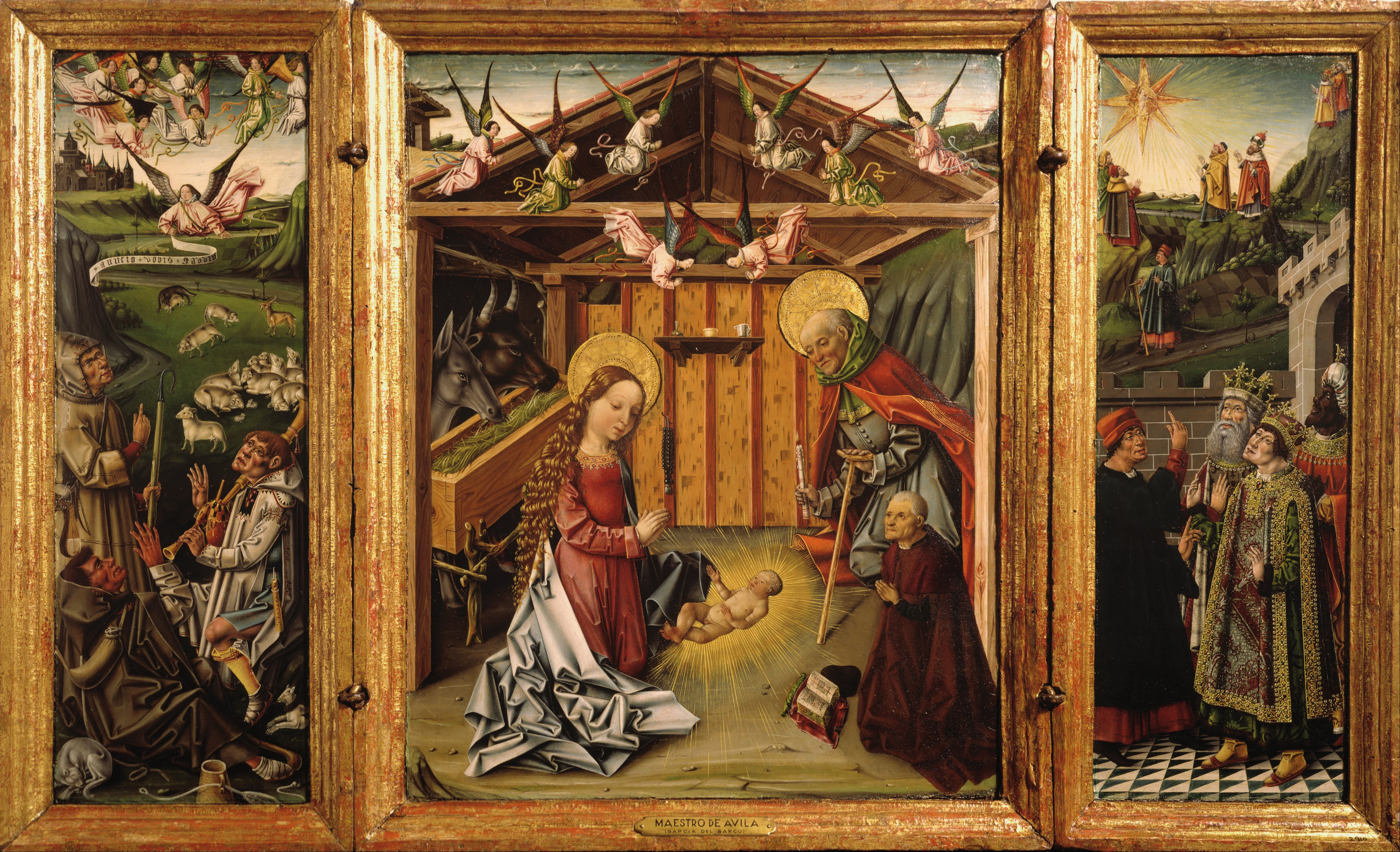
Triptych of the Nativity, Lázaro Galdiano Museum

The Master of Ávila is the name given to an anonymous painter who was active in Ávila and its surroundings in the middle of the 15th century. He worked in the Flemish style of Fernando Gallego.

The art historian Elías Tormo and others have tentatively identified him as García del Barco, a painter who was known to have been in Ávila between 1465 and 1473. No works by Barco have been attributed with any certainty.

== Works ==
His artistic "personality" is based on a triptych of the Nativity, originally at the Convent of the Conception; currently at the Lázaro Galdiano Museum. It shows some resemblance to the panels of an altarpiece at the Iglesia Mayor de la Asunción de Nuestra Señora in El Barco de Ávila, which also corresponds to some of the stylistic elements in the works of the Master of La Sisla, who may have been his apprentice.

Other works that have been ascribed to him include the Abrazo ante la Puerta Dorada (Embrace Before the Golden Gate) at the Church of San Vicente de Ávila, a triptych of Saint Dominic and Saint Thomas at the Museum of Vitoria, and altarpieces at the Churches of Saint Martin in Bonilla de la Sierra and Saint Peter at the Cathedral of Ávila. Recently, a "Calvary" at the Museo del Prado, originally assigned to Fernando Gallego, has been re-attributed to him.

== García del Barco ==
García del Barco was known to be active as a painter in Ávila during the 1460s, when he sold a horse to a local clergyman. He appears as a "famous painter" in 1473, when he was hired by Gallego to work on an altarpiece at Coria Cathedral and was subsequently delegated to act as one of his arbitrators in the event of litigation. The other arbitrator named was one Father Pedro de Salamanca, who has also been proposed as a candidate for being the Master. In 1476, del Barco and another painter named Juan Rodríguez undertook to paint the doors and ceilings of the Castillo de El Barco de Ávila with Moorish designs, as documented by Juan Agustín Ceán Bermúdez in his Diccionario histórico de los más ilustres profesores de las Bellas Artes en España.

At an undetermined date, after 1492, he went to Granada, where he died sometime after 1498.
