= Juan Núñez de Prado (conquistador) =

Spanish conquistador

- Born: Badajoz, Spain
- Occupation: Soldier
- Known for: Conquest of Tucumán

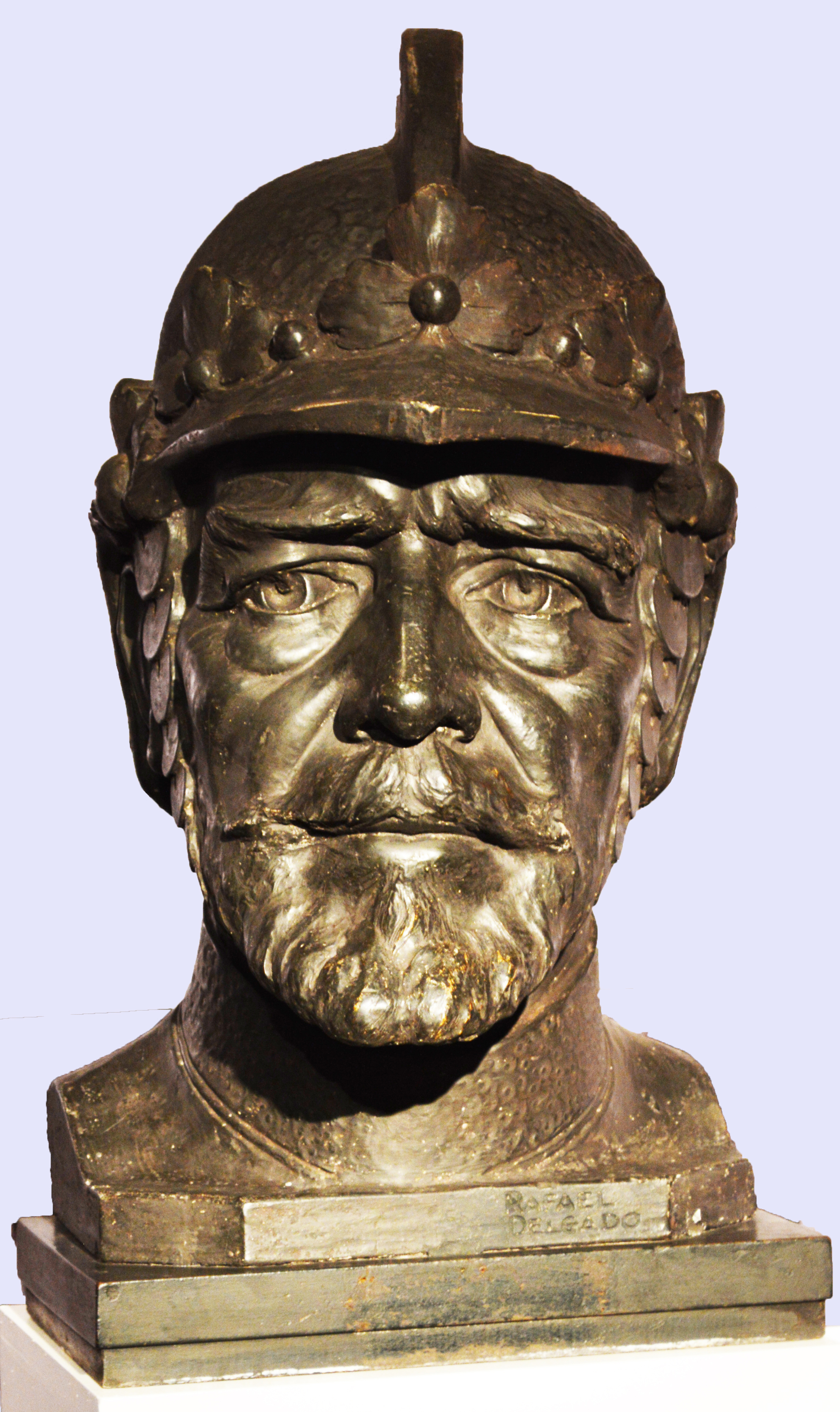

Juan Núñez de Prado was a 16th-century Spanish conquistador who is known for his conquest of Tucumán Province in what is now Argentina.

== Early career ==
Juan Núñez de Prado was born in Badajoz, in the Extremadura region of Spain. He moved to Peru in the early 1540s, and became a supporter of Gonzalo Pizarro, taking part on his side in the civil wars. Before 1548 he had been appointed Alcade of the Potosí mines. While holding this office, he went over to the royal forces before the Battle of Jaquijahuana and assisted in the victory over Pizarro's supporters. At the end of the civil war Captain Núñez de Prado returned to the city of Chuquisaca in Upper Peru.

Since the royal forces had triumphed at Jaquijahuana, in 1549 Pedro de la Gasca granted Juan Núñez de Prado the territory of Tucumán in modern Argentina in return for his valuable services. This was a poorly defined area that roughly corresponded to the southern part of modern Bolivia and the northern part of modern Argentina. After receiving La Gasca's instructions for his mission, Núñez de Prado raised money from his property and from some of his friends. He prepared to leave with a force of 84 volunteers.

== Conquest of Tucumán ==
Núñez de Prado travelled through the valleys of Tupiza, Jujuy and Chicoana to reach his new territory and to find a site for its capital. He chose a location on the banks of the Dulce River and founded the city of El Barco. It was named in honor of La Gasca, who was born in El Barco de Ávila in Spain. He built a fort, and brought settlers from Upper Peru. Prado seems to have wanted to use peaceful methods to civilize the Indians. The territory was occupied by the Calchaquí people. He found that they were not inclined to resist. Prado named his province Tucuman after Tucumamahao, one of the leaders of the local people who formed an alliance with him.

According to Funes, the original settlement of Ciudad del Barco was destroyed in 1552 when the Dulce River overflowed.

Some of Prado's followers attacked a group of soldiers of Francisco de Villagra who were travelling to Chile. Núñez de Prado considered that he was within the jurisdiction of Peru since the governor of Peru had awarded him the province. Pedro de Valdivia, the governor of Chile, disagreed and claimed the territory for Chile. In a letter to the Emperor, Valdivia claimed that Prado had abandoned Barco and returned to Peru, although this was not true. Valdivia gave Captain Francisco de Aguirre the task of taking Tucuman for Chile. Aguirre left on 8 November 1552 and reached El Barco in December. Prado was away from the settlement when Aguirre arrived, but on his return was arrested and sent under guard to Chile. Some of Prado's men were sent to Lima, and Aguirre established Chilean authority in the new territory.

Aguirre initiated a vigorous and aggressive policy towards the Indians, allocating them to his followers as forced laborers to work on their landholdings. The result was a rebellion. The colonists were greatly outnumbered, and in 1553 had to retreat beyond the Dulce River to a location a few leagues away, where they founded Santiago del Estero. In 1554 Aguirre returned to Chile in hope of being made governor in place of Valdivia, who had died. Many of the colonists took advantage of his absence to abandon the settlement and return to Chile or Peru.

== Illegalities and usurpations ==
During the American conquest, there were several instances of abuse among the conquerors. For lack of clear boundaries or natural limits to their concessions, or deliberately, some conquistadors found cities in neighboring territories, or took possession of wealth that was not in the territory assigned to them. These arbitrary or unintentional interferences caused endless confrontation and lawsuits, which were not always resolved satisfactorily for both sides.

In the case of El Barco, Valdivia, with the voluntarily help of Francisco de Aguirre, meant to arbitrarily extend his Chilean jurisdiction to the southeast of his assigned territory. As the jurisdiction of Tucumán then belonged to Peru, the Royal Audience of Lima captured Francisco de Aguirre and imprisoned him for abuse, demanding the release and reinstatement of Núñez de Prado. However, he died before he was able to return.
