= El Greco Museum, Toledo =

Single-artist museum in Toledo, Spain

El Greco Museum
- Museo del Greco
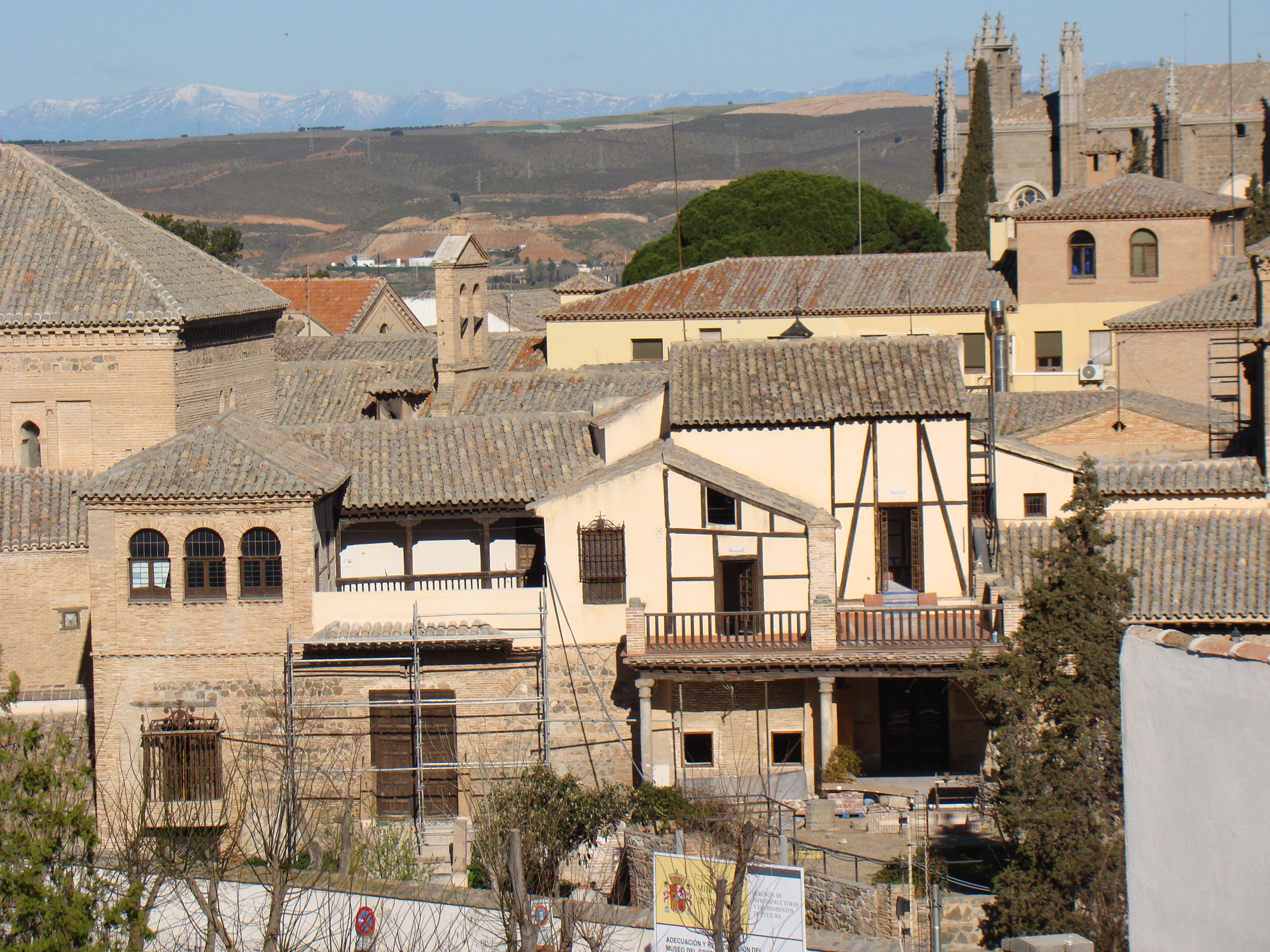
- View of the Museum
- Location: Toledo, Spain
- Coordinates: 39°51′22″N 4°01′44″W
- Type: Single-artist museum

Spanish Cultural Heritage
- Official name: Casa y Museo del Greco
- Type: Non-movable
- Criteria: Monument
- Designated: 1 March 1962
- Reference no.: RI-51-0001411

The El Greco Museum (Spanish: Museo del Greco) is a single-artist museum in Toledo, Spain, devoted to the work and life of El Greco (Domenikos Theotokopoulos, 1541–1614), who spent much of his life in Toledo. It is one of the National Museums of Spain and it is attached to the Ministry of Culture.

== The house and museum ==
The museum first opened in 1911 and is located in the Jewish Quarter of Toledo. It consists of two buildings, a 16th-century house with a courtyard and an early 20th-century building forming the museum, together with a garden. The house recreates the home of El Greco, which no longer exists. The museum houses many artworks by El Greco, especially from his late period. There are also paintings by other 17th-century Spanish artists, as well as furniture from the period and pottery from Talavera de la Reina in the Province of Toledo.

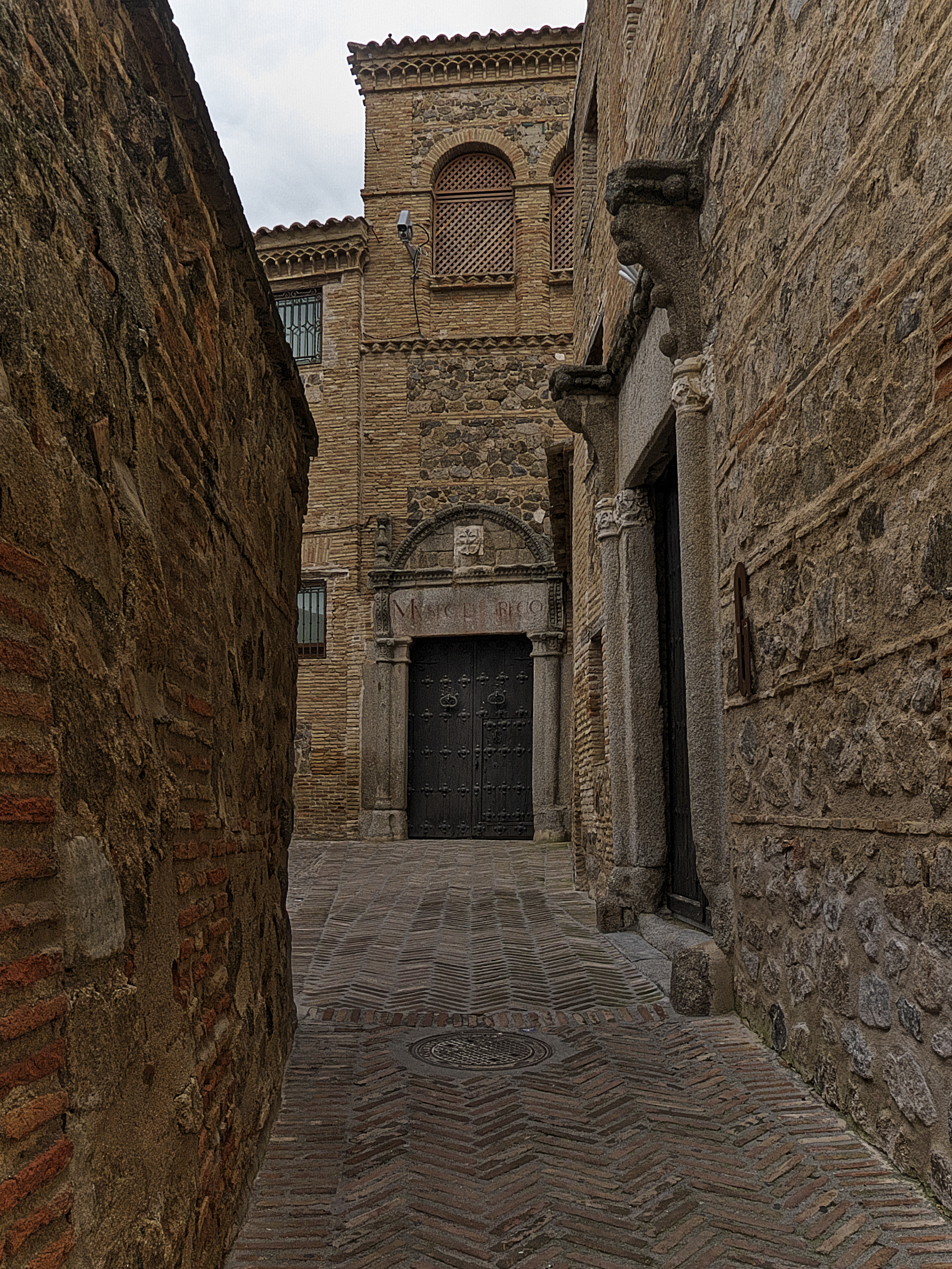
Entrance

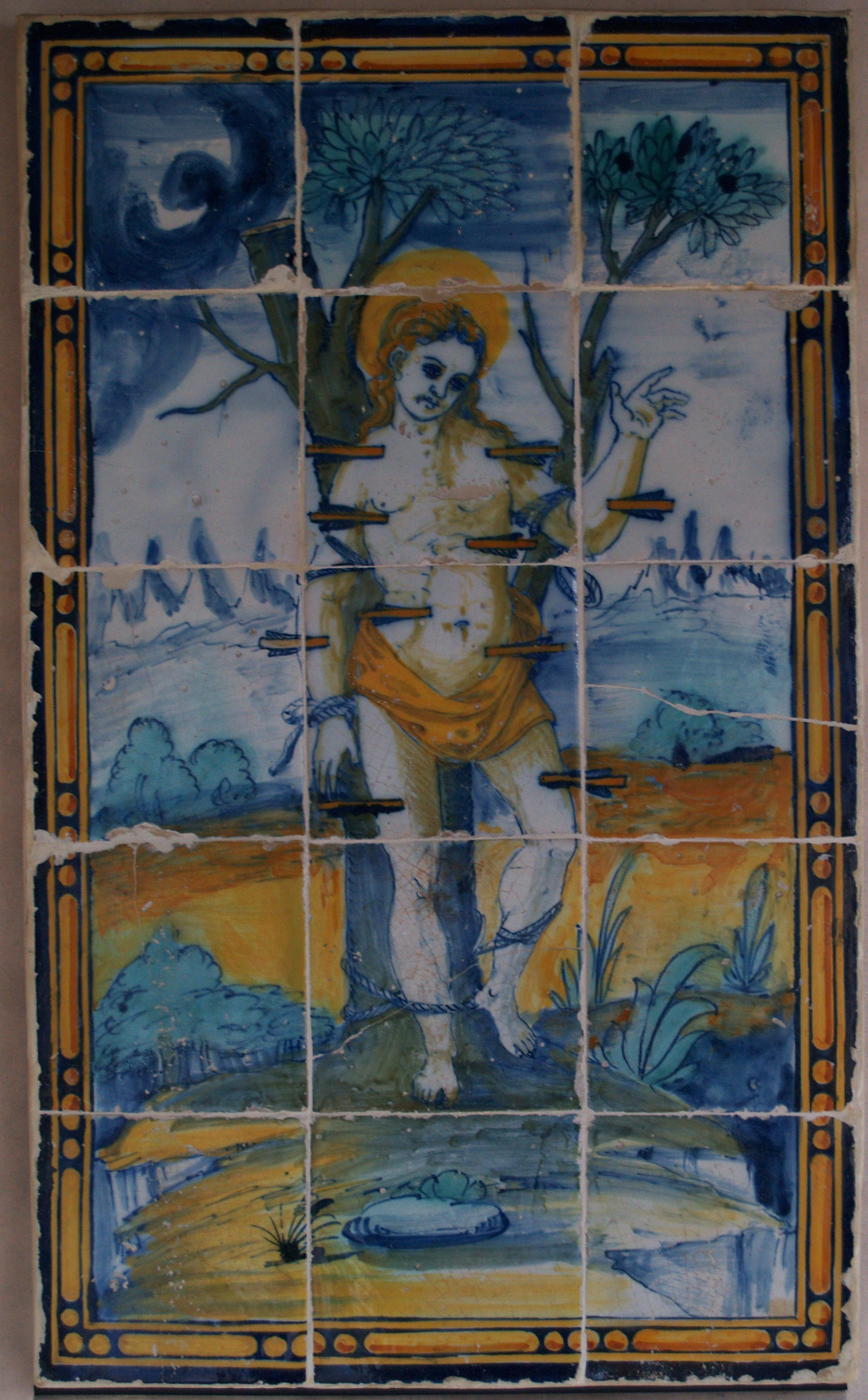
Tiled image of San Sebastian

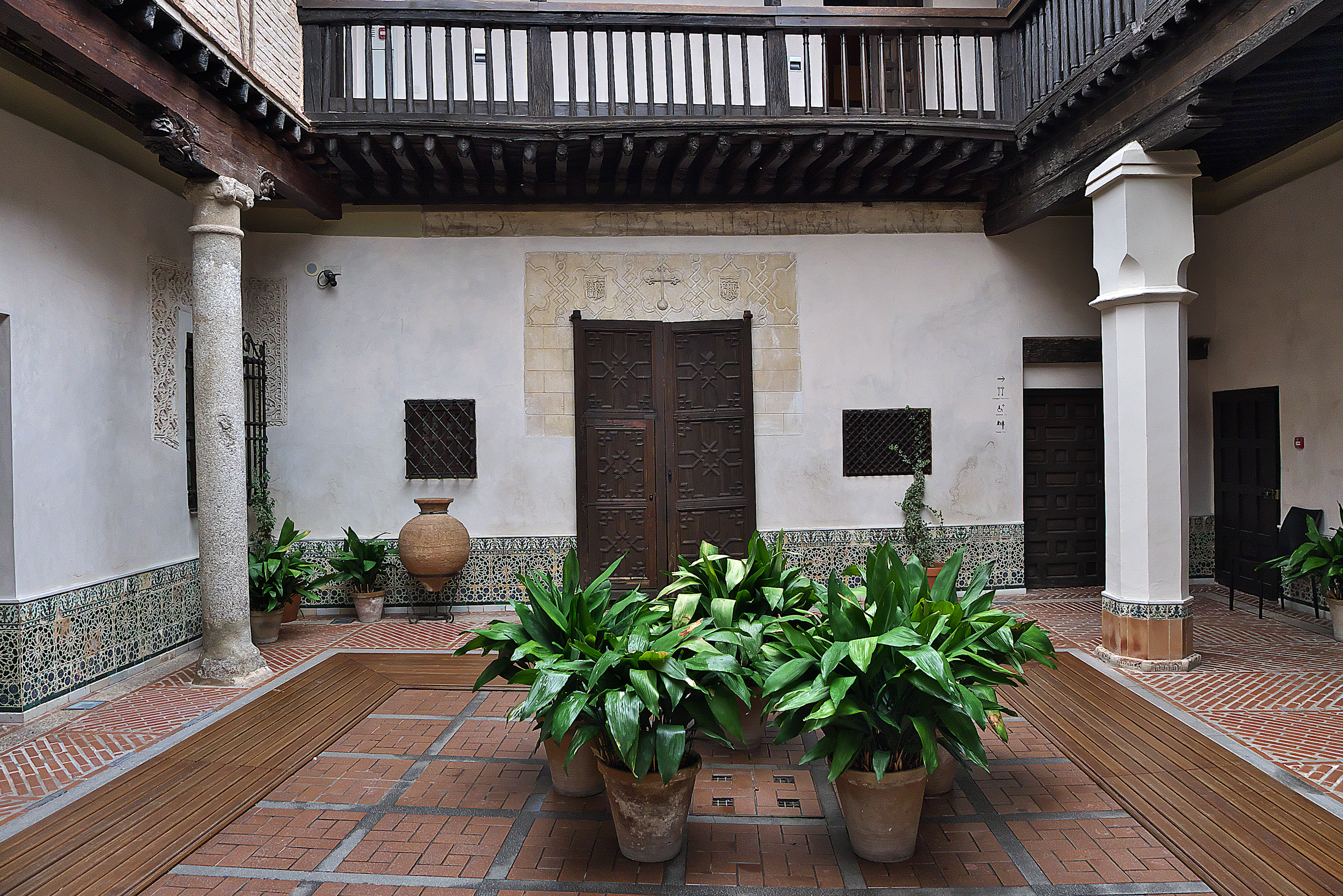
Courtyard

== Collection ==
Apostalado by El Greco

A complete series of 13 paintings portraying Christ and his disciples originally produced between 1610 and 1614 by El Greco and his workshop for the Hospital de Santiago in Toledo. The series was conceived and executed as a single project, with Christ looking directly out of the picture, six of the disciples looking to the left and six to the right. The disciples represent his 12 original followers, except that the disgraced Judas Iscariot is replaced by Saint Paul. All the works are oil on canvas with a size of 97 x 77 cm.

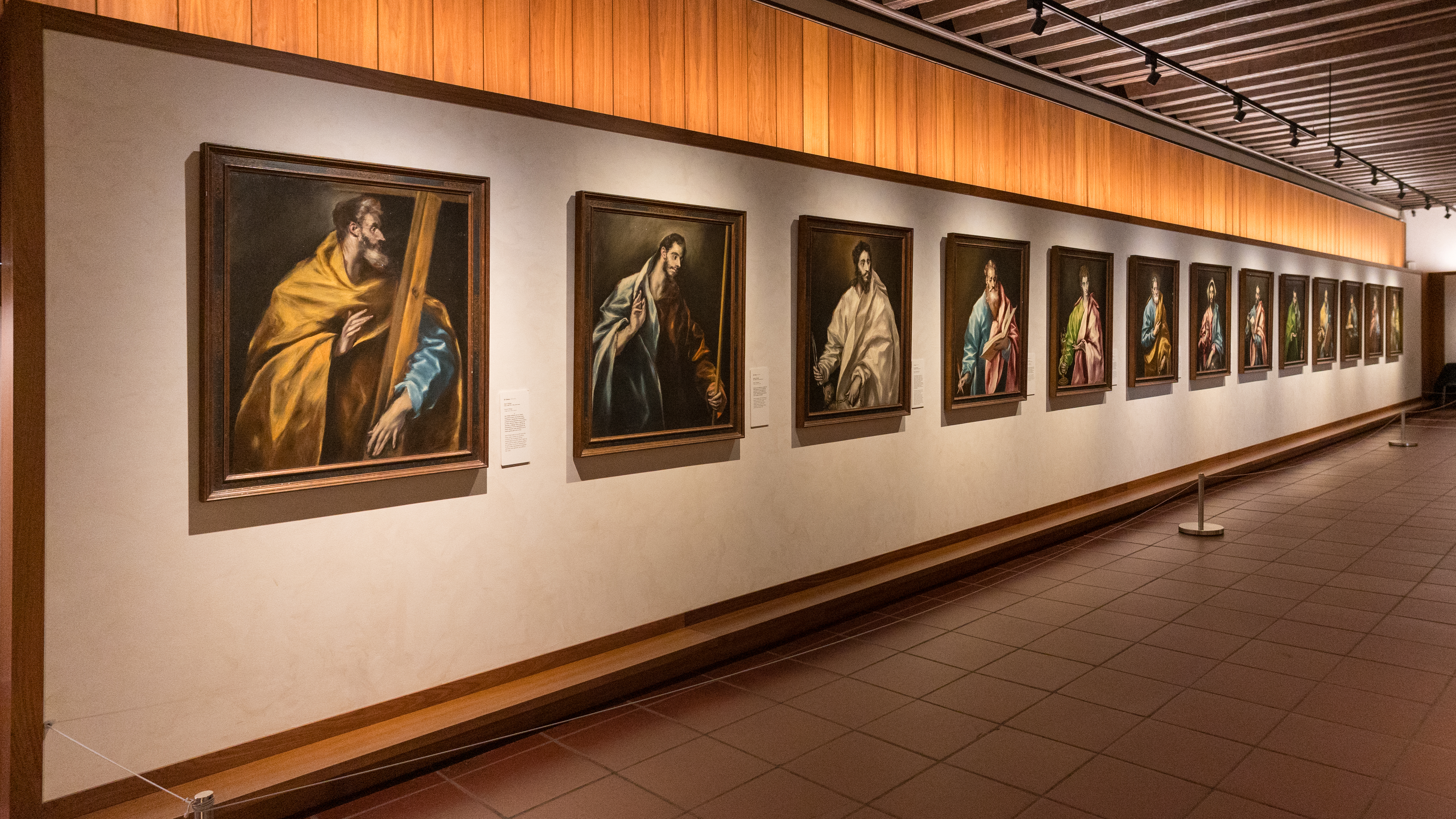
View of gallery

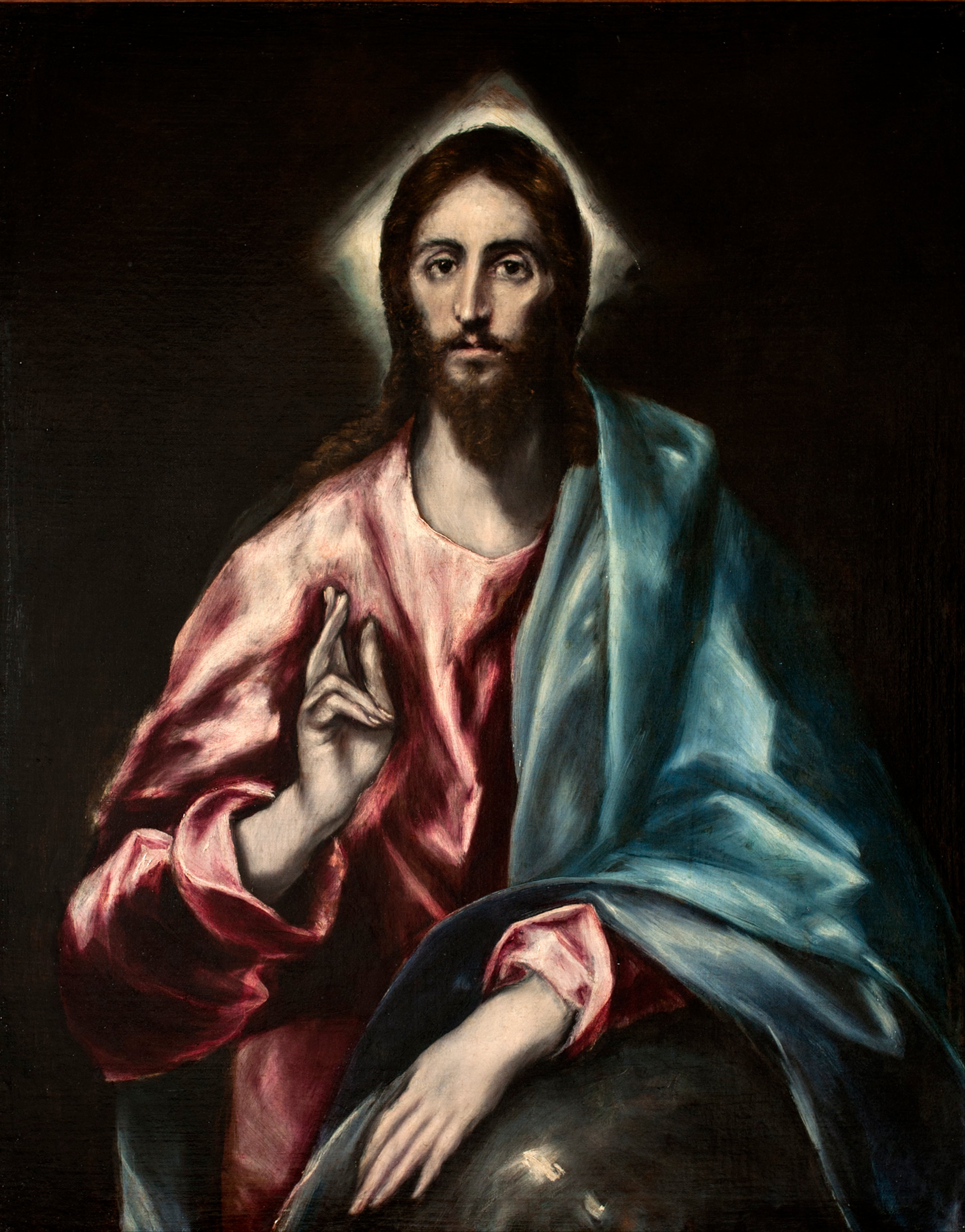
Christ as Saviour

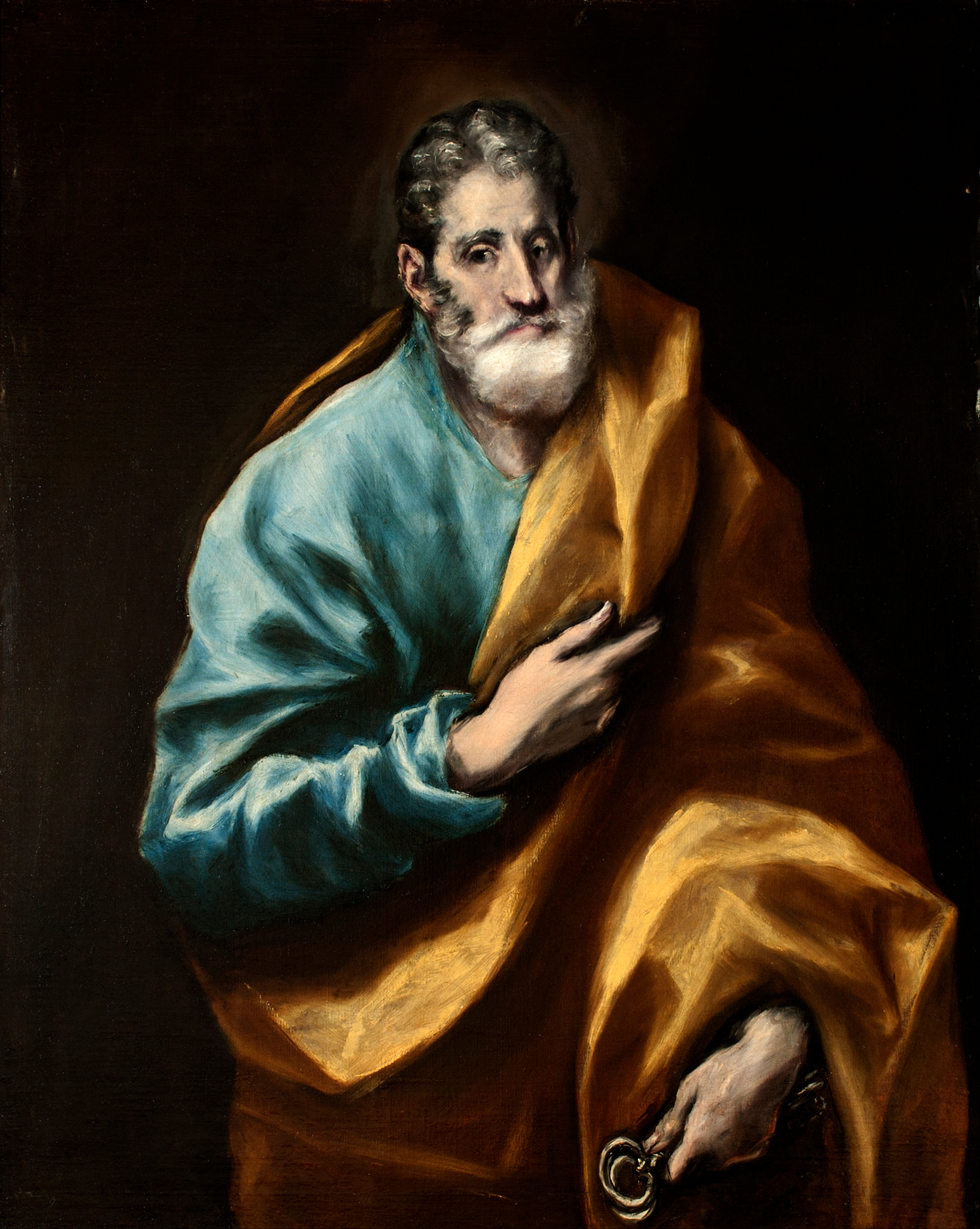
Saint Peter

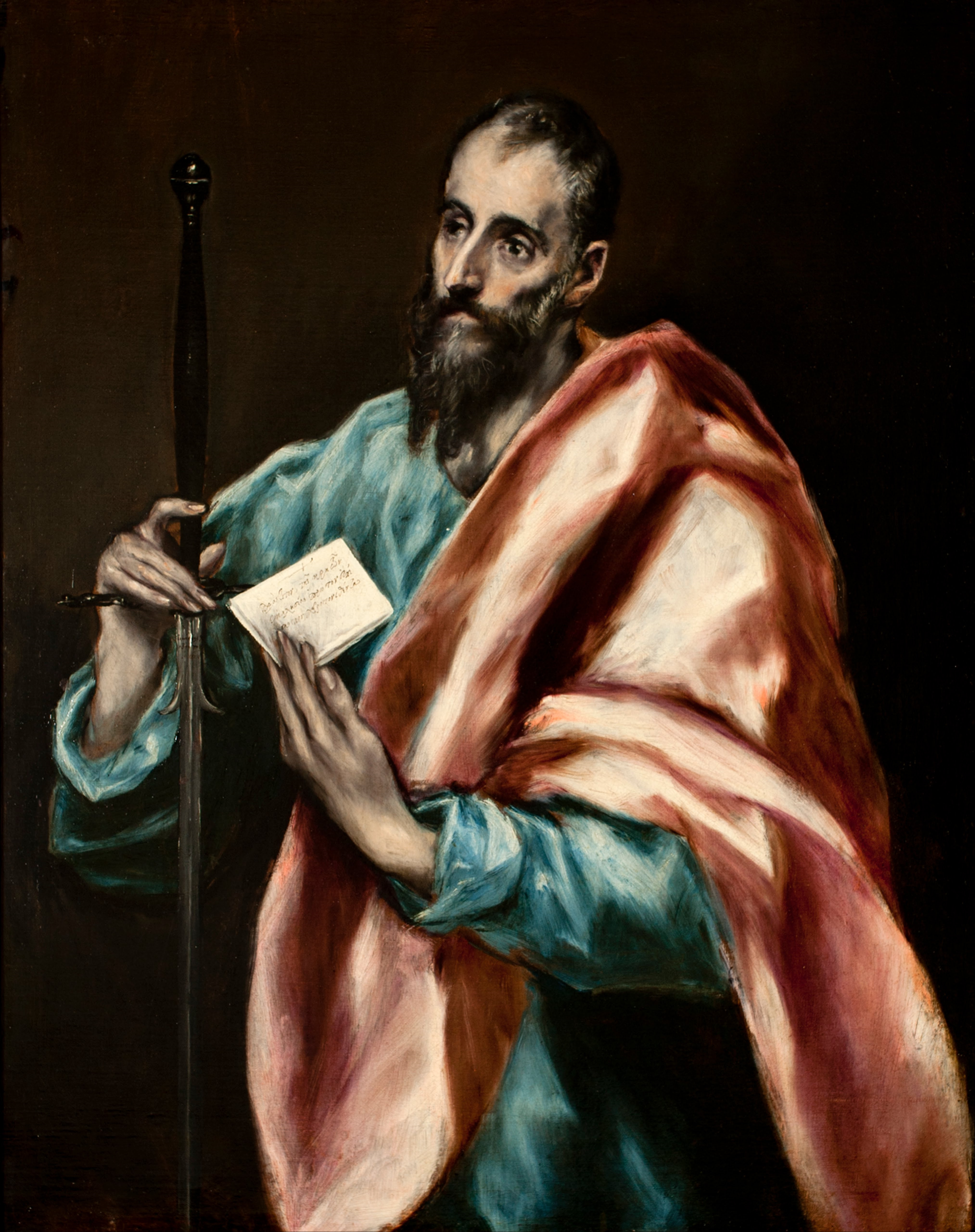
Saint Paul

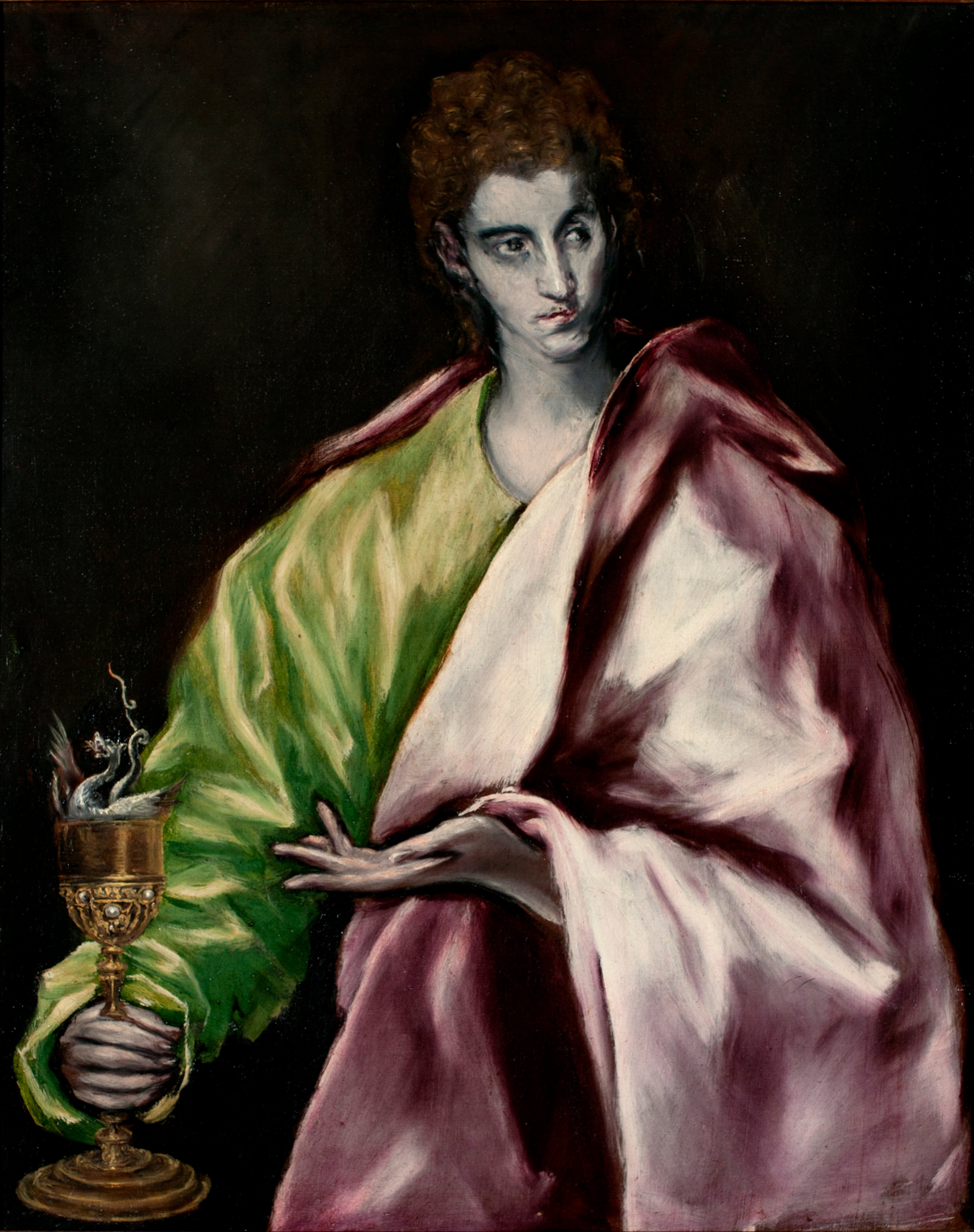
St John the Evangelist

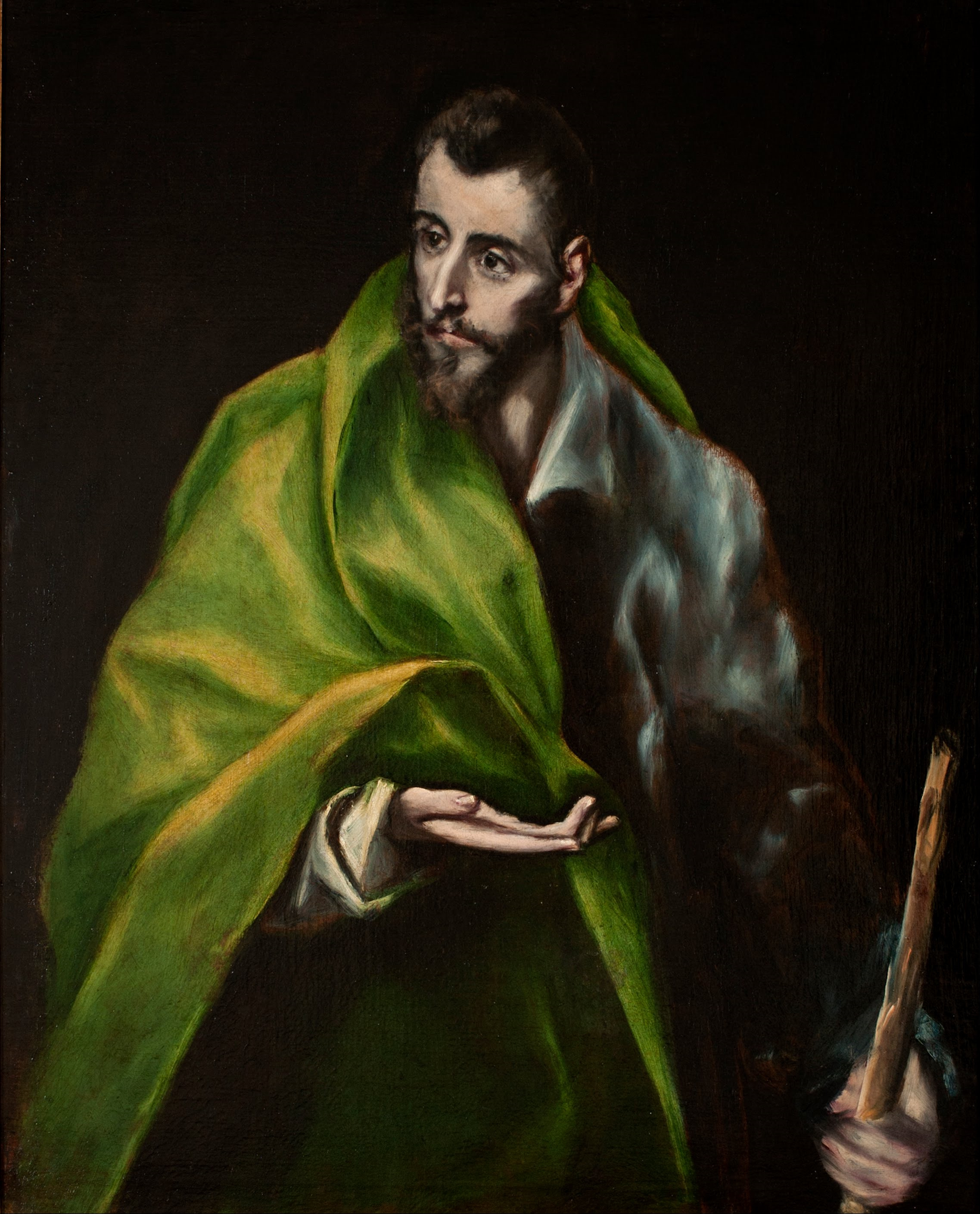
Saint James the Greater

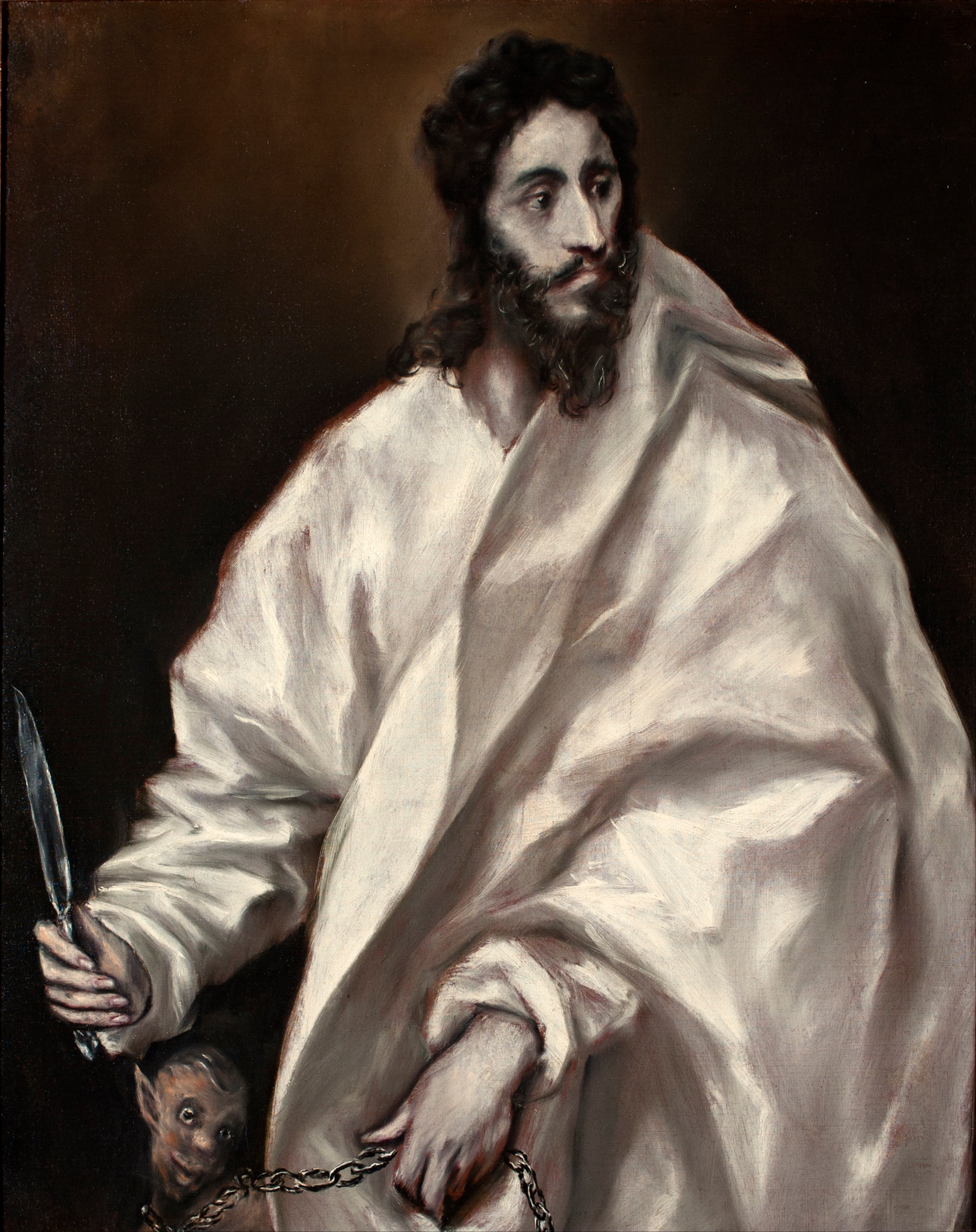
Saint Bartholomew

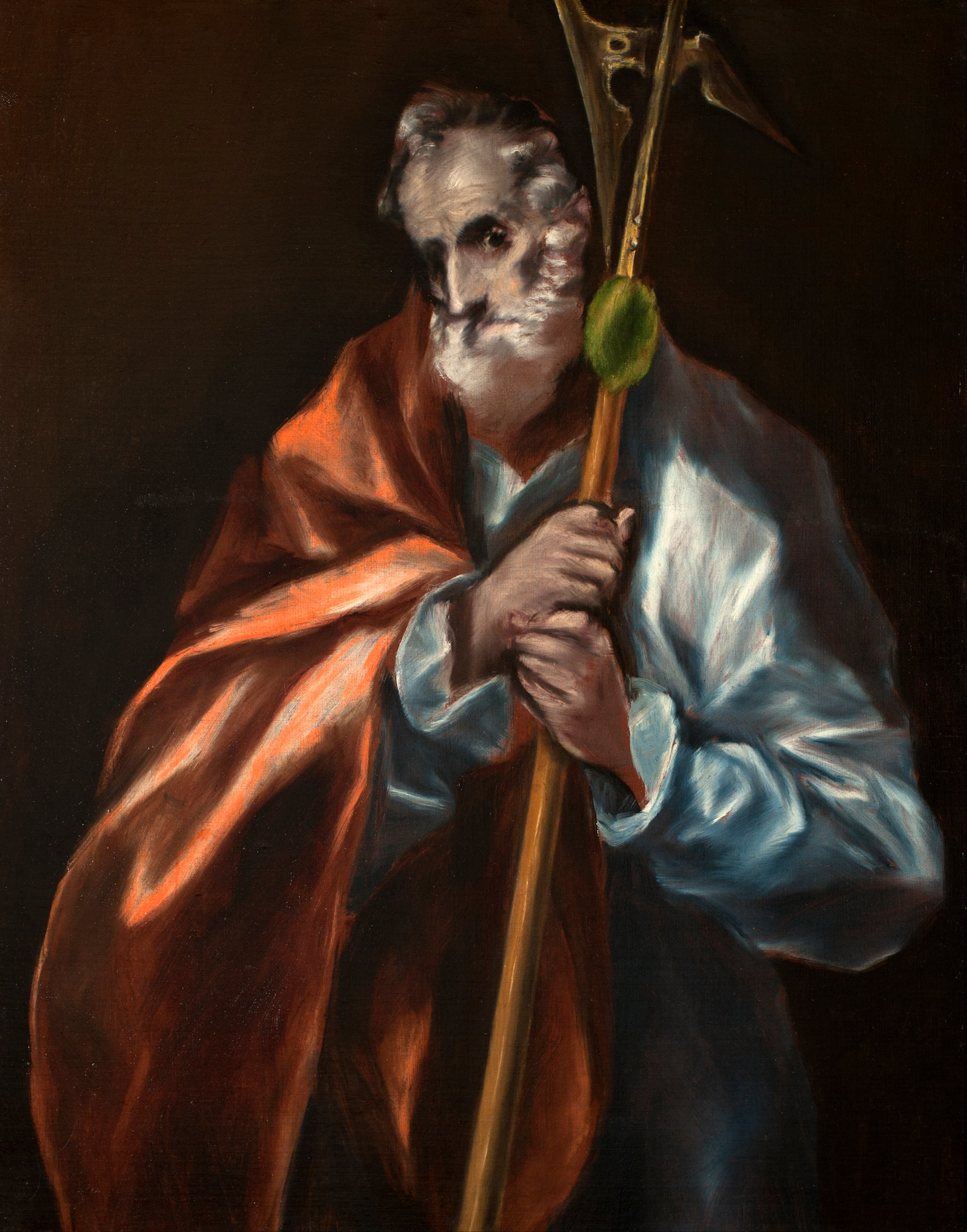
Saint Thaddeus (Jude)

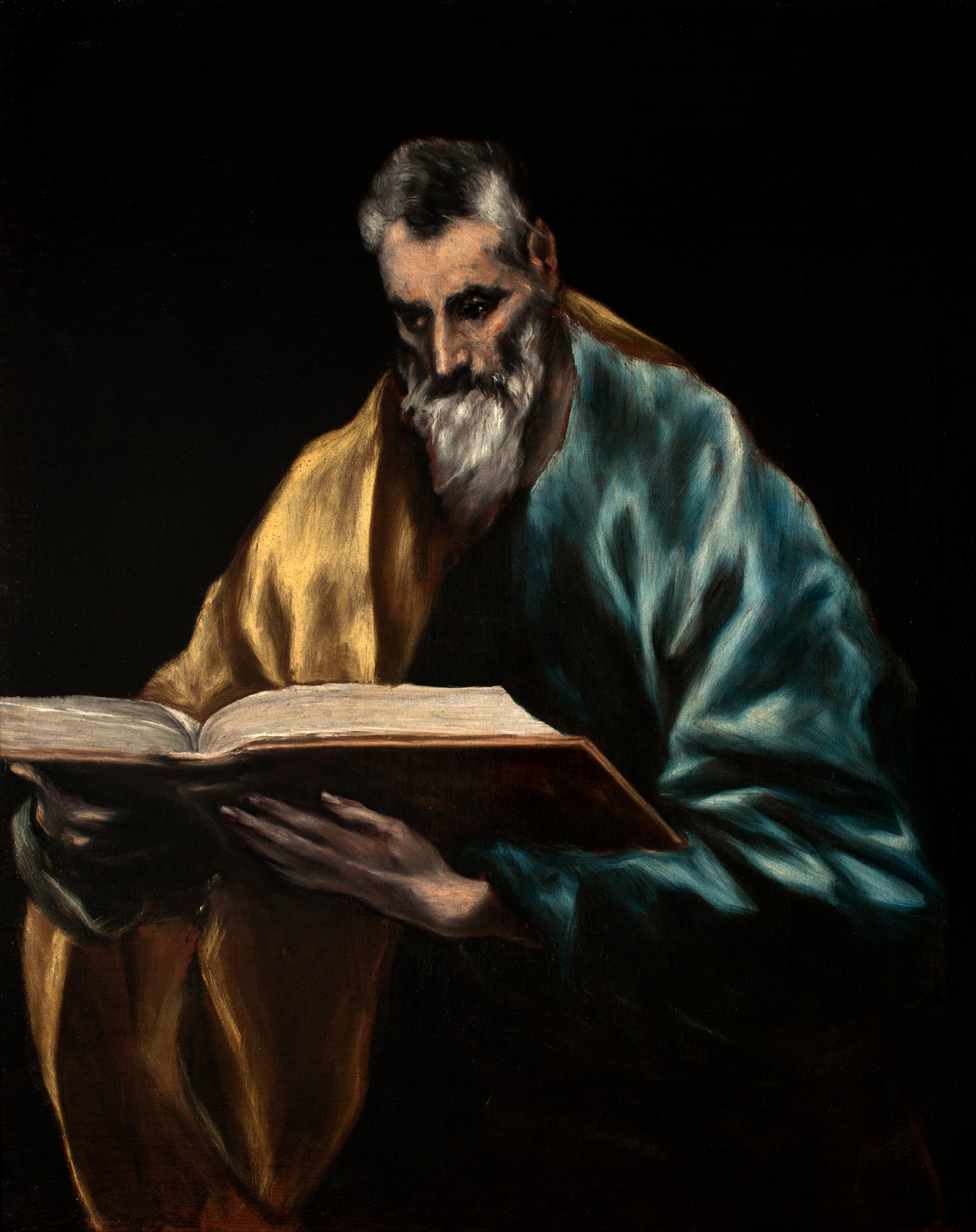
Saint Simon

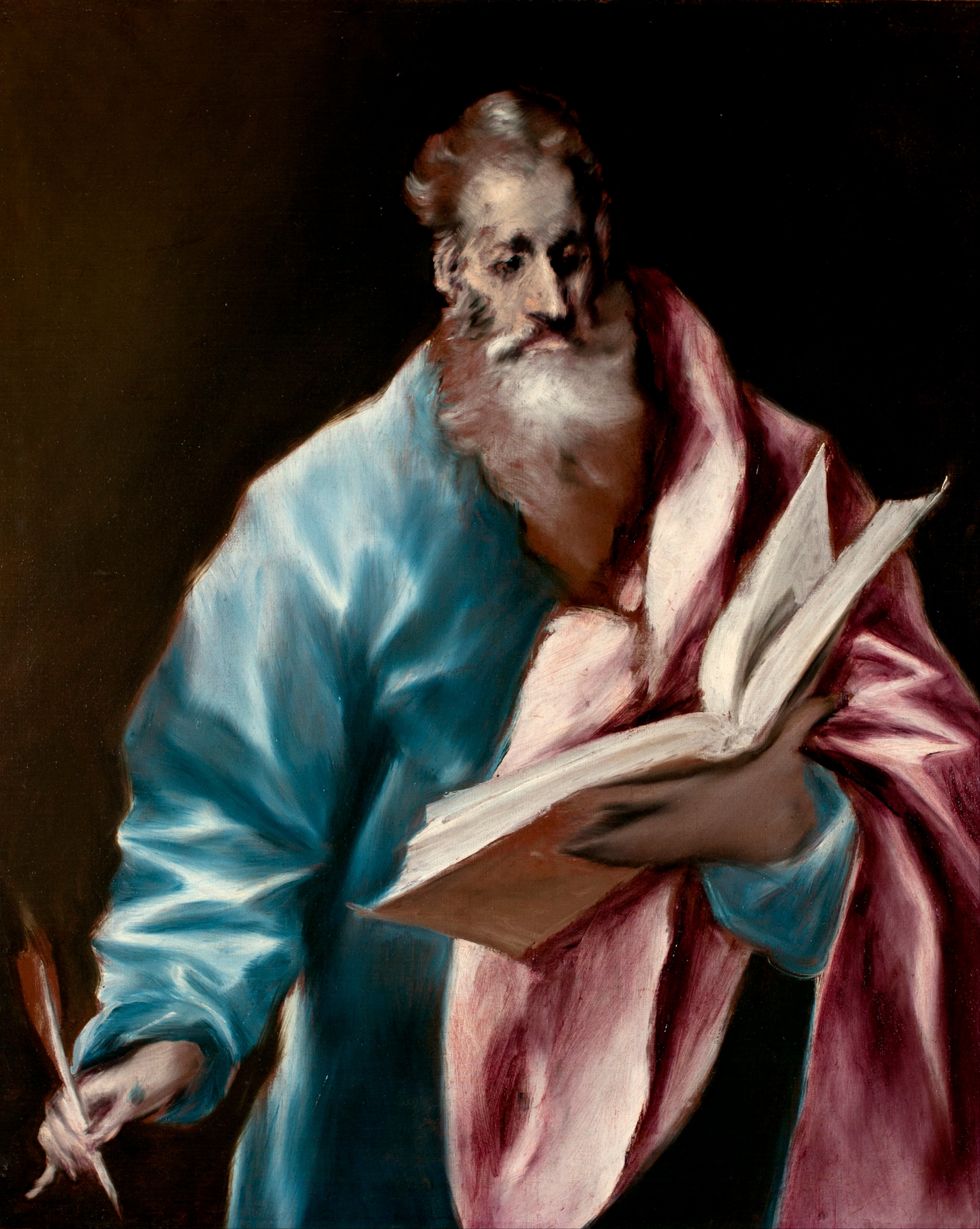
Saint Matthew

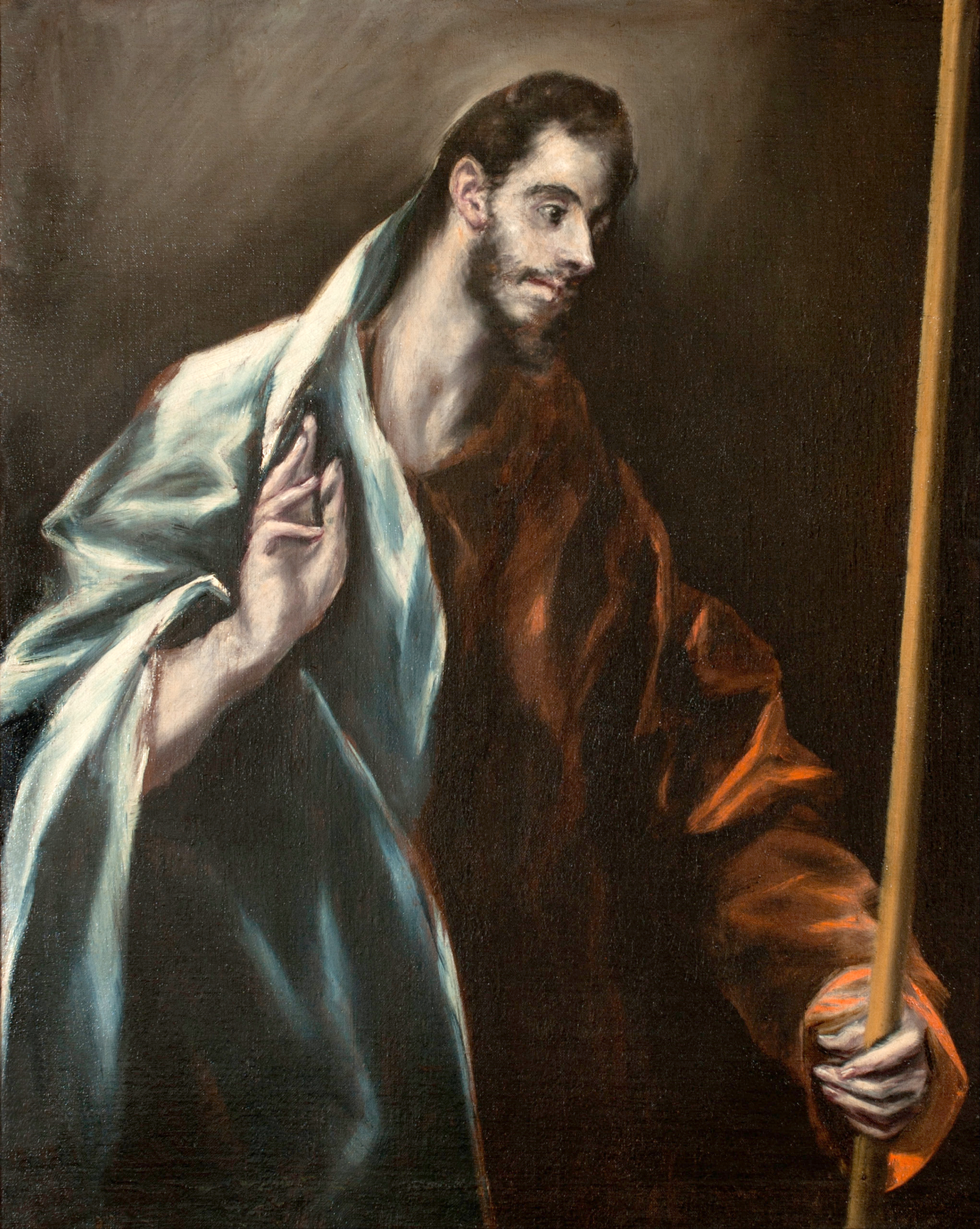
Saint Thomas

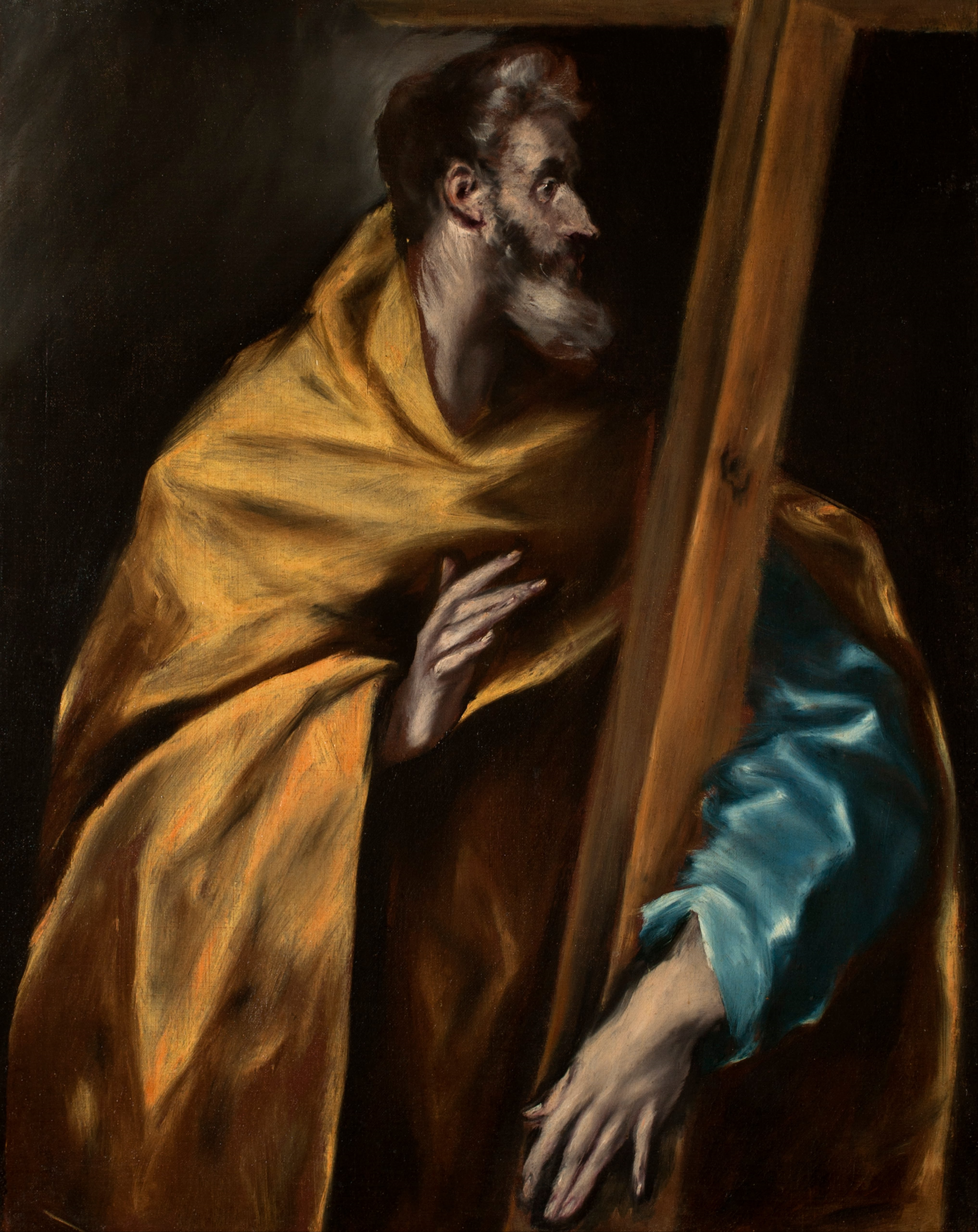
Saint Philip

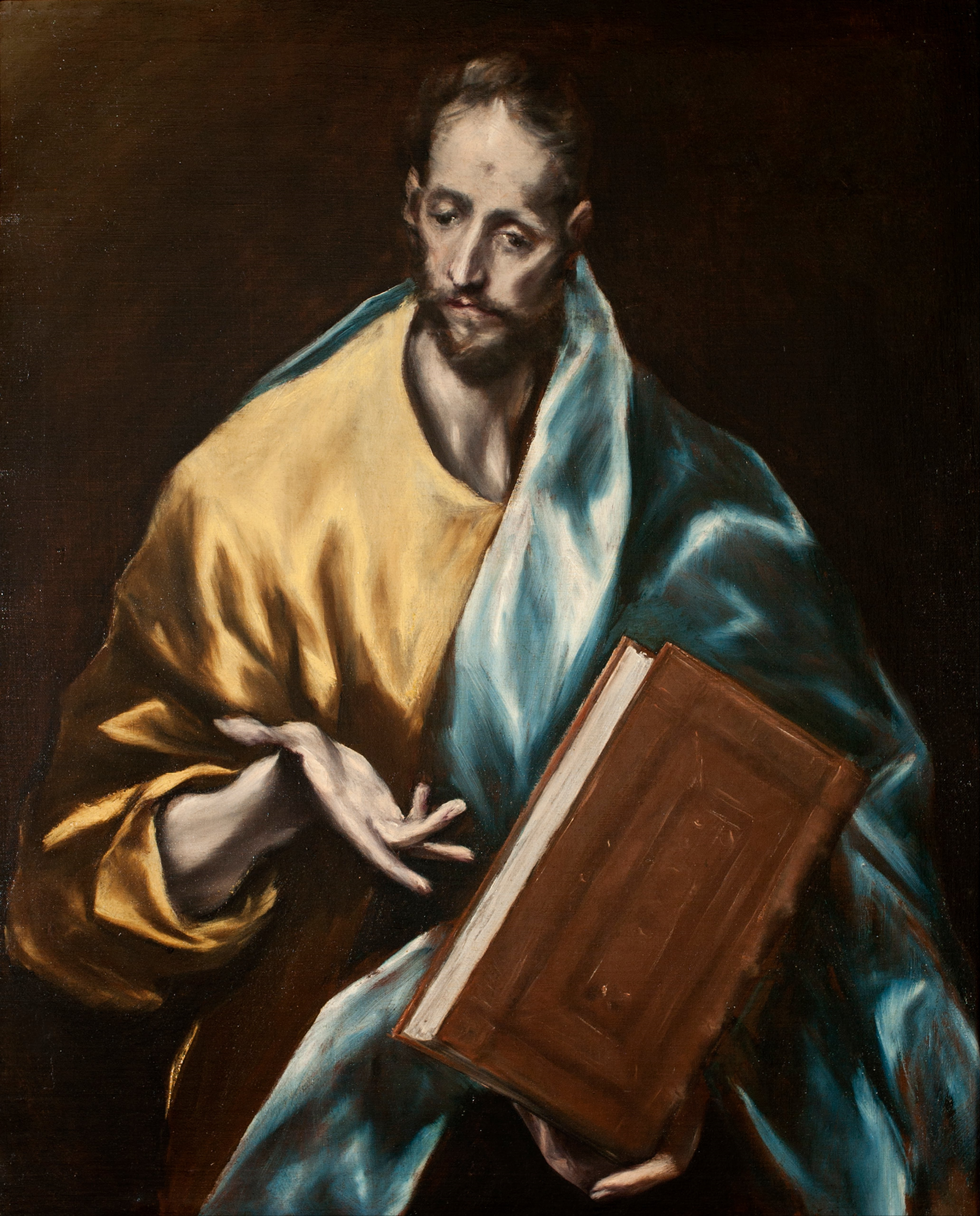
Saint James the Less

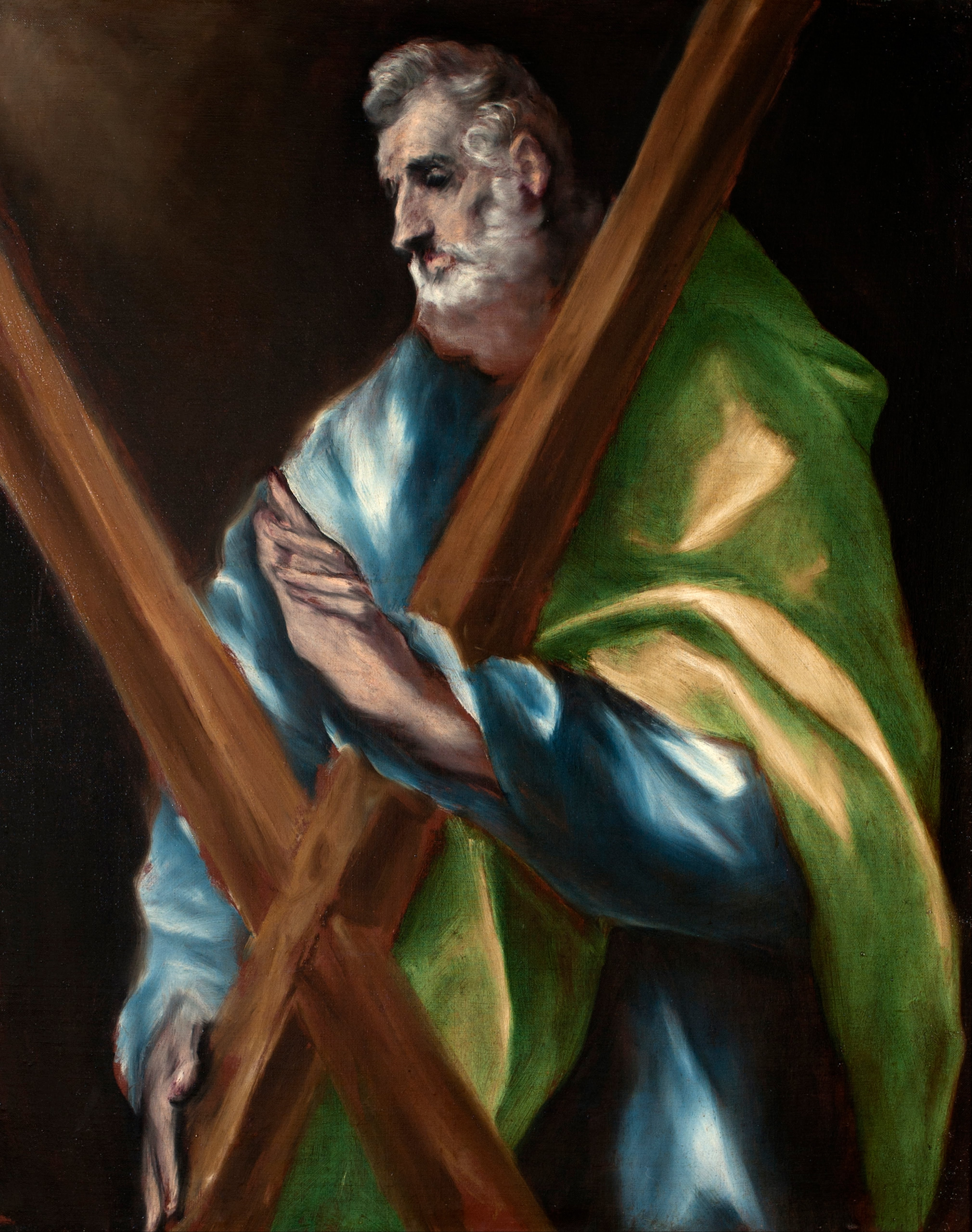
Saint Andrew

Other works

In addition to other works by El Greco the museum has paintings by various Spanish artists.

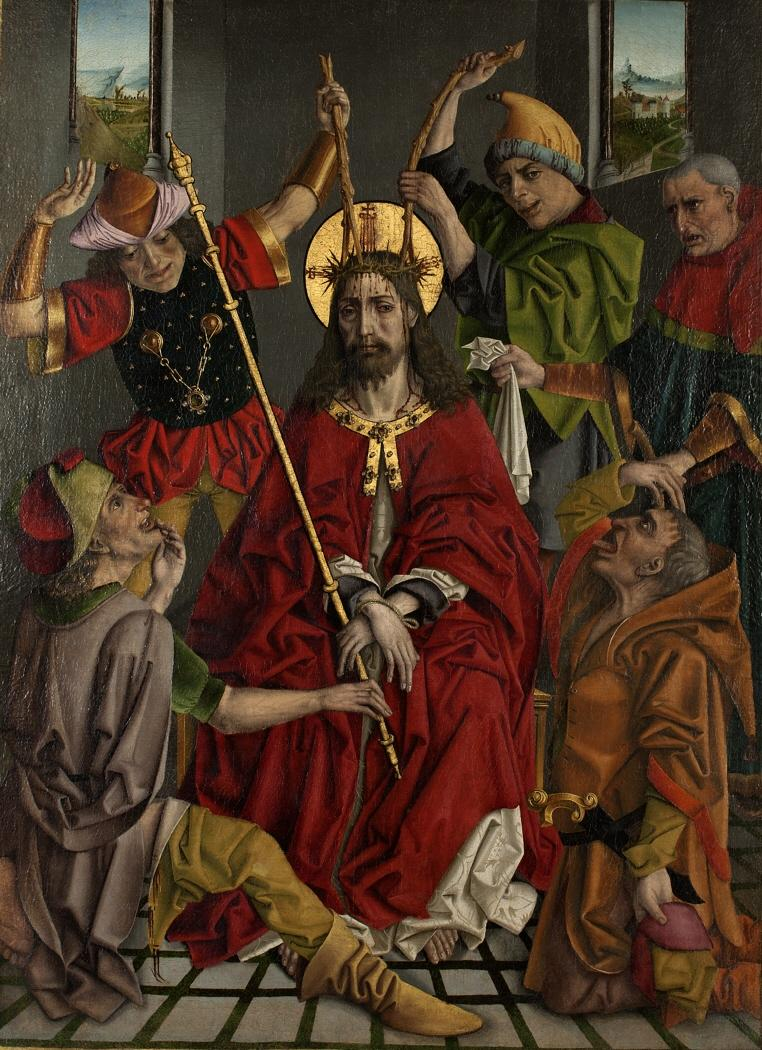
Coronation with Thorns and Abuse, Master of La Sisla, 1450–1510

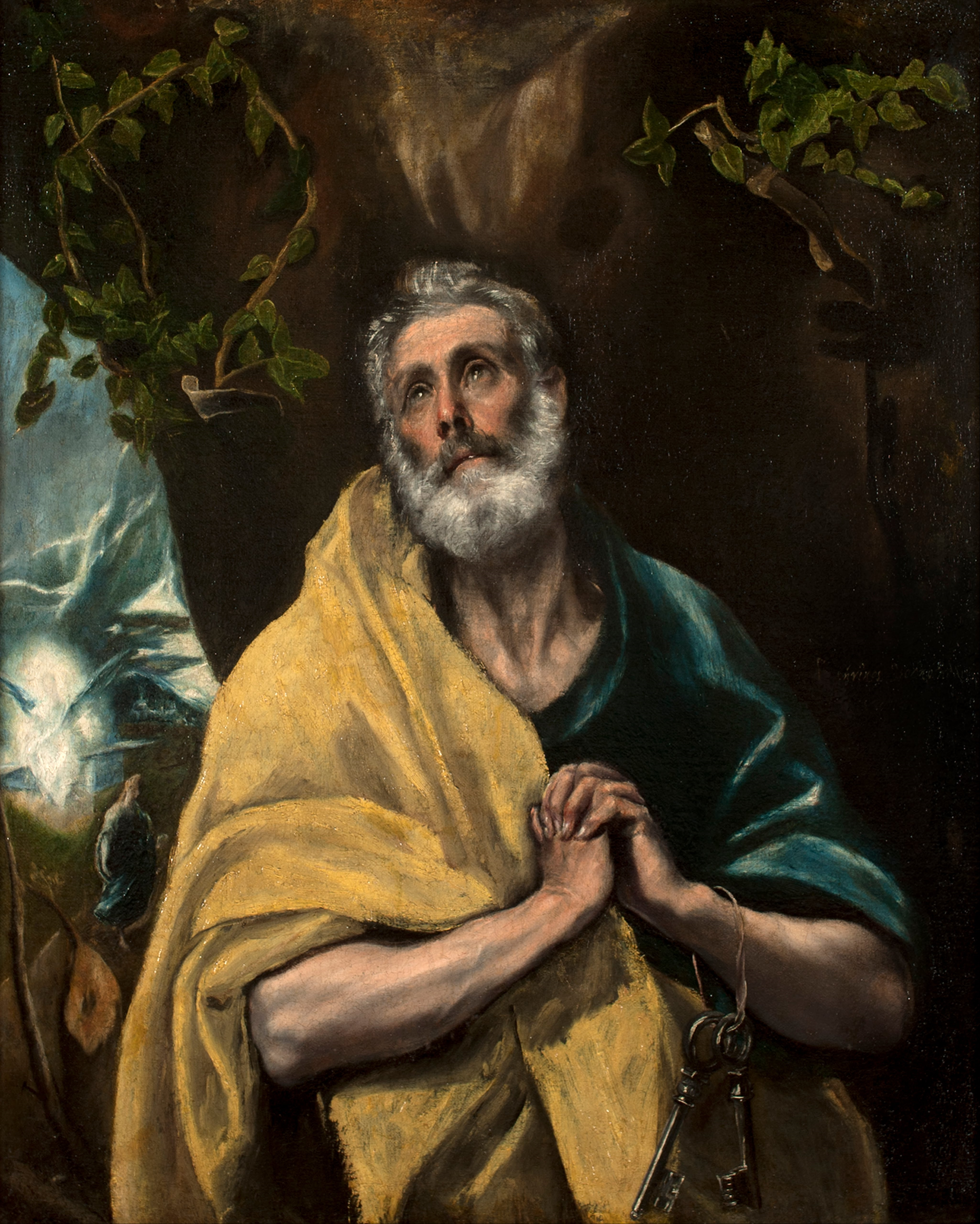
The Tears of Saint Peter, El Greco, 1587–1596

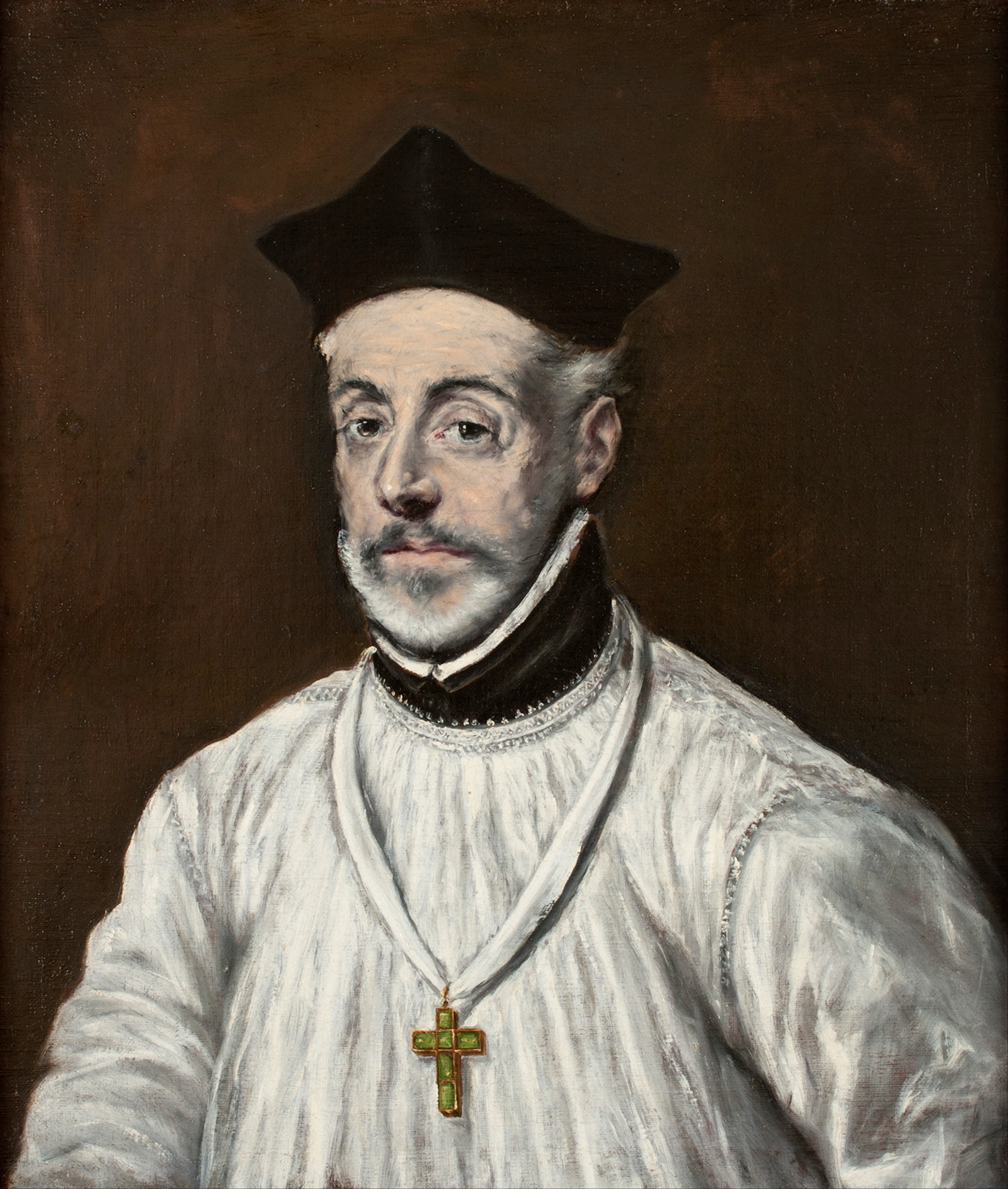
Portrait of Diego de Covarrubias y Leiva, El Greco, 1600

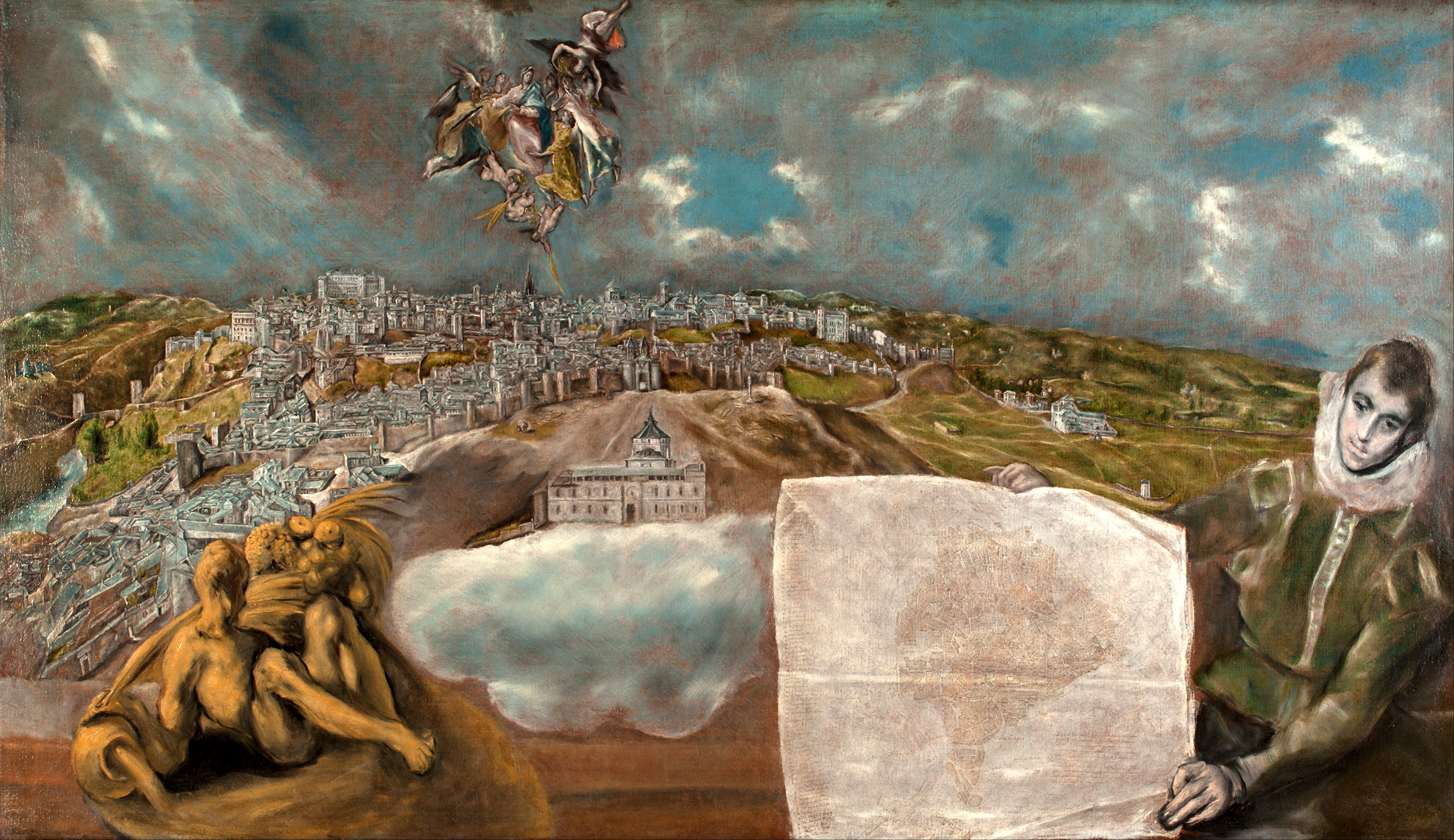
View and Plan of Toledo, El Greco, 1608

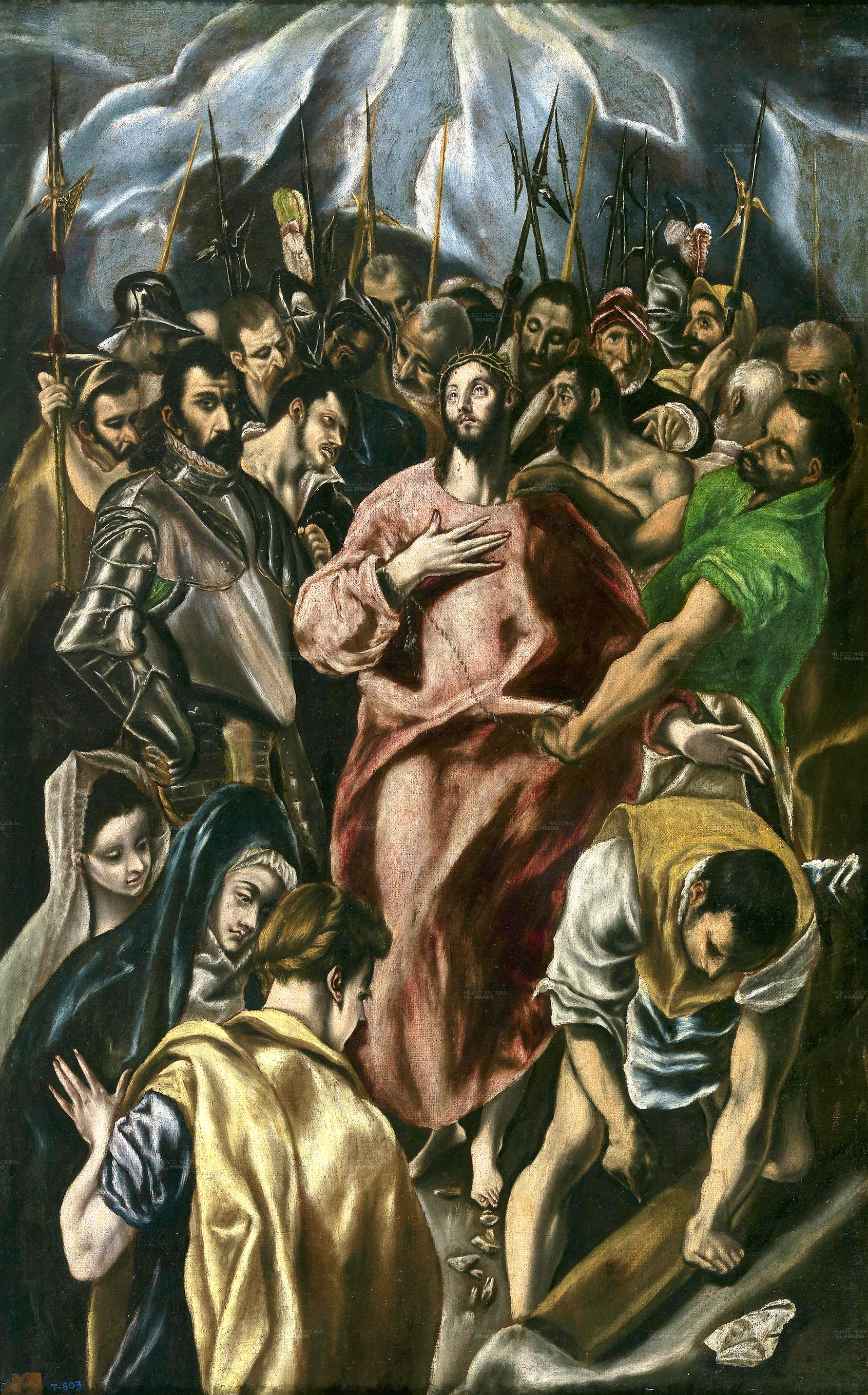
The Disrobing, Jorge Manuel Theotocópuli, c.1606

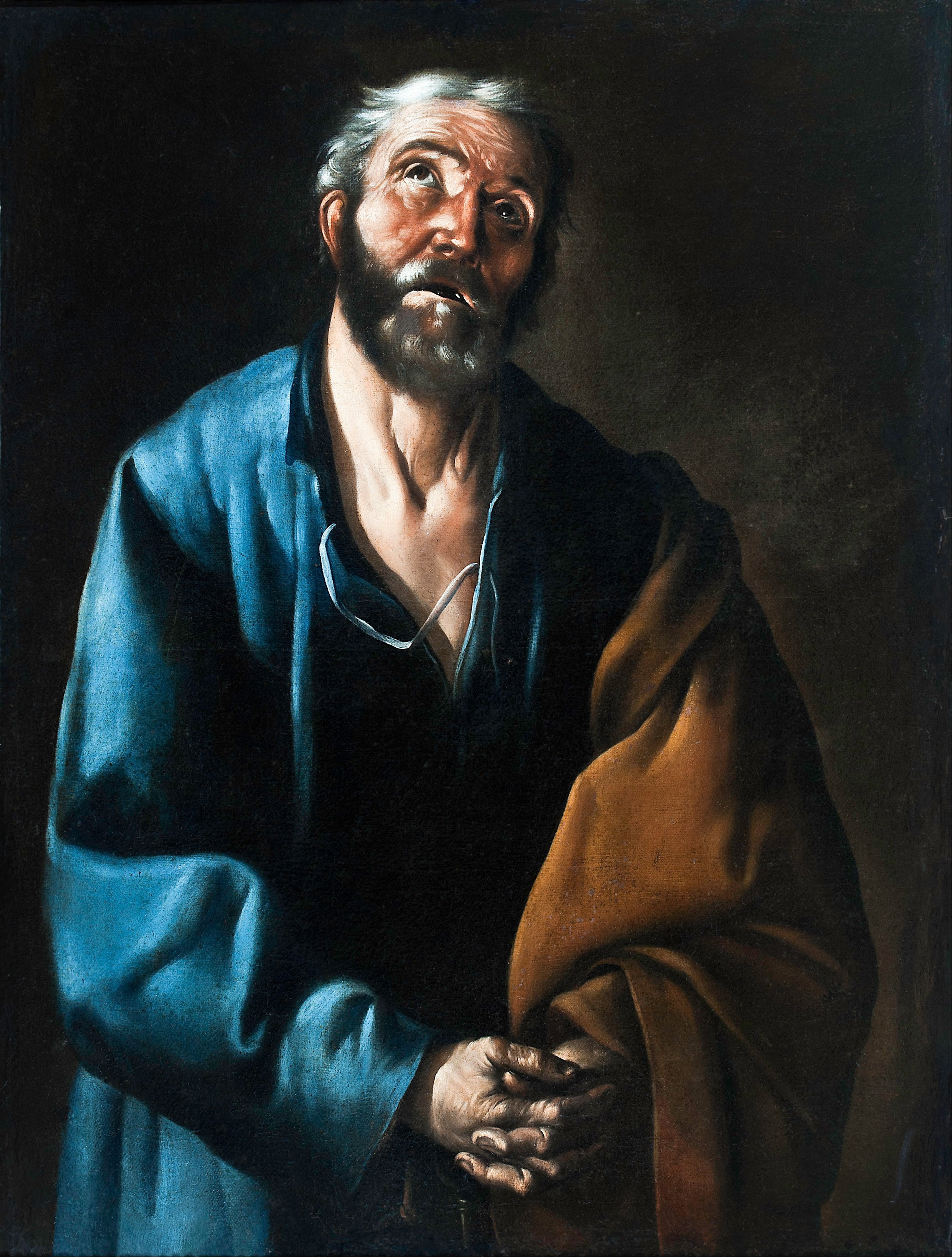
Tears of Saint Peter, Francisco de Zurbarán, c.1633

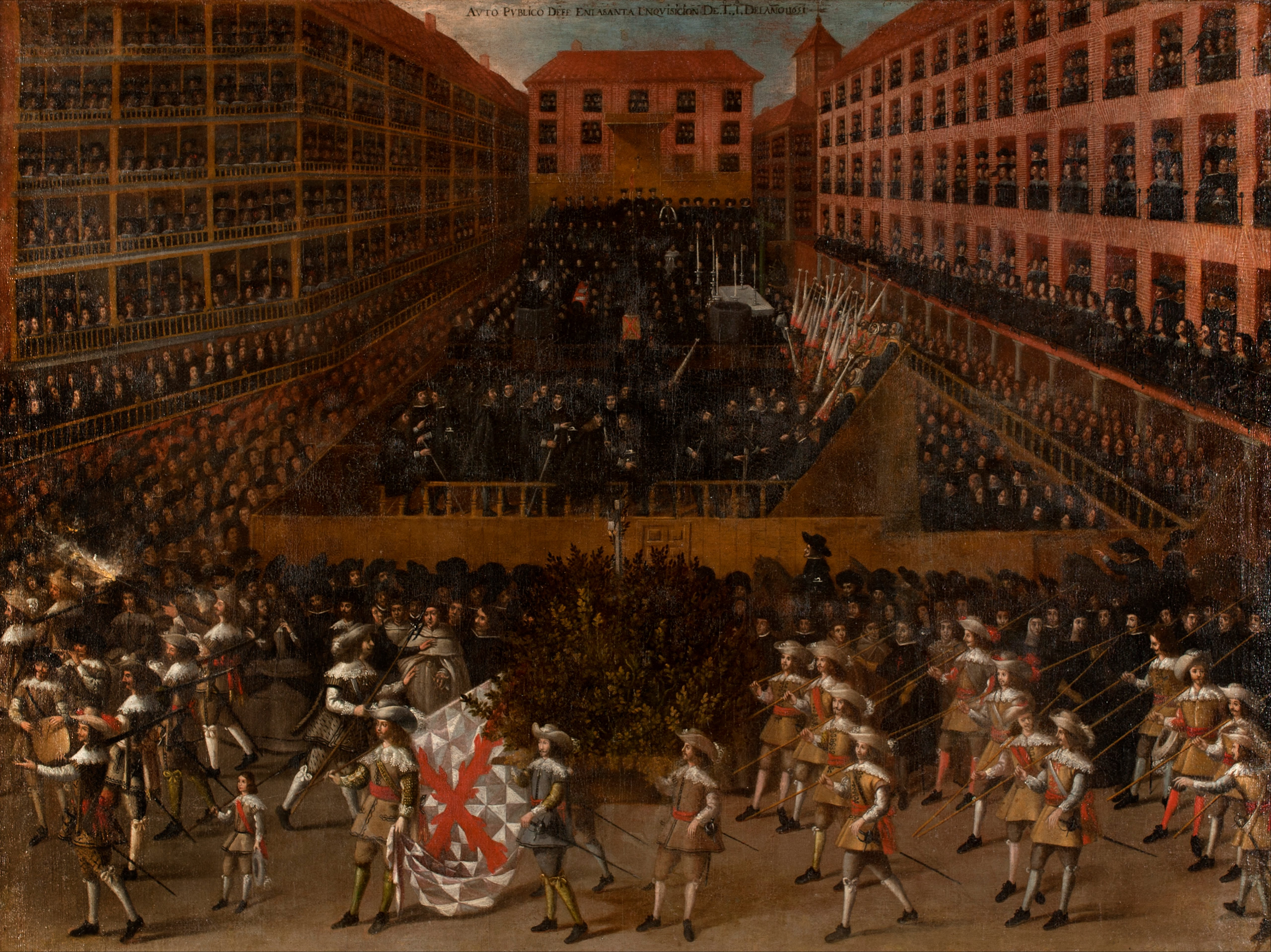
Auto de fé celebrated in the 17th century in a large Spanish public square, Escuela madrileña, 1656

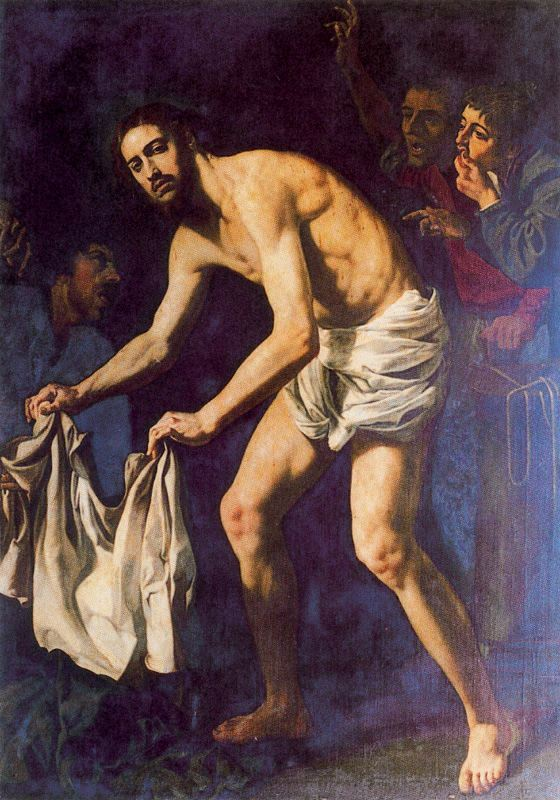
Christ gathering up his robes, Jerónimo Jacinto de Espinosa, 17th century

== See also ==
- Museum of El Greco, Fodele, Crete (birthplace of El Greco)
- List of works by El Greco
- List of single-artist museums
