= Master of La Sisla =

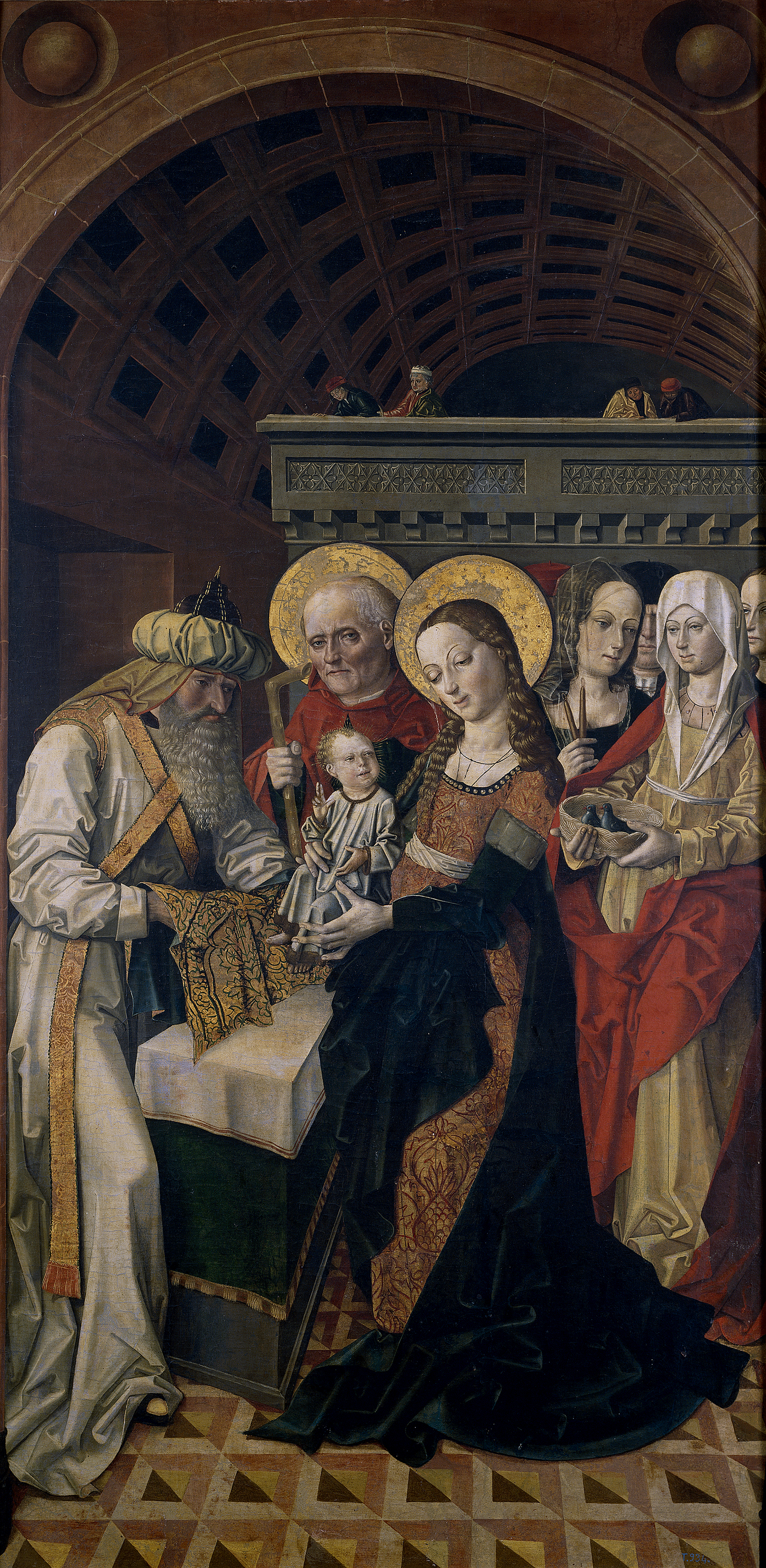
Presentation of Jesus in the Temple, Museo del Prado

The Master of La Sisla (active c.1500) is the name given to an anonymous artist who painted the panels for the altarpiece at the Monastery of Santa María de Sisla, near Toledo, now preserved at the Museo del Prado.

== The panels ==
In the six panels that have been saved (Annunciation, Visitation, Adoration of the Kings, Presentation at the Temple, Circumcision, and the Assumption), some details seem to have been influenced by the works of the Master of Ávila.

The architectural designs appear to have been influenced by the early Renaissance style, together with some Germanic elements; notably the Assumption, which is largely copied from an engraving by Martin Schongauer.

His Annunciation also takes its general lines from Schongauer, but has been given a Spanish flavor by the introduction of local cultural elements; notably two large shoes in the foreground and a carpet with Moorish decorations.

A Christ Crowned with Thorns, at the Museo del Greco, has been attributed to him. The panel, which was previously attributed to Fernando Gallego, displays some features that are also shared by the Master of Ávila, who worked with Gallego.
