= Juan Gregorio Bazán =

Spanish military man

- Coat of arms of Bazán

Lieutenant Governor of Tucumán
- In office 1554–1556
- Monarch: Charles I of Spain
- Preceded by: Francisco de Aguirre
- Succeeded by: Rodrigo de Aguirre

Personal details
- Born: 1510 Province of Toledo, Spain
- Died: August 18, 1570 (aged 59–60) San Salvador de Jujuy, Argentina
- Spouse: Catalina de Plasencia
- Occupation: Politician
- Profession: Army officer

Military service
- Allegiance: Spanish Empire
- Branch/service: Spanish Army
- Rank: Captain

Juan Gregorio Bazán (1510-1570) was a Spanish military man, who served as Conquistador of Peru and Tucumán.

== Biography ==
Bazán was born in 1510 in Talavera de la Reina, Toledo, Castilla–La Mancha, Spain, the son of a distinguished family. He arrived to America, with its relative the Conqueror Francisco de Aguirre.

Bazan lived in several places belonging to the Spanish Empire, including Panama and Chile. In the Peru, he join to the forces of Pablo de Meneses, against Captain Francisco Pizarro. In 1568 he took part of a contingent to explore the area Río Bermejo.

In 1570 Juan Gregorio Bazán traveled ciudad de Los Reyes (Lima), for reunited with his wife Catalina de Placencia, and sons. Return to Chile, he and family were ambushed by the tribes Humaguacas and Puquiles. Bazán dies in the incursion, his wife and children manage to survive after finding refuge in the mountains.

Juan Gregorio Bazán participated in the foundations of Ciudad de Cañete, San Juan Bautista de la Rivera and San Miguel de Tucumán.
