= Judías de El Barco de Ávila =

Judías de El Barco de Ávila (in Spanish)
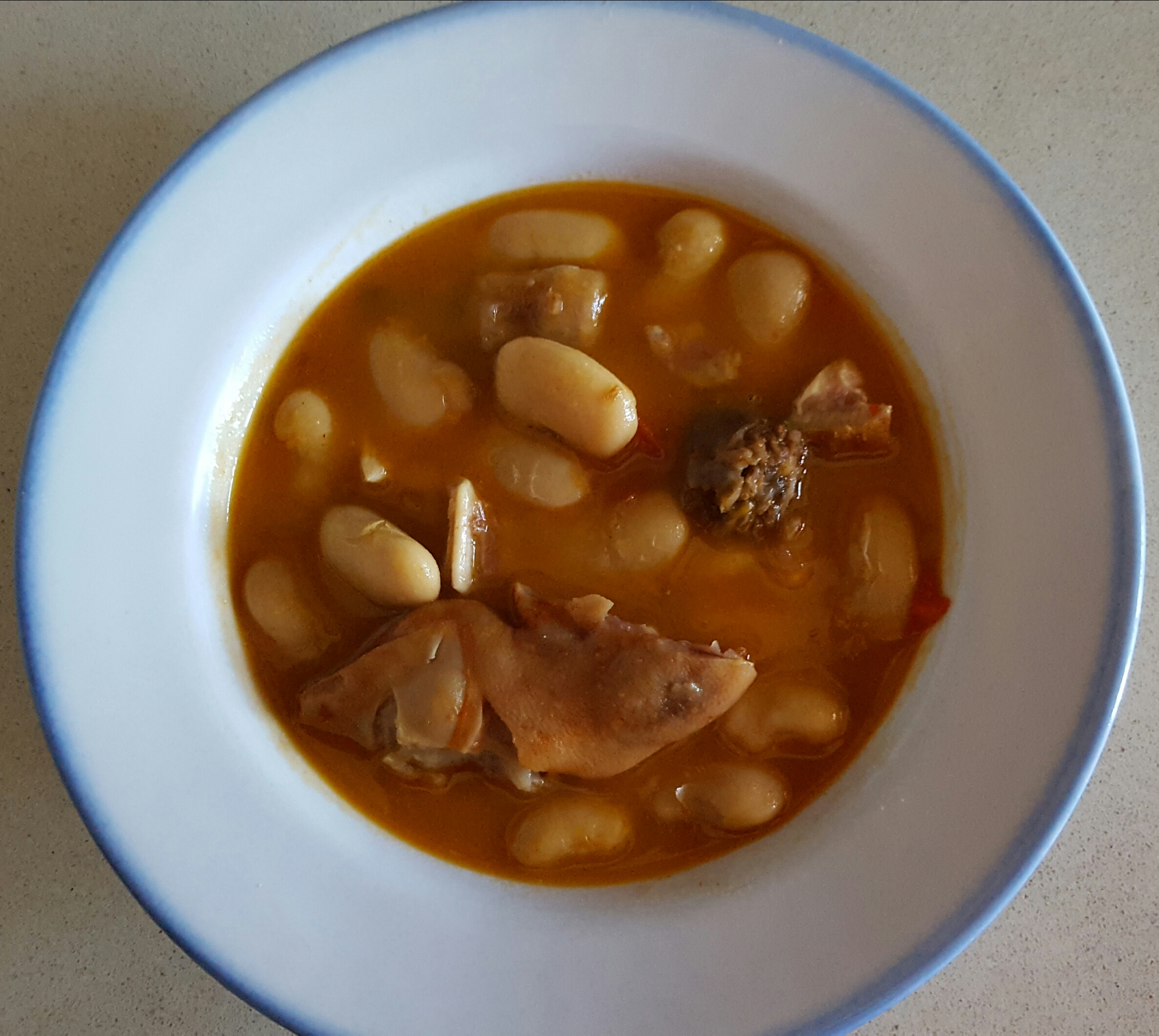
- Beans of El Barco de Ávila
- Course: beans
- Place of origin: Spain
- Region or state: Castile and León
- Serving temperature: hot
- Main ingredients: beans, pig ears, chorizo, pig's trotters
- [[Commons:Category:Judías de El Barco de Ávila|Media: Judías de El Barco de Ávila (in Spanish)]]

Judías de El Barco de Ávila beans from El Barco of Ávila is a protected geographic designation for local bean crops. It was designated on January 5, 1989.

== Beans ==
Barco de Ávila beans (called sometimes more briefly as "Barco beans" or "Judiones from El Barco") are dried beans, usually white and large, cultivated in the fields of El Barco de Ávila (southwest of the Province of Ávila), Spain. Its large size provides approximately forty beans per 100 grams (a portion approximately for one person). Cooked with chorizo, blood sausage (morcilla), bacon or pig ears, it becomes a Spanish traditional food.

== Location ==
The area of production from El Barco include the land located in the municipal terms of the agricultural region of Barco-Piedrahíta. Beans are grown on the terraces of the valleys, protected from winds. They are marketed under two categories "first" and "extra".

== Care and handling suggestions ==
From a leading distributor:

- Store beans in a dry and cool place, less than 12 °C.
- Soak in cold water 12 hours before cooking (with a ratio of water to beans 3:1).
- Where the waters are very alkaline, especially in coastal areas, use mineral water for both soaking and cooking.
- Legumes increase their volume as they are cooked so be sure there is excess room in the cooking container.
- Do not add salt until they are practically cooked.
- During cooking, avoid stirring with a spoon, instead gently shaking the cookpot or dish to preserve the beans whole shape.
- Cook for 90 to 120 minutes.
- Bean stews are better if left to rest a few hours before tasting them.
