= Francisco de Aguirre (conquistador) =

Spanish conquistador

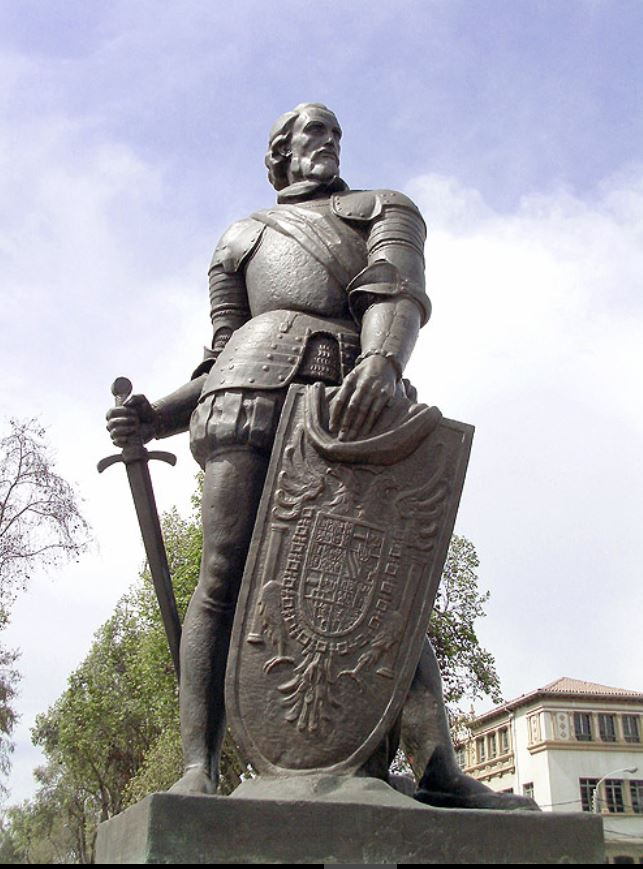

Royal Governor of Tucumán
- In office 1553–1555
- Monarch: Charles V
- Preceded by: none
- Succeeded by: Jerónimo Luis de Cabrera

Personal details
- Born: c. 1507 Talavera de la Reina, Spain
- Died: 1581 La Serena, Chile
- Spouse: María de Torres

Francisco de Aguirre (Spanish pronunciation: [fɾanˈθisko ðe aˈɣire]; 1507–1581) was a Spanish conquistador who participated in the conquest of Peru, Bolivia, Chile and Argentina.

== Early life ==
Francisco de Aguirre was the son of Hernando de la Rúa and of Constanza de Meneses. He joined the army of Carlos I, participating in the Battle of Pavia and the assault on Rome in 1527. While in Rome as an Alférez in 1517, he was charged with the protection of a convent and as a reward, the Pope allowed him to marry his cousin, María de Torres y Meneses, while the King appointed him Corregidor of Talavera de la Reina.

He moved to Peru in 1536, with a large retinue that included slaves and servants. He was part of the relief expedition that saved Gonzalo Pizarro, who was under siege in Cochabamba, and between 1538 and 1539 he participated in the conquest of the province of Charcas, in present-day Bolivia, under the command of Diego de Rojas.

== In Chile ==
When he heard that Pedro de Valdivia was on his way to conquer Chile in 1540, he moved his troops (composed of 15 horsemen and 10 foot soldiers) to Tarapacá, where he waited for two months in order to join him. Aguirre quickly became a close confidant of Valdivia and achieved a premier place in the new colony, being named one of the Alcaldes of the first settlement of Santiago and being severely injured in the defense of the city on 11 September 1541, when local Indians led by Michimalonco destroyed it.

=== Lieutenant governor ===
On 20 June 1549 Aguirre was appointed lieutenant governor of the zone between the Atacama Desert and the Choapa River, charged with the reconstruction of La Serena, which had been destroyed by Indians from the north. He was chosen for this task since he had already demonstrated a strong hand in the war against the Indians and their resulting punishment. On 29 August 1549 Aguirre refounded the city, constructing a fort for its defense. He then led his troops out in persecution of the Indians. The north of Chile would remain free of danger from then on, although somewhat depopulated and deficient in labor.

In 1552 the Lieutenant General of La Serena, Aguirre took possession of Tucumán, on the other side of the Andes, after disputing the claim of Juan Núñez de Prado, who did not recognize the authority of Valdivia. There, after a series of exploratory expeditions, he founded the city of Santiago del Estero del Nuevo Maestrazgo on 25 July 1553 (although some historians consider that its real foundation was in 1550).

=== Dispute with Villagra ===
When Valdivia died in the Battle of Tucapel, his will was opened and found to designate Aguirre in the absence of Jerónimo de Alderete. When he received the news, he was in Tucumán, and Francisco de Villagra had already managed to be acknowledged as governor, due to the death of Alderete and the absence of Aguirre.

Apprised of the situation by his friends in La Serena, he immediately returned there, where he was welcomed as Captain General and Governor of Chile. He communicated his arrival to the Cabildo (town council) of Santiago, letting it be known that the troops under his command were prepared to maintain his position, which was his by right of Valdivia's will. The Cabildo of Santiago, however, refused to acknowledge the declaration, disarming the contingent of troops under Aguirre's brother Hernando which had been sent to deliver it. The conflict was finally resolved when a petition was sent to the Audiencia in Lima, which determined that the council had to submit to the command for six months, after which the viceroy Andrés Hurtado de Mendoza, 3rd Marquis of Cañete would designate a new governor. If the term expired, Villagra would be the governor, in command of the army of the south. Aguirre wanted to ignore the verdict, but his forces were too small to match Villagra's if there was a confrontation, so he accepted it bitterly.

In 1557 the viceroy's son García Hurtado de Mendoza arrived as the newly designated governor. One of his first actions was to have Aguirre and Villagra arrested, despite their courteous behavior in front of him.

== Governor of Tucumán ==
Aguirre's imprisonment in Peru was not appreciated by the King and his advisers, and in 1562 the Viceroy of Peru Diego López de Zúñiga appointed him as Governor of the province of Tucumán, who was at the point of being lost to a general uprising of the local population. In 1564, when the conquest of this region was at the point of being reversed, Aguirre returned it again to Spanish domination.

During his mandate, a rebellion was fomented by Jerónimo de Holguín, which concluded with the capture of Aguirre. Freed later, he was indicted by the ecclesiastical authority of Charcas for having made heretical statements.

The constant turmoils of his administration motivated the viceroy to remove Aguirre from his post, naming in his place Jerónimo Luis de Cabrera. In 1576, Aguirre returned to Chile and settled modestly in La Serena, where he was held in respect until his death in 1581.

== Additional information ==
=== See also ===
- Pedro de Valdivia
- Francisco de Villagra
- Jerónimo de Alderete
- Diego de Rojas
- Inés de Suárez
- Arauco War
- Mapuche people

=== Sources ===
- Ercilla, Alonso de. La Araucana (in Spanish). Eswikisource.
- Góngora Marmolejo, Alonso de (1960). Historia de Todas las Cosas que han Acaecido en el Reino de Chile y de los que lo han gobernado (1536–1575). Crónicas del Reino de Chile (in Spanish). Madrid, Spain: Atlas. pp. 75–224.
- Mariño de Lobera, Pedro (1960). Fr. Bartolomé de Escobar (ed.). Crónica del Reino de Chile, escrita por el capitán Pedro Mariño de Lobera... reducido a nuevo método y estilo por el Padre Bartolomé de Escobar (1593). Crónicas del Reino de Chile (in Spanish). Madrid, Spain: Atlas. pp. 227–562.
- Medina, José Toribio (1906). Diccionario Biográfico Colonial de Chile (PDF) (in Spanish). Santiago, Chile: Imprenta Elzeviriana. pp. 18–30.
- Valdivia, Pedro de (1960). Cartas. Crónicas del Reino de Chile (in Spanish). Madrid, Spain: Atlas. pp. 1–74.
- Vivar, Jerónimo de (1987). Crónica y relación copiosa y verdadera de los reinos de Chile (1558) (in Spanish). Madrid, Spain: ARTEHISTORIA REVISTA DIGITAL.

Government offices
Preceded by none	Royal Governor of Tucumán; 1553–1555	Succeeded by Jerónimo Luis de Cabrera
