= Jerónimo Luis de Cabrera =

Spanish conquistador

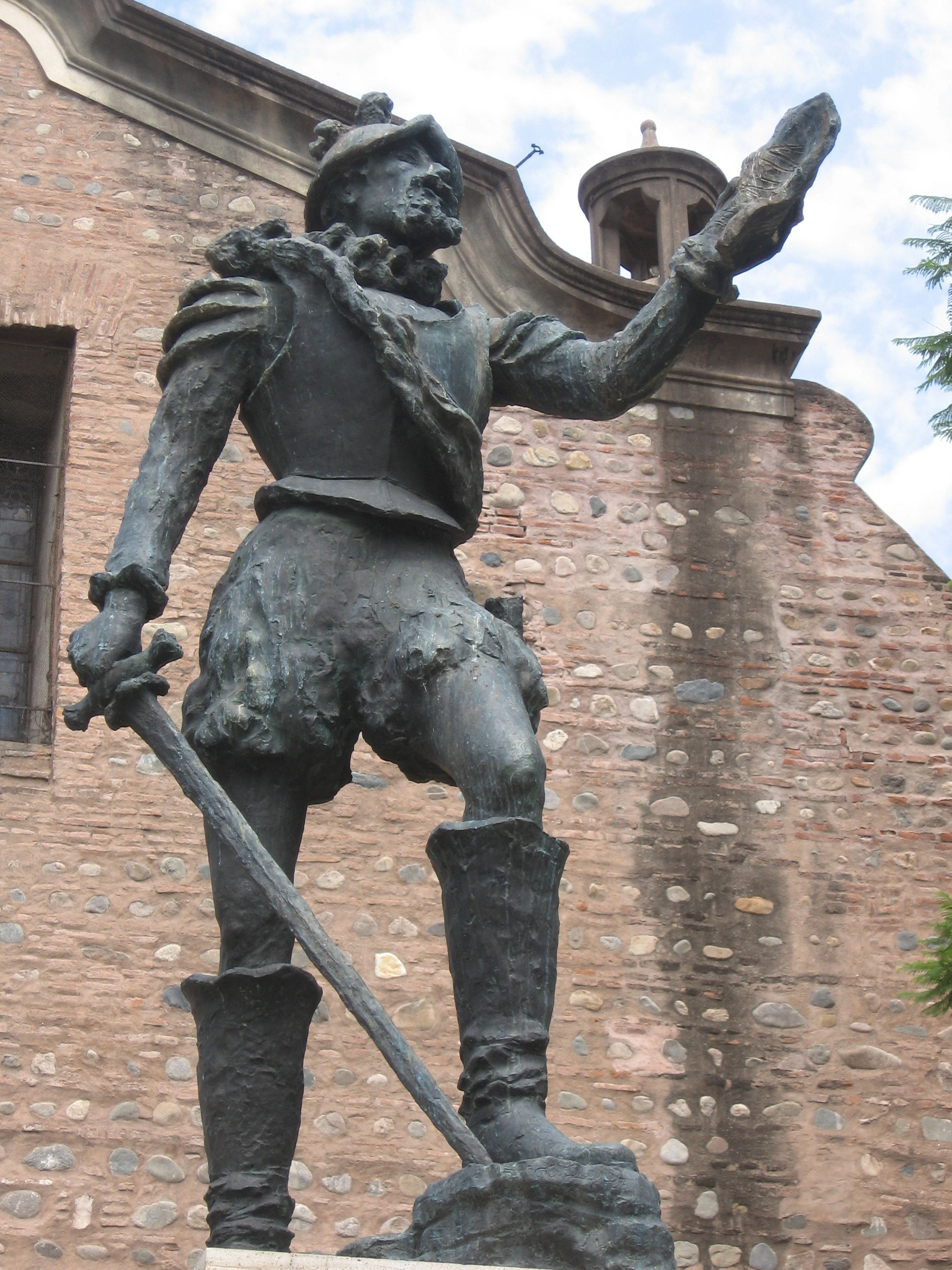
- Monument to Jerónimo Luis de Cabrera
- Born: 1520; Sevilla, Spain
- Died: 17 August 1574 (aged 53–54); Santiago del Estero, Viceroyalty of Peru (Present-day Argentina)
- Military career
- Allegiance: Spain
- Rank: Conquistador

Jerónimo Luis de Cabrera (1528 – 17 August 1574) was a Spanish conquistador, early colonial governor over much of what today is northwestern Argentina, and founder of the city of Córdoba.

== Life and times ==
Cabrera was born in Seville, Spain, in 1528. He and an older brother, Pedro, migrated to the Viceroyalty of Perú in 1538, and following his enlistment in the Spanish Army, Jerónimo was eventually made a sergeant and stationed in the colonial nerve center of Cuzco, in 1549. He led numerous military campaigns in subsequent years, notably among them the suppression of revolts in Ica and Nazca, and following a post in the capital, Lima, he was appointed in 1571 corregidor of Potosí.

Towards the end of 1571, Cabrera was designated adelantado for the purpose of exploring uncharted territories south of Potosí. The commission was followed by his appointment as governor of Tucumán Province, which then covered most of what later became the Argentine Northwest. Stationing his office in Santiago del Estero, he organized an expedition of 100 soldiers and 40 supply wagons during 1572, and parted towards the south with the intention of creating a strategic foothold. An initial settlement, Quisquisacate, failed within days of its 24 June 1573 establishment, and on 6 July the expedition chose a location on the banks of the Suquía River, around 250 mi (400 km) south of Santiago de Estero. Given the privilege of naming the settlement, Cabrera named it Córdoba de la Nueva Andalucía, in honor of his wife's birthplace.

Cabrera enjoyed relatively good relations with the area's native inhabitants, the Comechingones, and proved an able administrator of the new settlement, which within a year counted with the basic legal and administrative institutions of a stable village. He departed towards the east on his own initiative in 1574 and quickly reached the shores of the Paraná River, over 200 mi (320 km) away, establishing the Fort of San Luis (near what today is Santa Fe, Argentina). Founding the Viceroyalty of Perú's first viable beach-head towards the Atlantic Ocean (via the highly-navigable Paraná), the feat met with the rivalry of Captain Juan de Garay, who had been sent down the river from Asunción with orders from the Viceroy to do the same.

The ensuing dispute was judged by an official arbiter, Gonzalo de Abreu, who found Cabrera guilty of insubordination to the Viceroy (an infraction punishable by death). Spared being garroted on account of his being born to Spanish nobility, Cabrera was taken to Lima, where he was executed by decapitation on 17 August 1574.
