= Diego de Roxas =

Spanish conquistador

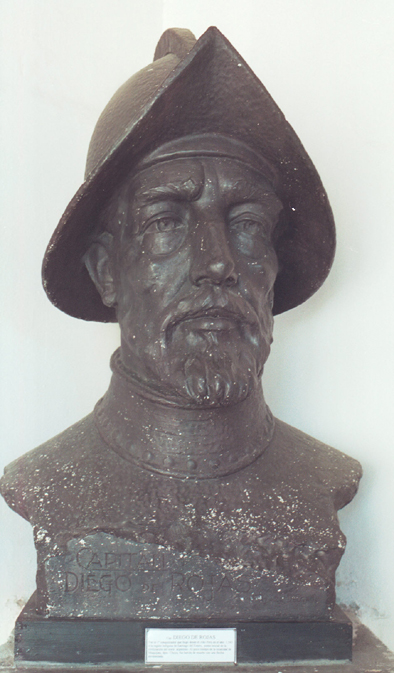
- Born: 1500; Burgos, Spain
- Died: 1543 (aged 42–43); Santiago del Estero, Argentina
- Military career
- Allegiance: Spain
- Rank: Captain

Diego de Roxas or Rojas (1500–1543) was a Spanish soldier, explorer, and conquistador of Central America and South America.

== Biography ==
Born 1500 in Burgos. Since arriving in America, Roxas was in charge of dangerous missions of explorations the rivers, in the border of Guatemala and Mexico, Roxas was accompanied by Aborigines of the area. Then he participated in the conquest of El Salvador. In 1536, the Conquistador Diego de Roxas, came to Peru, one of his first missions were under the orders of Governor Cristóbal Vaca de Castro, he demanded the exploration of land south of the region. In 1538 Roxas was Governor of the Province of Charcas, and is designated by Francisco Pizarro, for on a mission of exploration in the Gran Chaco. In 1543 Diego de Roxas, discovered what is now the Ciudad de Córdoba. Roxas participated in the wars against the fearsome tribe Calchaquíes, while he was exploring the puna jujeña, Roxas was murdered in a brawl, which occurred in Santiago del Estero.

Their descendants the General Diego de Roxas y Caravantes was Corregidor in the cities of Cordoba and Mendoza, and Marcos de Roxas Caravantes was Alcalde in Chile. Salvador de Rojas was Captain of militia and resident of Córdoba.
