= El Barco de Ávila =

Municipality in the province of Ávila, Spain

- Municipality
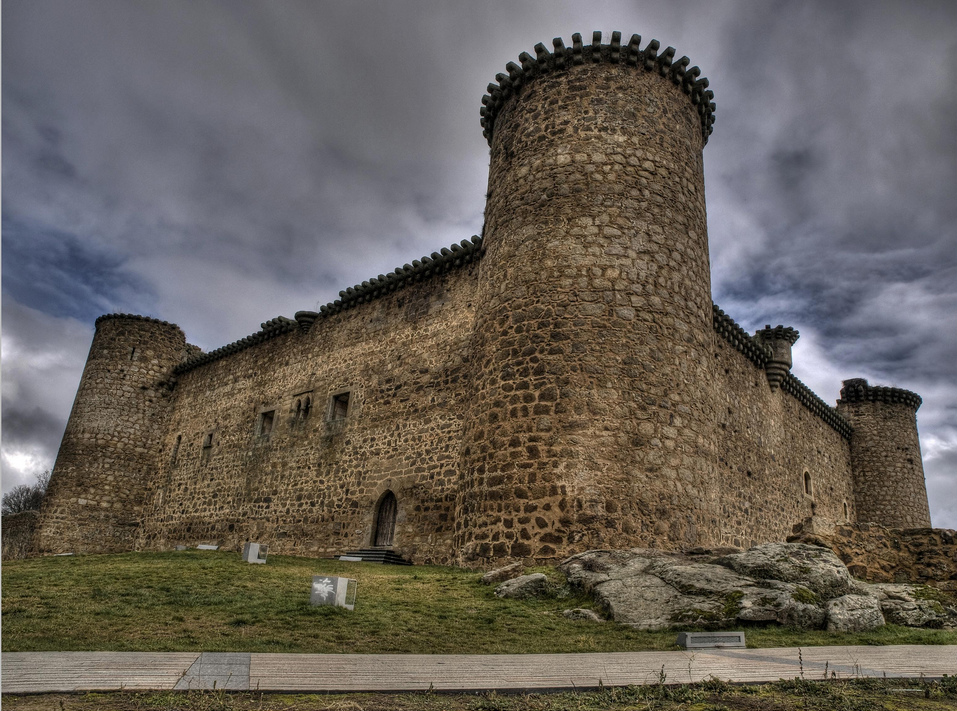
- Castle of El Barco de Ávila, built in the 12th century.

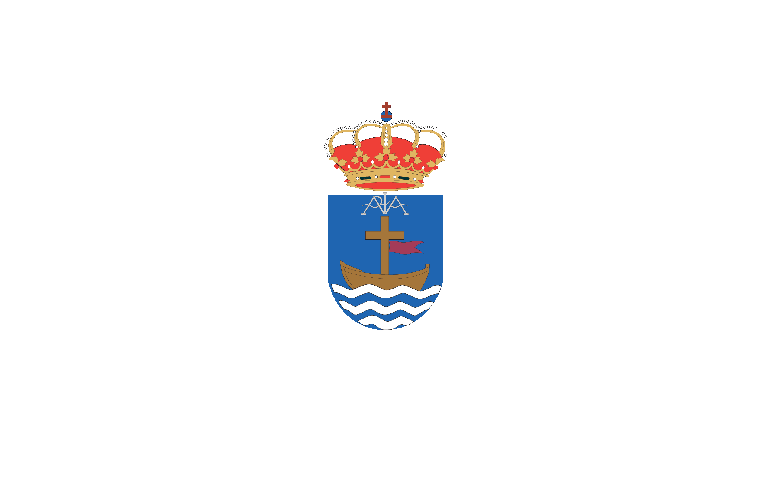
- Flag Coat of arms

- Location in Spain. El Barco de Ávila (Spain)
- Coordinates: 40°21′35″N 5°31′25″W
- Country: Spain
- Autonomous community: Castile and León
- Province: Ávila
- Comarca: El Barco de Ávila - Piedrahíta

Government
  - Mayor: María de Loreto Yuste Ribera (PSOE)

Area
  - Total: 12.68 km^{2} (4.90 sq mi)
- Elevation: 1,009 m (3,310 ft)

Population (2025-01-01)
  - Total: 2,308
  - Density: 182.0/km^{2} (471.4/sq mi)
- Demonym: Barcenses
- Time zone: UTC+1 (CET)
  - Summer (DST): CEST
- Website: Official website

El Barco de Ávila is a municipality located in the province of Ávila, Castile and León, Spain. It forms part of the region of El Barco de Ávila - Piedrahíta, and is located in the valley of Tormes River, and is the headboard of the natural region of Alto Tormes.

== Place names and symbols ==
El Barco may take its name from a boat used to cross the river or, as different authors think, from different words of different languages: bar (in Hebrew house), from the Basque bartzea or meeting between villages, from the Celtic house.

== Location ==
El Barco de Ávila is located at the southwest of the province of Avila, near the frontier of the provinces of Salamanca and Caceres, being the headboard of the region between the valley of the Tormes river and Aravalles river, better known as Alto Tormes. This municipality is located on an altitude of 1004 msnm. It has an area of 12,68 km^{2}. It borders La Carrera, El Losar del Barco, San Lorenzo del Tormes and Navatejares.

== Population ==
Historical population
| Year | Pop. | ±% p.a. |
|---|---|---|
| 2023 | 2,276 | — |
| 2024 | 2,297 | +0.92% |
| 2025 | 2,308 | +0.48% |
Source: INE

== Climate ==
El Barco de Ávila has a warm climate with a dry and warm summer according to the climatic classification of Köppen.

== Main sights ==
- Castle (12th century, rebuilt in the 14th century)
- Casa del Reloj
- Romanesque bridge
- Hermitage of Santísimo Cristo del Caño
- Hermitage of San Pedro de El Barco
- 12th century walls

== See also ==
- Judías de El Barco de Ávila beans
