= Alonso de Reinoso =

Spanish conquistador (1518–1567)

Alonso de Reinoso (or Reynoso) (1518–1567) was a Spanish Conquistador in Honduras, Mexico, Peru and Chile. He was born in Torrijos Toledo, Spain in 1518. He was married to Catalina Flores de Riofrío before he came to the Americas in 1535.

== Life ==
He first disembarked in Cartagena de Indias in Colombia but soon moved on and fought for twelve years in Honduras and the Yucatán Peninsula with Pedro de Alvarado and Francisco de Montejo and was one of the first Alcaldes of the new city of Mérida. Leaving Mérida he went to fight in Peru for two years until he met Francisco de Villagra who was recruiting more men for Pedro de Valdivias campaign in Araucanía.

In 1551, he came to Chile with Francisco de Villagra. An experienced soldier he soon became Corregidor of the city of Angol in 1554 after the death of Valdivia. Francisco de Villagra then appointed him as maestre de campo for his army in 1554. After fighting in the Battle of Marihueñu, he survived the defeat and evacuation of Concepcion. Returning to Santiago, he supported Villagra against the attempt of Francisco de Aguirre to become governor of Chile.

Under the new governor García Hurtado de Mendoza Reinoso was made a Captain of Cavalry and fought in the Battle of Lagunillas and Battle of Millarapue. Moving into the Tucapel region he broke up an assembly of Mapuche in Cayucupil with a night march and morning surprise attack. Soon afterward near the valley of Purén, Reinoso rescued a column under Pedro de Avendaño from a Mapuche ambush.

Mendoza appointed him as the Corregidor of his new town of Cañete de la Frontera when he began his expedition to the south. Attempting to throw off the Spanish occupation Caupolicán attacked the fort of Cañete expecting the gates to be opened by the treachery of a yanakuna within but he was betrayed instead. Reinoso took advantage of the opportunity to lure the toqui Caupolican into a trap in the city and destroyed his army.

Later Reinoso found an Indian who led his subordinate Pedro de Avendaño into the mountains during the night and on February 5, 1558, captured Caupolican. Returned to Cañete Reinoso saw to the Toqui's execution by impalement. This measure did not stop the Mapuche revolt and they fortified Quiapo. Mendoza returned and with Reinoso captured the fort and destroyed the army defending it in the Battle of Quiapo. Afterward, Reinoso carried out the punishment of the prisoners taken in the battle, seven hundred were hanged without mercy on the battlefield.

In the middle of January 1559, Alonso de Reinoso was elevated to the rank of maestre de campo by Mendoza who left him in charge of all the troops south of the Bio Bio River. From 1559 he lived in the city of Concepcion where he was named as its Cabildos Alcalde Ordinario and its Corregidor. He continued as the maestre de campo for Mendoza's successor the new governor Francisco de Villagra.

He died, drowned in a shipwreck near the city of Concepción in 1567, escorting the new oidores of the new Real Audiencia of Chile to the city.

== Sources ==
- José Toribio Medina, Colección de documentos inéditos para la historia de Chile desde el viaje de Magallanes hasta la batalla de Maipo, 1518-1818, Tomo VII, Imprenta Ercilla, Santiago, 1895
  - 6 de Octubre de 1542 XXI. — Información de los servicios que hizo en la conquista de Higueras y Honduras Alonso de Reinoso, en compañía del adelantado D. Francisco de Montejo y Pedro de Alvarado. (Archivo de Indias, Patronato, 1-2-3/23.)
- Diego Barros Arana, Historia jeneral de Chile, Tomo I, R. Jover, Santiago, 1884 Original from Oxford University, Digitized Nov 2, 2007
