= Turcupichun =

Turcupichun was the toqui of the Mapuche Aillarehues in the vicinity of Concepcion, Chile and the Bio-Bio River valley from 1557 to 1558. García Hurtado de Mendoza landed in early June 1557 on the island of La Quiriquina at the mouth of the bay of San Pedro. Soon afterward he sent out messengers to the local Aillarehues to come and submit to the Spanish. Turcupichun gathered them in a great coyag where he advocated resistance to the death and elected him as their toqui replacing the dead Lautaro.

Turcupichun led his army to build a pucara on the height of Andalicán five leagues south of Concepcion covering the approach down the coast to Arauco and posted detachments to cover the crossing points on the Bio Bio River. Governor Mendoza deceived him by having a detachment build rafts at one of these crossing points but using the boats of his fleet to carry his army across at the mouth of the river. Turcupichun then engaged and was defeated by the army of Mendoza in the Battle of Lagunillas. Following this defeat his army fell back and joined with Caupolicán to fight in the Battle of Millarapue. Following the battle Turcupichun was blamed by Caupolican, for the defeat when his third division marching to attack the Spanish rear did not arrive in time. Angry at the accusation he withdrew to defend his own lands.

Following the execution of Caupolican, Turcupichun attempted to organize a new revolt and an attack on Concepcion, but the Spanish Corregidor of the city, Gerónimo de Villegas discovered his attempt and sent Juan Galiano with some soldiers to attack him first. Moving to where he was lodged at night Galiano captured him and some of his companions and returned with them to the city where he was hung in the plaza. After his death his army elected Lemucaguin as his successor.

== Sources ==
- Diego de Rosales, “Historia General del Reino de Chile”, Flandes Indiano, 3 tomos. Valparaíso 1877 - 1878.
  - Historia general de el Reyno de Chile: Flandes Indiano, Tomo II (1554-1625)
    - Capitulo XII Da fondo en el puerto de la Concepción, levanta un fuerte, tiene varios sucessos con los indios y embíale embajada Caupolican.
    - Capitulo XIII. Como passó a Biobio, entró en Arauco, y la victoria que tubo en el camino de veinte mil indios.
    - Capitulo XIV. Batalla que tubo Don Garcia con Caupolican y Turcupichun y insigne Victoria que alcanzó.
    - Capitulo XVII. Embia Don Garcia a reedificar la ciudad de la Concepción. Passa a la Imperial y en su ausencia tiene una gran victoria de Caupolican el Maestro de campo Reynoso, y danle muchos la paz.
    - Capitulo XVIII. Como pobló Don Garcia la ciudad de Osorno y las de Cañete y Villarica; llega hasta Chiloé, y vuélvese a la Imperial.
    - Capitulo XXI. Como los indios aprendieron a disparar arcabuzes y hizieron un fuerte en Quiapo; gánansele los españoles y dan la paz al vencedor Don Garcia.
