= Pedro de Avendaño =

Pedro de Avendaño (1529-1561) was a Spanish-Basque soldier who fought in the Arauco War. He was known for capturing the Mapuche leader Caupolicán in 1558. Avendaño was later killed by the Mapuches in 1561.

Avendaño was born around 1529 in the Biscay province of Spain. He arrived in Chile in 1557 as a soldier in the guard of the new Governor García Hurtado de Mendoza. He first fought at the Battle of Millarapue. He later served in the garrison of the Cañete de la Frontera settlement under Captain Alonso de Reinoso. Reinoso eventually found an Indian who revealed the secret hideout of Caupolicán, the Mapuche Toki. Avendaño, with 50 Spanish cavalrymen under his command and the traitorous Indian as his guide, marched in stormy weather into the mountains to Pilmaiquén and captured Caupolicán as he was planning a new offensive against the Spaniards, on February 5, 1558. Avendaño brought the Toki back to Cañete de la Frontera, where Caupolicán was executed by impalement at the order of Captain Alonso de Reinoso.

As a reward for capturing Caupolicán, Avendaño was given an encomienda in the Purén Valley. Avendaño became notorious for his cruel treatment of the Indian workers on his encomienda. In July 1561, the Mapuches of the Purén Valley ambushed Avendaño and two other Spaniards who were visiting his encomienda, killing all three of them with axes. These Mapuches then cut off Avendaño's head and put it on a pike, and displayed it to the other Mapuches, which helped trigger the "second revolt" of the Arauco War.

== Sources ==
- Alonso de Góngora Marmolejo, Historia de Todas las Cosas que han Acaecido en el Reino de Chile y de los que lo han gobernado (1536-1575) (History of All the Things that Have happened in the Kingdom of Chile and of those that have governed it (1536-1575), Edición digital a partir de Crónicas del Reino de Chile, Madrid, Atlas, 1960, pp. 75–224, (on line in Spanish)
  - Capítulo XXVIII
  - Capítulo XXXIII
- Pedro Mariño de Lobera, Crónica del Reino de Chile, escrita por el capitán Pedro Mariño de Lobera....reducido a nuevo método y estilo por el Padre Bartolomé de Escobar. Edición digital a partir de Crónicas del Reino de Chile Madrid, Atlas, 1960, pp. 227-562, (Biblioteca de Autores Españoles; 569-575). Biblioteca Virtual Miguel de Cervantes (on line in Spanish)
  - Capítulo XI
- Diego de Rosales, Historia general de el Reino de Chile, Flandes Indiano, Tomo II; Benjamín Vicuña Mackenna, Impr. del Mercurio, 1878. Original from Harvard University, Digitized May 21, 2007
