= Lemucaguin =

Lemucaguin, a native of Andalicán, was the successor to Turcupichun as toqui of the Moluche Butalmapu north of the Biobío River in 1558. He organized a detachment of arquebusiers from weapons captured in the Battle of Marihueñu. He continued the war against García Hurtado de Mendoza after the executions of Caupolican and Turcupichun. Establishing pucaras at Quiapo and other locations to block Spanish access to the Arauco region. He was the first toqui to use firearms and artillery in the Battle of Quiapo However he was killed in this battle and was replaced by Illangulién. The later historian, Juan Ignacio Molina, calls the toqui that led at Quiapo Caupolicán the younger, son the executed toqui Caupolican

== See also ==
- Ainavillo
- Lautaro
- Loble

== Sources ==
- Diego de Rosales, “Historia General del Reino de Chile”, Flandes Indiano, 3 tomos. Valparaíso 1877 - 1878.
  - Historia general de el Reyno de Chile: Flandes Indiano, Tomo II (1554–1625)
    - Capitulo XXI. Como los indios aprendieron a disparar arcabuzes y hizieron un fuerte en Quiapo; gánansele los españoles y dan la paz al vencedor Don Garcia.
