= Colo-Colo (disambiguation) =

Colo-Colo is a Chilean men's football club based in Macul, Santiago.

Colo-Colo may also refer to:

- Colo-colo (condiment), a spicy Indonesian condiment
- Colo Colo (mythology), a rat-like creature from Mapuche mythology
- Colo-Colo (women), a Chilean women's football club
- Colo-Colo B, a Chilean men's football team
- Chilean ship Colo Colo, a list of ships
- Colocolo (tribal chief), a Mapuche leader

== See also ==
- Colo (disambiguation)
