= Czesław Ratka =

Polish engineer and translator (born 1952)

Czesław Ratka (born 1952) is a Polish engineer and translator. He graduated at Politechnika Śląska (Silesian University of Technology) in Gliwice. He specialised in electronics. He was especially concerned with hygrometry. He has been interested in Spanish language and literature for forty years. He is famous for translating two parts of La Araucana (The Araucaniad) by the 16th-century Spanish poet Alonso de Ercilla y Zúñiga (1533–1594). For this translation he was awarded with the Cervantes Institute Award. In his translation Czesław Ratka retained the ottava rima of the original. His version of the poem is regarded as excellent by critics and other translators, for example by Wojciech Charchalis and Florian Śmieja. Czesław Ratka's work was compared to Piotr Kochanowski's translation of Jerusalem Delivered by Torquato Tasso (1618).
