= Kolo =

Kolo may refer to:

== Arts and entertainment ==
- Kolo (dance), a South Slavic circle dance
- Kolo Ensemble (Serbia), the national ensemble of folk dances and songs
- Kolo (choral society), a Croatian singing organization
- Kolo (album), a 2006 release by the Serbian rock band Van Gogh
- Kolo (magazine), Croatian literary quarterly

== Places ==
=== Poland ===
- Koło
- Koło, Łódź Voivodeship
- Koło, Lublin Voivodeship
- Koło, Lubusz Voivodeship
- Koło, Warsaw

=== Other places ===
- Kamalanka, which was also known as Kolo, an ancient kingdom in present-day Thailand
- Kolo, Bosnia and Herzegovina
- Kolo (Tanzanian ward), Kondoa district, Dodoma Region, Tanzania
- Kolo, Togo
- Kolo Volost

== People ==
- Kolo Touré (born 1981), Ivorian footballer
- Roger Kolo (born 1943), Prime Minister of Madagascar
- Ibrahim Adamu Kolo (1956-2018), Niger academic
- Randal Kolo Muani (born 1998), French footballer

== Other uses ==
- Kolo (bread), Ethiopian small bread; see Dabo kolo
- KOLO-TV, television station in Reno, Nevada

== See also ==
- Kolos (disambiguation)
- Colo (disambiguation)
