= Caupolicán the Younger =

Caupolicán the Younger according to Juan Ignacio Molina was the son of the toqui Caupolicán. He was made toqui following the capture and execution of his father in 1558. He continued the first Mapuche rising against the Spanish conquistadors in 1558 and commanded the Mapuche army in constructing a pukara at Quiapo to block García Hurtado de Mendoza from rebuilding a fort in Arauco completing the chain of forts for suppression of their rebellion. In the Battle of Quiapo the Mapuche suffered a terrible defeat and there Caupolicán the younger died. His successor as toqui was Illangulién.

The earlier historian Diego de Rosales says the toqui that led at Quiapo was Lemucaguin.

== Sources ==
- The Geographical, Natural, and Civil History of Chili By Don Juan Ignatius Molina, Longman, Hurst, Rees, and Orme, Paternoster-Row, London, 1809
