= Colocolo (tribal chief) =

Mapuche leader in the Arauco War

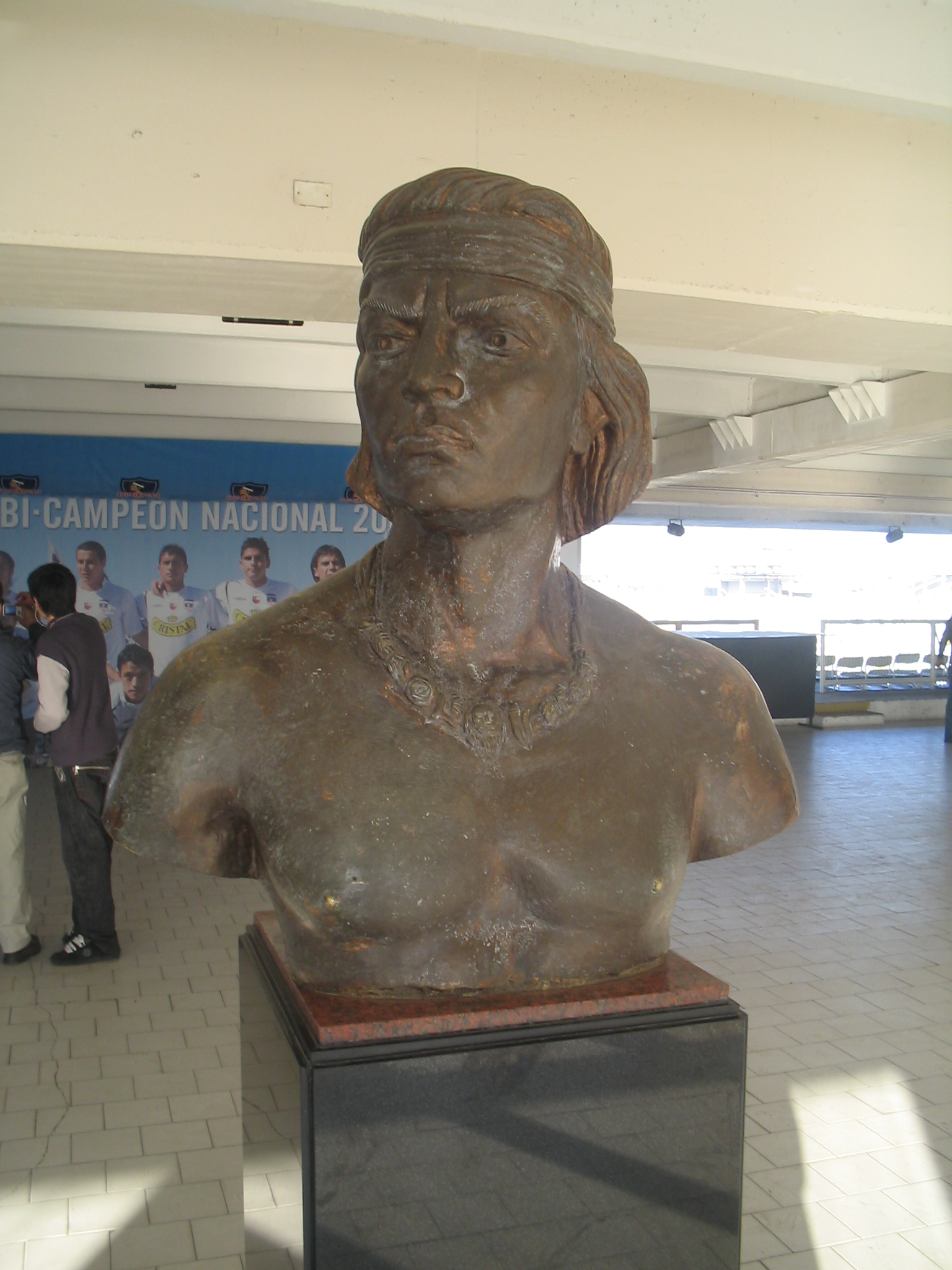
A bust of Colocolo on display at the Estadio Monumental David Arellano, Santiago, Chile.

Colocolo (from Mapudungun "colocolo", mountain cat) was a Mapuche leader ("cacique lonco") in the early period of the Arauco War. He was a major figure in Alonso de Ercilla y Zúñiga's epic poem La Araucana, about the early Arauco War. In the poem, he was the one that proposed the contest between the rival candidates for Toqui that resulted in the choice of Caupolicán. As a historical figure, there are few contemporary details about him. Stories of his life were written long after his lifetime and display many points of dubious historical accuracy.

== Mentions in contemporary accounts ==
Pedro Mariño de Lobera listed Colocolo as one of the caciques that offered submission to Pedro de Valdivia after the Battle of Penco. Jerónimo de Vivar, in his Chronicle of the Kingdom of Chile (1558), describes Colocolo as being a Mapuche leader who had 6,000 warriors and was one of the competitors for Toqui of the whole Mapuche army following the Battle of Tucapel. Millarapue was also a leader of 6,000 men, but was old and not a candidate for the leadership, and was the one who persuaded the others to quit arguing among themselves and settle the matter with a contest of strength, which resulted in the victory of Caupolicán who became Toqui.

Lobera later says Colocolo and Peteguelen were the leaders that discovered the advance of the army of Francisco de Villagra and summoned all the people who could fight from the neighboring provinces to oppose the Spanish in the Battle of Marihueñu. He was one of the commanders under Lautaro at the second destruction of Concepción on December 4, 1555. He also lists Colocolo as one of Caupolicán's lieutenants in the Battle of Millarapue against García Hurtado de Mendoza. Lobera also says that he was one of the major leaders of the Arauco area to submit to Mendoza after the Battle of Quiapo and the reestablishment of the fortress of San Felipe de Araucan in 1559. He is also said to have given Mendoza warning of the assassination plot of Mecial.

Alonso de Góngora Marmolejo, in his History of All the Things that Have happened in the Kingdom of Chile, mentions Colocolo in 1561 as a principal leader in Arauco and described him as a friend until death to the Spanish. He was consulted by Pedro de Villagra about the way to defeat the first outbreak of the second great Mapuche revolt that began that year. Marmolejo notes that Colocolo advised them to storm a fortress the rebels had built, and that such a defeat would end the rebellion. Later, in the following year after Villagra had evacuated the city of Cañete, revealing Spanish weakness, Colocolo was prevailed upon by the rebellious Mapuche in Arauco to take command of their army. At his order, Millalelmo laid siege to the fort of Arauco and other leaders sieged the fort of Los Infantes.

== Mentions in later accounts ==
Juan Ignacio Molina follows Ercilla's account of Colocolo as the wise elder, in his The Geographical, Natural and Civil History of Chili, Vol. II, (1808). He claims that Colocolo was killed in the 1558 Battle of Quiapo.

== Other mentions ==
Some have claimed that Colocolo held the position of "Toqui de la Paz" (Peace Chief) but took over strategic duties when Spanish conquest began, becoming the head of the native Mapuche forces against these invaders. Others believe that his death occurred during the great famine and typhus epidemic in 1554–1555.

== Modern symbolism ==
Colocolo is a symbol of heroic courage, bravery, and wisdom who fought and never surrendered to the Spaniards. Remembered as Ercilla's 60-something elder, widely respected by Mapuche people, many of his captains were head chiefs who gave their names to locations within Chile, such as Paicaví, Lemo, Lincoyán, Elicura and Orompello.

The most popular Chilean football club, Colo-Colo, was named after this warrior. The Chilean Navy used his name for several ships throughout history.

== Sources ==
- Jerónimo de Vivar, Crónica y relación copiosa y verdadera de los reinos de Chile (Chronicle and abundant and true relation of the kingdoms of Chile) ARTEHISTORIA REVISTA DIGITAL; Crónicas de América (on line in Spanish)(History of Chile 1535–1558)
- Alonso de Góngora Marmolejo, Historia de Todas las Cosas que han Acaecido en el Reino de Chile y de los que lo han gobernado (1536-1575) (History of All the Things that Have happened in the Kingdom of Chile and of those that have governed it (1536-1575)), Edición digital a partir de Crónicas del Reino de Chile, Madrid, Atlas, 1960, pp. 75–224, (on line in Spanish)
- Alonso de Ercilla y Zúñiga, La Araucana, eswikisource.
- Pedro Mariño de Lobera, Crónica del Reino de Chile, escrita por el capitán Pedro Mariño de Lobera....reducido a nuevo método y estilo por el Padre Bartolomé de Escobar. Edición digital a partir de Crónicas del Reino de Chile Madrid, Atlas, 1960, pp. 227-562, (Biblioteca de Autores Españoles; 569-575). Biblioteca Virtual Miguel de Cervantes (on line in Spanish)
- The Geographical, Natural, and Civil History of Chili by Don Juan Ignatius Molina, Longman, Hurst, Rees, and Orme, Paternoster-Row, London, 1809]
- Wilson, J. G.; Fiske, J., eds. (1891). "Colocolo". Appletons' Cyclopædia of American Biography. Vol. 1. New York: D. Appleton. pp. 693–4.

== See also ==
- History of Chile
- Arauco War
- Mapuche
