= Galvarino =

Mapuche warrior

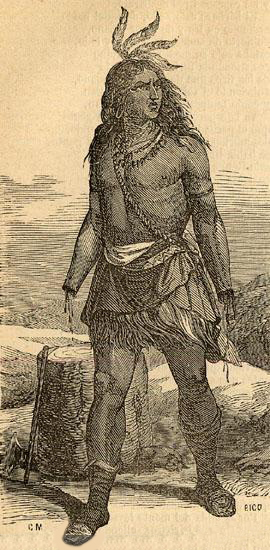
Galvarino

Galvarino (died c. November 30, 1557) was a famous Mapuche warrior during the majority of the early part of the Arauco War. He fought and was taken prisoner along with 150 other Mapuche, in the Battle of Lagunillas against governor García Hurtado de Mendoza. As punishment for insurrection, some of these prisoners were condemned to amputation of their right hand and nose, while others such as Galvarino had both hands cut off. Galvarino and the rest were then released as a lesson and warning for the rest of the Mapuche. Mendoza sent him to inform general Caupolicán of the number and quality of the people which had entered their land again, to put some fear into him, among other means that were tried, so that he might submit without coming to blows.

When returning to the Mapuche, he appeared before Caupolicán and the council of war, showing them his mutilations, crying out for justice and a greater rising of the Mapuche against this Spanish invader like the one of Lautaro. For his bravery and gallantry, he was named by the council to command a squadron. With knives fastened on both mutilated wrists replacing his hands, he fought next to Caupolicán in the following campaign until the Battle of Millarapue, where his squadron fought against that of governor Mendoza himself and he was able to strike down the second in command.

He came commanding as a sergeant and animating his men this way: "Ea, my brothers, see that you all fight very well, you do not want me as I am without hands, so that you will not be able to work nor to eat, if you do not give it to them!" And he raised those arms on high, showing them to cause them to fight with more spirit and saying to them: "Those that you are going to fight with cut them, and also will do to whichever of you they take, and nobody is allowed to flee but to die, because you die defending your mother country." He moved ahead of the squadron a distance, and said with a loud voice that he would die first and though he no longer had hands, that he would do what he could with his teeth.
Jerónimo de Vivar, Crónica, Capítulo CXXXIII.

"My Brothers, why have you stopped attacking these Christians, seeing the manifest damage that from the day which they entered our kingdom until today they have done and are doing? And they still will do to you what you see that they have done and they are doing? And still they will do to you what you see that they have done to me, cut your hands off, if you are not diligent in making the most of wreaking destruction on these so injurious people for us and or our children and women."
Pedro Mariño de Lobera, Crónica del Reino de Chile, Libro 2 Capítulo IV

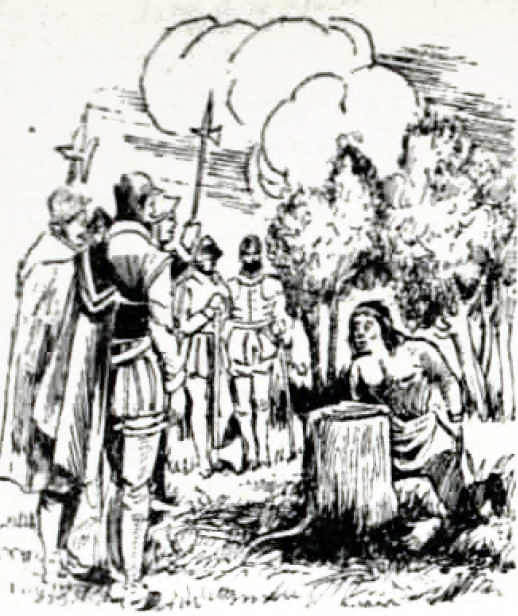
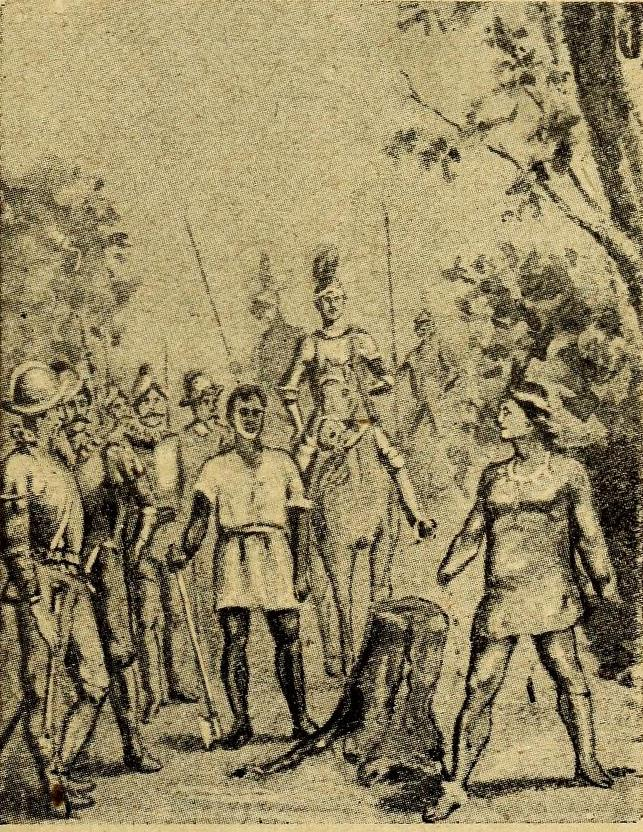
Depictions of Galvarino's amputation

However, Mendoza's command broke Galvarino's division after over an hour of combat and won the battle, killing 3,000 Mapuche and capturing over 800 including him. Mendoza ordered him to be executed by being thrown to the dogs.

In the book La Araucana, written by Alonso de Ercilla, he explains that the real death of Galvarino was by hanging.
