= Milarupu =

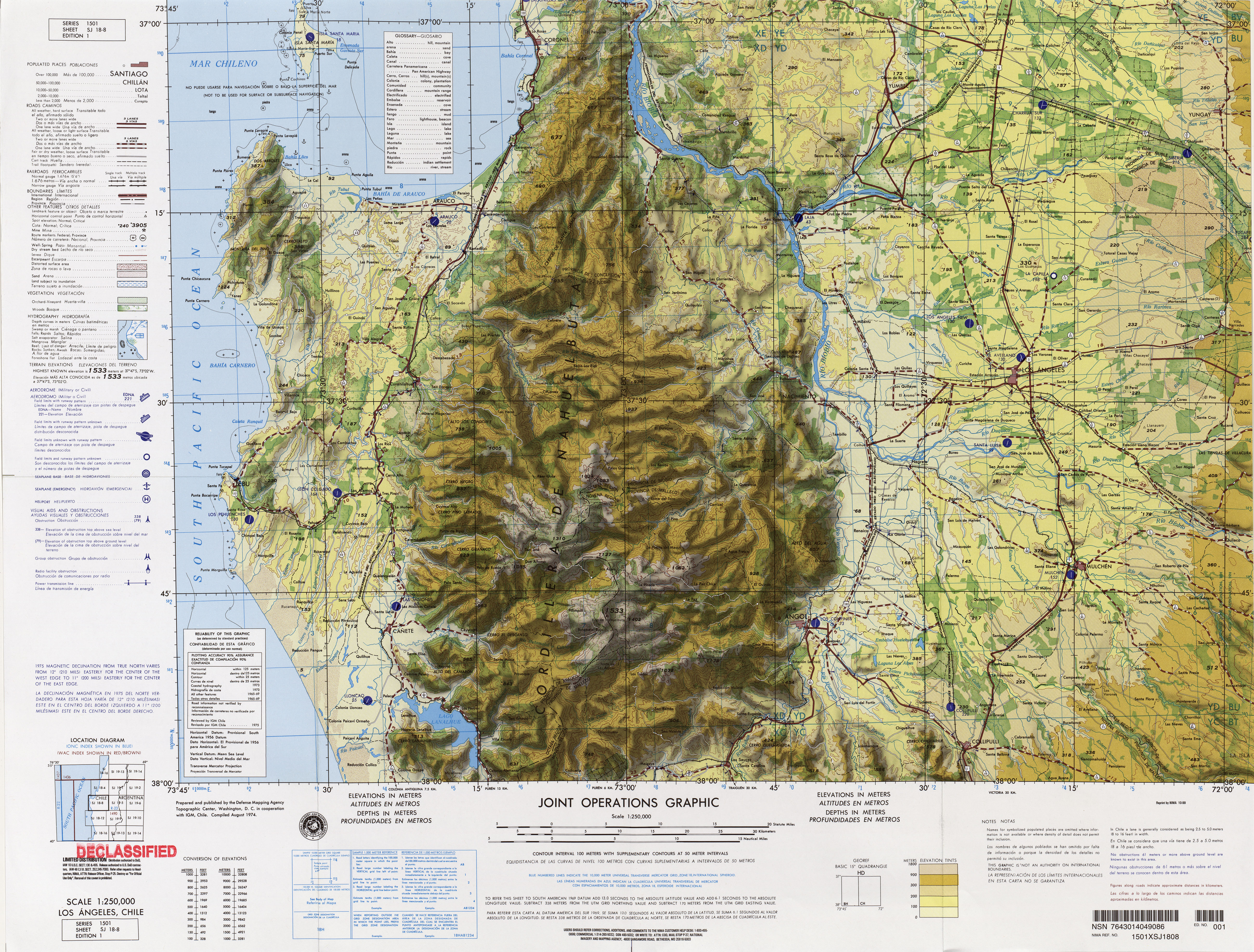

Melirupu is a place in Arauco Province that is 12 kilometers to the southwest of Arauco, Chile, in the direction of Quiapo. It was a small village of about 300 inhabitants in the late 19th century. The surrounding land had the same name. The Mapudungun name, formed of meli and the alteration of rypy, means "four ways". It later became known as Millarupu, "gold way", and was corrupted into Millarapu or Millarapue or Melirupo.

This place was one of the rehues of the Moluche aillarehue of Arauco, and the site of the Battle of Millarapue where the Mapuche Toqui Caupolicán was defeated after he assaulted the camp of Governor Don Garcia Hurtado de Mendoza on November 30, 1557.

== Sources ==
- Francisco Solano Asta-Buruaga y Cienfuegos, Diccionario geográfico de la República de Chile (Geographic dictionary of the Republic of Chile), Segunda Edición Corregida y Aumentada, Nueva York, D. Appleton y Compañía, 1899, pp. 439–40
