= Quiapo =

Quiapo may refer to:

- Quiapo, Chile, a location in Arauco Province
- Quiapo, Manila, a district in the Philippines
  - Quiapo Church
  - Batang Quiapo, a 1986 Filipino action-comedy film
  - Batang Quiapo (TV series), a 2023 Philippine television drama series
