= Kolos =

Kolos may refer to:

People

- Kolos (name), a first or last name

Sports

- Kolos (sports society), a Ukrainian sports society
- Kolos Stadium (Boryspil), a multifunctional stadium in Boryspil, Ukraine
- FC Kolos Bykovo, a soccer team based in Bykovo, Volgograd Oblast, Russia
- FC Kolos Kovalivka, a soccer team based in Kovalivka, Kyiv Oblast, Ukraine
- FC Kolos Krasnodar, a soccer team based in Krasnodar, Russia
- FC Kolos Pokrovskoye, a soccer team based in Pokrovskoye, Rostov Oblast, Russia
- FC Kolos Nikopol, name of FC Elektrometalurh-NZF Nikopol, a soccer team based in Nikopol, Ukraine, in 1970–1991
- FC Kolos Pavlohrad, former name of FC Kosmos Pavlohrad, a former soccer team based in Pavlohrad, Ukraine
- FC Kolos Poltava, former name of FC Vorskla Poltava, a soccer team based in Poltava, Ukraine
- FC Kolos Ustye, name of FC Stroitel Vitebsk, a soccer team based in Vitebsk, Belarus, in 1989–1993

Other

- KOLOS, concrete armor units developed in India for coastal structures
- Kolos (rural locality), several rural localities in Russia
- Kołos Medal, a Polish medal awarded for achievements in chemistry
- Kolos, a reported codename for the Russian radio station nicknamed The Pip

== See also ==
- Kolo (disambiguation)
- Colos (disambiguation)
