= Kolos (rural locality) =

Kolos (Russian: Колос) is the name of several rural localities in Russia.

== Modern localities ==
- Kolos, Republic of Adygea, a khutor in Teuchezhsky District of the Republic of Adygea; 44°55′N 39°24′E
- Kolos, Novoalexandrovsky Selsoviet, Rubtsovsky District, Altai Krai, a crossing loop in Novoalexandrovsky Selsoviet of Rubtsovsky District in Altai Krai; 51°24′N 81°8′E
- Kolos, Rubtsovsky Selsoviet, Rubtsovsky District, Altai Krai, a settlement in Rubtsovsky Selsoviet of Rubtsovsky District in Altai Krai; 51°25′N 81°8′E
- Kolos, Bryansk Oblast, a settlement in Krasnorogsky Rural Administrative Okrug of Pochepsky District in Bryansk Oblast; 52°58′N 33°43′E
- Kolos, Kirov Oblast, a settlement in Adyshevsky Rural Okrug of Orichevsky District in Kirov Oblast
- Kolos, Kostroma Oblast, a mestechko in Minskoye Settlement of Kostromskoy District in Kostroma Oblast
- Kolos, Krasnodar Krai, a khutor in Oktyabrsky Rural Okrug of Krasnoarmeysky District in Krasnodar Krai
- Kolos, Oryol Oblast, a settlement in Lunacharsky Selsoviet of Uritsky District in Oryol Oblast
- Kolos, Penza Oblast, a settlement in Bessonovsky Selsoviet of Bessonovsky District in Penza Oblast
- Kolos, Saratov Oblast, a settlement in Marksovsky District of Saratov Oblast
- Kolos, Sverdlovsk Oblast, a settlement in Sysertsky District of Sverdlovsk Oblast
- Kolos, Voronezh Oblast, a settlement in Kalacheyevskoye Rural Settlement of Kalacheyevsky District in Voronezh Oblast

== Abolished localities ==
- Kolos, Republic of Tatarstan, a village in Rybno-Slobodsky District of the Republic of Tatarstan; abolished in January 2009
