= Chilean tug Colo Colo (1931) =

Chilean naval vessel

History

Chile
- Name: Colo Colo
- Namesake: Colo Colo
- Operator: Chilean Navy
- Ordered: 1929
- Builder: Bow, McLachlan & Co, Paisley, Scotland
- Yard number: 494
- Launched: 1931
- In service: 1931
- Identification: ATA 73
- Status: Museum ship

General characteristics
- Type: tugboat
- Tonnage: 361 tons GRT
- Displacement: 760 tons displacement
- Length: 126.5 ft (38.6 m)
- Beam: 27 ft (8.2 m)
- Draught: 14 ft (4.3 m)
- Installed power: 1050 IHP diesel (since 1971)
- Propulsion: screw
- Speed: 12 knots (22 km/h)
- Armament: One 3 in (76 mm) cannon; two 20mm machine guns

Colo Colo is a historic tugboat of the Chilean Navy built in Scotland for Chile in 1931. She was a steamship until she was reconditioned in 1971, at which time she was re-engined as a motor vessel. She spent her service career in southern Chile.

During the Chilean naval mutiny of 1931 she chased the Chilean submarine Rucumilla near Quiriquina Island.

In 1987 she was withdrawn from service and preserved at the Chilean Navy Museum at Punta Arenas.

== See also ==
- List of decommissioned ships of the Chilean Navy
- Chilean ship Colo Colo
