= Pedro Castillo (disambiguation) =

Pedro Castillo (born 1969) is a former president of Peru.

Pedro Castillo can also refer to:

- Pedro Castillo (painter), (1790–1858), Venezuelan painter
- Pedro del Castillo (1521–1569), a Spanish conquistador
- a Guatemalan executed for child murder, see Roberto Girón and Pedro Castillo
