= Colocolo (disambiguation) =

Colocolo, colo-colo, Colo-Colo, or Colo Colo may refer to:

- Colocolo (tribal chief), 16th century Mapuche leader and Chilean folk hero.
- Colo Colo (mythology), evil rat-like creature from Mapuche mythology.
- Colocolo (Leopardus colocolo), a South American cat native to Chile.
- Colo-Colo, a football team from Macul, Santiago, Chile.
- Colo Colo de Futebol e Regatas, a football team from Ilhéus, Bahia, Brazil.
- Colo-colo (condiment), hot and spicy condiment the cuisine of the Maluku archipelago, Indonesia.
- Colocolo opossum (Dromiciops gliroides), or monito del monte, a South American marsupial.
- Qulu Qulu, Hispanicized Colo Colo, an archaeological site in Peru
- Chilean ship Colo Colo various

== See also ==
- Colo (disambiguation)
