= Caupolicán =

Mapuche war leader from 1553–1558

Caupolican
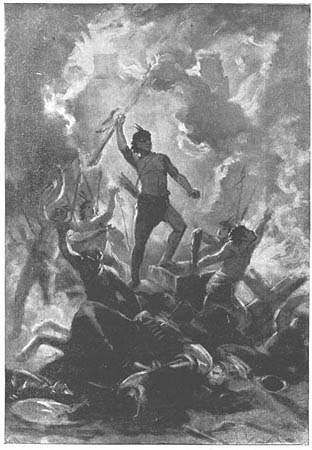
- Caupolican
- Born: Unknown; Pilmaiquén, Chile
- Died: 1558; Cañete, Chile
- Cause of death: Capital punishment
- Predecessor: Lincoyan (1551–1553)
- Successor: Lemucaguin or Caupolican the Younger (1558)
- Children: Lemucaguin or Caupolican the Younger

Caupolicán (meaning 'polished flint' (queupu) or 'blue quartz stone' (Kallfulikan) in Mapudungun) was a toqui or war leader of the Mapuche people, who led the resistance of his people against the Spanish conquistadors who invaded the territory of today's Chile during the sixteenth century. His rule as Toqui lasted roughly from 1553–1558 AD.

== Biography ==
According to the poetic work La Araucana the primary known wife of Caupolican was Fresia, although she is also named Gueden or Paca by other authors. His only known child was named Lemucaguin, or Caupolican the younger. According to tradition and the writings of Fernando Alegria, Caupolican was of a grave countenance and was blind in one eye from childhood.

== First years ==
Caupolican fought from his youth on against the Spanish Conquistadors helping to achieve the freedom of his people. He was elected Toqui of the Mapuche people, as Lautaro's successor (although Alonso de Ercilla states he was elected previously and that he was a secret candidate for this office chosen by Colo Colo to conduct the War of Arauco). It appears that Caupolican was a member of a very respected family in Mapuche society, seeing as he and his brothers were always in the group of military leaders who planned battle strategies for the tribe.

The Mapuches are a people who resisted the Spanish conquistadors of southern Chile. Together with Lautaro, Caupolican was one of the leaders of the Mapuche people in the wars of the 16th century. Caupolican cooperated with Lautaro in the Battle of Tucapel and the subsequent hostile takeover of the Tucapel fort, in which the Spanish army was defeated and their commanding officer Pedro de Valdivia was killed. The execution of Pedro de Valdivia is attributed to Caupolican by the historian Jeronimo de Vivar. The name Caupolican became a symbol of Native American resistance, and his life and acts were collected by Alonso de Ercilla - one of the military captains in the army of Garcia Hurtado de Mendoza y Manrique - in his epic poem La Araucana and by Ruben Dario in his poem Caupolican. The primary conflicts of the Arauco War in which Caupolican participated were: the Battle at Lagunillas as a soldier, and the Battles of Millarapue and Cañete as Toqui.

== Battle of Lagunillas ==
After the death of Lautaro, the Mapuche people were left without an effective leader to guide them into battle; evidence is shown of this perilous situation in the combat of the Fort of San Luis, which they failed to take, and in the Battle of Lagunillas on 5 September 1557. In this battle, an army of 12,000 Mapuche warriors at the command of several Toquis—among them Lincoyan and Galvarino—attacked a large Spanish army led by Garcia Hurtado de Mendoza. As he passed the Biobio river, coming from Concepcion, Garcia lead a force of 600 well armed soldiers and 1,500 yanakunas, who were attacked by the Mapuche forces in a marsh named "lagunillas".

The attack was highly disorganized, and despite the great numeric difference, the Mapuche were defeated in brutal hand-to-hand combat; leaving hundreds of dead and injured and 150 prisoners of war. Among these prisoners was one of the Toquis: Galvarino. Garcia Hurtado de Mendoza, ordered his soldiers to mutilate the right hand and nose of the prisoners to teach them a lesson. Galvarino not only extended his right hand to be amputated, but also extended his other hand before the soldier ordered to cut his hand off and both were amputated before he was freed. This type of lesson infuriated and hardened the Mapuche even more towards the usurpers of their territory.

== Election as Toqui ==
After these defeats the Mapuche people united in a great council in the Pilmaiquen Mountains, this council had the objective of unifying the Mapuche military force under the command of one man by electing a Toqui. Caupolican was chosen as Toqui due to his great physical strength and bravery in battle. According to the historian Jeronimo de Vivar, Caupolican had to demonstrate his strength to the caciques, among which were included Tucapel, Rengo, and Colo Colo and who were presided by the latter, by holding a thick tree trunk upon his shoulders for two days and one night without fainting before he could be elected as Toqui. Caupolican defeated other candidates for this position namely, Paicavi, Lincoyan, and Elicura. Alonso de Ercilla immortalized this event in La Araucana.

== Battle of Millarapue ==
After the victory of the Spaniards in Lagunillas, Garcia entered hostile territory in search of a decisive battle. The Spanish forces set up camp in Millarapue, in the central area of Araucania, 29 November. The Mapuche forces led by Caupolican attempted a surprise attack on the enemy camp on the dawn of 30 November. Coincidentally, the Spanish troops were celebrating Saint Andrew's Day and as the attack was under way, the Spanish troops sounded a trumpet reveille, which the Mapuche forces took as an alarm; their belief that they had been discovered caused the attack to be ruined. There were 15,000 attackers, among which Galvarino was included, who went in front, appearing with his severed arms and inciting the passions of his comrades. The battle of Millarapue lasted from the early morning until 2 PM the following day, and Caupolican directed it from atop a white horse. Finally, the Mapuche forces were flanked and surrounded, which lead to their defeat. The Spanish established the Cañete fort, not far from where the fortress of Tucapel was located.

== Battle of Cañete Fort ==
On 20 January 1558, the Spanish army suffered an attack on the fortified city of Cañete, in the which it was surrounded in siege by more than 15,000 Mapuche led by Caupolican. Caupolican's idea was to let the inhabitants of the city die of hunger. The situation became very grave, because leaving the fort to fight on open ground was a certain defeat for the Spaniards, and a direct attack on the fort, with a highly armed Spanish contingent, would cause a large number of deaths among the Mapuche force. A yanakuna named Andresillo offered to attract the Mapuches to the fort by subterfuge. The plan consisted of Andresillo making friends with the attackers, making him appear like a Spanish deserter; The Mapuche army believed Andresillo and he told them that the hour of the siesta was the best time to attack the Spaniards unaware, and that he would open the doors to allow them to perform a surprise attack. Caupolican tried to prove the veracity of Andresillo's claim ordering a spy to be introduced in the interior of the fort. Alonso de Reinoso, captain of the fort, had already expected the spy's visit and gave instructions to all his soldiers to pretend to be sleeping. The 5 February was fixed as the date of the attack. Andresillo opened the doors of the fort and a group of Mapuche entered silently. When almost the entire army was already inside the fort, they were received with rounds of gunfire that caused a high number of casualties among the attackers, who escaped in a disorganized fashion. Caupolican was able to flee thanks to the fact that the Spanish cavalry had not yet arrived at the zone of combat. When they finally did arrive, the Mapuche troops retreated through the hills and the Spaniards left the fort chasing them.

== Death ==
While the surviving Mapuche forces were still retreating, an advance party commanded by Pedro de Avendaño arrived at Pilmaiquen, and in the Battle of Antihuala (on 5 February 1558) they captured Caupolican, who was in process of preparing a counteroffensive. According to De Vivar, while he was being guided, tied up, by a squad of Spanish soldiers towards the fort of Tucapel, an irate Mapuche woman appeared in front of them, whose name was Fresia, with a baby in her arms; the baby was a child of the defeated toqui. The woman reprimanded him for having allowed himself to be captured alive; she threw the baby down at his feet and walked away, useless the cries given asking her to return for the child. The march continued silently in its direction. He was taken before the veteran Alonso de Reinoso, who condemned him to die by impalement. Cristobal de Arevalo, the field marshal, was asked to be the executioner. Caupolican was taken and tied to a raised platform with a sharp wooden spike.

According to Ercilla, while on the platform, he lifted his right leg and kicked his executioner off the platform. After doing so, he then leaped onto the spike himself. Galvarino was also captured and hanged. After these terrible episodes, and due to familial prestige, Caupolican the younger, Caupolican's oldest son, was chosen as the Mapuche military leader, leading the Battle of Quiapo (November 1558).

Caupolican is considered by many to have been a very fierce warrior, although he did not have the victories of Lautaro. In modern times, Caupolican is recognized for his exploits in all of Chile by the naming of streets, theaters, parks and monuments in his honor. It is falsely believed that the bronze statue found on the Santa Lucia hill in Santiago is a tribute to the Toqui. What is true is that the statue is a work of the sculptor Nicanor Plaza, that popular Chilean tradition associates with Caupolican.

== See also ==
- Pedro De Valdivia
- Arauco War
- Lautaro
- Alonso De Ercilla
- Lincoyan
- Lemucaguin
- Alonso De Reinoso
- Jeronimo De Vivar
- Alonso De Gongora Marmolejo
- Pedro Mariño De Lobera

== Sources ==
- De Vivar, Jeronimo (1558). Crónica y relación copiosa y verdadera de los reinos de chile (in Spanish). Burgos. p. Chapters CXV-CXXXVI. Archived from the original on 11 August 2017.
- Goodrich, Samuel G. (1843). Lives of Celebrated American Indians. Boston: Bradbury, Soden. pp. 43–66.
- de Gongora Marmolejo, Alonso (1852). Historia de Todas las Cosas que han Acaecido en el Reino de Chile y de los que lo han gobernado (in Spanish). Madrid. p. Chapter XXVII. Archived from the original on 3 March 2016.
- de Lobera, Pedro Mariño (1865). Crónica del Reino de Chile, Book 2. p. Chapter IV.
