= Alonso de Ercilla =

Spanish soldier and poet (1533–1594)

Don Alonso de Ercilla Caballero de Santiago
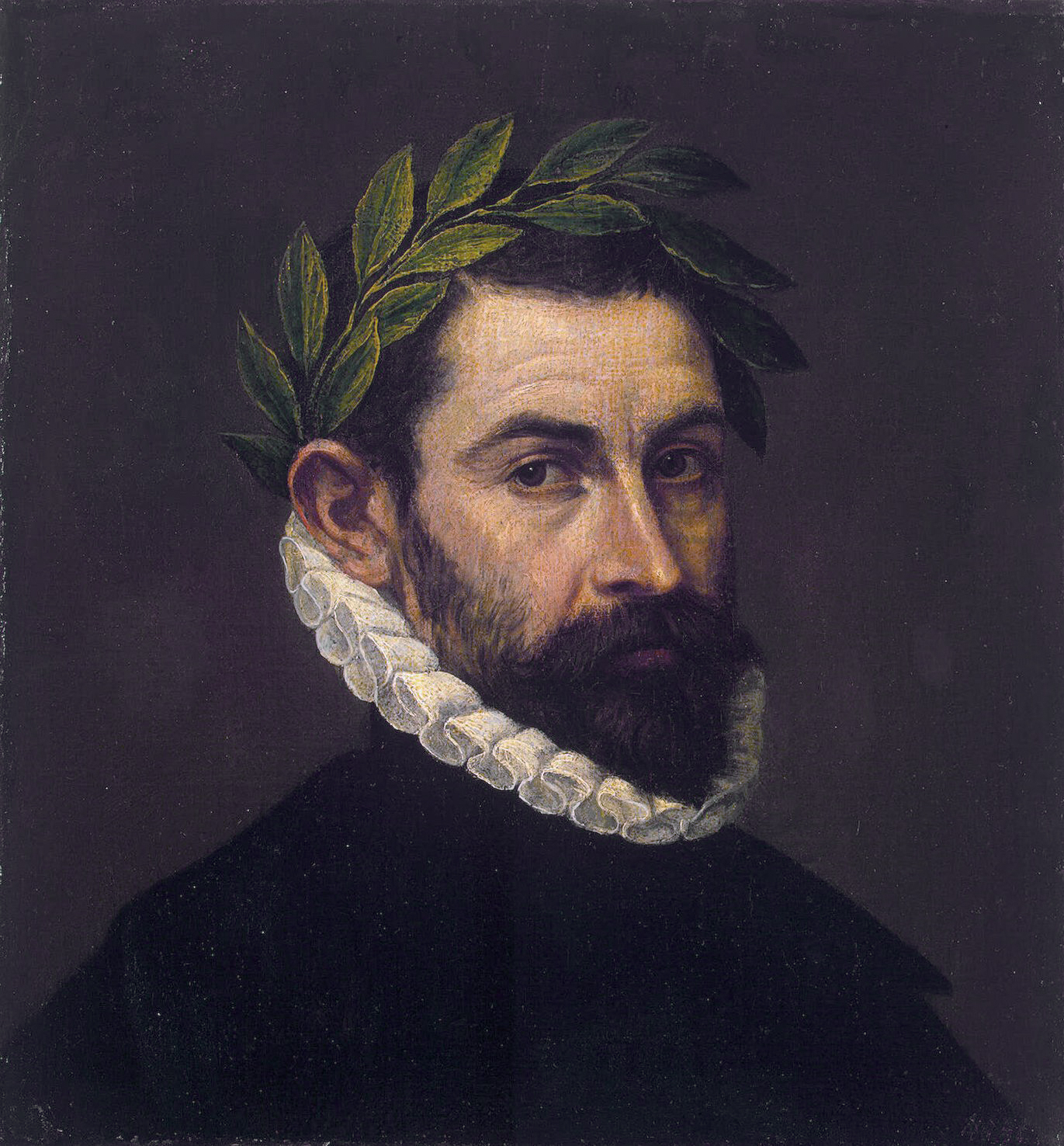
- Born: 7 August 1533; Madrid, Spain
- Died: 29 November 1594 (aged 61); Madrid, Spain

Signature
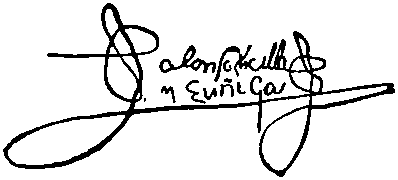

Alonso de Ercilla y Zúñiga (7 August 1533 – 29 November 1594) was a Spanish soldier and poet, born in Madrid. While in Chile (1556–63) he fought against the Araucanians (Mapuche), and there he began the epic poem La Araucana, considered one of the greatest epics of the Spanish Golden Age. This heroic work in 37 cantos is divided into three parts, published in 1569, 1578, and 1589. It celebrates both the violence of the conquistadors and the courage of the Araucanians.

== Biography ==
Ercilla was born into a Basque noble family. His father was Fortuño García de Ercilla, and his mother Doña Leonor de Zúñiga, both from Bermeo (Biscay). In 1548, after his father's death, his mother became lady-in-waiting to the Infanta María and made young Alonso a page to the heir-apparent, Prince Philip (afterwards King Philip II). Ercilla received a thorough education from the most learned teachers, and also enjoyed the advantages of extensive travel and life at court where he came in contact with high personages. When he was only fifteen, he accompanied 21-year-old Philip through Italy and Germany; and their travels lasted three years. Later, Ercilla accompanied his mother to Bohemia where he left her and then visited Austria, Hungary, and other countries. Returning to Spain, he soon started out again with Philip. In this capacity Ercilla (sometimes spelled Arcilla) visited Italy, Germany and the Netherlands, and was present in 1554 at the marriage of his master to Queen Mary I of England.

In London, he made the acquaintance of Jerónimo de Alderete (1555), whose stories of his thrilling adventures in the New World so fired Ercilla's imagination that he was determined to accompany Alderete to the New World. He obtained leave from Philip, and they set sail for America, 15 October 1555. Soon after their arrival, however, Alderete died (near Panamá, April 1556).

In 1556 Ercilla continued on his way to Peru and accompanied García Hurtado de Mendoza, recently named Governor and Commander-in-chief of Chile, where the Araucanians had revolted. He distinguished himself in the ensuing campaign. Apparently, he remained in Chile seventeen months, between 1557 and 1559. He participated in the battles of Lagunillas, Quiapo and Millarapue, and witnessed the death of Caupolicán, protagonist of La Araucana. This is an epic poem of military exaltation in 37 "cantos" or verses, where the narrator relays the most significant facts of the Arauco War against the Araucanos (mapuches) and which he began to write during the campaign.

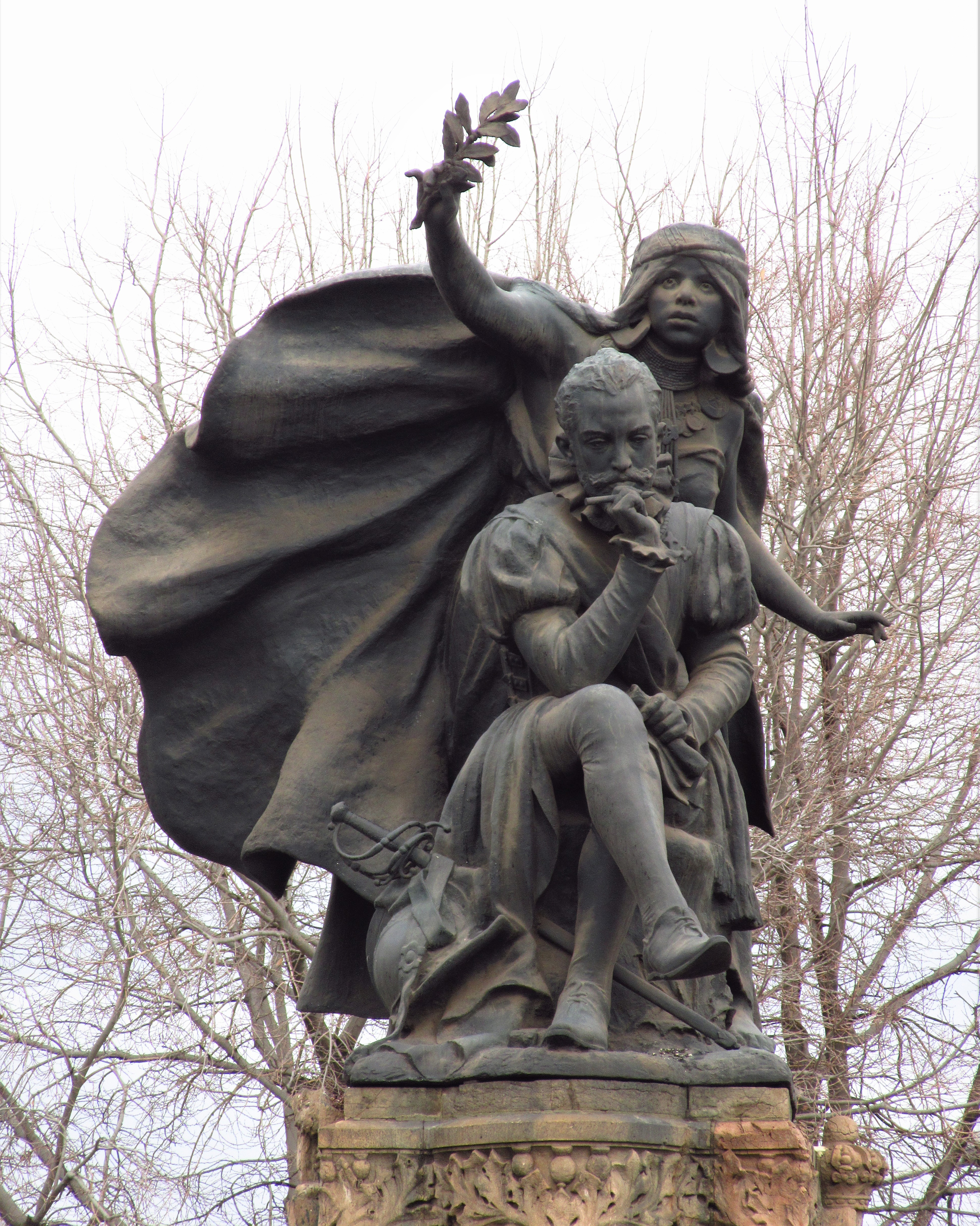
Statue of Alonso de Ercilla in Blanco Encalada, Santiago de Chile

In March 1558, García Hurtado de Mendoza founded the city of San Mateo de Osorno and while their neighbours were preoccupied with the celebrations in the new city, García left by a secret entrance, disguised by a helmet with closed visor, accompanied by Ercilla and Pedro of Eyrie. They were confronted by Juan de Pineda, an old enemy of Alonso de Ercilla, and there was a fight. García was warned of the situation.

Alonso de Ercilla ran to a church and looked for asylum. The governor imprisoned both duelists and condemned them to be executed on the following day. However, many people considered the sentence unjust and tried to persuade García to reprieve them. The preparations for the execution continued and all hope of saving them was lost. Then two women, one Spanish and another Native American, approached the house of García, entering by the window, and managed to convince the governor to spare the lives of both. Ercilla was imprisoned for three months and soon afterwards was exiled to Peru.

=== Later life ===
After Ercilla's return to Spain in 1562, he made several diplomatic journeys to Austria, where his mother was a maid of honor at the imperial court, and also visited Italy, France, Germany and Bohemia. In 1570, he married Doña María de Bazán, a woman of illustrious family and of intellectual attainments and, after other diplomatic missions, settled permanently in Spain in 1577. In 1571 he was made a knight of the Order of Santiago, and in 1578 he was employed by Philip II on a mission to Zaragoza. He complained of living in poverty but left a modest fortune and was obviously disappointed at not being offered the post of secretary of state. Ercilla's later years were saddened by the loss of his only son, and his own death occurred in Madrid in 1594.

== Works ==
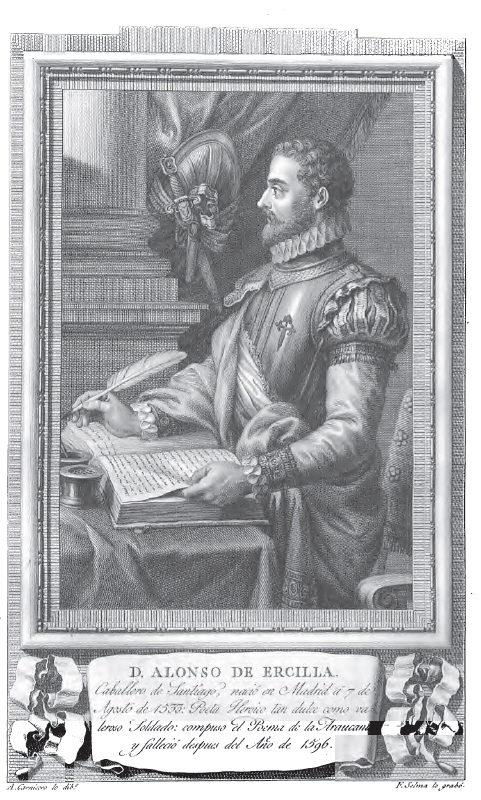
Alonso de Ercilla in the Retratos de Españoles Ilustres ("Portraits of Illustrious Spaniards"), 1791.

Ercilla's great work is La Araucana, an epic poem of thirty-seven cantos, describing the difficulties encountered by the Spaniards during the insurrection in Arauco, and the heroic deeds of the natives as well as his companions. The epic partakes of the character of history, and the author adheres with such strict fidelity to the truth, that subsequent historians characterize his work as thoroughly trustworthy. In it the difficult art of storytelling is carried to perfection. Places are admirably described, dates are given with accuracy, and the customs of the native faithfully set forth, giving to the narrative animation and colouring.

The poem was published in three parts, of which the first, composed in Chile and first appearing in 1569, is a versified narrative adhering strictly to historic fact; the second, published in 1578, is encumbered with visions and other romantic machinery; and the third, which appeared in 1589-1590, contains, in addition to the subject proper, a variety of episodes mostly irrelevant. Nevertheless, many scholars consider it the most successful Renaissance epic in the Classical mode written in Spanish. The best editions are those published by the Spanish Academy in 1776 and 1828.

== In literature ==
In his novel In Search of the Castaways (1867), Jules Verne wrote, "Araucania is populated by the Mapuche, the native Chilean race extolled in verse by the poet Ercilla".

== Legacy ==
There is a municipality in the Araucania Region of Chile named after Ercilla.

The plant genus Ercilla is named after him by French botanist A. de Jussieu.

== See also ==
- Pedro de Valdivia
- Francisco de Villagra
- Jerónimo de Alderete
- Garcia Hurtado de Mendoza
- Arauco War
- Mapuche people
- Lautaro
- Caupolicán
- Colocolo
- Czesław Ratka, a Polish translator of La Araucana
