= Laraquete River =

River in Chile

Coordinates: 37.1670°S 73.1830°W

The Laraquete River is a small river in Arauco Province, Bío Bío Region of Chile. Its sources are in the Cordillera de Nahuelbuta and they flow west to its mouth at the bay of Arauco and the foot of the hill of Andalicán where there is located the town of Laraquete.

== Sources ==
- Francisco Solano Asta Buruaga y Cienfuegos, Diccionario geográfico de la República de Chile, NUEVA YORK, D. APPLETON Y COMPAÑÍA, 1899: Laraquete (Rio de). Page 358
