= Colo =

Colo may refer to:

== Places ==
=== Australia ===
- Colo High School, in North Richmond, New South Wales
- Colo River, in New South Wales
  - Central Colo, locality
  - Colo, New South Wales, locality
  - Colo Heights, locality
  - Upper Colo, locality
  - Colo Shire, former local government area that became part of the City of Hawkesbury
- Several locations in the Southern Highlands region of New South Wales:
  - Colo Vale, New South Wales, town
  - Colo Parish, cadastral division in New South Wales
- A former name of Duaringa, Queensland, Australia

=== Chile ===
- Church of Colo, church in Quemchi commune, Chiloé Province, Los Lagos Region

=== France ===
- Colonial School, Paris, university sometimes called "la Colo"

=== Indonesia ===
- Colo (volcano), in Indonesia

=== United States ===
- Colo, Iowa, United States
- Colo., an abbreviation for the U.S. state of Colorado

== People ==
=== Given name ===
- Colo Halit (born 1986), Swedish football midfielder and winger
- Colo Tavernier O'Hagan (1942–2020), British-French screenwriter

=== Surname ===
- Don Colo (born 1925), American football player
- Nobel Boungou Colo (born 1988), Congolese-French basketball small forward and power forward
- Papo Colo (born 1946), Puerto Rican artist
- Licia Colò (born 1962), Italian television hostess and journalist
- Zeno Colò (1920–1993), Italian alpine skier
- Nando de Colo (born 1987), French basketball player

== Other ==
- Colo claw fish, fictional carnivorous species in Star Wars
- Colo (film)
- Colo (gorilla), the first gorilla born into captivity
- Colo Wars, a pair of wars in 1870s Fiji
- An alternate name for the Alemow (Citrus × macrophylla)
- A colloquial term for the French École Nationale de la France d'Outre-Mer
- Short for colocation centre

== See also ==
- Vive la colo!, 2012 French television series
- Colo-Colo (disambiguation)
- Colos (disambiguation)
- Colocolo (disambiguation)
