= Villalba de Rioja =

- Municipality
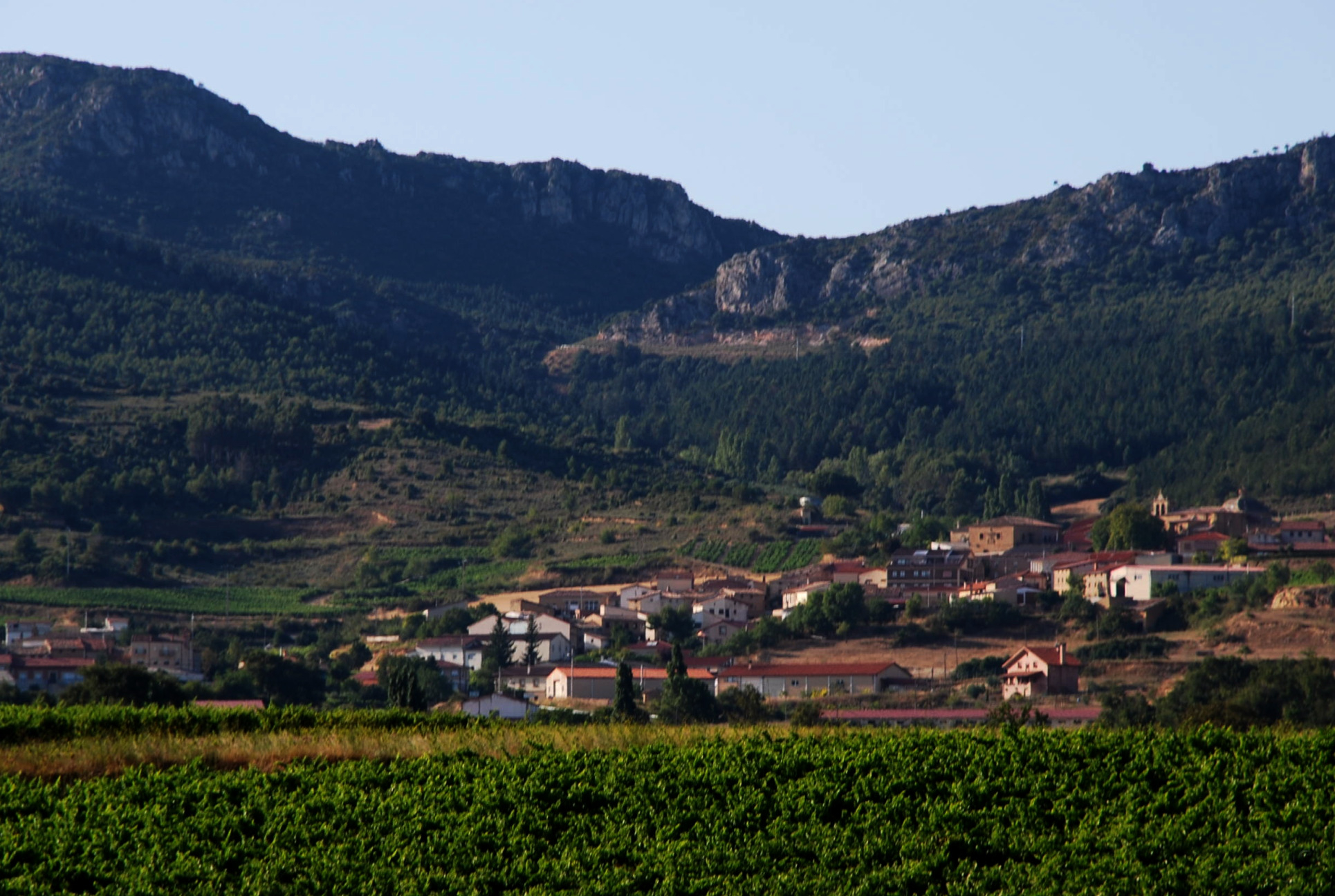
- Skyline of Villalba de Rioja

- Location within La Rioja, Spain Location within Spain
- Coordinates: 42°36′32″N 2°53′16″W
- Country: Spain
- Autonomous community: La Rioja
- Comarca: Haro

Government
  - Mayor: Gabriel Muga (Ciudadanos)

Area
  - Total: 8.96 km^{2} (3.46 sq mi)
- Elevation: 561 m (1,841 ft)

Population (2025-01-01)
  - Total: 155
- Demonym(s): villalbés, sa; raposo, sa
- Postal code: 26292

Villalba de Rioja is a municipality in the autonomous community of La Rioja (Spain), on the southern slopes of the mountains Obarenes. It borders the provinces of Alava and Burgos. Haro 5 km far from the LR-401. By the municipality elapses Esperamalo stream tributary of the Ebro river. The municipality covers an area of 8.96 square kilometres (3.46 sq mi) and as of 2011 had a population of 150 people.

== Interesting places ==
=== Buildings and monuments ===
==== Casa Palacio of the Ruiz del Castillo ====
Documentation known colloquially as "Traspalacio" to be 130 m. east of the headquarters. In the oldest part (cellar,) was born Traspalacio Don Pedro del Castillo in 1521 who later founded the city of Argentina Mendoza and the 1561.

==== Casa Palacio of Cirac ====
Casa Palacio that once belonged to the noble family of the Counts of Cirac and Castillofiel Counts.

=== Other ===
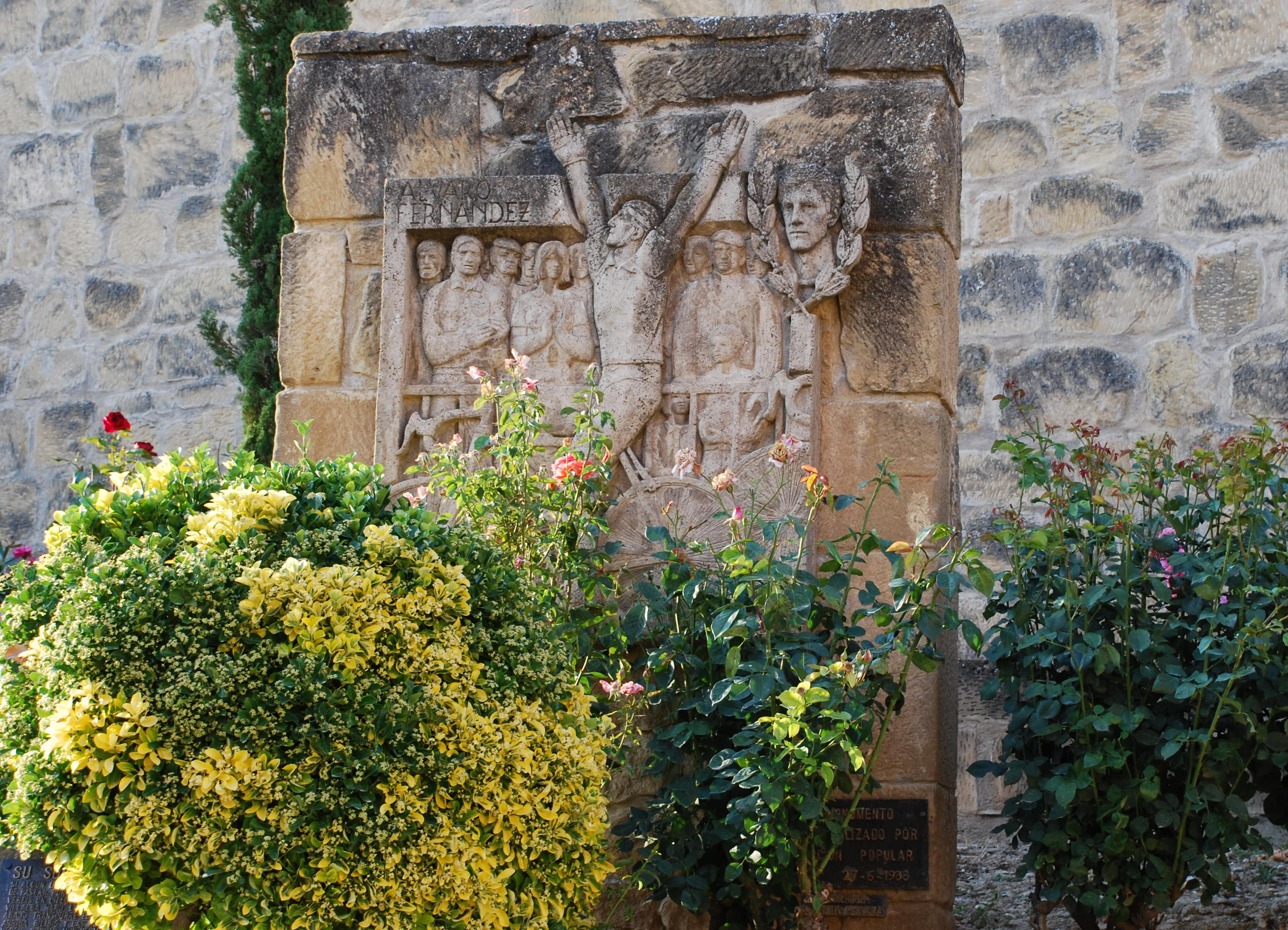
Memorial to Álvaro Férnandez.

==== Memorial to Alvaro Fernandez ====
There is a monument erected in memory of the cyclist Alvaro Fernandez. You can read some verses of Maria Piedad Mendizabal: "If you are lucky one day walking around my Rioja ..."

==== Rollo ====
The rollo is located in Mendoza City Square.

==== Hunting ground ====
The municipality's hunting includes quail, partridges, rabbits, hares, doves, as well as wild boar and roe deer.

== Local events ==
- June 26 and 27, celebrations in honor of San Pelayo. Taking advantage of coinciding with the celebrations of Haro, they also participate in the Battle of Wine. After the Battle of Wine they have lunch in Valtracones, and go to Haro.
- Sunday after the patron saint Nuestra Señora de Haro de la Vega (September 8), they honor their patron virgin Nuestra Señora la Virgen de los Remedios.
- Leisure activities
  - Hunting (both major and minor).
  - The village is one of the starting points for promotion to the Cross Motrico.

== Notable people ==
- Pedro del Castillo
