= Colos =

Colos may refer to:

- Colos (Odemira), a parish in the municipality of Odemira, Portugal
- Francois Colos (Ferencz Szalay; 1933–1989), Hungarian-born American designer and artist

== See also ==
- Colo (disambiguation)
- Kolos (disambiguation)
