= Battle of Lagunillas =

Battle

Coordinates: 36°50′50″S 73°05′41″W

- Part of Arauco War
Date	November 8, 1557
Location	Vicinity south of the mouth of the Bio-Bio River
Result	Spanish victory

Belligerents
Spanish Empire	Mapuches

Commanders and leaders
García Hurtado de Mendoza	Turcupichun

Strength
530 Spanish Cavalry, 200 arquebusiers, 5 artillery pieces 4,000 Indian auxiliaries	8,000 – 12,000 Mapuche

Casualties and losses
2 Spaniards killed and many seriously wounded	300 killed, 150 captured

The Battle of Lagunillas was a battle in the Arauco War on November 8, 1557, between the army of García Hurtado de Mendoza and the Mapuche army near some shallow lakes a league south of the Bio-Bio River.

== History ==
In anticipation of Mendoza's invasion of their territory, the Mapuche organized their defense by gathering their forces in three places; the first was a pucará on the height of Andalicán five leagues south of Concepcion covering the approach down the coast to Arauco. The rest of their forces gathered near Millarapue and Tucapel.

Mendoza's well-equipped army left Concepcion on 29 October to begin his campaign against the Mapuche and marched south to the mouth of the Bio-Bio River. There he camped and dispatched a small force five leagues upstream to cut wood and build rafts for a crossing. This was to draw the attention of the Mapuche while he made his real crossing using the boats of his fleet and special rafts constructed to carry his thousand horses quickly across the river. His deception was successful, and his whole army made an unopposed crossing at the river mouth.

Once his army was successfully across, he advanced a league further south to some small shallow lakes at the foot of the wooded mountains of Araucanía's Cordillera de Nahuelbuta. There he encamped while sending a small detachment of cavalry under Captain Reinoso to the south to reconnoiter his next day's march. When Reinoso's small force came in sight of the Mapuche force gathered on Andalicán, it was attacked by the Mapuche. Reinoso's force fell back before the advance of the Mapuche, attempting to delay them while he sent word back to Mendoza that the Mapuche were advancing on the army. Meanwhile, a pair of Spanish soldiers left camp without orders to gather some fruit in the nearby woods and discovered a large force of Mapuche waiting in ambush. One was killed but the other managed to escape and bring word to the camp of the proximity of their enemy.

Upon receiving word of the approach of the Mapuche from Captain Reinoso, the governor sent him a reinforcement of fifty of his cavalry and twenty arquebusiers under Rodrigo de Quiroga. Thus reinforced, captains Reinoso and Quiroga slowed the Mapuche advance through the marshes and ponds. With the alert about the approach of the warriors from the nearby Mapuche ambush, Mendoza rapidly organized his army for battle and repulsed their first onset. Soon Reinoso and Quiroga arrived to rejoin the army with the Mapuche from Andalicán close behind and a general engagement began.

Despite being outnumbered, the Spanish arquebusiers and artillery broke up the Mapuche attacks, and the cavalry exploited the disorder, driving the Mapuche back into a marsh seeking protection from the horsemen. However, the Spanish foot followed them into the marsh and after a stubborn resistance the Mapuche fled into the wooded hills behind the marsh. The Spaniards pursued cautiously, wary of ambush, and returned in the late afternoon with prisoners. Two Spaniards were killed, but many were seriously wounded, while three hundred Mapuche were killed in the battle and one hundred fifty were captured, including Galvarino.

Tried for insurrection, these prisoners were condemned to amputation of their right hand and nose; others like Galvarino had both hands cut off. Galvarino and the rest were then released as a lesson and warning for the rest of the Mapuche. Mendoza sent Galvarino to inform the toqui Caupolican of the number and quality of the people which had entered their land again, to put some fear into him, so that he might submit without coming to blows. The following day Mendoza advanced and captured the abandoned pucara on Andalicán. The following day the army pushed on and took the heights of Marihueñu, which was only lightly held, leaving the way into the province of Arauco open to their advance.

== Sources ==
Of these sources Pedro Mariño de Lobera and Alonso de Góngora Marmolejo are thought to have participated in the battle. While Jerónimo de Vivar was in Santiago compiling his history from others accounts.

- Jerónimo de Vivar, Crónica y relación copiosa y verdadera de los reinos de Chile (Chronicle and abundant and true relation of the kingdoms of Chile) ARTEHISTORIA REVISTA DIGITAL; Crónicas de América (on line in Spanish)
  - Capítulo CXXIX Que trata de cómo sabido por el general Francisco de Villagran la llegada de Lautaro a los términos de esta ciudad y de lo que en ella hizo
- de Góngora Marmolejo, Alonso, Historia de Todas las Cosas que han Acaecido en el Reino de Chile y de los que lo han gobernado (1536-1575) (History of All the Things that Have happened in the Kingdom of Chile and of those that have governed it (1536-1575)), University of Chile: Document Collections in complete texts: Cronicles (on line in Spanish)
  - Capítulo XXV. De cómo don García Ordenó compañías de a pie y de a caballo y de la orden que tuvo para pasar el río Biobío y la batalla que los indios le dieron
- Mariño de Lobera, Pedro, Crónica del Reino de Chile, escrita por el capitán Pedro Mariño de Lobera....reducido a nuevo método y estilo por el Padre Bartolomé de Escobar. Edición digital a partir de Crónicas del Reino de Chile Madrid, Atlas, 1960, pp. 227-562, (Biblioteca de Autores Españoles; 569-575). Biblioteca Virtual Miguel de Cervantes (on line in Spanish)
  - Libro 2 Capítulo III De la llegada de la gente española a donde estaba el gobernador, don García de Mendoza
- Diego Barros Arana, Historia general de Chile, Alicante: Biblioteca Virtual Miguel de Cervantes, 2000.
  - Tomo II, Parte II, Capítulo XVII Hurtado de Mendoza: campaña de Arauco. Fundación de Cañete y repoblación de Concepción (1557-1558)
