= Bahía del Carnero =

Bay in Bío Bío Region, Chile

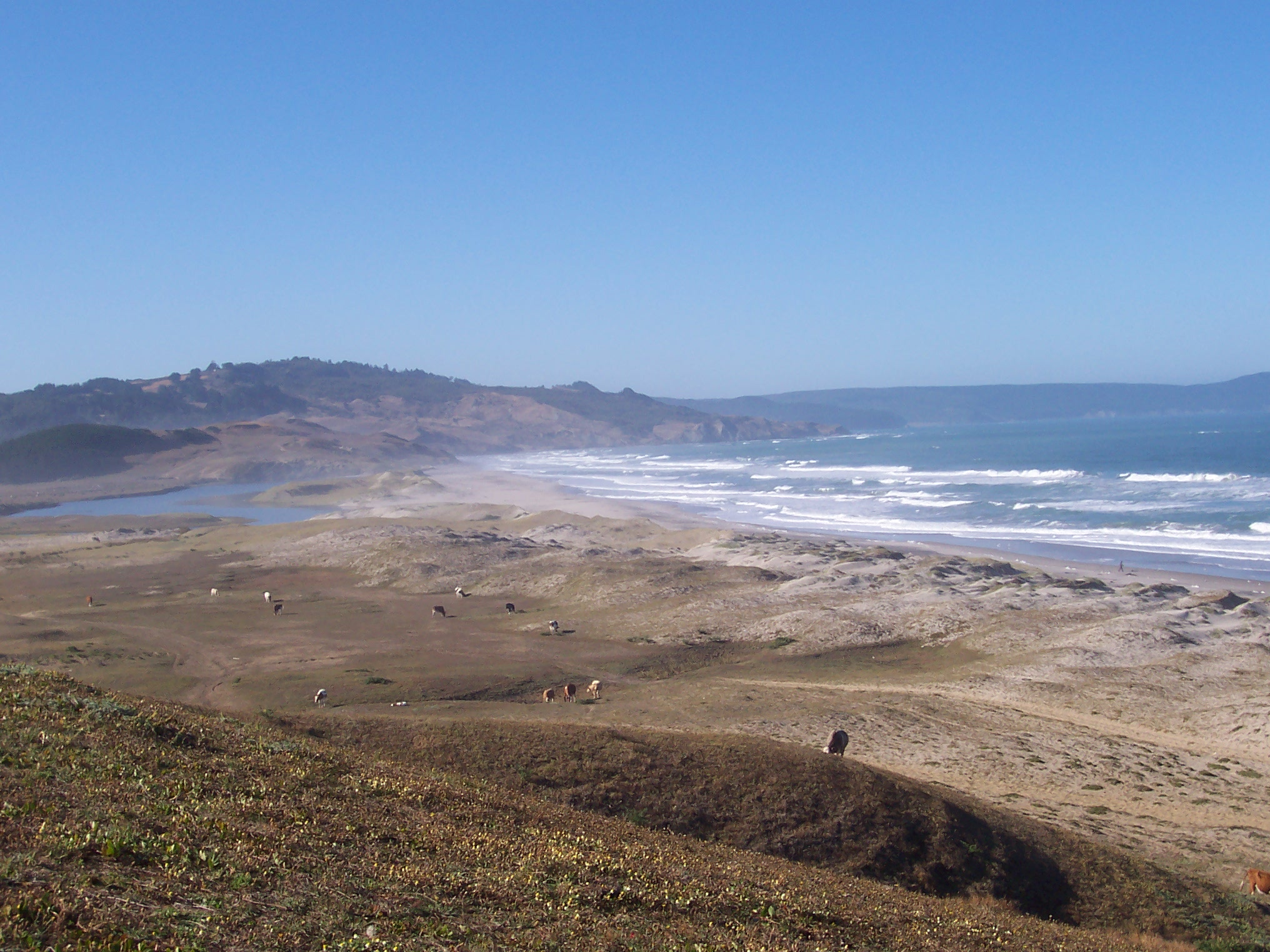
Bahia del Carnero and Quiapo River

Bahía del Carnero (Spanish: Bay of the Sheep) is a cove with little shelter on the coast of the Arauco Province, Bío Bío Region, Chile to the south of the Punta de Lavapié and north of Lebu at 37° 25' S. At its northern end it contains the mouth of Caleta Yani (Yani Creek)37°22′17.54″S 73°39′58.96″W and at the southern end, the Caleta Ranquil where it is protected by the promontory of Millonhue. Its coast is low and little forested, and drains the Quiapo River.

It was given its name by the crew of the ship of the expedition of Francisco de Camargo, that visited it in March 1540, and obtained from the Indians there a "sheep", the name they gave to the chillihueque or domesticated guanaco. The Mapudungun name of this cove was Alauquén, from av, "end", and lauquen, "the sea".

== Sources ==
- Francisco Solano Asta-Buruaga y Cienfuegos, Diccionario geográfico de la República de Chile (Geographic dictionary of the Republic of Chile), SEGUNDA EDICIÓN CORREGIDA Y AUMENTADA, NUEVA YORK, D. APPLETON Y COMPAÑÍA, 1899. pg. 127. Carnero (Bahía del).
