= Lincoyan =

Mapuche military chief

Lincoyan (c. 1519 Arauco - 1560 Cañete) was the Mapuche toqui that succeeded Ainavillo in 1550 after the defeat at the Battle of Penco. He tried to stop Pedro de Valdivia from invading and establishing fortresses and cities in their lands between 1551 and 1553 at the beginning of the Arauco War with no success. In 1551 he attacked Valdivia on the banks of the Andalien, but the neighboring fort resisted his assaults. During part of that year and in 1552 he continued fighting against Valdivia along Cauten River. In 1553, he was replaced by Caupolicán, but he was given the command of a division. In this year he took part in the capture of the fortresses of Arauco and Tucapel. Soon after this battle he defeated a strong Spanish force that came to protect Imperial. He followed Caupolicán in all his victories and in all his battles until the death of that chief in 1558. Afterward he continued the war against the Spaniards until he was killed in the Battle of Cañete.
