= Kolos, Novoalexandrovsky Selsoviet, Rubtsovsky District, Altai Krai =

Kolos Колос
- Passing loop
- Location within Altai Krai Location within Russia
- Coordinates: 51°23′N 81°08′E
- Country: Russia
- Region: Altai Krai
- District: Rubtsovsky District
- Time zone: UTC+7:00

Kolos (Russian: Колос) is a rural locality (a passing loop) in Novoalexandrovsky Selsoviet, Rubtsovsky District, Altai Krai, Russia. The population was 60 as of 2013. There is 1 street.

== Geography ==
Kolos is located 14 km south of Rubtsovsk (the district's administrative centre) by road. Kolos (settlement) is the nearest rural locality.
