= Quiapo River =

River in Chile

Coordinates: 37.4000°S 73.5333°W

The Quiapo River is a short river of small volume in Arauco Province, Chile, near its coast. Its headwaters are formed at the junction of two steams at the heights of Quiapo. These streams arise in the forested heights to the north and east some kilometers south of Arauco. It flows into the Bahia del Carnero north of Lebu.

== Sources ==
- Francisco Solano Asta-Buruaga y Cienfuegos, Diccionario geográfico de la República de Chile (Geographic dictionary of the Republic of Chile), SEGUNDA EDICIÓN CORREGIDA Y AUMENTADA, NUEVA YORK, D. APPLETON Y COMPAÑÍA, 1899. pg. 613.
