= Colo Halit =

Swedish footballer

Personal information
- Full name: Colo Halit Ahmet
- Date of birth: 1 January 1986 (age 40)
- Positions: Midfielder; winger

Senior career*
Years	Team	Apps	(Gls)
-2003	IK Brage	5	(0)
2004	Lyn Fotball	7	(0)
-2008	IK Brage	2+	(0+)
2009-2012	Dalkurd FF	25	(0)
2013-2015	Forssa BK	20	(0)
2019	Bullermyrens IK	3	(0)
2020-	Amsbergs SK	8	(0)
- * Club domestic league appearances and goals

Colo Halit Ahmet (born 1 January 1986) is a Swedish retired footballer.

== Career ==
After trialing with Manchester United, one of the most successful English clubs, Tottenham Hotspur and Ipswich Town, Halit signed for Lyn Fotball in the Norwegian top flight.

By 2013, he was playing in the Swedish sixth division with Forssa BK
