= Pedro del Castillo =

Spanish conquistador

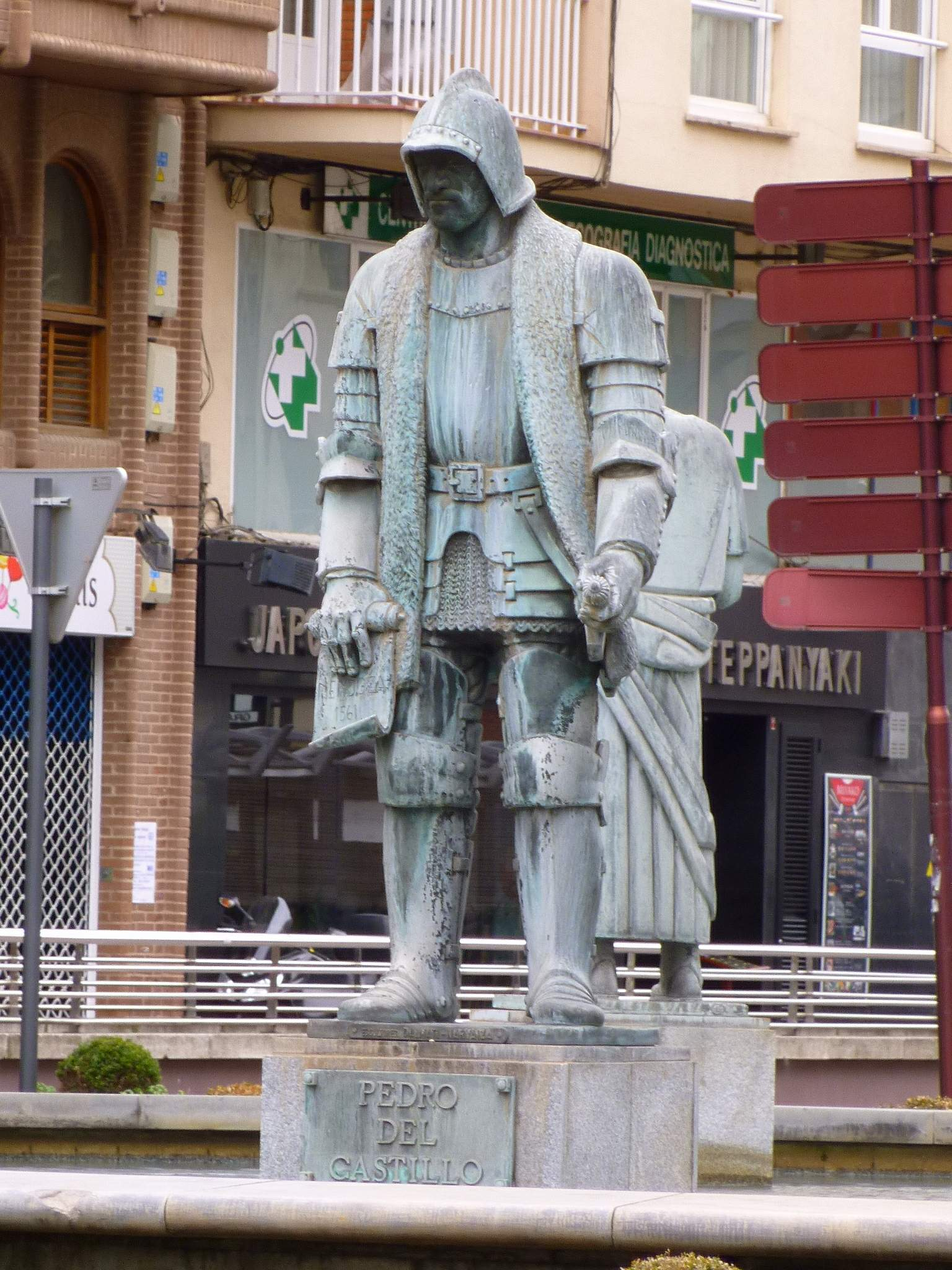
Statue of Pedro del Castillo at Logroño, Spain

Pedro del Castillo (Villalba de Rioja, 1521 - Panama City, 28 March 1569) was a Spanish conquistador.

== Biography ==
After acting as corregidor in some recently founded American towns, he was in Chile at the orders of Francisco de Villagra, with whom he took part in the Arauco War.

In November 1560 he was appointed by the Governor of Chile, García Hurtado de Mendoza, as capitán general y teniente gobernador para poblar, fundar, repartir tierras y encomendar indios en la provincia de Cuyo (commander-in-chief and plenipotentiary for the province of Cuyo), in what is now western Argentina. Castillo organized an expedition that crossed the Andes, passing through the Aconcagua and Uspallata valleys, reaching the Huentata valley on 22 February.

On 2 March 1561, Pedro del Castillo founded the city of Mendoza. Some time later, he was sent to Lima, Peru, and afterwards he established himself in Panama. He died in Panama City in 1569.
