= Juan de Pineda =

Spanish historian and writer

Juan de Pineda (Medina del Campo c. 1520 - Medina del Campo c. 1599) was a writer and a historian of the Spanish Golden Age. After graduating from the University of Salamanca in 1540, he became a Franciscan. Perhaps his most notable work is Monarchia Ecclesiastica (first published in Zaragoza in 1576, then in Salamanca in 1588), in total thirty books in five volumes, which took him some twenty years to write. It covers the history of the known world at the time.

== Selected works ==
- Monarchia Ecclesiastica. Salamanca: Oficina de Juan Fernandez. 1588. (Note: Online at the Munich Digitization Center: Part 1 (vol. 1), Part 1 (vol. 2), Part 2, Part 3, Part 4, Part 5)
- Agricultura Christiana, que contiene XXXV diálogos familiares. Salamanca. 1589.
