= Kolos, Rubtsovsky Selsoviet, Rubtsovsky District, Altai Krai =

Kolos Колос
- Settlement
- Location within Altai Krai Location within Russia
- Coordinates: 51°25′N 81°08′E
- Country: Russia
- Region: Altai Krai
- District: Rubtsovsky District
- Time zone: UTC+7:00

Kolos (Russian: Колос) is a rural locality (a settlement) in Rubtsovsky Selsoviet, Rubtsovsky District, Altai Krai, Russia. The population was 432 as of 2013. There are 6 streets.

== Geography ==
Kolos is located 12 km southwest of Rubtsovsk (the district's administrative centre) by road. Kolos (passing loop) is the nearest rural locality.
