= Andalicán =

Coordinates: 37.15678°S 73.17958°W

Andalicán during the era of conquest and colonial times in Chile was the name of the high hill in the middle of two ravines and site of a fortress built by the Mapuche in 1557 to prevent García Hurtado de Mendoza from invading La Araucanía north of Marihueñu and the valley of Colcura. This height overlooks the location of the modern city of Lota in Concepción Province of the Bío Bío Region of Chile.

Andalicán is also a hill or promontory now in the northern part of the Arauco Province in the Bio-Bio Region of Chile. It is the end of a long low ridge that starts in the mountains to the east and ends in a promontory on the coast extending into the Bay of Arauco to the north of the mouth of the Laraquete River. It has steep slopes and is covered with tall trees. It lies immediately to the south of Marihueñu and the valley of Chivilingo. Through Andalicán lies the road between Lota and the city of Arauco.

Andalicán is also the name given to the region along the banks of the Laraquete River. This was the location of the rehue of Andalicán a part of the Moluche aillarehue of Arauco.

== Sources ==
- Francisco Solano Asta-Buruaga y Cienfuegos, Diccionario geográfico de la República de Chile, SEGUNDA EDICIÓN CORREGIDA Y AUMENTADA, NUEVA YORK, D. APPLETON Y COMPAÑÍA. 1899. pg. 31
- Crónica y relación copiosa y verdadera de los reinos de Chile (Chronicle and abundant and true relation of the kingdoms of Chile) Jerónimo de Vivar, ARTEHISTORIA REVISTA DIGITAL; Crónicas de América (in Spanish)
