= Battle of Millarapue =

1557 battle in Chile's Arauco War

- Part of Arauco War
Date	November 30, 1557
Location	Vicinity of Millarapue, Arauco, Chile
Result	Spanish victory

Belligerents
Spanish Empire	Mapuches

Commanders and leaders
García Hurtado de Mendoza	Caupolicán; Turcupichun

Strength
More than 600 Spaniards	More than 20,000 Mapuche

Casualties and losses
Some wounded and many horses dead.	3,000 killed, 800 captured most badly injured.

The Battle of Millarapue that occurred November 30, 1557 was intended by the Toqui Caupolicán as a Mapuche ambush of the Spanish army of García Hurtado de Mendoza that resulted in a Spanish victory when the ambush failed.

== History ==
After the victory of the Spanish arms in the Battle of Lagunillas, Mendoza went into the hostile territory of Arauco looking for a decisive battle. The Spanish royal forces encamped at Millarapue on November 29. The Mapuche army under Caupolicán tried an ambush at dawn on November 30, attempting to surprise the enemy camp. That day was the day of San Andres celebrated among the Spaniards and a celebratory morning call of trumpets was interpreted by the Araucanians as an alarm. Believing their ambush detected Caupolicán ordered his army to advance to the attack. Leading some Mapuche warriors from the front was Galvarino, with his handless arms urging on his comrades. The battle was brutal and fierce. The Battle of Millarapue lasted from dawn to early afternoon. Finally the Mapuches were defeated, losing 3,000 dead and 800 captured. Captured leaders were hanged, and Galvarino, captured again, was thrown to the dogs. Following the victory the Spanish advanced to Tucapel and settled down to build the fort of Cañete, not very far from where Pedro de Valdivia's old fort of Tucapel had been located.

== Additional information ==
=== Sources ===
- Jerónimo de Vivar, Crónica y relación copiosa y verdadera de los reinos de Chile (Chronicle and abundant and true relation of the kingdoms of Chile) ARTEHISTORIA REVISTA DIGITAL; Crónicas de América (on line in Spanish)
  - Capítulo CXXXIII Que trata de la salida del gobernador de la provincia de Arauco para la de Tucapel y lo que en este camino le sucedió
- de Góngora Marmolejo, Alonso, Historia de Todas las Cosas que han Acaecido en el Reino de Chile y de los que lo han gobernado (1536-1575) (History of All the Things that Have happened in the Kingdom of Chile and of those that have governed it (1536-1575)), Edición digital a partir de Crónicas del Reino de Chile, Madrid, Atlas, 1960, pp. 75–224, (Biblioteca de Autores Españoles; 565-568).
  - XXVI. De como salio el campo de Arauco para ir a Tucapel y de la batalla que le dieron los indios en Millarapue.
- Mariño de Lobera, Pedro, Crónica del Reino de Chile, escrita por el capitán Pedro Mariño de Lobera....reducido a nuevo método y estilo por el Padre Bartolomé de Escobar. Edición digital a partir de Crónicas del Reino de Chile Madrid, Atlas, 1960, pp. 227-562, (Biblioteca de Autores Españoles; 569-575). Biblioteca Virtual Miguel de Cervantes (on line in Spanish)
  - Libro 2, Capítulo IV. De la entrada que el gobernador, don García de Mendoza, hizo en los estados de Arauco y la memorable batalla que tuvo con los indios en Millapoa
- Diego de Rosales, “Historia General del Reino de Chile”, Flandes Indiano, 3 tomos. Valparaíso 1877 - 1878.
  - Historia general de el Reyno de Chile: Flandes Indiano, Tomo II (1554–1625)
    - Capitulo XIV. Batalla que tubo Don Garcia con Caupolican y Turcupichun y insigne Victoria que alcanzó.
