= Chilean ship Colo Colo =

Five ships of the Chilean Navy have been named after the Mapuche leader Colo Colo:

- Chilean schooner Colo Colo (1830), a brigantine of 140 t formerly named Flora
- Chilean torpedo boat Colo Colo (1880), a Colo Colo-class torpedo boat of 5 or 30 tons which was transported to the Titicaca Lake during the War of the Pacific
- Chilean minelayer Colo Colo (1917), a Golub-class guard ship of 540 t
- Chilean tug Colo Colo (1931), (ATA 73) a tug of 760 t, now a museum ship in Punta Arenas
- Colo Colo (1972), a tug, formerly RAM Lenga

== See also ==
- List of decommissioned ships of the Chilean Navy
- Colocolo (disambiguation)
