= Battle of Quiapo =

1558 battle of the Arauco War

Coordinates: 37°26′22.92″S 73°35′9.50″W

- Part of Arauco War
Date	December 13, 1558
Location	Vicinity of Quiapo, Arauco Province, Chile
Result	Spanish victory

Belligerents
Spanish Empire	Mapuches

Commanders and leaders
García Hurtado de Mendoza	Lemucaguin or Caupolicán the younger

Strength
200	7,000 – 8,000

Casualties and losses
?	300 killed many captured

Battle of Quiapo in the Arauco War was the final battle in the campaign of García Hurtado de Mendoza against the Mapuche under the toqui known as Lemucaguin or Caupolicán the younger. It was fought in Quiapo, in the region nowadays known as Arauco Province, Chile on December 13, 1558. The importance of this battle was that it was the first time that the Mapuche fought using a squad that carried firearms.

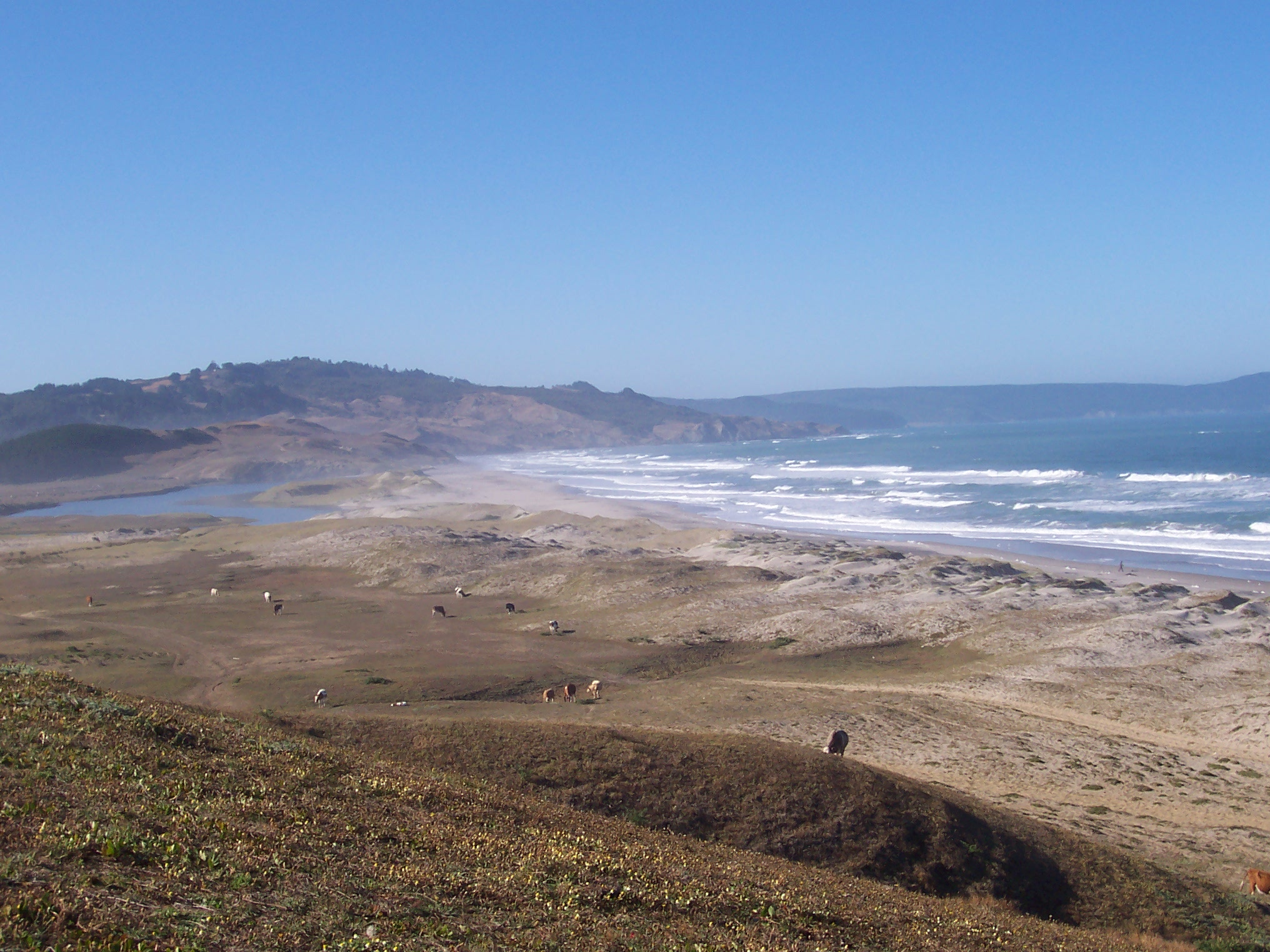
Quiapo River

== Sources ==
- Jerónimo de Vivar, Crónica y relación copiosa y verdadera de los reinos de Chile (Chronicle and abundant and true relation of the kingdoms of Chile) ARTEHISTORIA REVISTA DIGITAL; Crónicas de América (on line in Spanish)
  - Capítulo CXLII Que trata de lo que hizo el gobernador don García Hurtado de Mendoza estando en la ciudad Imperial invernando e de cómo salió para la ciudad de Cañete
- de Góngora Marmolejo, Alonso, Historia de Todas las Cosas que han Acaecido en el Reino de Chile y de los que lo han gobernado (1536-1575) (History of All the Things that Have happened in the Kingdom of Chile and of those that have governed it (1536-1575)), Edición digital a partir de Crónicas del Reino de Chile, Madrid, Atlas, 1960, pp. 75–224, (Biblioteca de Autores Españoles; 565-568).
  - Capítulo XXX De cómo don García llegó a Cañete y de las cosas que hizo, y de cómo desbarató el fuerte que los indios tenían hecho en Quiapo, y del castigo que en ellos hizo.
- Mariño de Lobera, Pedro, Crónica del Reino de Chile, escrita por el capitán Pedro Mariño de Lobera....reducido a nuevo método y estilo por el Padre Bartolomé de Escobar. Edición digital a partir de Crónicas del Reino de Chile Madrid, Atlas, 1960, pp. 227-562, (Biblioteca de Autores Españoles; 569-575). Biblioteca Virtual Miguel de Cervantes (on line in Spanish)
  - Libro 2, Capítulo XI, De la entrada del gobernador en la Imperial, y la insigne victoria que alcanzó en la memorable batalla en que fué desbaratado el fuerte Quiapo y la que hubo en la ciudad de Cañete. Y la prisión de Caupolicán en la quebrada.
- Diego de Rosales Historia general de el Reino de Chile, Flandes Indiano, Tomo II, Benjamín Vicuña Mackenna, Impr. del Mercurio, Valparaiso, 1878.
  - Libro IV, Cap. XXI Como los indios aprendieron a disparar arcabuzes y hizieron un fuerte en Quiapo; gánansele los españoles y dan la paz al vencedor Don Garcia.
- The Geographical, Natural, and Civil History of Chili By Don Juan Ignatius Molina, Longman, Hurst, Rees, and Orme, Paternoster-Row, London, 1809
