= Quiapo, Chile =

Place in Arauco Province, Chile

Coordinates: 37.1488°S 73.5841°W

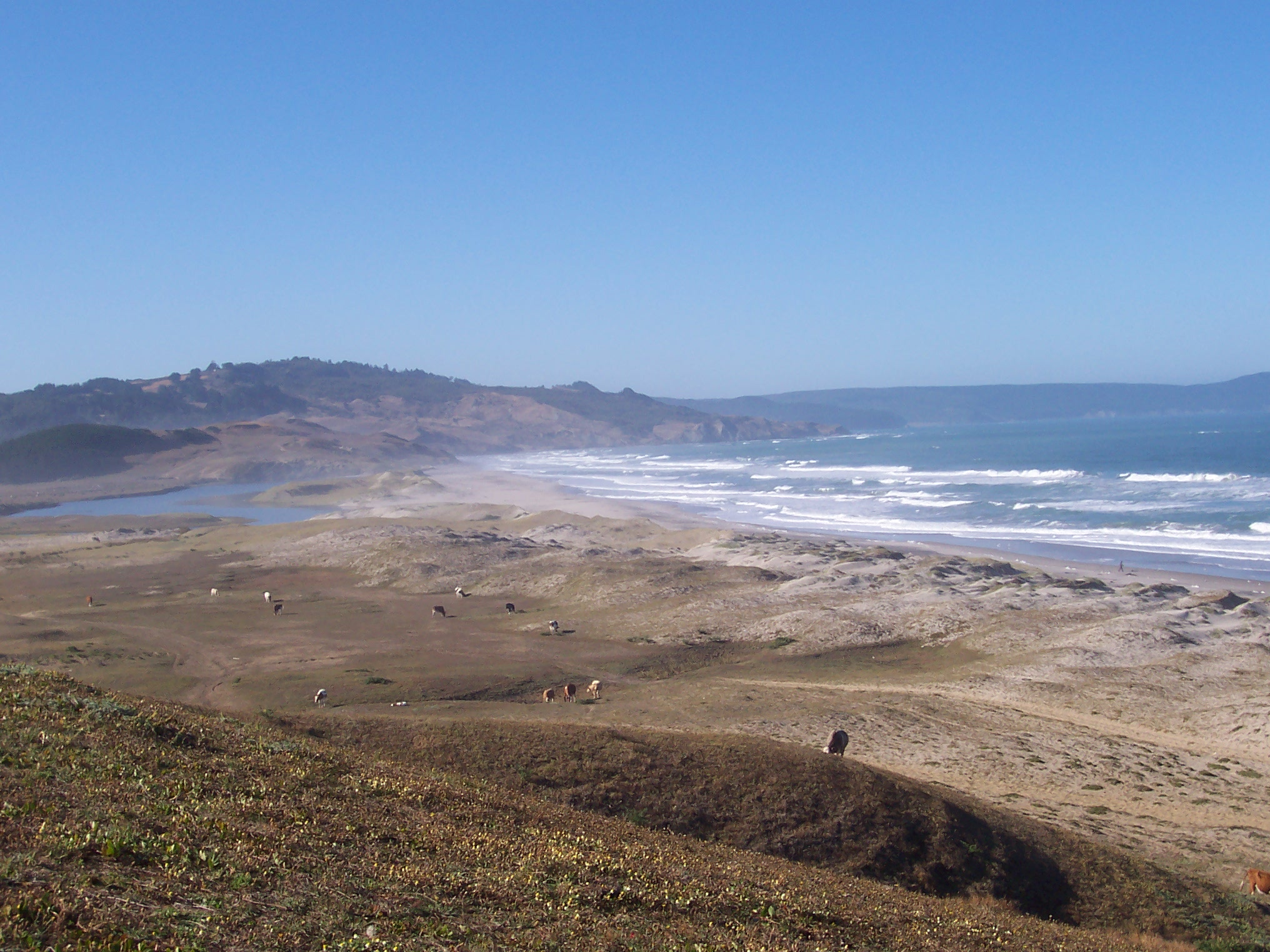
Locobe beach, Arauco, Chile

Quiapo (Mapudungun; cuya=lesser grison and mapu=land) is a place in Arauco Province of Chile that is 25 kilometers to the southwest of Arauco and about 25 kilometers to the north and east of the port of Lebu to the east of the Bahia del Carnero and 6.4 kilometers west of the small town of Villa Alegre. It was a low mountainous and thickly wooded area, that contained among its contours arable lands that had the same name. It is also the location where two streams come together to form the headwaters of the Quiapo River.

In the Arauco War, the hills at the confluence of the two streams was the location of the fortress built by the Mapuche Toqui Lemucaguin or Caupolicán the younger, to block the northward advance of García Hurtado de Mendoza, Marquis of Cañete into the Arauco area and site of the 1558 Battle of Quiapo.

In 1566 the governor Rodrigo de Quiroga built a small fort on this site that was destroyed by the Mapuche several times and abandoned some years later. The name, altered to Quiapo and Quipco by the Spanish, was originally the Mapudungun Cuyapu or Cuyamapu, meaning cuya, weasel and mapu land.

== Sources ==
- Francisco Solano Asta-Buruaga y Cienfuegos, Diccionario geográfico de la República de Chile, SEGUNDA EDICIÓN CORREGIDA Y AUMENTADA, NUEVA YORK, D. APPLETON Y COMPAÑÍA. 1899. p. 613-14
