= García Hurtado de Mendoza, 5th Marquis of Cañete =

Royal Governor of Chile (1535–1609)

Don García Hurtado de Mendoza Marqués de Cañete Caballero de Santiago
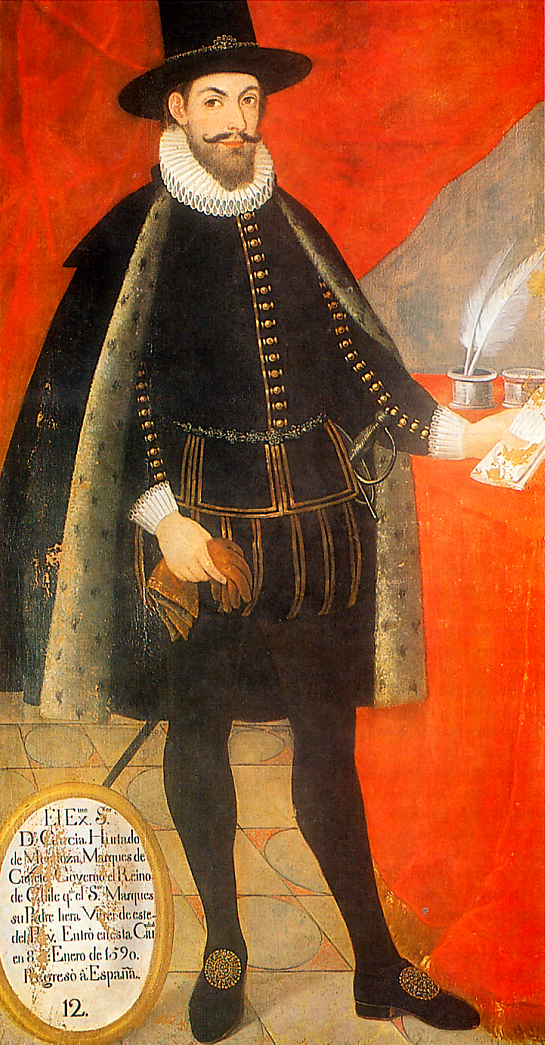

Royal Governor of Chile
- In office 1557–1561
- Monarch: Philip II
- Preceded by: Francisco de Aguirre; Rodrigo de Quiroga; Francisco de Villagra
- Succeeded by: Francisco de Villagra

8th Viceroy of Peru
- In office January 8, 1590 – July 24, 1596
- Monarch: Philip II
- Preceded by: Fernando Torres de Portugal
- Succeeded by: Luis de Velasco

Personal details
- Born: 21 July 1535 Cuenca, Spain
- Died: 19 May 1609 (aged 73) Madrid, Spain
- Spouse: María Manrique
- Children: Maricar Mendoza Carla Mendoza

Military service
- Allegiance: Spain
- Years of service: 1552–1609
- Battles/wars: Italian War of 1551–59: Invasion of Corsica; Battle of Renty; Conquest of Chile-Arauco War: Battle of Lagunillas; Battle of Millarapue; Battle of Quiapo

García Hurtado de Mendoza y Manrique, 5th Marquis of Cañete (July 21, 1535 – May 19, 1609) was a Spanish Governor of Chile, and later Viceroy of Peru (from January 8, 1590 to July 24, 1596). He is often known simply as "Marquis of Cañete". Belonging to an influential family of Spanish noblemen, Hurtado de Mendoza successfully fought in the Arauco War during his stay as Governor of Chile. The city of Mendoza is named after him. In his later position as Viceroy of Peru he sponsored Álvaro de Mendaña's transpacific expedition of 1595, who named the Marquesas Islands after him.

== Early life ==
He was the son of Andrés Hurtado de Mendoza, 3rd Marquis of Cañete — also a viceroy of Peru — and Magdalena Manrique, daughter of the Count of Osorno. Both his parents belonged to some of the most influential families in the Spanish aristocracy.

In 1552 Hurtado de Mendoza ran away from home with the intention of serving his king, Charles I (Emperor Charles V), in an expedition the latter was preparing against Corsica. Hurtado de Mendoza demonstrated great efficiency in this campaign and also in Tuscany, when that duchy attempted to throw off Imperial rule. He was part of the Imperial army in Brussels, and was with Charles V during his defeat in the Battle of Renty.

Upon learning that his father had been designated viceroy of Peru, he returned to Spain and asked to be sent to America. During the journey he met Jerónimo de Alderete, who had been chosen by the king to be the successor of Pedro de Valdivia as governor of Chile. It happened that Alderete became sick and died during the trip. Hurtado's father gathered together a group of Chilean representatives, and, taking advantage of a disagreement on whether Francisco de Aguirre or Francisco de Villagra was more qualified as a successor for the post, put forward his son. He hoped that his son would bring more Spaniards to Chile, and additionally be able to unify the two camps in the battle for the post of governor of Chile. And he hoped he could deal successfully with the rebellious Indians.

Thus Hurtado left for Chile, 21 years old, with proven ruthlessness. He was haughty, proud of his lineage and intelligence, authoritarian in outlook, and subject to violent outbreaks. His character made enemies, mostly hidden, even within his own circle.

== Governor of Chile ==
Hurtado de Mendoza left Peru for Chile at the head of a force of 500 Spaniards. A part of this force traveled overland under the command of Luis de Toledo and Pedro del Castillo. This group left in January 1557. The other part, under the command of the new governor, more comfortably traveled by sea, leaving in February of the same year. The viceroy gave a banquet for his son, after which the fleet left port to the sound of military marches and a salute of cannons.

Hurtado de Mendoza sailed with an entourage of illustrious men, including Alonso de Ercilla y Zúñiga, Francisco de Irarrázaval y Andía, Francisco Pérez de Valenzuela, Friar Gil González de San Nicolás, the Franciscan Juan Gallegos and the learned jurist Hernando de Santillán. The expedition stopped in Arica on April 5, 1557 and remained there until the ninth of that month.

Continuing the voyage to the south, they disembarked at La Serena on April 23, 1557. The poor people of Coquimbo were amazed at the largest contingent of soldiers — more than 500 — ever seen in those parts, armed with harquebuses and cannons, wearing armor and crests of plumes. They soon acquired the nickname of emplumados (feathered ones).

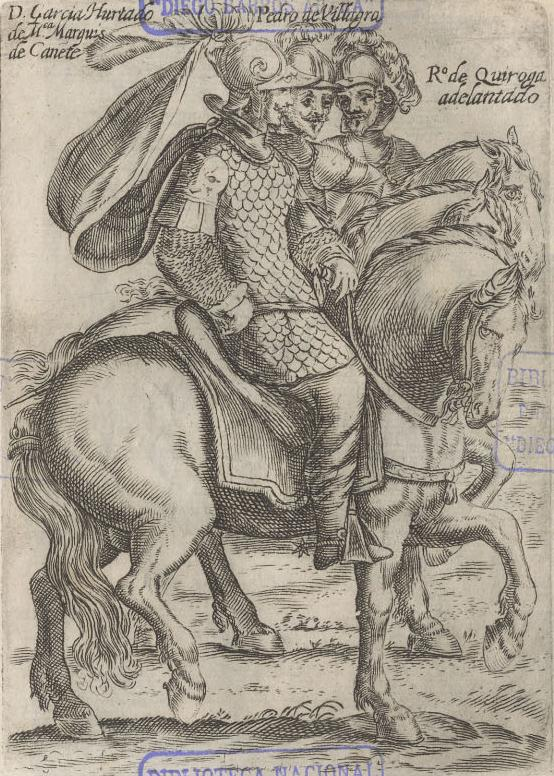
Mendoza, Villagra y Quiroga in an illustration by Alonso de Ovalle

=== Francisco de Aguirre and Francisco de Villagra ===
Francisco de Aguirre received the new governor hospitably in La Serena. At about the same time, Francisco de Villagra arrived in La Serena by land. Knowing the animosity between Aguirre and Villagra over their aspirations to the governorship of Chile, García Hurtado did not hesitate to take both of them prisoner in La Serena, isolating them on a ship. This act was considered very unjust by the Spanish settlers in Chile.

Mariño de Lobera relates in his chronicle that Aguirre, already aboard, greeted Villagra upon his arrival, shook his hand, and said:

See, Your Honor, Señor General, how are the things of the world: Yesterday the two of us did not fit in one large kingdom, and today Don García has made us fit on a single plank.

The governor arrived at Santiago as winter approached. The cabildo (city council) was making preparations to welcome him, but Hurtado decided to continue by sea to Concepción, in spite of the contrary advice of those who knew the dangers of the climate at this season. At Coquimbo he sent the cavalry on by land. Hurtado sailed on June 21, 1557, in full winter.

=== Relations with indigenous peoples ===
He arrived eight days later in the bay of Concepción in the middle of a dangerous season. During a torrential rainstorm the troops disembarked on the island of La Quiriquina and erected a provisional encampment. Once settled in Concepción, Hurtado attempted a policy of good will towards the Indians, who had accepted the rule of the governor but were not ready to accept the occupation of their territories by the newly arrived Spaniards.

Lincoyan and other Indigenous leaders knew that the cavalry was coming by land from Santiago and conceived a plan to attack them at Andalicán, near Concepción. Hurtado learned of the Indigenous plan and was informed that the Mapuches interpreted his attitude as a sign of weakness and fear; he decided therefore to radically change his attitude toward them.

He ordered that the fort of San Luis de Toledo be built immediately in Araucana to frustrate the Indigenous initiative, but the fort was soon attacked by the Mapuches. They were defeated, and the governor counterattacked with his cannons and harquebuses.

He ordered a new campaign in October 1557, with a strong force of 500 soldiers and thousands of Indian auxiliaries. The Battle of Lagunillas occurred during this campaign, on November 7. In this battle the Spanish survived largely because of the valor demonstrated by Rodrigo de Quiroga and the other captains. The Mapuches showed themselves disorganized in the attack, and this disorder produced bad tactics that prevented a victory.

According to Alonso de Ercilla, who had arrived in Chile with the governor, the Spanish took prisoner the Indigenous leader Galvarino and cut off his left hand. He lost the hand without a grimace of pain and then extended the other, which the Spanish also cut off. He asked for death, but the conquistadors let him go. He left with his men, planning his revenge.

Galvarino ordered a new attack on the invaders on November 30. This was the Battle of Millarapue, in the valley of the same name. There were many fortuitous events in this battle that facilitated the surprise attack. Nevertheless, the Mapuches were defeated again, and as punishment 30 of them were hanged by the Spanish, including Galvarino, who had fought always in the first line.

The hardships of the struggle began to bother the companions of Hurtado, who had hoped to gain riches for their services. In order to redistribute them to his followers, the governor declared the encomiendas of Concepción vacant. For this reason, the city was refounded for a third time. A short time later, the city of Cañete de la Frontera was also founded, and was also divided among the troops returning from the battle.

The Mapuche leader Caupolicán, instigated by the Indian Andresillo, decided to attack Fort Tucapel. However, Andresillo was a traitor who communicated the details of the attack to the Spanish, so that the attackers were transformed into the attacked. The result was a flight by the Indigenous, who left behind many dead and wounded, and a serious weakening of the Indigenous forces.

The morale of the Spanish rose. In a surprise assault on the encampment of Caupolicán, they were able to capture him. He was conducted to Fort Tucapel. Some historians claim that he tried to deal with the Spanish, promising to convert to Christianity, but Alonso de Reinoso, the commander of the fort, condemned him to death by impalement.

In another battle, the Indigenous built a fort at Quiapo, between Cañete and Arauco, but they were again defeated in the Battle of Quiapo. The city of Concepción and fort Arauco were rebuilt in 1559. Other forts were founded, with the name of San Andrés de Angol, or Los Infantes and fort Talcamávida in 1560 and on the other side of the Andes the city of Mendoza in 1561.

=== Aftermath of the war ===
At this time, Hurtado de Mendoza was despised by those he had robbed. His wrathful character and his pride gained him many enemies, including Hernando de Santillán. Santillán had established the Tasa de Santillán, which regulated Indian servitude, permitting many Spaniards to abuse the Indigenous. It planted the seeds of future rebellions, in particular that of the Huilliches.

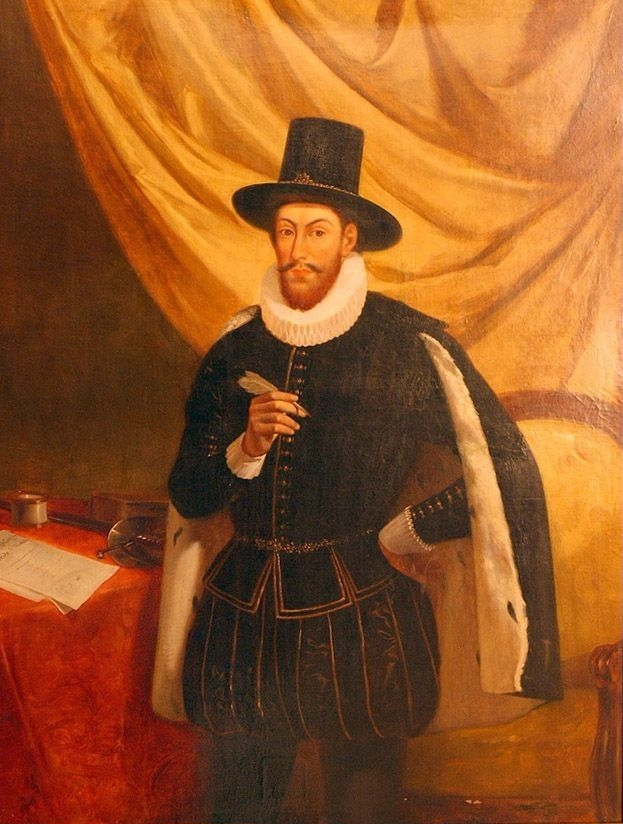
García Hurtado de Mendoza

Sometime later, the governor was informed that his father the viceroy had been replaced by the king and that Francisco de Villagra had been designated governor of Chile. Hurtado expected to receive the same humiliations from Villagra that he had inflicted upon him, and for this reason he decided to leave Chile quickly. He first went to Santiago, a place he had not visited during his government.

In Santiago he was informed of the death of the successor of his father. This meant that his father would continue as viceroy, at least temporarily, and for that reason Hurtado decided to stay on as governor. He remained in the capital and took the opportunity to have a gentlemanly interview with Villagra about the state of the colony. Villagra did not humiliate him as he expected, receiving him with a cold but polite demeanor.

During his stay in Santiago the Tasa de Santillán was published. It established the system of mita (forced Indigenous labor). Instead of requiring labor from all the Indians in a village, this system established a rotation of servitude, obligating the chief of each tribe to send one man of each six to work in the mines, and one of each five to work in the fields. These workers, who up to now had been unpaid, were to be remunerated with a sixth part of the product of their labor, and this salary was required to be paid regularly, at the end of each month. Females and males under 18 years of age or over 50 were exempt from the mita, and it was ordered that the Indigenous be fed, maintained in health, and evangelized by the encomenderos (Spanish holders of the encomiendas).

Hurtado de Mendoza received news of the impending death of his father. He decided to leave immediately for Peru, designating Rodrigo de Quiroga interim governor (rather than Villagra).

=== Juicio de residencia ===
In Peru he was subject to a juicio de residencia for the arbitrary actions of his government in Chile (the confiscation of the encomiendas, the mistreatment of the soldiers, etc.). He was the first governor of Chile whose performance was judged under the laws of Spain. The tribunal found him guilty of 196 charges, but it left formal sentencing to the Royal Audiencia of Lima. The sentence was that he be detained within the city of Lima, until he was absolved of all accusations or he paid the fines to which he was condemned.

== Return to Spain ==
However, Hurtado de Mendoza had already left Peru for Spain, to give his account of his campaigns and his government to King Philip II and the Council of the Indies. The prestige of his family, the information about his services given by the Audiencia of Lima, and the recommendations from some faithful captains that began to arrive from Chile caused the accusations of his enemies to be soon forgotten. Besides, he was recognized as the winner of the War of Arauco. This belittled the old conquistadors with the false claim that they had not done enough to suppress the Indian rebellions and pacify the Araucanía.

In Madrid he entered into the Royal Guard. He was also representative to the king in Milan.

== Viceroy of Peru ==
In 1590 Hurtado returned to America, now as Viceroy of Peru, a position he held until the middle of the following decade.

Hurtado had frequent disagreements with Turibius de Mongrovejo, Archbishop of Lima, whenever civil and ecclesiastical jurisdiction conflicted. The seminary school established by Mogrovejo was not established without a fight over whether to put the bishop's coat of arms on top of the entrance, or the royal coat of arms in the same place, as well as during the excommunication of Juan Ortiz de Zárate, mayor of Lima, over the forced arrest of a criminal who had taken refuge at a church.

At the end of his term, Hurtado left Lima to return to Spain, where he died in 1609.

== Legacy ==
Hurtado's legacy includes his attempt to "crack down on the oppression of the indigenous population at the hands of the Spanish colonizers." Five years after his death, in 1614, his "Ordinances Issued by the Marquis of Cañete, Viceroy of the Kingdom of Peru, as a Remedy for the Excesses that the Judges of the Natives Commit When They Deal and Bargain with the Indians and the Damages as well as the Grievances that the Indians Endure" were published posthumously in Lima, Peru. The national sport of Chile, the Chilean rodeo, is derived from Garcia Hurtado de Mendoza's order to brand all the cattle of Chile. The annual branding event held at Santiago's Plaza de Armas eventually became the modern day Chilean rodeo.

== Ancestry ==
8. Honorato de Mendoza
4. Diego Hurtado de Mendoza; 2nd Marquis of Cañete
9. Francisca de Silva
2. Andrés Hurtado de Mendoza; 3rd Marquis of Cañete
10. Andrés de Cabrera; 1st Marquis of Moya
5. Isabel de Cabrera
11. Beatriz de Bobadilla
1. García Hurtado de Mendoza
12. Pedro Fernández Manrique; 2nd Count de Osorno
6. García Fernández Manrique; 3rd Count of Osorno
13. Teresa de Toledo
3. Magdalena Manrique
14. Alvaro de Luna; 2nd Lord of Fuentidueña
7. María de Luna
15. Isabel de Bobadilla

== Additional information ==
=== Sources ===
- Castro Pereira Mouzinho de Albuquerque e Cunha, Fernando de (1995). Instrumentário Genealógico - Linhagens Milenárias (in Portuguese). pp. 329–30.
- Hobbs, Nicolas (2007). "Grandes de España" (in Spanish).
- Instituto de Salazar y Castro. Elenco de Grandezas y Titulos Nobiliarios Españoles (in Spanish). periodic publication.

Government offices
Preceded by Francisco de Villagra	Royal Governor of Chile; 1557–1561	Succeeded by Francisco de Villagra
Preceded by Fernando; Torres de Portugal	Viceroy of Peru; 1590–1596	Succeeded by The Marquis of Salinas
Spanish nobility
Preceded by Diego; Hurtado de Mendoza	Marquis of Cañete; 1561–1609	Succeeded by Juan Andrés; Hurtado de Mendoza
