= Juan Jufré =

Spanish conquistador

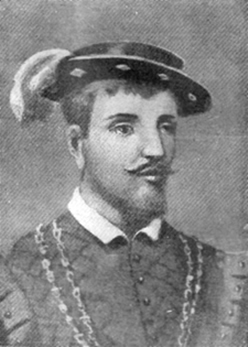
- Juan Jufré
- Born: 1516; Medina de Rioseco
- Died: 1578 (aged 61–62); Santiago
- Occupations: conquistador, administrator

Juan Jufré de Loayza y Montesa (1516–1578) was a Spanish conquistador who participated in the 1541 expedition of Pedro de Valdivia to Chile. He was the first alcalde of Santiago, Chile (in 1541) and held the position of governor of the Argentine province of Cuyo. He founded the city of San Juan de la Frontera and re-founded the city of Mendoza.

== Career ==
Jufré was born in Medina de Rioseco, a municipality of Valladolid, to Francisco Jufré de Loayza and Cándida de Montesa. In 1538, he arrived in the Americas with Captain Juan Martin de Candia, younger brother of Pedro de Candia, and they traveled from Panama to Peru, soon moving to Chile with Captain Pedro de Valdivia. He was present at the foundation of Santiago and in the first campaigns against the natives. Jufré accompanied Pedro de Villagra when he returned to fight in the civil war in Peru against Gonzalo Pizarro in 1547 and 1548. After his return, Jufré engaged in the Arauco War, becoming captain and justice of the Arauco Province. After the death of Valdivia in Tucapel (1553), he aided the population in the south with food; in 1554 he crushed a rebellion of the Promaucaes in Gualemo on the Lontué River (now the province of Curicó).

Jufré later fought against Lautaro and participated in the campaigns of García Hurtado de Mendoza. He held a role in the refounding of Concepción in 1559. When Francisco de Villagra became governor of Chile, Jufré was named Lieutenant Governor of the Province of Cuyo in 1561 and founded the city of San Juan de la Frontera and refounded Mendoza. Returning in 1562 because of the new Mapuche revolt, he became lieutenant of Governor of Chile and organized aid for the war in the south. He continued participating in the war for more than a decade.

In the Cabildo of Santiago (the municipal city council) Jufré held various positions, such as alcalde (magistrate) and regidor in the decades between 1550 and 1570. In addition, in 1556 he was royal alferiz of the city, between 1562 and 1563 he was its corregidor and he represented it in 1568 before the Real Audiencia established in Concepcion.

== Accomplishments ==
Jufré made a fortune developing important economic activities in Chile. He built the first shipyard next to the Maule River, in his encomienda of Pocoa. He planted the first vineyards in his encomienda of Macul near Santiago where he made wine that he sold in Peru along with other goods. Trade was conducted on his own ships. In 1553, he established a mill on the Mapocho River and later a textile factory amid his two encomiendas (Mataquito and Peteroa) on the banks of the Mataquito River. He died in Santiago in 1578 and was buried at the Church of Santo Domingo.

== Sources ==
- José Toribio Medina: Diccionario Biográfico Colonial, Imprenta Elzeviriana, Santiago, 1906.
- José Toribio Medina: Colección de documentos inéditos para la historia de Chile, Tomo XV, VALDIVIA. Y SUS COMPAÑEROS VIII, Imprenta Elzeviriana, Santiago, 1898.
  - I—Probanza de los méritos y senidos del general Juan Jufré en el descubrimiento y población de las provincias de Chile. (Archivo de Indias, Patronato, 1-5-32/16), pg. 5-216.
