= 1564 =

1564 in various calendars
- Gregorian calendar: 1564; MDLXIV
- Ab urbe condita: 2317
- Armenian calendar: 1013; ԹՎ ՌԺԳ
- Assyrian calendar: 6314
- Balinese saka calendar: 1485–1486
- Bengali calendar: 970–971
- Berber calendar: 2514
- English Regnal year: 6 Eliz. 1 – 7 Eliz. 1
- Buddhist calendar: 2108
- Burmese calendar: 926
- Byzantine calendar: 7072–7073
- Chinese calendar: 癸亥年 (Water Pig); 4261 or 4054 — to — 甲子年 (Wood Rat); 4262 or 4055
- Coptic calendar: 1280–1281
- Discordian calendar: 2730
- Ethiopian calendar: 1556–1557
- Hebrew calendar: 5324–5325
- Hindu calendars
- Vikram Samvat: 1620–1621
- Shaka Samvat: 1485–1486
- Kali Yuga: 4664–4665
- Holocene calendar: 11564
- Igbo calendar: 564–565
- Iranian calendar: 942–943
- Islamic calendar: 971–972
- Japanese calendar: Eiroku 7 (永禄７年)
- Javanese calendar: 1483–1484
- Julian calendar: 1564; MDLXIV
- Korean calendar: 3897
- Minguo calendar: 348 before ROC 民前348年
- Nanakshahi calendar: 96
- Thai solar calendar: 2106–2107
- Tibetan calendar: ཆུ་མོ་ཕག་ལོ་ (female Water-Boar); 1690 or 1309 or 537 — to — ཤིང་ཕོ་བྱི་བ་ལོ་ (male Wood-Rat); 1691 or 1310 or 538

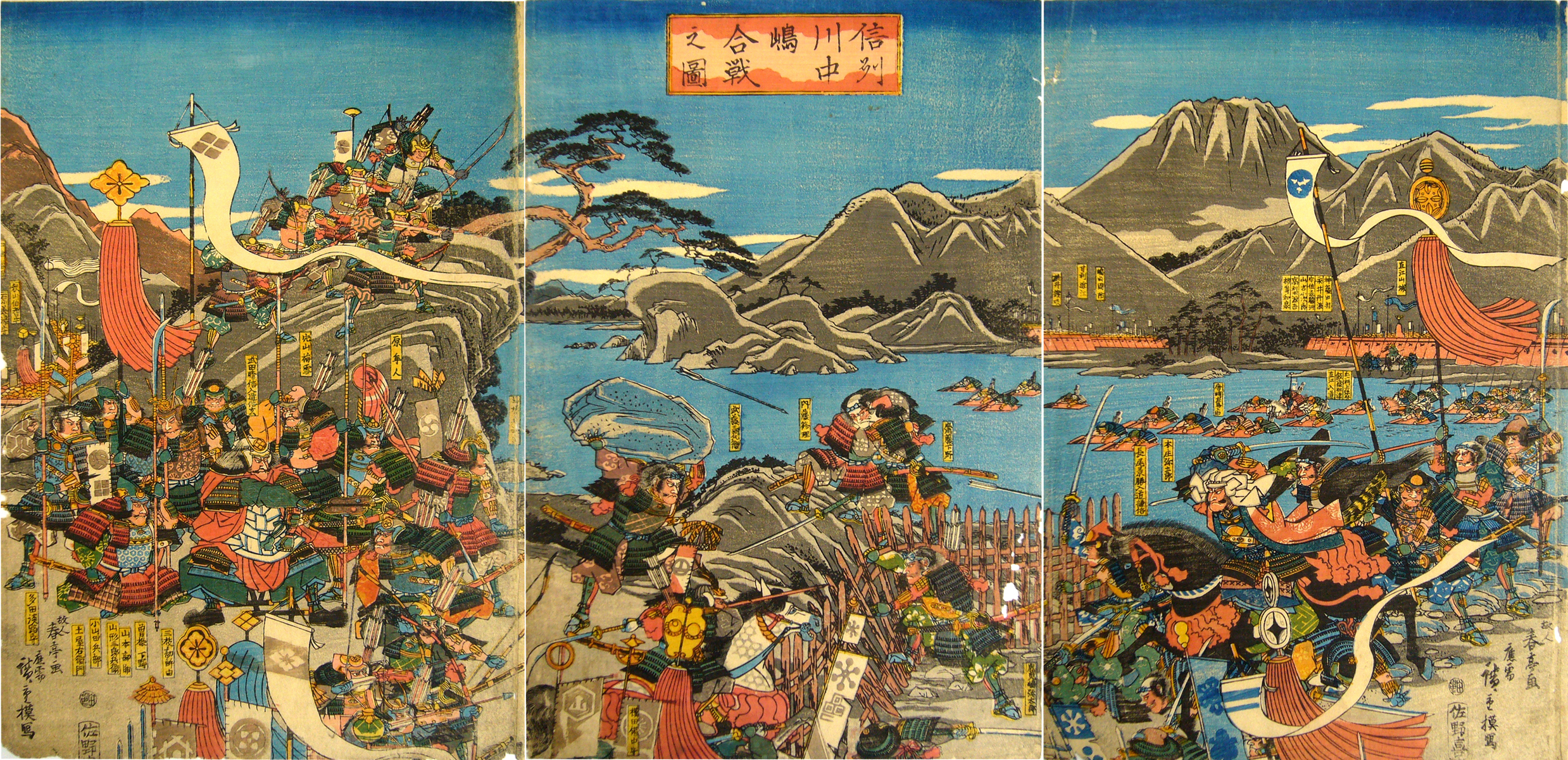
September 10: Battle of Kawanakajima

Year 1564 (MDLXIV) was a leap year starting on Saturday of the Julian calendar.

== Events ==
=== January–March ===
- January 26 – Livonian War – Battle of Ula: A Lithuanian surprise attack results in a decisive defeat of the numerically superior Russian forces.
- February 7 (11th waning of Tabodwe 925 ME) – Burmese–Siamese War: Invaders from Burma overcome the seaside defenses of the Siamese capital at Ayutthava, capturing the batteries of cannons and a set of ships sent by Portugal to help defend the kingdom.
- February 18 (8th waxing of Tabaung 925 ME) – The Burmese–Siamese War ends with the surrender of King Maha Chakkraphat of Ayutthaya (now Thailand) to King Bayinnaung of Burma). Chhakkraphat is allowed to go into exile and his son Mahinthrathirat is installed by Bayinnaung as the vassal king of Ayutthaya.
- February 19 – Francisco Coutinho III, Count of Redondo and the Viceroy of Portuguese India, dies and is succeeded by João de Mendonça Furtado
- February 20 – A group of four men assassinate the Spanish Viceroy of Peru, Diego López de Zúñiga, 4th Count of Nieva. López is succeeded temporarily by Hernando de Saavedra.
- March 15 - In India in Mughal Empire,emperor Akbar abolished Jizya tax on non-Muslims,especially Hindus.He was the first Muslim king in the world to do such thing.
- March 25 – Battle of Angol in Chile: Spanish Conquistador Lorenzo Bernal del Mercado defeats and kills the toqui Illangulién.

=== April–June ===
- April 20 – French explorer René Goulaine de Laudonnière and a group of 300 Huguenot Protestants depart from Le Havre on three ships (L'Élisabeth, Le Faucon and Le Breton) to colonize what is now the U.S. state of Florida.
- May 31 – The Swedish warship Mars, flagship of the Swedish Navy, catches fire while fighting against the navy of Denmark in the battle of Öland off of the coast of the island of the same name in the Baltic Sea, and sinks along with its crew of 350 sailors and 450 soldiers it had been transporting. The wreckage of the ship will go undiscovered for 447 years until being found on August 19, 2011.
- June 22 – French settlers abandon Charlesfort, the first French attempt at colonizing what is now the United States, and, with the help of a relief force commanded by René Goulaine, establish Fort Caroline in Florida, near what is now the city of Jacksonville.

=== July–September ===
- July 2 In India, the Mughal Emperor Akbar departs from the capital, Agra (now located in the state of Uttar Pradesh on the pretext of hunting elephants, in order to conceal his true purpose of punishing the rebel governor of Malwa, Abdullah Khan Ubzeg.
- July 24 (Full moon of Wagaung 926 ME) – In Burma (now Myanmar), Min Sekkya becomes the new King of Arakan when his half-brother, King Min Saw Hla, dies at age 31 after a long illness.
- July 25 – Maximilian II becomes the new Holy Roman Emperor upon the death of his father, Ferdinand I. Ferdinand's son Charles succeeds his father as the new Archduke of Austria.
- August 1 – Judge Francisco Ceinos becomes the new Viceroy of New Spain upon the death of Luís de Velasco.
- August 6 – In India Akbar, ruler of the Mughal Empire, defeats the rebellious governor of Malwa, Abdullah Khan Uzbeg. The defeat comes the day after the Imperial Army's arrival at Indore, now in the Indian state of Madhya Pradesh.
- August 14 – Sweden's Army fights a second naval battle at Öland against Denmark and captures three Danish Navy ships (Böse Lejonet, Morian, and David) and 600 men.
- August 28 – King Eric XIV of Sweden, who has been commanding the Swedish Army himself since the start of the Northern Seven Years' War, turns over the responsibility to Nils Boije, who captures Varberg from Denmark.
- September 4 – The Ronneby Bloodbath takes place in Ronneby, Denmark (now in Sweden).
- September 10 – Battle of Kawanakajima in Japan: Takeda Shingen fights the forces of Uesugi Kenshin for the final time, to a draw.
- September 28 – English merchant Anthony Jenkinson returns to London from his second expedition to the Grand Duchy of Moscow, having gained a considerable extension of trading rights for the English Muscovy Company.

=== October–December ===
- October 10 – Lucrezia Di Siena, the first well-known female actress in Europe, begins her career by signing a contract with the Commedia dell'arte theatre company in Rome.
- October 23 – King Bayinnaung of Burma leads 64,000 men, 3,600 horses and 330 elephants on an invasion of the Lan Na kingdom (now part of Laos.
- October 30 – The Duchy of Savoy signs the Treaty of Lausanne with the Swiss canton of Bern and relinquishes all claims to the canton of Vaud.
- November 21 – Spanish Conquistador Miguel López de Legazpi sails from Mexico. Later, he will conquer the Philippine Islands, founding Manila.
- November 25 – When four divisions of the Burmese Army arrive at Lamphun, 12.5 miles (20.1 km) from Chiang Mai, Chiang Mai's defenses flee the city. Bayinnaung spares the life of King Mekuti of Lan Na, and then spends next four months administering the annexed territory.
- December 3 – Ivan the Terrible, Tsar of all the Russias, sends his government a letter of abdication, ostensibly because of embezzlement and treason by the aristocracy and the clergy. Ivan leaves Moscow and moves to the city of Alexandrovskaya Sloboda, taking with him the relics of the palace and most of his royal court, until being persuaded to return in February on the promise that he will have absolute power.
- December 7 – King Charles IX of France agrees to the terms of a treaty with the cantons of Switzerland, agreeing for French payment of debts owed to the Swiss for loans made to Charles's father, King Henri II.

=== Date unknown ===
- The first recorded report is made of a "rat king".
- approx. date – Idris Alooma starts to rule the Kanem-Bornu Empire.
- The first Scottish Psalter is published.

== Births ==
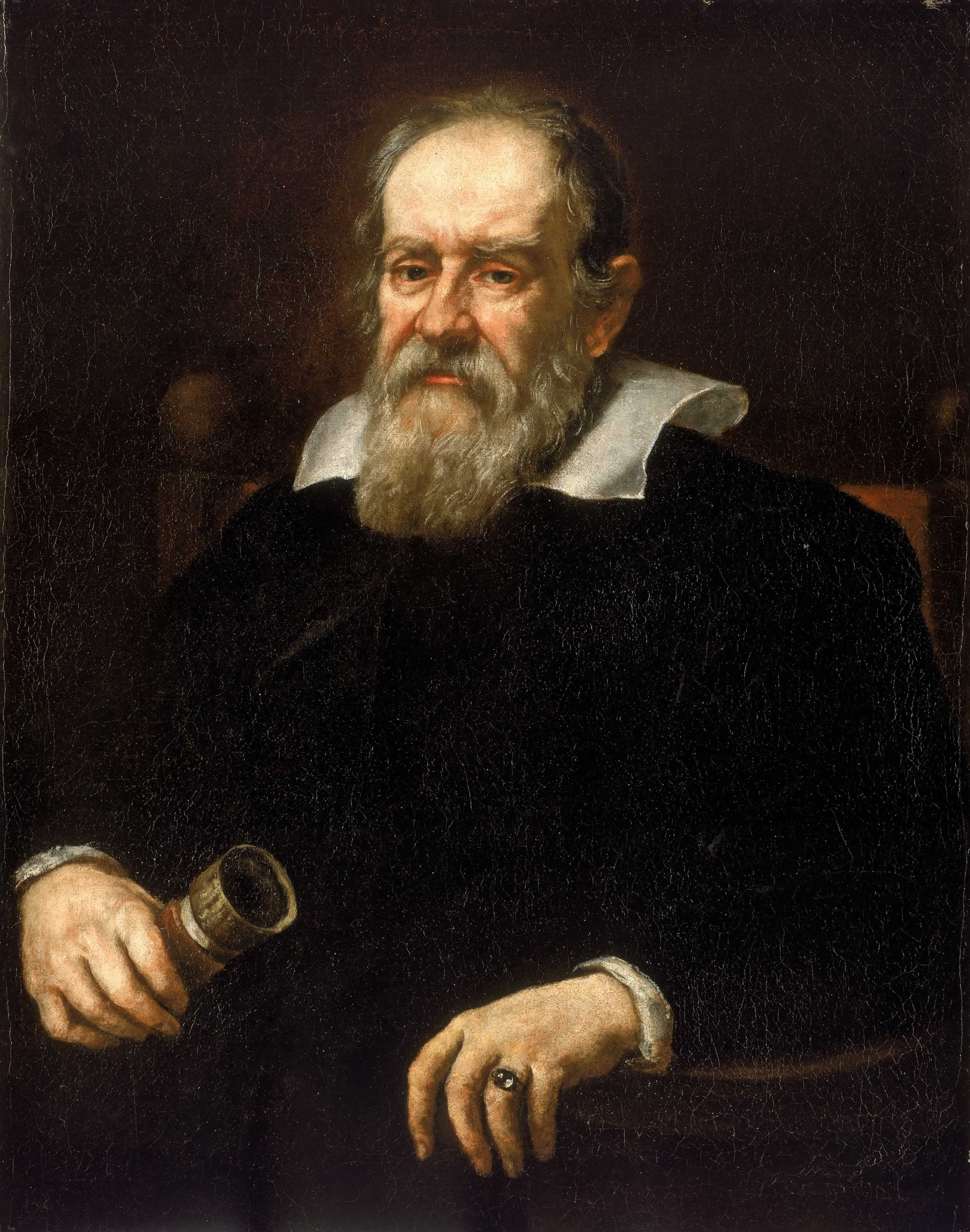
Galileo Galilei

William Shakespeare

- January 1 – Šurhaci, Chinese prince (d. 1611)
- February 15 – Galileo Galilei, Italian astronomer and physicist (d. 1642)
- February 26 (baptized) – Christopher Marlowe, English dramatist and poet (d. 1593)
- March 7 – Pierre Coton, French Jesuit and royal confessor (d. 1626)
- March 9 – David Fabricius, Frisian astronomer (d. 1617)
- March 15 – William Augustus, Duke of Brunswick-Harburg (d. 1642)
- March 20 – Thomas Morton, English bishop (d. 1659)
- April – Henry Percy, 9th Earl of Northumberland (d. 1632)
- April 2 – William Bathe, Irish Jesuit priest (d. 1614)
- April 26 (baptized) – William Shakespeare, English dramatist and poet (d. 1616)
- April 30 – Francis Hay, 9th Earl of Erroll, Scottish noble (d. 1631)
- May 27 – Margherita Gonzaga, Duchess of Ferrara, Italian noble, patron of the arts (d. 1618)
- June 11 – Joseph Heintz the Elder, Swiss artist (d. 1609)
- June 12 – John Casimir, Duke of Saxe-Coburg (d. 1633)
- June 28 – Cort Aslakssøn, Norwegian astronomer (d. 1624)
- July 6 – Johanna Sibylla of Hanau-Lichtenberg, Countess consort of Wied-Runkel and Isenburg (d. 1636)
- August 18 – Federico Borromeo, Cardinal Archbishop of Milan (d. 1631)
- August 24 – Patrick Forbes, bishop in the Church of Scotland (d. 1635)
- September 13 – Vincenzo Giustiniani, Italian banker and art collector (d. 1637)
- September 24 – William Adams, English navigator and samurai (d. 1620)
- September 25 – Magnus Brahe, Swedish noble (d. 1633)
- September 28 – Sibylla of Anhalt, Duchess consort of Württemberg (1593-1608) (d. 1614)
- October 15 – Henry Julius, Duke of Brunswick-Lüneburg (1589-1613) (d. 1613)
- October 26 – Hans Leo Hassler, German composer and organist (d. 1612)
- November 3 (baptized) – Francisco Pacheco, Spanish artist (d. 1644)
- November 22 – Henry Brooke, 11th Baron Cobham, English peer and traitor (d. 1618)
- November 24 – Joseph Gaultier de la Vallette, French astronomer (d. 1647)
- December 25
  - Johannes Buxtorf, German Calvinist theologian (d. 1629)
  - Nicolaus Mulerius, Dutch astronomer and medical academic (d. 1630)
- December 31 – Ernest II, Duke of Brunswick-Lüneburg, German ruler (d. 1611)
- approximate date – Xue Susu, Chinese artist
- date unknown
  - Pieter Brueghel the Younger, Flemish painter (d. 1638)
  - Daniel Chamier, French minister of religion (d. 1621)
  - Kryštof Harant z Polžic a Bezdružic, Bohemian composer and Protestant rebel (d. 1621)
  - Pedro Páez, Spanish Jesuit missionary to Ethiopia (d. 1622)
  - Thomas Shirley, English privateer (d. c.1634)

== Deaths ==
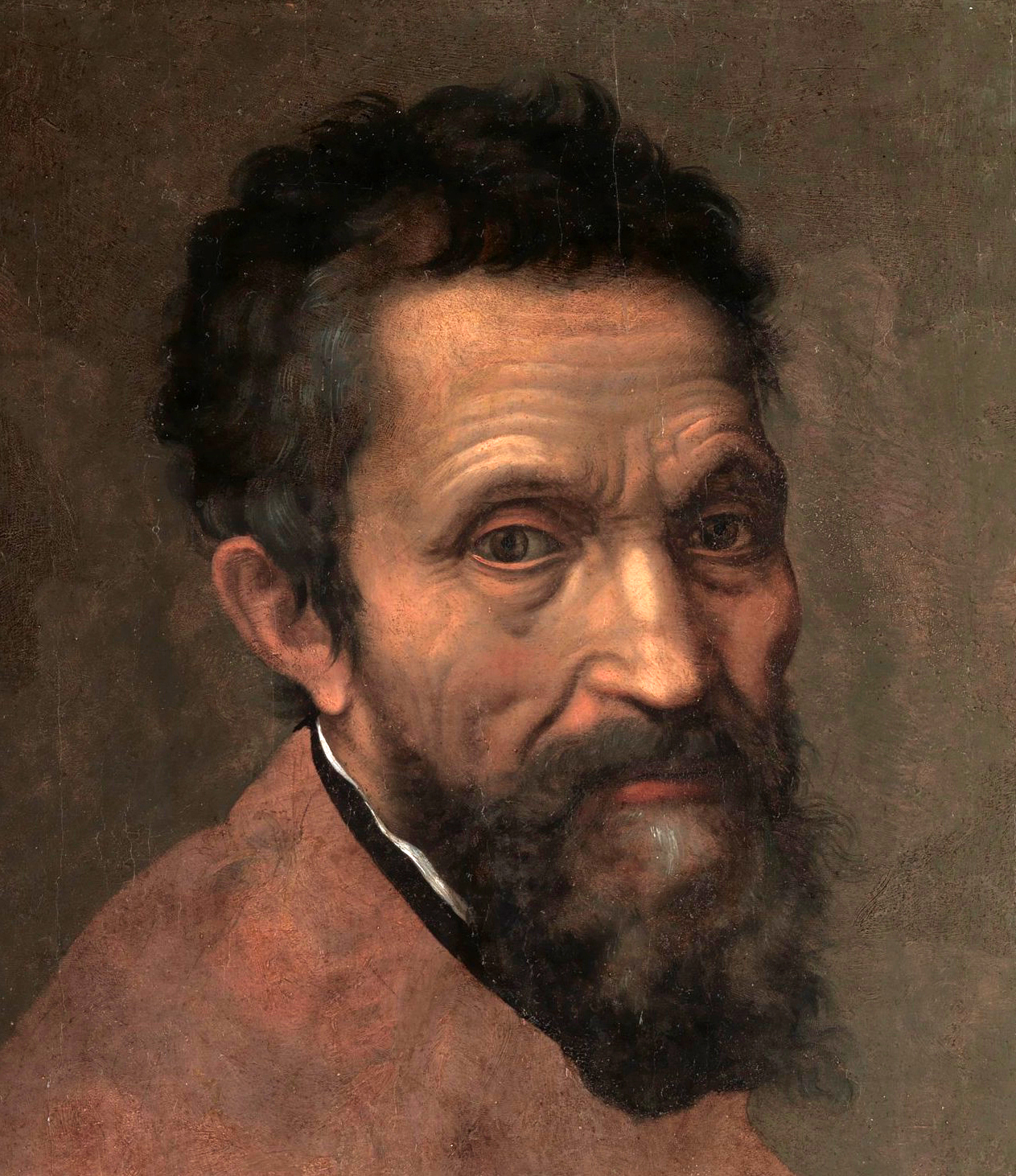
Michelangelo

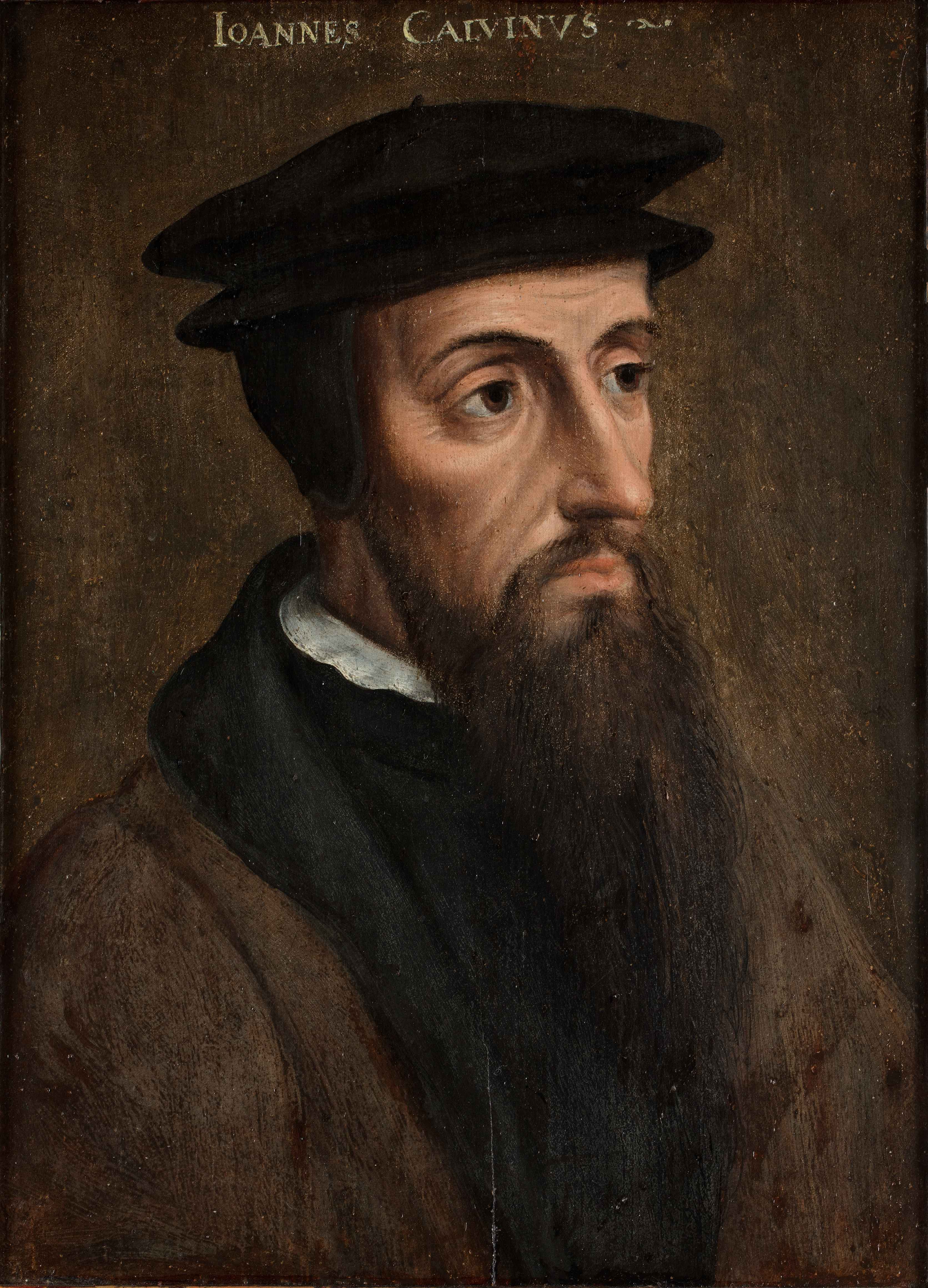
John Calvin

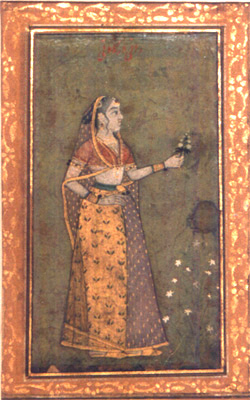
Rani Durgavati

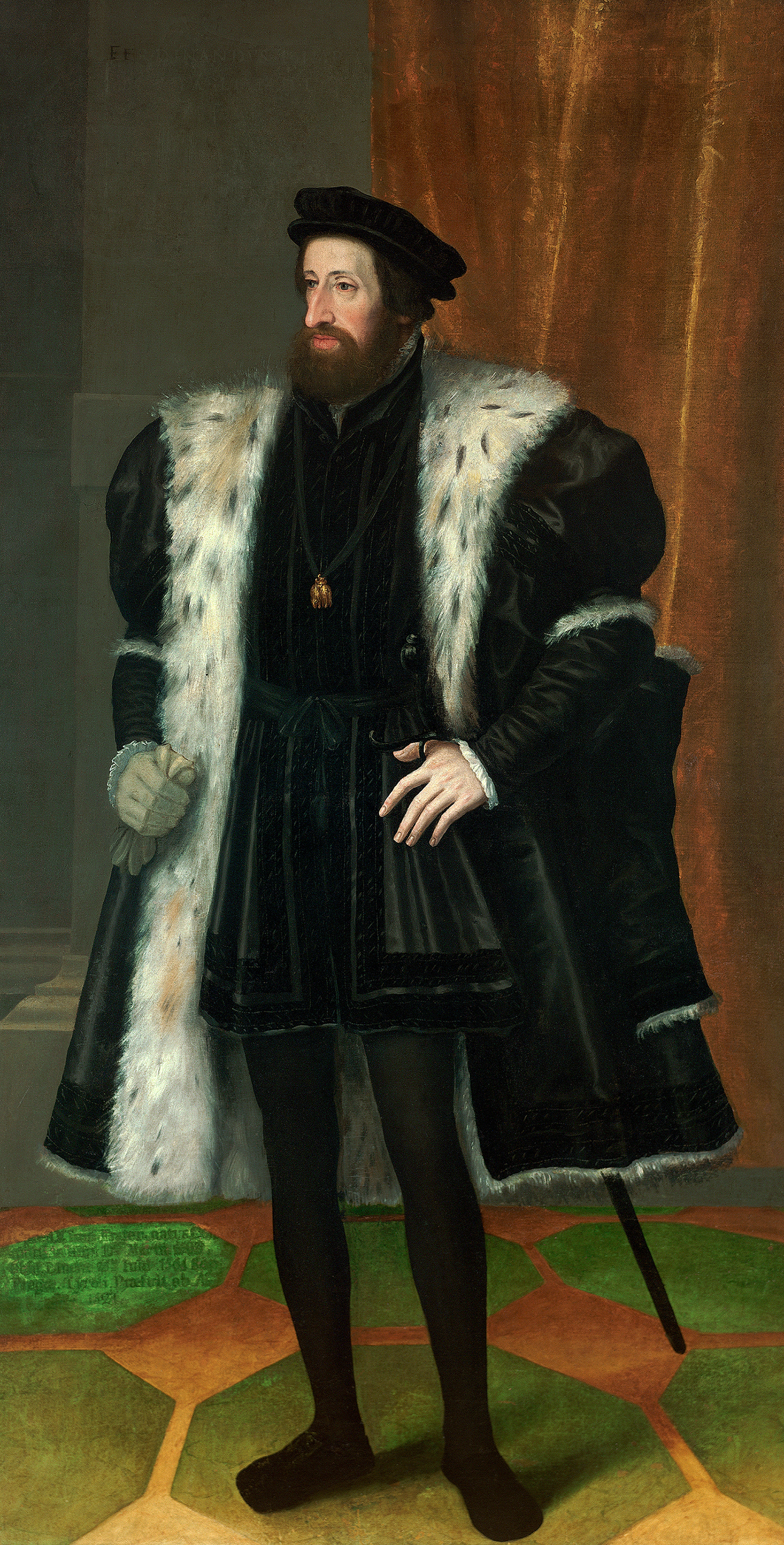
Ferdinand I, Holy Roman Emperor

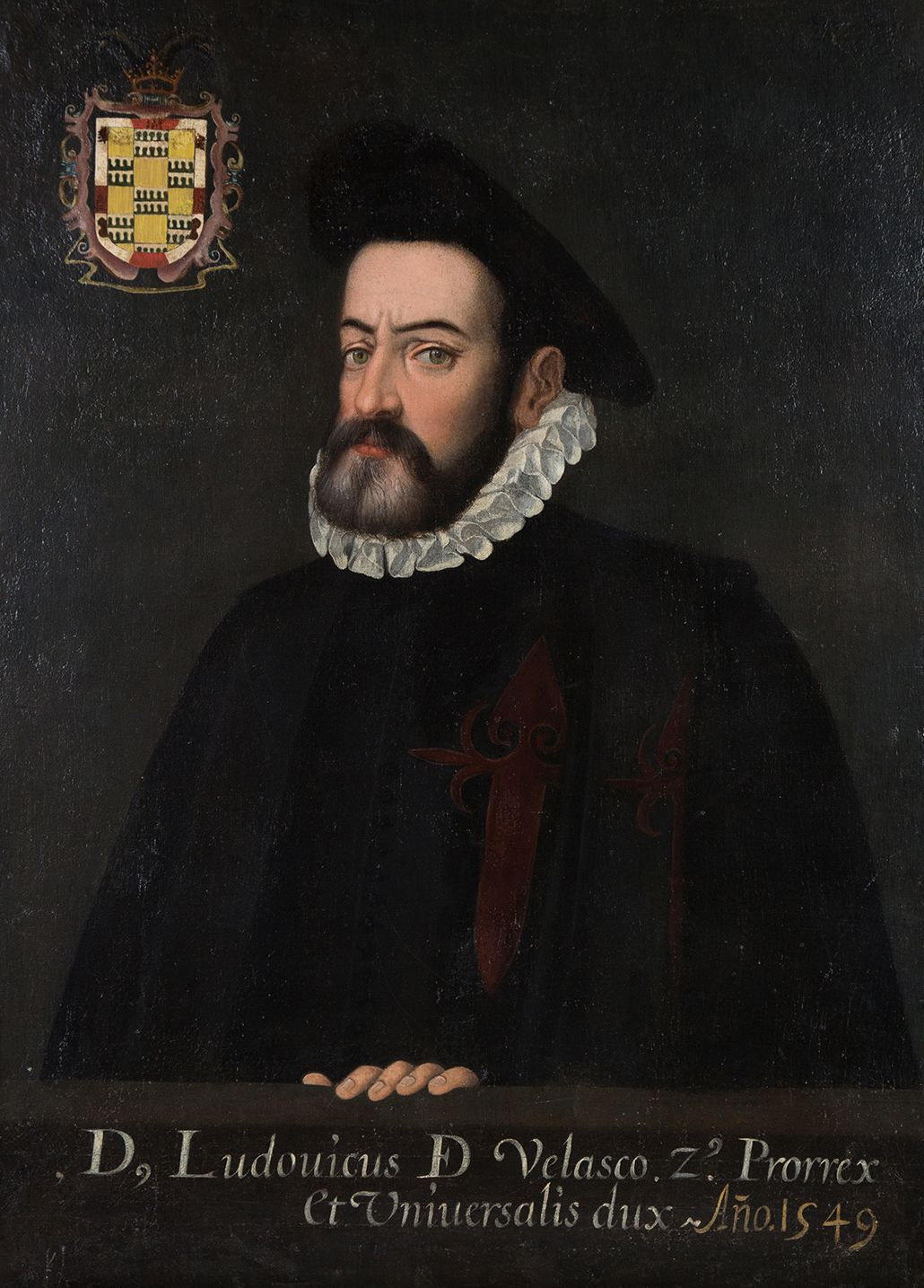
Luís de Velasco

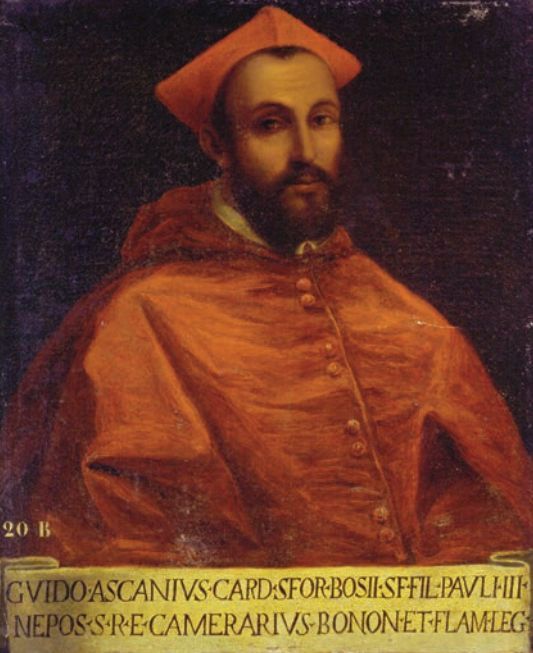
Guido Ascanio Sforza di Santa Fiora

- January 9 – Margaret Howard, Duchess of Norfolk (b. 1540)
- February 18 – Michelangelo, Italian artist, architect and sculptor (b. 1475)
- February 19 – Guillaume Morel, French classical scholar (b. 1505)
- March 5 – Isabella Losa, Spanish scholar (b. 1491)
- March 27 – Lütfi Pasha, Albanian-born Ottoman statesman, juridical scholar and poet of slave origin (b. c. 1488)
- April – Pierre Belon, French naturalist (b. 1517)
- April 9 – Georg Hartmann, German instrument maker (b. 1489)
- May 2 – Cardinal Rodolfo Pio da Carpi, Italian humanist and patron of the arts (b. 1500)
- May 27 – John Calvin, French Protestant reformer (b. 1509)
- June 24 – Rani Durgavati, Indian queen (b. 1524)
- July 23 – Eléanor de Roucy de Roye, French noble (b. 1535)
- July 25 – Ferdinand I, Holy Roman Emperor (b. 1503)
- July 31 – Luís de Velasco, Viceroy of New Spain (b. 1511)
- August 10 – Miyoshi Nagayoshi, Japanese samurai and daimyō (b. 1522)
- August 30 – Duchess Sabina of Bavaria (b. 1492)
- October 5 – Pierre de Manchicourt, Flemish composer
- October 6 – Guido Ascanio Sforza di Santa Fiora, Italian Catholic cardinal (b. 1518)
- October 15 – Andreas Vesalius, Flemish anatomist (b. 1514)
- October 18 – Johannes Acronius Frisius, German physician and mathematician (b. 1520)
- December 6 – Ambrosius Blarer, influential German reformer in southern Germany and north-eastern Switzerland (b. 1492)
- date unknown
  - Giovanni da Udine, Italian painter (b. 1487)
  - Purandara Dasa, Indian musician (b. 1484)
  - Charles Estienne, French anatomist (b. 1503)
  - Isabella de Luna, Spanish-Italian courtesan
- probable – Maurice Scève, French poet (b. 1500)
