= Guacolda =

Guacolda may refer to:

- Chilean submarine Guacolda
- Chilean torpedo boat Guacolda
- Guacolda, wife of Araucanian chief Lautaro
  - 1993 Guacolda, main-belt asteroid named after Lautaro's wife
- Guacolda Antoine Lazzerini (1908–2015), Chilean mathematician
