= Guacolda-Leftraru =

Leftraru

Design
- Manufacturer: Hewlett-Packard
- Designer: University of Chile

System
- Operating system: Linux
- Memory: 6,25 TB (RAM)
- Storage: 274 TB
- FLOPS: 70 TFlops (RPEAK)

Guacolda

Design
- Manufacturer: Dell EMC
- Designer: University of Chile

System
- Operating system: Linux
- Memory: 16,235 GB (RAM)
- FLOPS: 219 TFlops (FP64)

Leftraru Epu

Design
- Manufacturer: Lenovo
- Designer: University of Chile

System
- Operating system: Linux
- Memory: 24,576 GB (RAM)
- FLOPS: 550 TFlops (FP64)

Guacolda and Leftraru Epu are a pair of supercomputers installed at the National Laboratory for High-Performance Computing (NLHPC) at the University of Chile's Center for Mathematical Modeling. Guacolda's hardware was supplied by Dell EMC and originally utilized Intel Xeon processors—to which a node with AMD EPYC processors was later added—while Leftraru Epu uses servers supplied by Lenovo and AMD EPYC processors. In 2024, Leftraru Epu replaced the older Leftraru cluster, which had entered service in 2014 and used Hewlett-Packard servers. Together, they constitute the NLHPC's high-performance computing infrastructure, serving the computational needs of various scientific and academic organizations across the country.

They were named after Guacolda (Lautaro's wife, according to mythology) and Lautaro (the Mapuche military leader), respectively.

== History ==
Leftraru was commissioned around 2014. Guacolda was commissioned in 2019. Leftraru Epu was commissioned in mid 2024.

The Center for Mathematical Modeling at the University of Chile, together with various university institutions, submitted the National Laboratory for High-Performance Computing (NLHPC) project to CONICYT as part of the First National Competition for Shared-Use Major Scientific and Technological Equipment Service Centers. The project was awarded funding by CONICYT in November 2010 with the aim of establishing high-performance computing capabilities in Chile to support scientific research.

In 2014, the NLHPC put its Leftraru supercomputer into operation; it was composed of nodes supplied by Hewlett-Packard and had an initial theoretical performance of 50 teraflops. Subsequently, its capacity reached 70 teraflops. Guacolda came online in 2019, joining Leftraru to increase the NLHPC's processing capacity fivefold. In its initial configuration, Guacolda had a theoretical computing capacity of 196 teraflops, while the combined Guacolda-Leftraru system reached 266 teraflops and 5,236 cores. In 2024, the NLHPC replaced the old Leftraru cluster with Leftraru Epu. The new supercomputer utilizes Lenovo servers and AMD processors and was integrated into the infrastructure alongside Guacolda. In its initial configuration, it featured 7,360 compute cores, 260 teraflops of performance, 12 AMD Instinct MI210 GPUs, and 24,320 GB of RAM.

== Technical specifications ==
=== Leftraru ===
Supplier	Hewlett-Packard	
Computing nodes (132)	128 HP SL230 nodes	2 Intel Xeon E5-2660 v2 with 10 cores per CPU
Computing nodes (132)	4 HP SL250 nodes	2 Intel Xeon E5-2660 v2 with 10 cores per CPU
CPU cores	2,640	
Coprocessors	12 Intel Xeon Phi 5110p	2 TFlops theoric each one
Memory	6.25 TB of RAM	
Storage	274 TB de almacenamiento Lustre (DDN EXAScaler)	
Performance	50 TFLOPS theoric	
Connectivity	InfiniBand FDR at 56 Gbps	
Operating system	Linux	
Operational start date	Circa 2014	
End-of-service date	Circa 2024	

=== Guacolda ===
Supplier	Dell EMC	
Nodes (60)	48 Dell PowerEdge C6420 nodes	2 Intel Xeon Gold 6152 CPUs with 22 cores per CPU, and 187 GB of RAM each node
Nodes (60)	9 Dell PowerEdge R640 nodes	2 Intel Xeon Gold 6152 CPUs with 22 cores per CPU, and 765 GB de RAM each node
Nodes (60)	2 Dell PowerEdge R740 nodes	2 Intel Xeon Gold 6152 CPUs with 22 cores per CPU, 187 GB of RAM and 2 NVIDIA Tesla V100 GPU each node
Nodes (60)	1 Dell PowerEdge R7525 node	2 AMD EPYC 7713 CPUs with 64 cores per CPU, 502 GB of RAM and 2 AMD Instinct MI100 GPU
CPU cores	2,724	
Memory	16 235 GB of RAM	
Storage	4 PB of IBM Elastic Storage System (IBM ESS 3200) storage (shared across with Leftraru Epu)	
Performance	219 TFLOPS theoric (FP64)	
Connectivity	InfiniBand NDR at 400 Gbit/s	
Operating system	Linux	
Operational start date	Circa 2019	

=== Leftraru Epu ===
Supplier	Lenovo	
Computing nodes (29)	27 Lenovo ThinkSystem SR645 V3 nodes	2 CPU AMD EPYC 9754 with 128 cores each one, and 768 GB of RAM each node
Computing nodes (29)	2 Lenovo ThinkSystem SR675 V3 nodes	2 CPU AMD EPYC 9224 with 24 cores each one, 1457 GB of RAM and 6 AMD Instinct MI210 GPU each node
Debug nodes (2)	2 nodos Lenovo ThinkSystem SR645 V3 (debug)	2 CPU AMD EPYC 9224 with 24 núcleos each one and 768 GB de RAM each node
Núcleos de CPU	7104	
Memoria	24,576 GB of RAM	
Almacenamiento	4 PB of IBM Elastic Storage System (IBM ESS 3200) storage (shared across with Guacolda)	
Rendimiento	550 TFLOPS theoric (FP64)	
Conectividad	InfiniBand NDR at 400 Gbit/s	
Sistema operativo	Linux	
Fecha de entrada en operaciones	Circa 2024	

== Affiliated organizations ==
- University of Chile
- Pontifical Catholic University of Chile
- University of Santiago, Chile
- Austral University of Chile
- Catholic University of the North
- University of La Frontera
- University of La Serena
- University of Talca
- University of the Bío Bío
- Federico Santa María Technical University
- AURA observatory
- Centro Interdisciplinario de Neurociencia de Valparaíso
- Ciencia y Vida foundation
- Inria Chile
