= Juan Godínez =

Spanish conquistador (1517–1571)

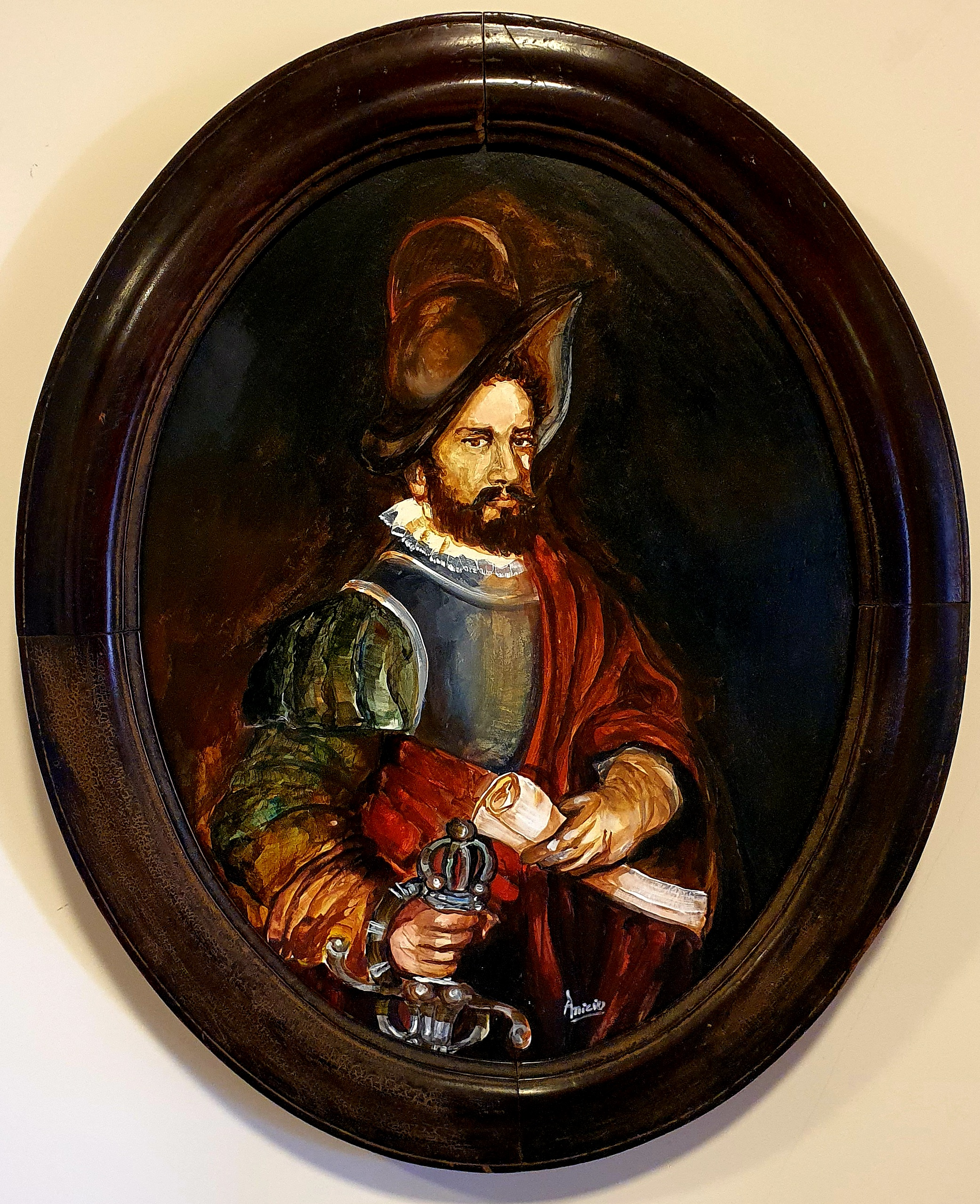
Portrait of Captain Juan Godínez, work of the visual artist Anicio Vera. It belongs to the collection of the historian Sacha Aníbal Cardona Benítez, descendant of the Conquistador

Juan Godíñez (1517 - 1571) Conquistador Juan Godínez, was born in the city of Úbeda, Spain. He came to the Americas in 1532. After coming to Peru, he campaigned with Diego de Almagro in Chile. He later served in Peru in the subjugation of Manco Inca, and in the expeditions of the captains Pedro de Candia and Diego de Rojas. Afterward, he returned to Chile in 1540 with Pedro de Valdivia serving in the wars of the Conquest of Chile until the arrival of García Hurtado de Mendoza.

He was captain of cavalry during the campaign against Lautaro in 1556 where, after the Battle of Peteroa, his company pursued the retreating Mapuche and destroyed a detachment of Lautaro's army near the Maule River. In 1557 his command defending Santiago joined that of the Governor Francisco de Villagra to destroy Lautaro's army in the Battle of Mataquito. He then served in the army of García Hurtado de Mendoza in his campaign during the Arauco War in southern Chile.

He was an encomendero of Choapa. He was a regidor of Santiago, Chile in 1550, 1554 and 1556. He married Catalina de la Cueva in 1557 and had eight children. His mestiza daughter, Leonor Godínez, married Don Juan Hurtado, notary public of Serena and Santiago. He died in 1571.

== Sources ==
- Jerónimo de Vivar, Crónica y relación copiosa y verdadera de los reinos de Chile (Chronicle and abundant and true relation of the kingdoms of Chile) ARTEHISTORIA REVISTA DIGITAL; Crónicas de América (on line in Spanish)
- de Góngora Marmolejo, Alonso,Historia de Todas las Cosas que han Acaecido en el Reino de Chile y de los que lo han gobernado (1536-1575) (History of All the Things that Have happened in the Kingdom of Chile and of those that have governed it (1536-1575)), University of Chile: Document Collections in complete texts: Cronicles (on line in Spanish)
  - XXII. De cómo vino de el audiencia de lo reyes proveído Villagra por corregidor de todo el reino, y de lo que hizo
- José Toribio Medina, Colección de documentos inéditos para la historia de Chile, Vols. 6-7, IV.— Información de senidos de Alonso López de la Eaigada, vecino de la ciudad de Santiago de Chile. (Archivo de Indias, Patronato, 1-5-34/18), Vols. 6-7 published by Impr. y Encuadernacido Barcelona; v.8-30 by Impr. Elzeviriana., 1901.
- Mariño de Lobera, Pedro, Crónica del Reino de Chile, escrita por el capitán Pedro Mariño de Lobera....reducido a nuevo método y estilo por el Padre Bartolomé de Escobar. Edición digital a partir de Crónicas del Reino de Chile Madrid, Atlas, 1960, pp. 227-562, (Biblioteca de Autores Españoles; 569-575). Biblioteca Virtual Miguel de Cervantes (on line in Spanish)
  - Capítulo LIV: Cómo el capitán Lautaro fué sobre la ciudad de Santiago con un copioso ejército y tuvo dos batallas con los capitanes Diego Cano y Pedro de Villagrán
  - Capítulo LV: De la batalla que el general Francisco de Villagrán y los capitanes Alonso de Escobar y Juan Gudines dieron a Lautaro, donde perdió la vida, en el valle de Mataquito
- Diego Barros Arana, Historia general de Chile, Tomo Primero
- José Toribio Medina, Diccionario Biográfico Colonial de Chile, Imprenta Elzeviriana, Santiago, 1906, Juan Godíñez

pg. 348.
