= Pedro de Villagra =

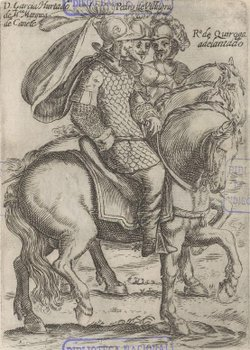
- From left to right: García Hurtado de Mendoza, Pedro de Villagra and Rodrigo de Quiroga in an illustration by Alonso de Ovalle

Royal Governor of Chile
- In office 1563–1565
- Monarch: Philip II
- Preceded by: Francisco de Villagra
- Succeeded by: Rodrigo de Quiroga

Personal details
- Born: 1513 Mombeltrán, Ávila, Spain
- Died: 11 September 1577 (aged 63–64) Lima, Peru

Military service
- Allegiance: Spain
- Years of service: 1530s–1565
- Battles/wars: Conquest of Chile: Battle of Peteroa; Siege of Concepción

Pedro de Villagra y Martínez (1513 in Mombeltrán, Ávila Province – September 11, 1577 in Lima) was a Spanish soldier who participated in the conquest of Chile, being appointed its Royal Governor between 1563 and 1565.

His father was Juan de Villagra, a minor civil official. In 1537 he moved from Spain to Cartagena de Indias, then to Santa Marta and later Peru. He arrived in Chile with the expedition of Pedro de Valdivia.

With the founding of Santiago, Villagra held for 4 years the post of the city's mayor. Valdivia also granted him an encomienda in Tirúa. After the death of the governor, he moved back to Peru, where he married Beatriz de Figueroa.

He returned to Chile when his nephew (cousin?) Francisco de Villagra was governor for the first time. He fought in the Arauco War and took command of the southern forces when the governor became ill. In 1556 he commanded the forces that drove Lautaro back from Santiago in the Battle of Peteroa.

He again commanded forces under Francisco de Villagra when he became governor again in 1561. When Francisco de Villagra died on June 22, 1563, he left Pedro de Villagra as interim governor. This was later confirmed by the Viceroy of Peru, Diego López de Zúñiga y Velasco. His military strategy led him to concentrate his forces, vacating the fort Arauco in order to reinforce Angol and Concepción. Some of the worst Mapuche defeats would be suffered through the attack on Angol, where the garrisoning forces led by Lorenzo Bernal del Mercado inflicted over a thousand of casualties and killed the toqui Illangulién in the Battle of Angol. Later he headed a new campaign in the south, relieving the Siege of Concepcion and resulting in the victorious battles of Reinohuelen and Tolmillán against the Mapuches north of the Bio-Bio River. This series of defeats resulted in a few years of apparent peace between the Spanish and Mapuche.

With the death of the viceroy López de Zúñiga y Velasco in 1564 the political situation deteriorated for Villagra. In 1565, at the orders of the new viceroy Lope García de Castro, he was replaced by Rodrigo de Quiroga, arrested, and sent to Peru, where he managed to clear his name. After his absolution he petitioned the king for the reparations he believed himself due, but he never received a response.

He died in Lima on September 11, 1577.

Government offices
Preceded by Francisco de Villagra	Royal Governor of Chile; 1563–1565	Succeeded by Rodrigo de Quiroga
