= Battle of Mataquito =

1557 battle during the Arauco War

Coordinates: 35°04′05″S 71°38′19″W

- Part of the Arauco War
Date	April 30, 1557
Location	Vicinity near the foot of the Cerro Chiripilco northeast of the modern town of La Huerta, Chile, in Hualañé on the north bank of the Mataquito River
Result	Spanish victory

Belligerents
Spanish Empire	Mapuches

Commanders and leaders
Francisco de Villagra	Lautaro †

Strength
120 Spanish soldiers and a number of indios amigos	700 Mapuche and 500 allied warriors, from the provinces of "Itata, Nuble and Renoguelen"

Casualties and losses
1 Spaniard, over half of the indios amigos	250 – 500 Mapuche

The Battle of Mataquito was fought in the Arauco War on April 30, 1557, between the forces of the Spanish governor, Francisco de Villagra, and Mapuche headed by their toqui Lautaro. It was a surprise attack, carried out at dawn, on Lautaro's fortified camp between a wooded mountain and the shore of the Mataquito River. The battle is notable for ending Mapuche designs on Santiago, while also avenging the death of former governor Pedro de Valdivia, who had been killed by Lautaro's warriors four years earlier.

== Overview ==
In early 1557, following the defeat and retreat of Lautaro after the Battle of Peteroa, Francisco de Villagra felt strong enough to gather a strong force of soldiers and march south to aid the remaining cities against the Mapuche besetting them. Discovering that the city of Santiago was now relatively unprotected, Lautaro evaded the army of Villagra, letting them pass to the south. He soon marched again on Santiago, gathering a new army of 6,000 men joined by allies under Panigualgo, raising its strength to 10,000 men. However once the army reached the banks of the Mataquito River, Lautaro's treatment of the local Indians in a manner similar to that of the Spaniards had created many enemies, and after a quarrel with his ally over this mistreatment, most of the allies and many of the Mapuche refused to follow him. He moved over a league up river from Lora and established himself in a fortified camp in a place called Mataquito.

De Villagra became aware that the location of the camp had been betrayed by local Indians previously abused by Lautaro. De Villagra sent word to Juan Godíñez near Santiago to meet him as he hurriedly returned from the south with seventy men. The Spanish forces met at a location in the province of Gualemo three leagues from Lautaro's camp, without Lautaro being warned by the local Indians. The unified force of Francisco de Villagra and Juan Godíñez came to 120 men, with 57 horsemen (including Pedro Mariño de Lobera), five arcabuzeros, and more than four hundred yanakuna, made a surprise night march over the hills of Caune, to the one overlooking Lautaro's camp, on the shore of the Mataquito River. De Villagra sent a body of Spanish infantry (including Alonso López de la Eaigada) with arquebus or swords and shields into the carrizal under Gabriel de Villagra.

At dawn de Villagra made his surprise attack on the camp. The infantry burst into the fortress while Juan Godíñez and de Villagra led the charge of the cavalry down the hill against the fortress with their Indian allies in advance. In the beginning of the battle they killed Lautaro, coming out of the doorway of his ruca. When the Spaniards shouted Lautaro was dead, the allied warriors from Itata, Ñuble, and Renoguelen fled any way they could, leaving only Lautaro's Mapuche fighting a six-hour battle, putting up a stubborn resistance despite the death of their leader. At the end of the battle Lautaro and from 250 to 500 Mapuche were killed, while the Spaniards lost Juan de Villagra and over half of their yanacona killed or wounded along with many of the Spaniards' horses. Lautaro's head was then taken and displayed in the main plaza of Santiago.

== Sources ==
Of these sources Pedro Mariño de Lobera and Alonso López de la Eaigada participated in the battle. While Jerónimo de Vivar and Alonso de Góngora Marmolejo were both living in Chile at the time, Vivar was in Santiago compiling his history, Marmolejo was in the south. Diego de Rosales wrote about one hundred years after the battle, Vicente Carvallo y Goyeneche over two hundred years later.

- Jerónimo de Vivar, Crónica y relación copiosa y verdadera de los reinos de Chile (Chronicle and abundant and true story of the kingdoms of Chile) ARTEHISTORIA REVISTA DIGITAL; Crónicas de América (on line in Spanish)
  - Capítulo CXXIX Que trata de cómo sabido por el general Francisco de Villagran la llegada de Lautaro a los términos de esta ciudad y de lo que en ella hizo
- de Góngora Marmolejo, Alonso, Historia de Todas las Cosas que han Acaecido en el Reino de Chile y de los que lo han gobernado (1536–1575) (History of All the Things that Have happened in the Kingdom of Chile and of those who have governed it (1536–1575)), University of Chile: Document Collections in complete texts: Cronicles (on line in Spanish)
  - XXII. De cómo vino de el audiencia de lo reyes proveído Villagra por corregidor de todo el reino, y de lo que hizo
- José Toribio Medina, Colección de documentos inéditos para la historia de Chile, Tomos VI-VII, IV.— Información de senidos de Alonso López de la Eaigada, vecino de la ciudad de Santiago de Chile. (Archivo de Indias, Patronato, 1-5-34/18), Vols. 6–7 published by Impr. y Encuadernacido Barcelona; v.8–30 by Impr. Elzeviriana., 1901.
- José Toribio Medina: Colección de documentos inéditos para la historia de Chile, Tomo XV, VALDIVIA. Y SUS COMPAÑEROS VIII, Imprenta Elzeviriana, Santiago, 1898.
  - I—Probanza de los méritos y senidos del general Juan Jufré en el descubrimiento y población de las provincias de Chile. (Archivo de Indias, Patronato, 1-5-32/16), pg. 5-216.
- Mariño de Lobera, Pedro, Crónica del Reino de Chile, escrita por el capitán Pedro Mariño de Lobera....reducido a nuevo método y estilo por el Padre Bartolomé de Escobar. Edición digital a partir de Crónicas del Reino de Chile Madrid, Atlas, 1960, pp. 227–562, (Biblioteca de Autores Españoles; 569–575). Biblioteca Virtual Miguel de Cervantes (on line in Spanish)
  - Capítulo LV: De la batalla que el general Francisco de Villagrán y los capitanes Alonso de Escobar y Juan Gudines dieron a Lautaro, donde perdió la vida, en el valle de Mataquito
- Diego de Rosales, "Historia General del Reino de Chile", Flandes Indiano, 3 tomos. Valparaíso 1877 – 1878.
  - Historia general de el Reyno de Chile: Flandes Indiano Vol. 2 CAPÍTULO X.
- Carvallo y Goyeneche, Vicente, Descripcion Histórico Geografía del Reino de Chile, Tomo I, (Description Historical Geography of the Kingdom of Chile, Volume I), Coleccion de historiadores de Chile y documentos relativos a la historia nacional, Tomo VIII, IMPRENTA DE LA LIBRERÍA DEL MERCURIO de A. y M. Echeverria, Morando Núm. 38., Santiago, 1878.
  - Tomo I, Capítulo XXXIII. Se resuelve Lautaro a rendir la ciudad de Santiago – Caupolican repite el asedio de La Imperial y Valdivia – Villagra va a su socorrro – Muere Lautaro en su espedicion.
