= Chilean ship Lautaro =

Several ships of the Chilean Navy have been named Lautaro after Lautaro, a Mapuche leader during the War of Arauco.

- Lautaro (1818–1828), of the First Chilean Navy Squadron, formerly the British East Indiaman Windham.
- Lautaro (1865–1866), a steamer.
- Lautaro (1898–1954), a sailing frigate.
- Lautaro (1880–1910), a tug, later renamed Milcavi.
- Lautaro (1910–?), a tug.
- Lautaro (1941–1945), formerly the German barque Priwall, built 1917.
- Lautaro (1947–1991), a patrol boat, formerly the Sotoyomo-class Fleet Tug USS ATA-122.

A ship of the Compañía Sudamericana de Vapores:

- Rímac (1872–1902), a steamship, renamed Lautaro and sunk off Panama City during the War of the Thousand Days.
