= Chilean frigate Lautaro =

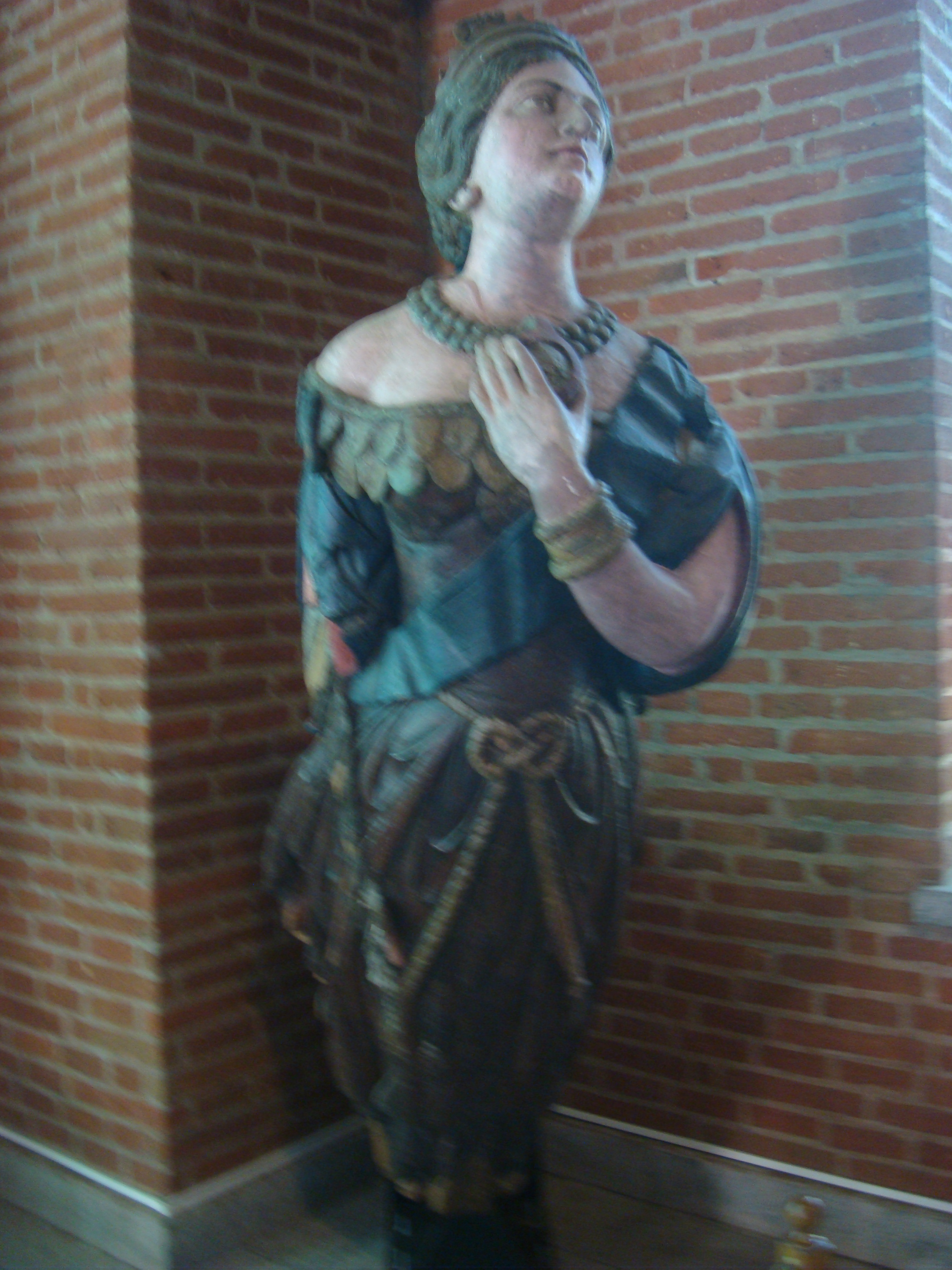
- Figurehead of the frigate Lautaro (ex Majestic)

History

United Kingdom
- Name: Majestic
- Operator: Brocklebank Line
- Builder: Harland & Wolff
- Yard number: 89
- Launched: 1875
- Completed: 24 June 1875
- Fate: Sold to Chile, 1898

Chile
- Name: Majestic (1898–1904); Lautaro (1904–1954)
- Namesake: Lautaro
- Operator: Chilean Navy
- Commissioned: 1898
- Refit: 1903
- Fate: Sold, 1954

General characteristics
- Class & type: Sailing frigate
- Displacement: 1,884 tons
- Length: 273 ft 4 in (83.31 m)
- Beam: 40 ft 2 in (12.24 m)
- Depth: 24 ft 2 in (7.37 m)
- Sail plan: Full-rigged ship

Lautaro was a sailing frigate of the Chilean Navy, originally purchased for use as a hulk, but later put into service as a training ship.

== Ship history ==
The Majestic, County of Peebles and British Commodore were three dismasted ship hulls bought by the Chilean Navy in 1898 in order to be beached and used as coaling stations for Chilean warships in the sparsely populated region of the Strait of Magellan as the Argentine–Chilean naval arms race put both countries at the brink of war.

After the purchase from the Brocklebank Line, the Majestic was loaded with coal in England and towed to Punta Arenas. As the hull was considered seaworthy by the navy, the government decided to refit the ship to be used as training ship for seamen cadets. She was repaired in Talcahuano, and in 1904 was renamed Lautaro.

Two years later, the cruiser Errázuriz (1890) became a school ship for seamen cadets replacing the Lautaro and the Lautaro sailed bound for Australia, Peru and Mexico in commercial use. In September 1919 she sailed for Japan loaded with 2,750 tons of saltpetre, finally returning to Chile in January 1921 with a cargo of weapons and explosives for the Chilean Army.

She was stationed off the Quiriquina Island and used as drill ship for seaman cadets until 1950.

The ship was finally sold on 5 June 1954.
