= Battle of Peteroa =

1556 battle

- Part of Arauco War
| Date | June – July, 1556 |
| Location | Peteroa |
| Result | Spanish victory |

Belligerents
| Spanish Empire | Mapuches |

Commanders and leaders
| Pedro de Villagra | Lautaro |

Strength
| 40 Spanish soldiers, 400 yanakuna | 300 soldiers |

Casualties and losses
| Two Spaniards were killed | 200 killed |

Battle of Peteroa was a battle in the Arauco War in 1556, in a plain beside a river in the Mataquito River valley, called Peteroa. The battle was between the Spanish forces of Pedro de Villagra, and Mapuche headed by their toqui Lautaro.

== History ==
Following the destruction of Concepcion and Angol in 1554, the Mapuche suffered from the effects of a famine and an epidemic for two years. Meanwhile, in the north the victories of Lautauro led to uprisings by the previously subdued Promaucaes of Gualemo and the Picunche in the Aconcagua Valley, but these were put down. In 1556, the Promauces sent a message to the Mapuche of Arauco promising food to support their army and warriors to join it in a war against the Spanish in Santiago.

In May 1556 Lautaro was able to lead a force north of the Bio Bio River expecting to instigate a rebellion there among subjugated Mapuche north of that river and the Promaucaes north of the Itata River. Lautaro began recruiting warriors among these people, conquered by Pedro de Valdivia years before, who were now inspired to revolt by the previous successes of Lautaro.

Lautaro led his force of Mapuche to the north towards Santiago. After crossing the Maule River he encamped near modern Teno, at a place called Peteroa. But when he entered the places subject to Santiago, he began taking reprisals against the Promaucaes who refused to join him, doing great damage and depopulating the land. Spanish and Indian refugees fled to the city for aid and protection. After he was victorious over the first probe from Santiago of twenty Spanish horsemen under Diego Cano, Lautaro built an earthen fort around his camp flooding the land around it to hamper the Spaniards from attacking it.

Later a larger force under Pedro de Villagra sent from Santiago clashed with Lautaro's army in and around their fortress in Peteroa over a few days, killing 500 of their number for the loss of two Spaniards but were not able to take the position. However the losses in the battle and the approach of Spanish reinforcements persuaded Lautaro to retire towards the Maule River with the intention of establishing himself there. However a Spanish cavalry detachment under Juan Godíñez, caught and nearly destroyed a detachment of his army there, persuading Lautaro to move further south beyond the Itata River to recover his strength.

== Additional information ==
=== Sources ===
- Jerónimo de Vivar, Crónica y relación copiosa y verdadera de los reinos de Chile (Chronicle and abundant and true relation of the kingdoms of Chile) ARTEHISTORIA REVISTA DIGITAL; Crónicas de América (on line in Spanish)
  - Capítulo CXXVII Que trata de cómo se revelaron los indios de la provincia de los pormocaes y de cómo fue un capitán a ellos y de lo que hizo
  - Capítulo CXXVIII Que trata de cómo visto el mandado de los oidores los alcaldes de las ciudades tomaron la mano a ir a poblar la ciudad de la Concepción y del suceso
  - Capítulo CXXIX Que trata de cómo sabido por el general Francisco de Villagran la llegada de Lautaro a los términos de esta ciudad y de lo que en ella hizo
- de Góngora Marmolejo, Alonso, Historia de Todas las Cosas que han Acaecido en el Reino de Chile y de los que lo han gobernado (1536-1575) (History of All the Things that Have happened in the Kingdom of Chile and of those that have governed it (1536-1575)), University of Chile: Document Collections in complete texts: Chronicles (on line in Spanish)
  - XXII. De cómo vino de el audiencia de lo reyes proveído Villagra por corregidor de todo el reino, y de lo que hizo
- José Toribio Medina, Colección de documentos inéditos para la historia de Chile, Tomo XXVI, IV.— Información de senidos de Alonso López de la Eaigada, vecino de la ciudad de Santiago de Chile. (Archivo de Indias, Patronato, 1-5-34/18), Vols. 6-7 published by Impr. y Encuadernacido Barcelona; v.8-30 by Impr. Elzeviriana., 1901.
- Mariño de Lobera, Pedro, Crónica del Reino de Chile, escrita por el capitán Pedro Mariño de Lobera....reducido a nuevo método y estilo por el Padre Bartolomé de Escobar. Edición digital a partir de Crónicas del Reino de Chile Madrid, Atlas, 1960, pp. 227-562, (Biblioteca de Autores Españoles; 569-575). Biblioteca Virtual Miguel de Cervantes (on line in Spanish)
  - Capítulo LIV: Cómo el capitán Lautaro fué sobre la ciudad de Santiago con un copioso ejército y tuvo dos batallas con los capitanes Diego Cano y Pedro de Villagrán
  - Capítulo LV: De la batalla que el general Francisco de Villagrán y los capitanes Alonso de Escobar y Juan Gudines dieron a Lautaro, donde perdió la vida, en el valle de Mataquito
- Carvallo y Goyeneche, Vicente, Descripcion Histórico Geografía del Reino de Chile (Description Historical Geography of the Kingdom of Chile), University of Chile: Document Collections in complete texts: Chronicles (on line in Spanish)
  - Tomo I, Capítulo XXXIII. Se resuelve Lautaro a rendir la ciudad de Santiago - Caupolican repite el asedio de La Imperial y Valdivia - Villagra va a su socorro - Muere Lautaro en su espedicion.
