= Lorenzo Bernal del Mercado =

Spanish military officer (c.1530–1593)

Lorenzo Bernal del Mercado (c. 1530–1593) was a Spanish captain who was one of the more successful soldiers in the Arauco War in Chile rising to the rank of Maestre de Campo and temporary Capitán General of the Captaincy General of Chile.

Lorenzo Bernal del Mercado was born in Cantalapiedra, Salamanca in about 1530. He was the son of Francisco Martinez Nieto and Ana Bernal del Mercado. He traveled to the Americas in 1541 with the expedition of Blasco Nuñez de Vela, recently named Viceroy of Peru. From Peru, he went to Bolivia where he had some success. In 1549, he joined with Pedro de Valdivia coming to Chile from the valley of Potosí, Valdivia gave him an encomienda in the area of the present Valdivia, naming him temporary captain of the new city. The death of Valdivia at the hands of Lautaro made so deep an impression on him that he left his encomienda and served under Francisco de Villagra in the war. Bernal del Mercado showed intelligence, bravery and an energetic character. He also had a deep and lasting hatred towards the Mapuche.

The defense of the fort of Los Infantes was in his charge and he served under governor Garcia Hurtado de Mendoza and Pedro de Villagra and the government of the Real Audiencia. In 1564, he defeated and killed the toqui Illangulién in the Battle of Angol. He gained a good reputation from his successes in the War of Arauco, and for that reason was appointed Maestro de Campo and in addition corregidor of Concepción in 1565 and of Santiago in 1583. In 1570, he was named to carry out the war as temporary Capitán General after the governor Melchor Bravo de Saravia resigned the post and appointed him in his place. The experience and prestige that he accumulated was immense and had all the merit to be named as Royal Governor of Chile, but his hard and undiplomatic character worked against him. He remained as Maestro de Campo until 1583, and was soon after named Captain of the line of defense. Sometimes he acted as an advisor to the king providing to him with detailed information on the state of the war. He died in Angol in 1593, without becoming governor.

== Sources ==
- Alonso de Góngora Marmolejo, Historia de Todas las Cosas que han Acaecido en el Reino de Chile y de los que lo han gobernado (1536-1575) (History of All the Things that Have happened in the Kingdom of Chile and of those that have governed it (1536-1575)), Edición digital a partir de Crónicas del Reino de Chile, Madrid, Atlas, 1960, pp. 75–224, (on line in Spanish)
- Pedro Mariño de Lobera, Crónica del Reino de Chile, escrita por el capitán Pedro Mariño de Lobera....reducido a nuevo método y estilo por el Padre Bartolomé de Escobar. Edición digital a partir de Crónicas del Reino de Chile Madrid, Atlas, 1960, pp. 227-562, (Biblioteca de Autores Españoles; 569-575). Biblioteca Virtual Miguel de Cervantes (on line in Spanish)
- Icarito > Enciclopedia Virtual > Biografías, Lorenzo Bernal del Mercado
