= Guacolda (Mapuche) =

Chilean wife of indigenous warrior (d. 1557)

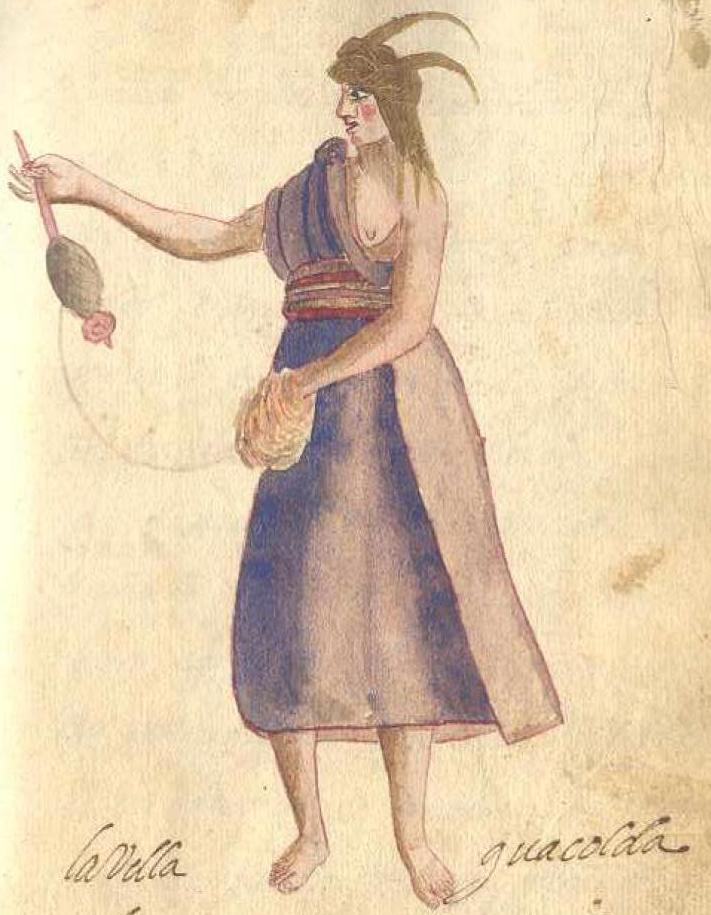
- Guacolda in as portrayed by Fray Diego de Ocaña in a travel log, 1605.
- Born: possibly Concepción, Captaincy General of Chile, Spanish Empire (now Concepción, Chile)
- Died: 1557; Chilipirco, Araucanía (now Peteroa, Chile)
- Spouse: Lautaro

Guacolda (from Mapudungun, Wa-kelü, meaning "corn-colored", in reference to her possibly blonde hair, died 1557), baptized as Teresa, was the wife of Mapuche lonko Lautaro. Her existence, similarly to Caupolicán's alleged wife, Fresia, is a matter of debate, as some consider her to be a mythological legend and others consider her to be a real historical figure.

She was allegedly raised in the household of Pedro de Villagra, where she was given the Christian name of Teresa. When Lautaro's army conquered the city of Concepción, she deeply fell in love with him and decided to run away, accompanying him on all of the future battles which he led against the Spaniards.

Both Alonso de Ercilla and Pedro Mariño de Lobera described her in their travel logs as a "very beautiful woman". According to both, Guacolda warned Lautaro of incoming Spanish troops from Peteroa (known as Chilipirco to the natives), who eventually found and killed Lautaro. After this, Francisco de Villagra took Guacolda with him, after which she apparently "died of sadness".
