= Illangulién =

Mapuche leader (died 1564)

Illangulién, Quiromanite, Queupulien or Antiguenu, was the Mapuche toqui (war leader) elected to replace Lemucaguin or Caupolicán the younger in 1559 following the Battle of Quiapo to his death in battle in the Battle of Angol in 1564.

After the campaign of García Hurtado de Mendoza that culminated in the Battle of Quiapo, many of the Mapuche warriors were dead or wounded and the population had been decimated by the effects of war, starvation and epidemic disease. Elected to by the remaining leaders shortly after the battle of Quiapo, Illangulién decided to let the nation offer apparent submission to the Spanish while he and a few warriors secretly retreated into the marshes of Lumaco. There they constructed a base where they would gather their strength and train a new generation of warriors for a future revolt.

The murder of the hated encomendero Pedro de Avendaño in July 1561 triggered a new general rising of the Mapuche greater than the previous ones. Illangulién after several years of hiding his activities in the swamps began to lead his forces out on raids on Spanish territory to season his newly trained warriors and live off the lands of their enemy. His forces clashed with those of the Spanish Governor Francisco de Villagra and defeated them several times in the next few years. After the death of Francisco de Villagra they fought the forces of his successor Pedro de Villagra around the city of San Andrés de Los Infantes. During the Battle of Angol in a series of moves and counter moves between Illangulién and the garrison commander Lorenzo Bernal del Mercado, the Toqui was able to blockade the town from impregnable fortresses as he moved his blockade closer and closer to the town. At last the garrison commander was able to catch a detachment of his opponents army in an awkward position along the bank of a nearby river and by driving them over a steep slope into the river killed over a thousand of them including the toqui Illangulien in 1564.

== Sources ==
- Juan Ignacio Molina, The Geographical, Natural, and Civil History of Chili, Volume II, Longman, Hurst, Rees, and Orme, Paternoster-Row, London, 1809
- Alonso de Góngora Marmolejo, Historia de Todas las Cosas que han Acaecido en el Reino de Chile y de los que lo han gobernado (1536-1575) (History of All the Things that Have happened in the Kingdom of Chile and of those that have governed it (1536-1575)), Edición digital a partir de Crónicas del Reino de Chile, Madrid, Atlas, 1960, pp. 75–224, (on line in Spanish)
- Diego de Rosales, “Historia General del Reino de Chile”, Flandes Indiano, 3 tomos. Valparaíso 1877 - 1878.
  - Historia general de el Reino de Chile: Flandes Indiano, Tomo II (1554-1625)
