= Mombeltrán =

- municipality
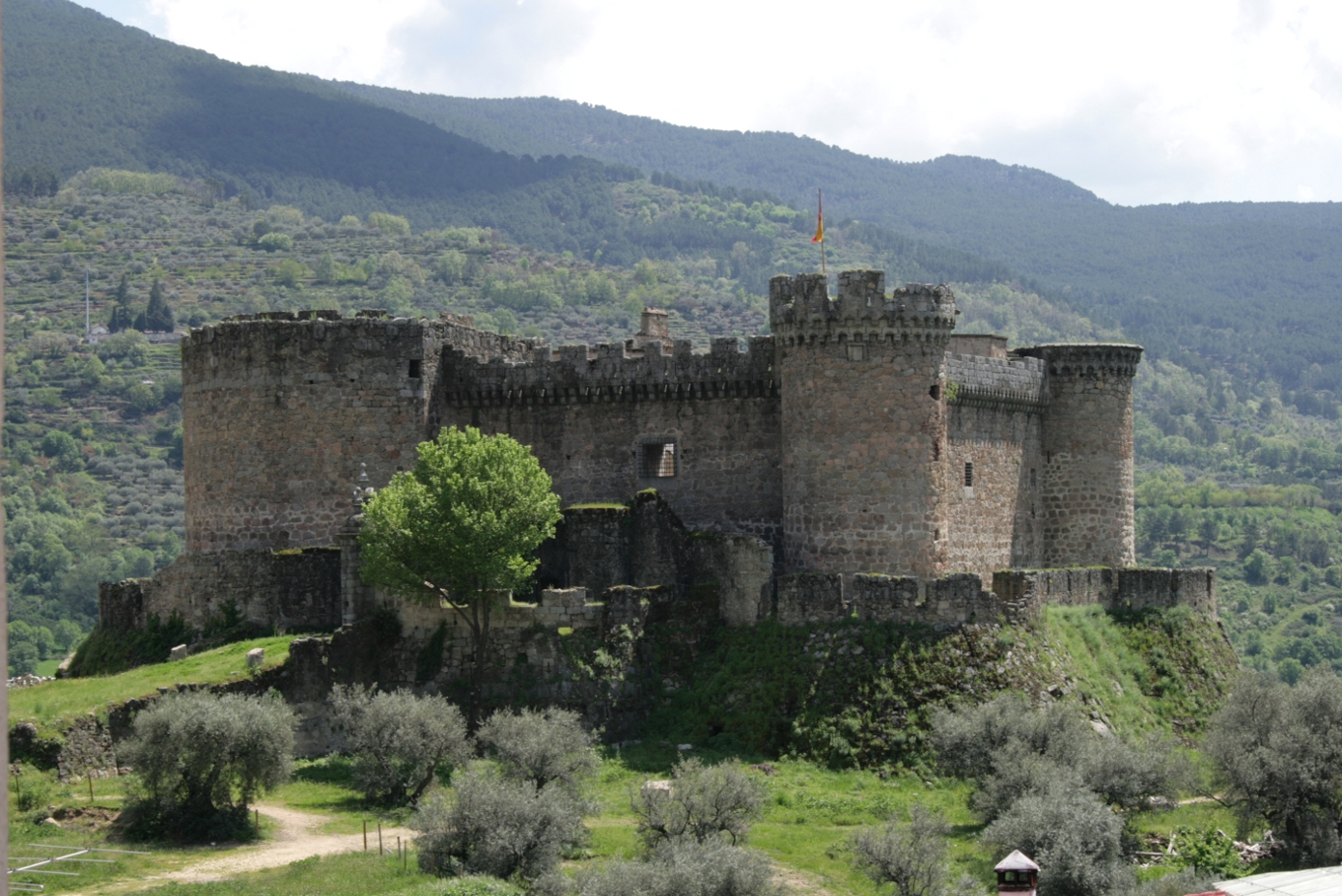
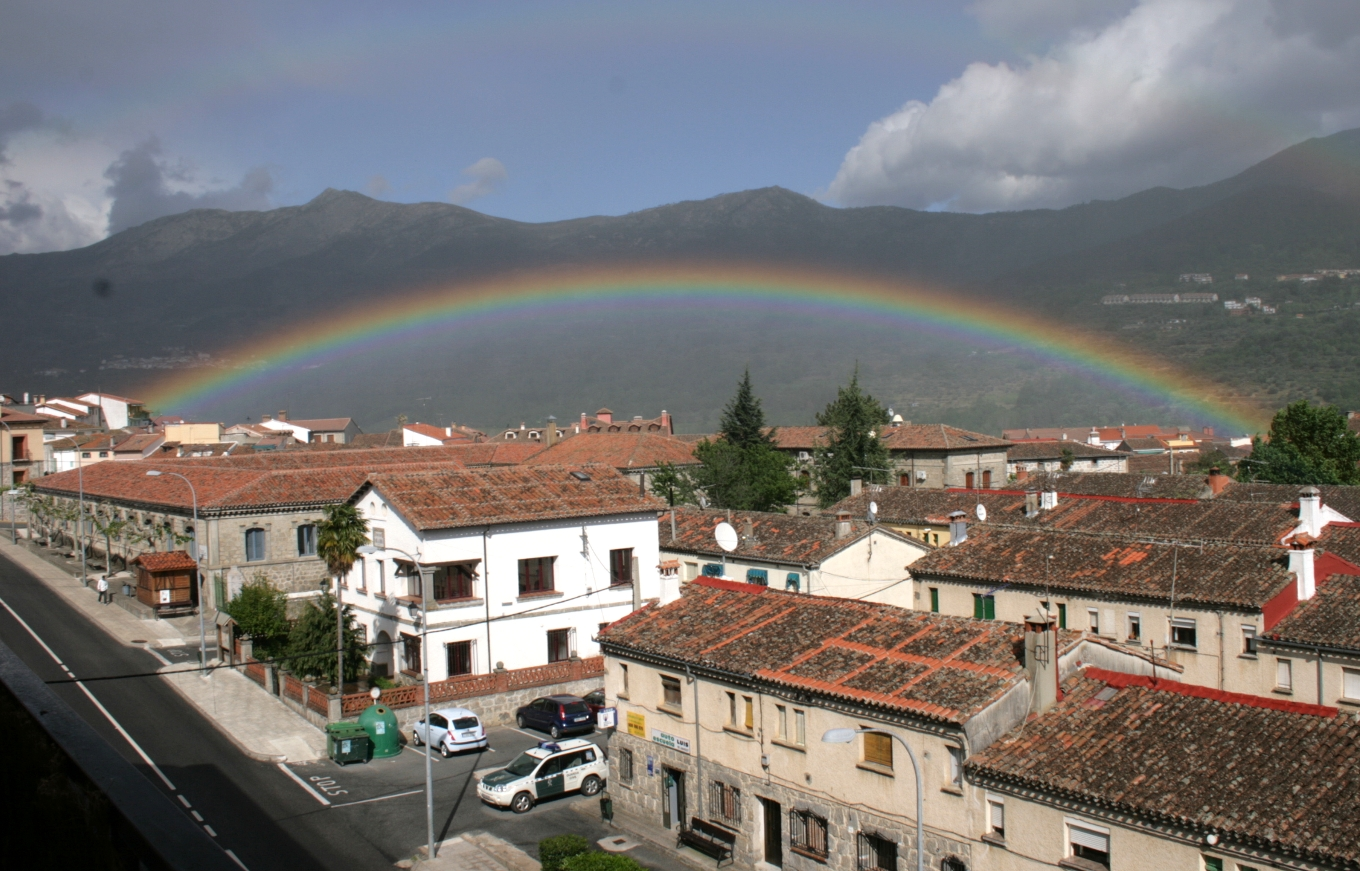
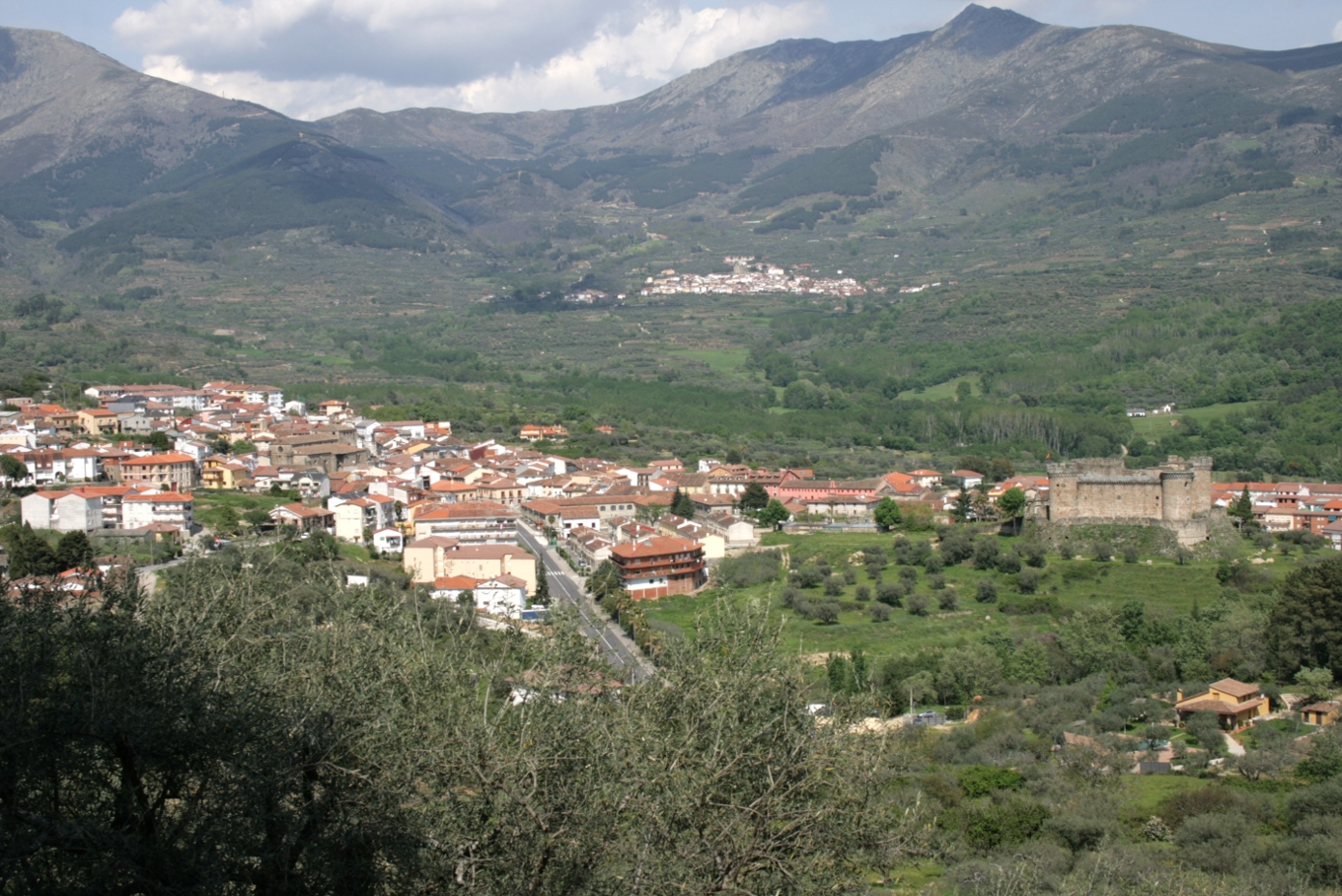
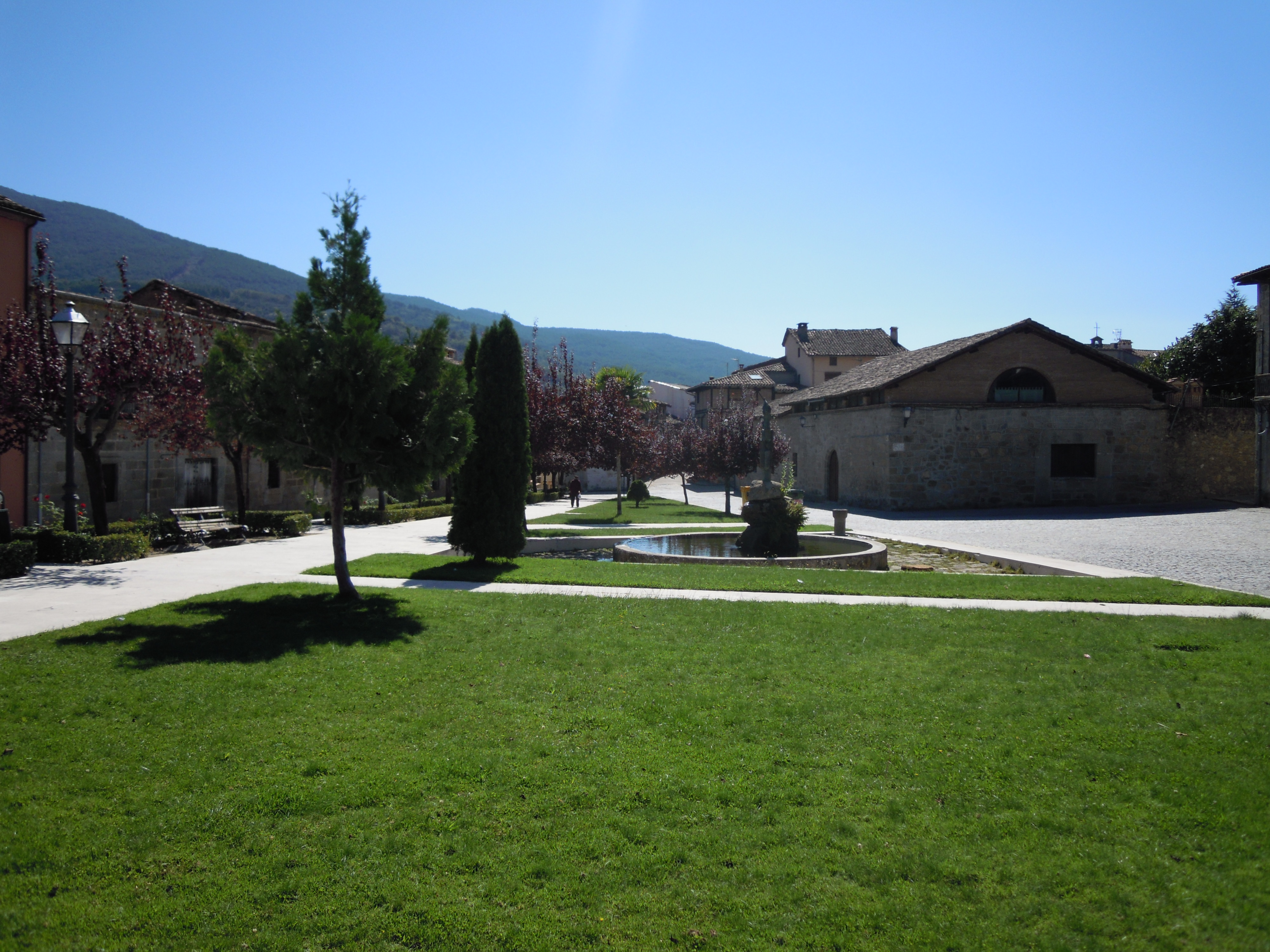
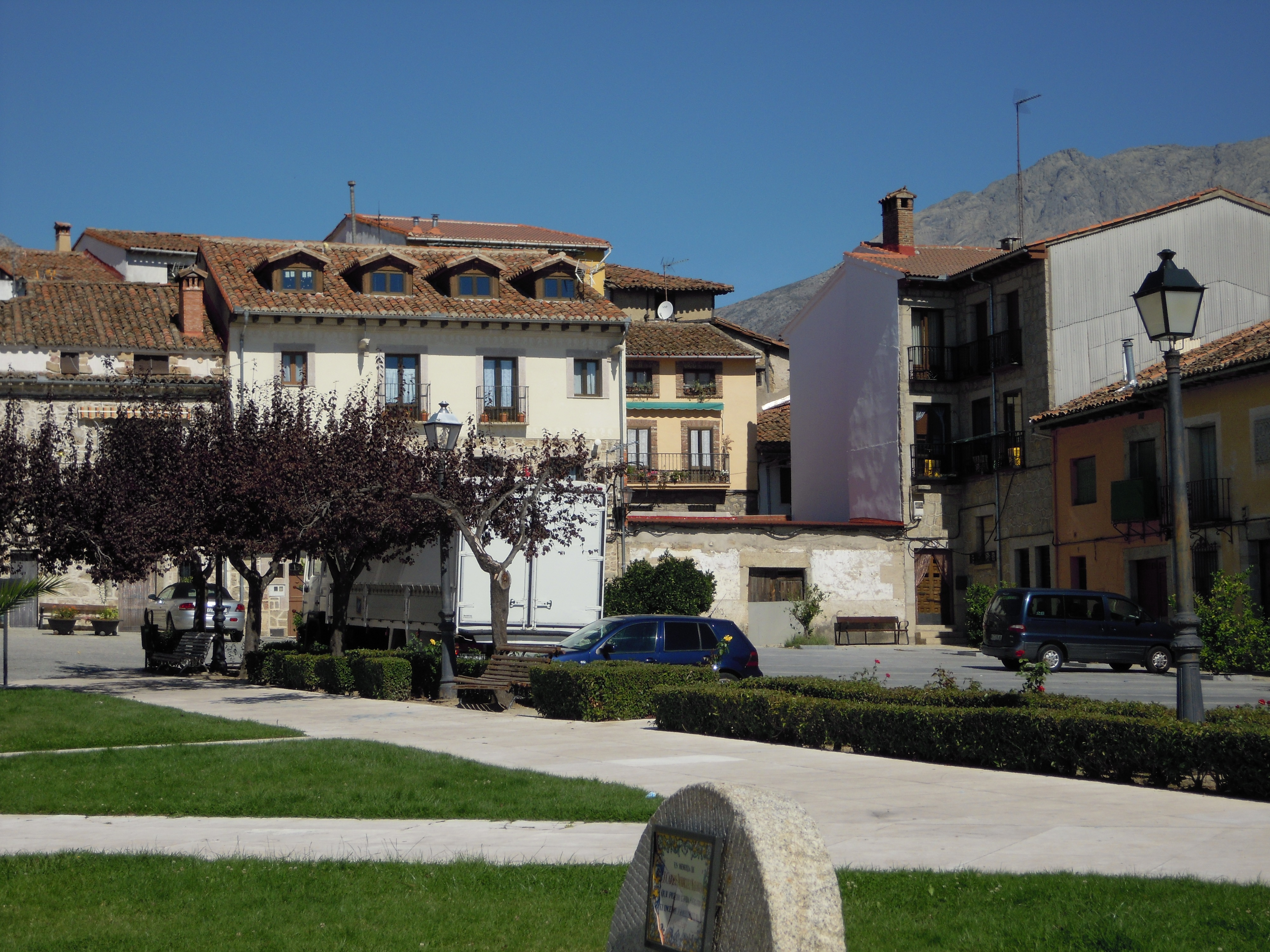

- Flag Coat of arms

- Location in Spain. Mombeltrán (Spain)
- Coordinates: 40°15′36″N 5°01′04″W
- Country: Spain
- Autonomous community: Castile and León
- Province: Ávila
- Municipality: Mombeltrán

Area
  - Total: 49 km^{2} (19 sq mi)

Population (2025-01-01)
  - Total: 922
  - Density: 19/km^{2} (49/sq mi)
- Time zone: UTC+1 (CET)
  - Summer (DST): UTC+2 (CEST)
- Website: Official website

Mombeltrán is a municipality located in the province of Ávila, Castile and León, Spain.

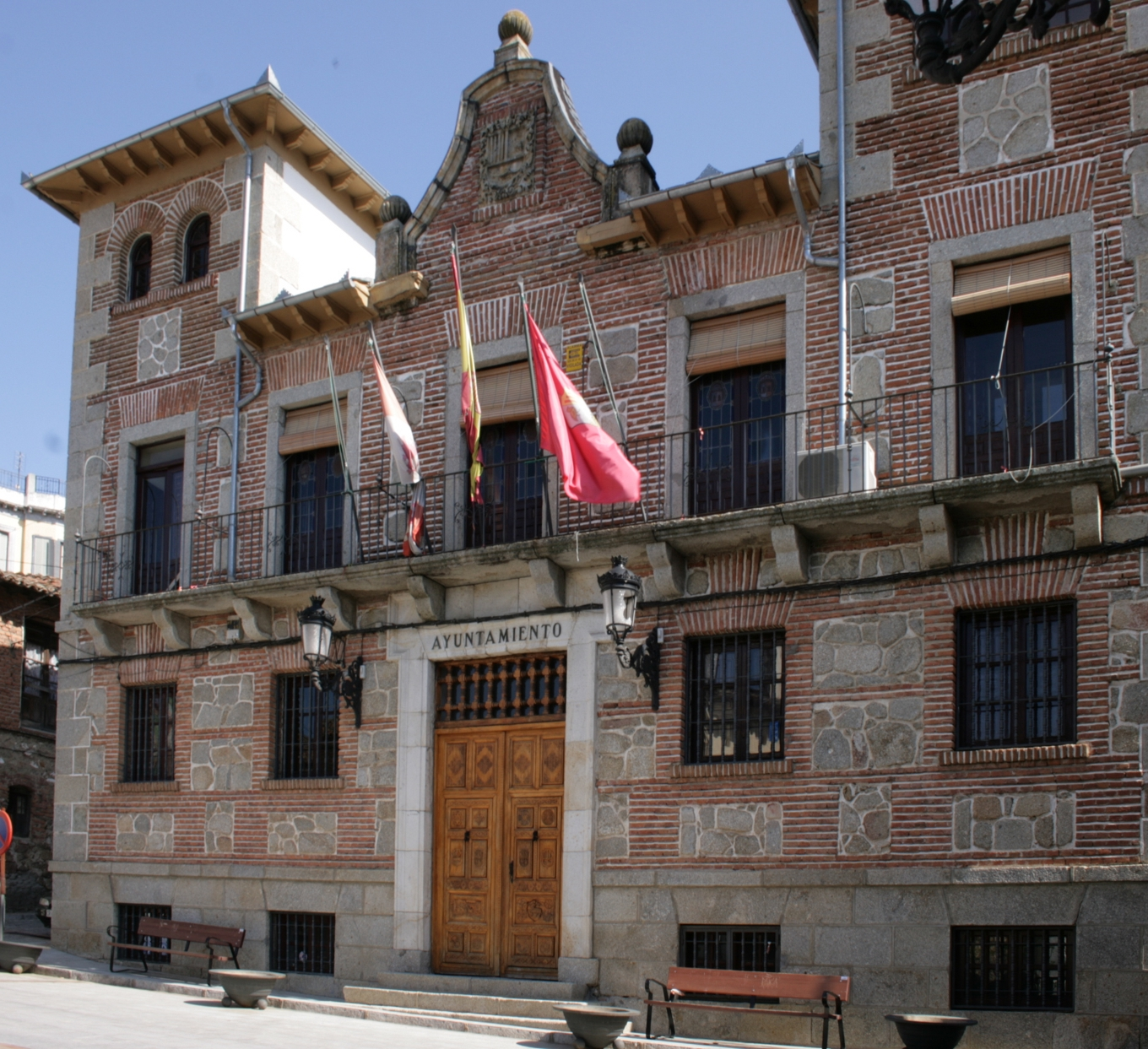
The town hall at Mombeltrán.

== Population ==
Historical population
Year	Pop.	±% p.a.
2023	917	—
2024	916	−0.11%
2025	922	+0.66%
Source: INE
