= Isabella de Luna =

Italian courtesan

- Born: Granada, Spain
- Died: 1564; Rome, Italy
- Occupation: Courtesan

Isabella de Luna (died 1564) was an Italian (originally Spanish) courtesan of Renaissance-era Rome. She was known as amusing company, having a kind heart but also a foul tongue. She was an accomplished musician. Amongst her patrons were members of the nobility and cardinals.

== Biography ==
Isabella was originally from Granada in Spain. She followed a soldier in the Imperial army of Charles V, Holy Roman Emperor, where she prostituted herself as a camp follower and was present at the Conquest of Tunis in 1535. Around 1536 she eventually settled in Rome, where she acquired a house in 1544 and became known as the most famous high class courtesan, or cortigiana onesta, of her generation.

As with all courtesans of her class, she had a main client, in her case Roberto Strozzi. Other clients included Cardinal Carafa, the Marquis de Montebello, Cardinal Farnese and author Matteo Bandello. According to Pierre Brantome, she was herself a client of one of her colleagues, Pandora, reputed to be one of the most beautiful in Rome, whom she paid for sexual services. A famous incident took place at a party, where Rocco Biancalana lost a bet to her after he had promised to make her blush, but in which she instead won the bet.

=== Transgressions ===
In 1555 de Luna was accused of holding a child captive in her house. Before being arrested she fled. She was captured in Rimini whilst on her way to Venice and returned to Rome's Castel Sant'Angelo to await trial. Two years later, in 1557 she was a witness at the trial of Roman nobleman Pompeo Giustini.

During an official crackdown on morality, de Luna and Pandora were arrested and the Pope threatened to burn them at the stake. On another occasion she faced imprisonment for debt but managed to pay the merchant she owed the money before she was incarcerated. However, as she had pretended to use the summons for toilet-paper and appeared before the judge drunk, she was sentenced to a public lashing of 50 strokes on her bare buttocks.

== Legacy ==
Isabella de Luna was portrayed in two contemporary novels by Matteo Bandello. One of which was Lives of Gallant Ladies.

== Bibliography ==
- Burckhardt, Jacob (1878). The Civilisation of the Period of the Renaissance in Italy. C. K. Paul & Company.
- Constantine, Helen (2011). Rome Tales: Stories. Oxford University Press. ISBN 9780199572465.
- Dickinson, Gladys (1960). Du Bellay in Rome. E. J. Brill.
- Eyewitness Travel Family Guide Rome. Dorling Kindersley Limited. 2015. p. 75. ISBN 9780241199565. "Isabella de Luna rome."
- Faderman, Lillian (2013). Scotch Verdict: The Real-Life Story That Inspired "The Children's Hour". Columbia University Press. ISBN 9780231533249.
- Keefer, Lubov Breit (1976). Music Angels: A Thousand Years of Patronage. Keefer.
- Masson, Georgina (1975). Courtesans of the Italian Renaissance. Secker & Warburg. ISBN 9780436273520.
- Robin, Diana Maury; Larsen, Anne R.; Levin, Carole (2007). Encyclopedia of Women in the Renaissance: Italy, France, and England. ABC-CLIO. ISBN 9781851097722.
- Shemek, Deanna (1998). Ladies Errant: Wayward Women and Social Order in Early Modern Italy. Duke University Press. ISBN 9780822321675.
- X, Jacobus (1904). Crossways of Sex: A Study in Eroto-pathology. British Bibliophiles' Society, privately issued for the subscribers.
- Zafra, Enriqueta (21 October 2014). "El caso de las "mujeres sueltas": Isabella de Luna, prostituta en el ejército imperial y cortesana española en Roma, y la Monja Alférez, Catalina de Erauso". Hispanic Review (in Spanish). 82 (4): 487–504. doi:10.1353/hir.2014.0038. ISSN 1553-0639. S2CID 162321031.
