= Peteroa =

Town and fortress in Maule Region, Chile

Coordinates: 35.017°S 71.433°W

Peteroa is a small town west southwest of the town of Sagrada Familia, Chile.

Peteroa is also the name of the location of the fortress built by Lautaro and the site of the Battle of Peteroa. This location is uncertain and sometimes confused with the place on the Mataquito River where Lautaro was killed during the Battle of Mataquito in 1557. His fortress of Peteroa built in 1556 was located near Teno "twenty leagues from the city of Santiago". A soldier in this campaign under Juan Godíñez, Alonso Lopez de la Raigada refers to the 1556 fortress as "Peteroa" and the camp where Lautaro was killed as "Mataquito" and also refers to "Peteroa y Mataquito" as separate places. Pedro Mariño de Lobera does not give a place name to the location of the 1556 fortress. He does call the place of the 1557 battle he took part in as being at the "lugar de Mataquito". The contemporary chronicler Alonso de Góngora Marmolejo gives no place names to either location in his account.

Peteroa is named as the location of the confluence of the rivers Teno, Pumaiten, and Lontué to form the Mataquito River in the eighteenth century description of the province of Maule. The current town of Peteroa may be the vicinity where this fortress was located on the south bank of the Mataquito river and his second camp was located across the Mataquito river on its north bank.

== Sources ==
- Jerónimo de Vivar, Crónica y relación copiosa y verdadera de los reinos de Chile (Chronicle and abundant and true relation of the kingdoms of Chile) ARTEHISTORIA REVISTA DIGITAL; Crónicas de América (on line in Spanish)
- Alonso de Góngora Marmolejo, SCID%253D10200%2526ISID%253D404%2526JNID%253D12,00.html Historia de Todas las Cosas que han Acaecido en el Reino de Chile y de los que lo han gobernado (1536-1575) (History of All the Things that Have happened in the Kingdom of Chile and of those that have governed it (1536-1575)), University of Chile: Document Collections in complete texts: Cronicles (on line in Spanish)
- Pedro Mariño de Lobera, Crónica del Reino de Chile, escrita por el capitán Pedro Mariño de Lobera....reducido a nuevo método y estilo por el Padre Bartolomé de Escobar. Edición digital a partir de Crónicas del Reino de Chile Madrid, Atlas, 1960, pp. 227-562, (Biblioteca de Autores Españoles; 569-575). Biblioteca Virtual Miguel de Cervantes (on line in Spanish)
- Vicente Carvallo y Goyeneche, Descripcion Histórico Geografía del Reino de Chile (Description Historical Geography of the Kingdom of Chile), University of Chile: Document Collections in complete texts: Cronicles (on line in Spanish)
- José Toribio Medina, Colección de documentos inéditos para la historia de Chile, Vols. 6-7, IV.— Información de senidos de Alonso López de la Eaigada, vecino de la ciudad de Santiago de Chile. (Archivo de Indias, Patronato, 1-5-34/18), Vols. 6-7 published by Impr. y Encuadernacido Barcelona; v.8-30 by Impr. Elzeviriana., 1901.
- Guevara, Tomás, Historia de Curicó, Alicante : Biblioteca Virtual Miguel de Cervantes, 2000
