= Battle of Angol =

1564 battle of the Arauco War

Coordinates: 37°45′29.22″S 72°41′56.73″W

- Part of the Arauco War
Date	March 25, 1564
Location	Vicinity of Los Infantes, Chile
Result	Spanish victory

Belligerents
Spanish Empire	Mapuches

Commanders and leaders
Lorenzo Bernal del Mercado	Illangulién †

Strength
60 Spanish soldiers (including 12 arqubusiers and a field gun); 500 Indian auxiliaries	4,000 warriors

Casualties and losses
No dead, many wounded	1,000 killed, many more wounded and many captured

The Battle of Angol was fought between the Mapuche and the Spanish Empire on 25 March 1564 as part of Arauco War.

In Los Infantes captain Lorenzo Bernal del Mercado had discovered that the rebels had constructed a pukara close by, establishing a blockade of the city, additionally natives under the toqui Illangulién had chosen an impregnable position in a marsh. A Mapuche detachment located themselves in a third position awaiting reinforcements from their main body at the old position. Seeing that this position was weak the Spanish engaged this position. In the battle the Spanish drove the Mapuche out of their pukara and pursued them down to the river bank and drove them into the river, where they were trapped and 1,000 Mapuches were killed, including the toqui Illanguelén.

== History ==
In Los Infantes captain Lorenzo Bernal del Mercado had discovered that the rebels had constructed a pukara close by, establishing a blockade of the city. Lorenzo Bernal ordered a reconnaissance patrol and he observed that the natives under the toqui Illangulién had chosen an impregnable position in a marsh and chose to retire. Illangulién's troops then moved to a second position, nearer to Angol, to which captain Lorenzo Bernal responded with a new reconnaissance.

Finding that this new position also was impregnable he again retired. Feeling victorious and believing the destruction of Angol was imminent, a Mapuche detachment located themselves in a third position awaiting reinforcements from their main body at the old position. This time, seeing their dangerous proximity to Los Infantes, captain Bernal chose to attack the position before more Mapuches arrived. In the battle the Spanish drove the Mapuche out of their pukara and pursued them down to the river bank and drove them into the river, where they were trapped and 1,000 Mapuches were killed, including the toqui Illanguelén, and many more were wounded or captured. Bernal ordered some of the captives killed and others lost hands or feet. When the news reached the rest of the Mapuche army coming to attack Angol, they dispersed.

== Sources ==
- Alonso de Góngora Marmolejo, Historia de Todas las Cosas que han Acaecido en el Reino de Chile y de los que lo han gobernado (1536-1575) (History of All the Things that Have happened in the Kingdom of Chile and of those that have governed it (1536-1575)), Edición digital a partir de Crónicas del Reino de Chile, Madrid, Atlas, 1960, pp. 75–224, (on line in Spanish)
  - Capítulo XLVI De cómo se juntaron los indios de la comarca de Angol y vinieron sobre la ciudad por tres partes, y fueron desbaratados por el capitán Lorenzo Bernal
- Pedro Mariño de Lobera, Crónica del Reino de Chile, escrita por el capitán Pedro Mariño de Lobera....reducido a nuevo método y estilo por el Padre Bartolomé de Escobar. Edición digital a partir de Crónicas del Reino de Chile Madrid, Atlas, 1960, pp. 227-562, (Biblioteca de Autores Españoles; 569-575). Biblioteca Virtual Miguel de Cervantes (on line in Spanish)
  - Capítulo XXII De cómo se despobló la casa fuerte de Arauco y de la victoria que el capitán Lorenzo Bernal alcanzó del general indio llamado Quiromanite en la ciudad de los Infantes
