= Gualemo =

Gualemo was the name by which the Spaniards knew the tribe of Promaucaes inhabiting the Lontué River valley of Chile and was the name early Spaniards gave to that region. Gualemo is also the name of one of the arms of the lower Lontué River that created several islands of fertile alluvium that existed near the confluence with the Teno River as late as 1899.

Gualemo is also the Spanish corruption of the name of Coelemu the Moluche aillarehue located between the Itata and Bureo Rivers in the modern Biobío Region of Chile.

== Sources ==
- Thomas Guevara, Historia de Curicó Alicante : Biblioteca Virtual Miguel de Cervantes, 2000]
- Francisco Solano Asta-Buruaga y Cienfuegos, Diccionario geográfico de la República de Chile, SEGUNDA EDICIÓN CORREGIDA Y AUMENTADA, NUEVA YORK, D. APPLETON Y COMPAÑÍA. 1899.
