= Lautaro =

16th-century leader of the Mapuche people

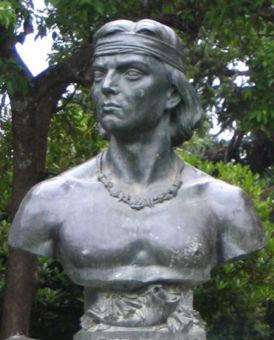
- Bust of Lautaro
- Born: Leftraru c. 1534; Treguaco, Chile
- Died: April 29, 1557 (aged 22–23); Maule Region, Chile
- Spouse: Guacolda
- Military career
- Allegiance: Mapuches
- Service years: 6
- Rank: Toqui
- Nicknames: Levtaru, Lautaro, Felipe
- Conflicts: Arauco War: Battle of Tucapel; Battle of Marihueñu; Battle of Peteroa; Battle of Mataquito

Lautaro (Anglicized as 'Levtaru') (Mapudungun: Lef-Traru "swift hawk") (Spanish pronunciation: [lawˈtaɾo]; c. 1534 – April 29, 1557) was a young Mapuche toqui known for leading the indigenous resistance against Spanish conquest in Chile and developing the tactics that would continue to be employed by the Mapuche during the long-running Arauco War. He is revered among Mapuche and non-Mapuche Chileans and Argentinians for his resistance against foreign conquest, servitude and cruelty.

Captured by Spanish forces in his early youth, Lautaro spent his teenage years as a personal servant of chief conquistador Pedro de Valdivia. He graduated from servant to stableman; in this job he saw that their horses were not godlike creatures like his people thought (the biggest animal they knew was the llama). He escaped in 1551 and told his people that the conquistadores and their horses were just mortals and they could defeat them. Back among his people he was declared Toqui and led Mapuche warriors into a series of victories against the Spaniards, culminating in the Battle of Tucapel in December 1553, where Valdivia was killed. The outbreak of a typhus plague, a drought and a famine prevented the Mapuche from taking further actions to expel the Spaniards in 1554 and 1555. Between 1556 and 1557, a small group of Mapuche commanded by Lautaro attempted to reach Santiago to liberate the whole of Central Chile from Spanish rule. Lautaro's attempts ended in 1557 when he was killed in an ambush by the Spaniards.

== Early life ==
Lautaro was the son of a Mapuche lonko (a chief who holds office during peacetime) called Curiñancu (Kurüñamku in the Mapuche language, Mapudungun, 'aguilucho negro' meaning 'black harrier') and was born in 1533. He lived a normal life until, at the age of 11, he was captured by the Spaniards and forced into servitude by Don Pedro de Valdivia and became his personal servant. Since it was difficult for the Spaniards to pronounce Lautaro's original name, Leftraru, they gave him the name of Felipe Lautaro. Don Pedro de Valdivia was a Spanish conqueror of Chile and then became the captain general of Chile.

Lautaro learned the military ways and skills of the Spaniards' army by observation. He was witness to atrocities committed by the Spaniards on captive Mapuche warriors. According to several historians, in the immediate vicinity of what is now the city of Concepción, Chile, Pedro de Valdivia ordered his men to cut off the feet and hands of every Mapuche in Curiñancu's tribe, for resisting Spanish colonization, among them Curiñancu and his wife, Lautaro’s parents, in order to teach the Mapuche a lesson. It is said that because of Valdivia's command to cut off the toes of the Mapuche warriors, the Spanish soldiers named the place "El Valle de La Mocha", whose name has been maintained over time. A great hatred of the Spanish and particularly of Pedro de Valdivia was born in the young Lautaro because of this incident. After his capture they made him a Yanakuna, meaning a "black slave" in Quechua. He remained a prisoner of the Spaniards for three years. As he kept his personal hatred of Valdivia hidden, Lautaro soon became his personal page. Among his daily tasks as a page, he was in charge of taking care of Valdivia's horses and always accompanying them into battle and military exercises. This is how he learned not to fear horses and even become a good rider himself.

During this period he had a certain level of friendship with one of Valdivia's principal captains by the name of Marcos Veas, who taught Lautaro how to use different kinds of weapons and cavalry tactics. This was a typical practice because as a yanakuna, Lautaro was responsible to serve as an indigenous assistant during battles.

According to the Chilean novelist Isabel Allende in her historical novel, Inés del Alma Mía, the boy Lautaro had deliberately allowed himself to be captured by the Spaniards in order to learn their secrets, and made no attempt to escape until he felt he had learned enough. In any case, he fled twice, first in 1550 and for good in 1552. In 1553 (the year Lautaro turned 19), the Mapuche convened to decide how to respond to the Spanish invasion. The convention decided upon war. The toqui Caupolicán chose Lautaro as vice toqui because he had served as a page in the Spanish cavalry, and thereby possessed knowledge of how to defeat the mounted conquistadors. Lautaro introduced use of horses to the Mapuche and designed better combat tactics. He organized a large, cohesive army—a military formation unfamiliar to the Mapuche.

== Campaigns ==
=== Battle of Tucapel ===
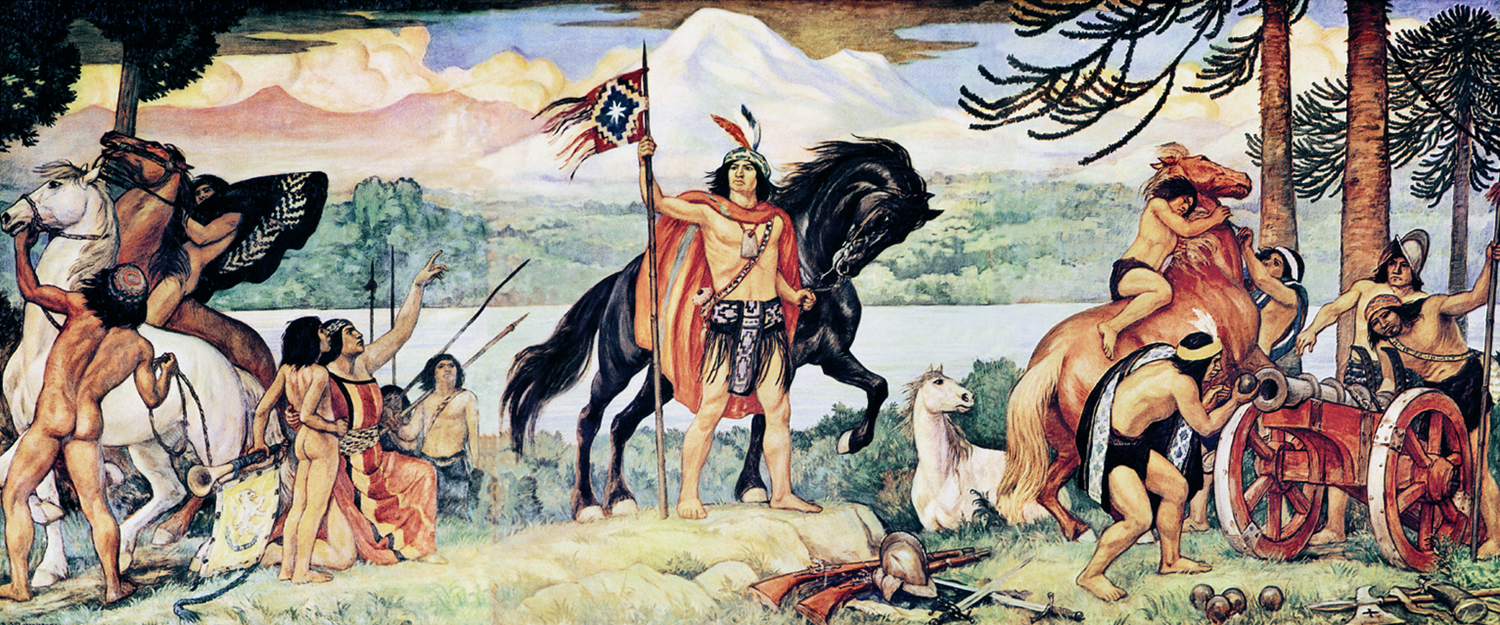
The young Lautaro (Pedro Subercaseaux, 1946)

With 6,000 warriors under his command, Lautaro attacked Fort Tucapel. The Spanish garrison could not withstand the assault and retreated to Purén. Lautaro seized the fort, sure that the Spaniards would attempt to retake it. That is exactly what Governor Valdivia tried to do with a reduced force, which was quickly surrounded and massacred by the Mapuche on Christmas Day, 1553. The Battle of Tucapel would be Pedro de Valdivia's last, as he was captured and then killed.

After the defeat at Tucapel, the Spaniards hastily reorganized their forces, reinforcing the defenses of Fort Imperial and abandoning the settlements of Confines and Arauco in order to strengthen Concepción. However, Mapuche tradition dictated a lengthy victory celebration, which kept Lautaro from realizing his desire to pursue the military advantage he had just gained. It was only in February 1554 that he succeeded in putting together an army of 8,000 men, just in time to confront a punitive expedition under the command of Francisco de Villagra.

=== Battle of Marihueñu ===
Lautaro chose the hill of Marihueñu to fight the Spaniards. He organized his forces in four divisions: two charged with containing and wearing down the enemy, a third held in reserve to launch a fresh attack as the Spaniards were about to crumble, and the last charged with cutting off their retreat. Additionally, a small group was sent to destroy the reed bridge the Spaniards had erected across the Bío-Bío River, which would further disrupt any attempted retreat of Villagra.

The Spanish attack broke the first Mapuche lines, but the quick response of the third division maintained the Mapuche position. Later, the wings of this division began to attack the Spanish flanks, and the fourth division attacked from behind. After hours of battle, only a small group of Spaniards managed to retreat. Despite this fresh victory, Lautaro was again unable to pursue the opportunity due to the celebrations and beliefs of his people. By the time he arrived at Concepción, it was already abandoned. He burned it, but his remaining forces were insufficient to continue the offensive, so the campaign came to an end.

In Santiago, Villagra reorganized his forces, and that same year of 1554, he departed again for Arauco and reinforced the strongholds of Imperial and Valdivia, without any interference from the Mapuche, who were dealing with their first epidemic of smallpox, which had been brought by the Spaniards.

In 1555, the Real Audiencia of Lima ordered Villagra to reconstruct Concepción, which was done under the command of Captain Alvarado. Upon learning of this, Lautaro successfully besieged Concepción with 4,000 warriors. Only 38 Spaniards managed to escape by sea the second destruction of the city.

=== Peteroa and the Battle of Mataquito ===
After the second rout at Concepción, Lautaro desired to attack Santiago. He found scant support for this plan from his troops, who soon dwindled to only 600, but he carried on. In October 1556, his northward march reached the Mataquito River, where he established a fortified camp at Peteroa. In the Battle of Peteroa, he repulsed attacking Spanish forces under the command of Diego Cano, and later held off the larger force commanded by Pedro de Villagra. Being advised that still more Spaniards were approaching, Lautaro decided to retreat towards the Maule River losing 200 warriors. With the Spaniards in hot pursuit, he was forced to retire beyond the Itata River. From there, he launched another campaign towards Santiago when Villagra's army passed him by on the way to save the remaining Spanish settlements in Araucanía. Lautaro had chosen to give Villagra's force the slip and head for the city to attack it.

Despite the Mapuche conducting stealth, the city's leaders learned of the advance and sent a small expedition to thwart it, buying time for word to be sent to Villagra to return to the city from the south. The Spanish forces met in the field, and from a member of the local ethnos, the Picunche, they learned the disposition of Lautaro's camp. At dawn, on April 29, 1557, the conquistadors launched a surprise attack from the hills of Caune, obtaining a decisive victory in the Battle of Mataquito in which Lautaro was killed early in the fighting. After the defeat of his army, his head was cut off and displayed in the plaza of Santiago.

== Legacy ==
Alonso de Ercilla, an officer in the Spanish forces early in the Araucanian war (who, as it happened, was only one year older than Lautaro), in the decade following his service composed that masterpiece of the Spanish Golden Age of literature—the epic poem, La Araucana—in which Lautaro is a central figure.

Lautaro is acclaimed in Chile as its first general, for uniting the dispersed Mapuche people and leading them in battle. He inflicted crushing defeats on Spanish armies which had armored horsemen wielding swords, metal war clubs, and steel-tipped lances, armored footmen as well, with their own swords and clubs, crossbows, and arquebuses, even though his own Mapuche were armed only with slings, bows and arrows, wooden spears, clubs, and axes. Remarkably, he did this not fighting a "guerilla" war, but in pitched battle.

His name was used by Francisco de Miranda when he founded the Lautaro Lodge, a secret Latin American independence society of the end of 18th century and the beginning of the 19th century. In the 20th century, Chilean author Pablo Neruda, the future Nobel Prize in Literature laureate, wrote a poem about him.

Lautaro appears in Civilization VI: Rise and Fall, an expansion of Civilization VI as the leader of the Mapuche civilization. His special ability decreases enemy city loyalty when the Mapuche kill a unit or pillage tiles inside the city's borders.

The Argentine football player Lautaro Martínez was named after the Mapuche hero.

== See also ==
- History of Chile
- Caupolicán
- Colocolo
- Chilean ship Lautaro
