= East Patagonia, Tierra del Fuego and Strait of Magellan dispute =

Argentina-Chile sovereignty dispute between 1842 & 1881

Map of the dispute of eastern Patagonia, Tierra del Fuego and the Strait of Magellan between Argentina and Chile (1842–1881)

The East Patagonia, Tierra del Fuego and Strait of Magellan Dispute or the Patagonia Question was the boundary dispute between Argentina and Chile during the 19th century for the possession of the southernmost territories of South America on the basis of disagreements over the boundaries corresponding to the uti possidetis juris inherited from the Spanish Empire, which were partly due to contradictory background information.

The extensive territory corresponds to approximately one million square kilometres, which represents 45% of the current surface of Argentina, all of the center and south of that country, and which, according to Chilean historiography, would have implied a loss for Chile of two-thirds of its nominal territory de jure.

Both countries started effectively occupying different parts of the disputed land, Chile the Strait of Magellan and its nearby territory in the Santa Cruz River as well as the Neuquén Valley, and Argentina the Pampas land as well with Chubut settled with Welsh people. Both countries also started having discussions of the legal title of each country on the land inherited from the Spanish Empire, which motivated the signing of the 1856 treaty between both countries that affirmed that both countries were committed to apply the uti possidetis juris on the border; something which they both disagreed on was which territories had been inherited by each of the two nations.

The decade of 1870 saw an intensification of the dispute in the southern part of Patagonia, which saw settlements from both countries in between of each other. The dispute was ended with the Boundary Treaty of 1881 between both countries which divided the territory. At the time of the signing, Chile had already triumphed at the Battle of Miraflores against Peru in the War of the Pacific (1879–1885), demonstrating its position of power; Argentina also started the Conquest of the Desert in 1878, intensifying it when Chile was in the war, occupying several parts of Patagonia.

== Background ==
=== Of occupation by the Spanish Empire ===
==== Strait of Magellan and surrounding territories ====
The location of Spanish settlements in the Strait of Magellan is shown with green dots. The bay of Primera Angostura is shown with a blue dot.

During the 16th-century Spanish explorers and conquerors attempt to found settlements in the Strait of Magellan, Pedro de Valdivia proposed the extension of the governorship of Chile to the strait, which was granted, and prior to this, he continued his expeditions in a southerly direction to found a settlement in the place, something that did not materialize when he encountered the araucanos.

In addition, other Spaniards during that century founded settlements in Primera Angostura, Ciudad Nombre de Jesús and Ciudad del Rey Don Felipe, later known as the port of Hunger due to the death of its inhabitants from food shortages, having planted seeds in the opposite seasons (not knowing that of the southern hemisphere).

During the 16th century the Captaincy General of Chile sought to implement a policy of southern territorial integration to connect Santiago to the Strait of Magellan. There was agreement on the "road to the Strait" project and the policy of founding towns in the south, in addition to the construction of roads for the structuring of the kingdom (Santiago-Concepción, Concepción-Valdivia, Castro-Ancud, Castro-Nahuelhuapi, Chiloé-Valdivia).

==== Expedition of Juan Ladrillero ====
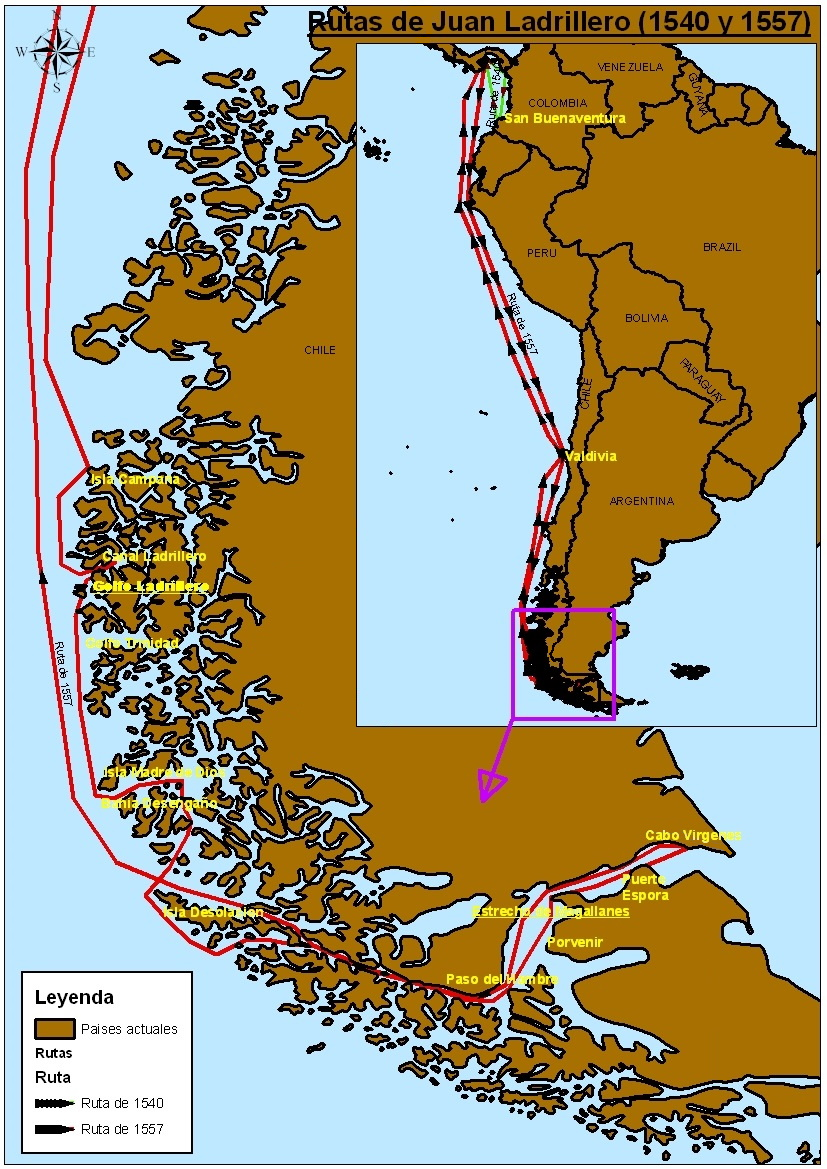
Juan Ladrillero Routes (1540–1557).

The Viceroy of Peru, Andrés Hurtado de Mendoza, aware of Juan Ladrillero's seafaring skills and expertise, and although he was already of advanced age, chose him to accompany his son García Hurtado de Mendoza who would leave for the Kingdom of Chile as governor, and who had as one of his tasks to recognize the western mouth of the Strait of Magellan, which had been ordered by a Royal Decree. The squadron composed of three ships and a galleon set sail from El Callao on February 2, 1557, arrived at Coquimbo and continued its navigation towards the south in demand of Quiriquina Island and then headed to Valdivia to enlist the ships with which it would carry out the reconnaissance of the Strait. Two ships of 50 barrels each and manned by 60 men were enlisted. The ship San Luis was commanded by Juan Ladrillero himself and the other, the San Sebastián, was placed under the command of Francisco Cortés Ojea. It left the city of Valdivia, on Wednesday, November 17, 1557, with Juan Ladrillero as captain and assisted by Captain Francisco Cortés Ojea.

He armed two ships of 450 barrels each and manned by 60 men. Ladrillero took command of the San Luis with Hernán Gallego as pilot and Cortés Ojea commanded the San Sebastián with Pedro Gallego as pilot. They sailed from Valdivia on November 17, 1557, calling at the Golfo de Penas, to which he named the Alcachofado inlet, they entered the Patagonian channels through the Fallos channel, at the exit of which the ships separated and did not meet again.

Cortés Ojea sailed for two months the existing channels between Wellington Island and the Strait of Magellan, in the Golfo Trinidad he dismantled the San Sebastián and with its remains built a small brigantine which he christened San Salvador returning to the north and anchoring in Valdivia on October 1, 1558.

Ladrillero entered the channels through the West Channel He returned to the north through the Wide Channel, the Indian Pass and the English Narrows, and when he reached the Gulf of Penas, he returned south again via the Pacific Ocean.

He reconnoitered the southern coast of Concepción Channel and entered the channels through Nelson Strait and discovered the region of Última Esperanza, navigated the Kirke Channel and explored Obstruction Seno, initially believing that he had reached the Strait of Magellan.

He returned to the Pacific looking for the entrance to the Strait, but this time he continued south, recognizing the Desolación Island, he entered the Strait navigating surely the Abra Channel. At Cape Possession, where he arrived on August 9, 1558, he performed the ceremony of taking possession of it. After exploring the eastern mouth, it returned to the north, enduring all kinds of calamities, lack of food and death of its crew members, managing to land in the Bahía de Concepción where it anchored with only the captain, a sailor and a black servant, who died a few days later, except Ladrillero who died in mid-1574.

==== Nahuelhuapi Province and explorations in the interior of Eastern Patagonia ====
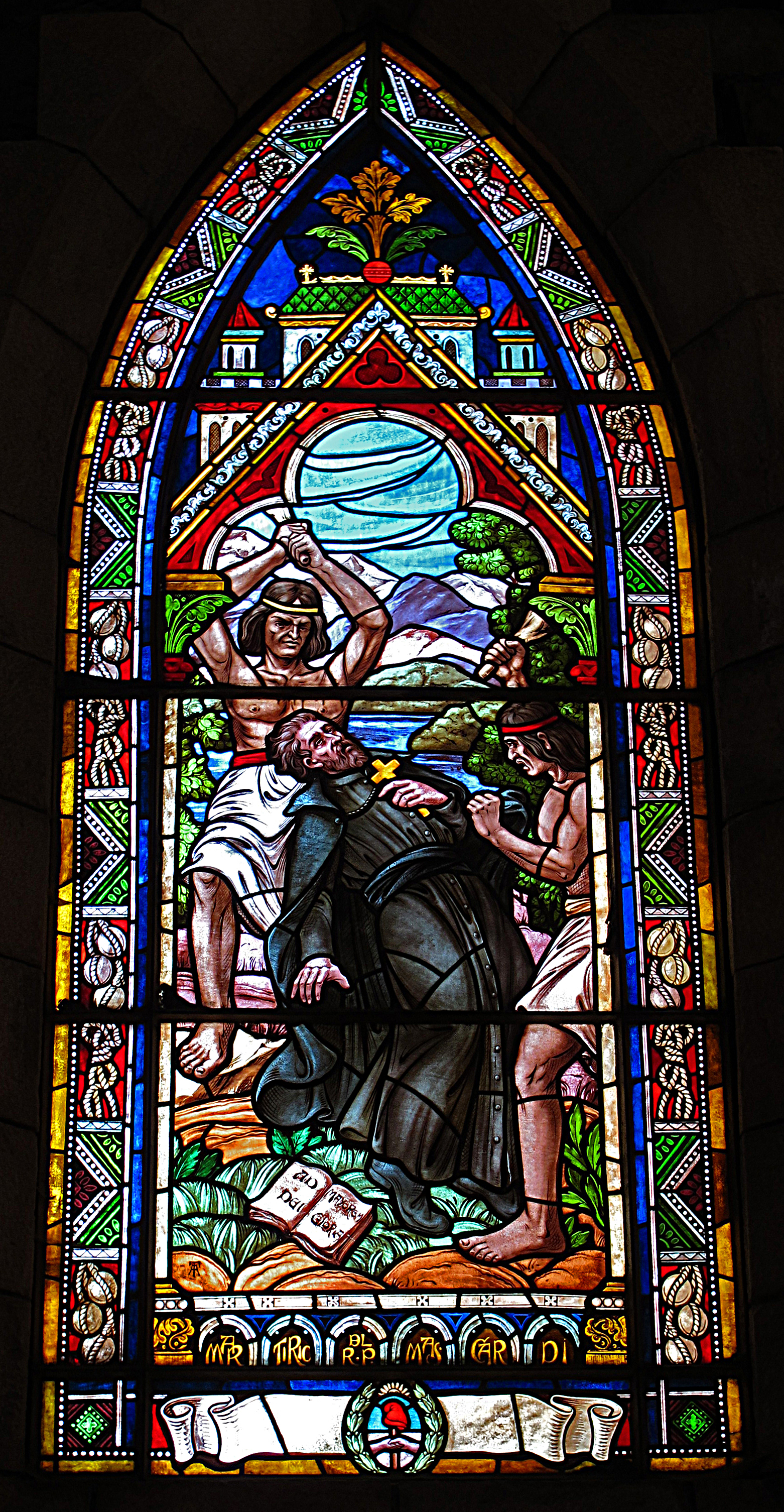
Great polychrome stained glass window depicting the martyrdom of Father Nicolás Mascardi in the Cathedral of Our Lady of Nahuel Huapi

During the Hispanic period there were numerous expeditions to the Magellanic lands as part of the jurisdiction of the Kingdom of Chile, crossing the mountain ranges of Valdivia and Chiloé seeking the subjugation and evangelization of the Puelche, Poyas and Tehuelche Indians of Eastern Patagonia and the search for the mythical City of the Caesars. Thanks to the missionaries Nicolás Mascardi, Van der Meeren (Laguna), Zúñiga, Guglielmo and Elguea, the Todos los Santos Lake, the Vuriloche Pass and the Nahuelhuapi Lake, where there was a Catholic temple, were discovered. Father Mascardi spent four years as a missionary among the indigenous people of the area, who were not only Poyas, but also Pehuenches and Puelches. At that time, the process of Araucanization of these peoples had not yet begun.

During those years he undertook three explorations to the south and east, in search of the City of the Caesars. There is not much data on the regions he would have visited. The most optimistic authors consider him to have reached the Santa Cruz River or Puerto San Julián, passing through Musters Lake. Other authors, more moderate, suppose that he would have explored only certain places in the northwest of the current province of Chubut. In all these explorations he was accompanied by native guides. But, once he tried to return briefly to Old Chile, the guides refused to lead him to that destination, so as not to be deprived of his presence.

The last of his explorations was carried out in 1673, up to the vicinity of a lake that has not been specified. In that place, perhaps in the month of September, he was attacked by a rival Tehuelche partiality of the Poyas, and killed by blows of boleadora and arrows. The guides who accompanied him managed to bury him and fled; to return two years later, guiding Spanish explorers who rescued his corpse and some religious ornaments.

The Captaincy General of Chile continued sending expeditions to the area, even after the death of Mascardi in the area of the Deseado River. Legally, the area around Nahuelhuapi was considered part of the Kingdom of Chile and was considered part of the section of the future road to the Strait of Magellan.

The Franciscan missionary Fray Francisco Menéndez, in 1783 explored the mountain range of the province of Chiloé, and from 1791 made trips to the Nahuelhuapi province, continuing with the missions started by the Jesuits in the previous century.

In addition, the construction of the Castro-Nahuelhuapi road was contemplated from the Kingdom of Chile.

==== Atlantic coast of Patagonia ====
Spanish establishments in Atlantic Patagonia

In 1768, Captain General Ambrosio O'Higgins, sent a letter to the Council of the Indies urgently requesting authorization to found settlements on the Patagonian Atlantic coast to take possession of the area and prevent foreign nations such as Great Britain from advancing, textually "attending to the internal defense of the Kingdom".

The following year the letter was presented at an extraordinary meeting of the Council of the Indies in Madrid in which the attorney general expressed:

Don Ambrosio O'Higgins sends a presentation, his date in Santiago de Chile on July 7, 1769, accompanied by some notes on the current state of that Kingdom, missions and populations of the frontier, with reflections on the possibility and precision of extending them both along the East and West Coast of Cape Horn and Magellanic Lands, as well as the Pampas of Buenos Aires

— Consejo de Indias, 1769

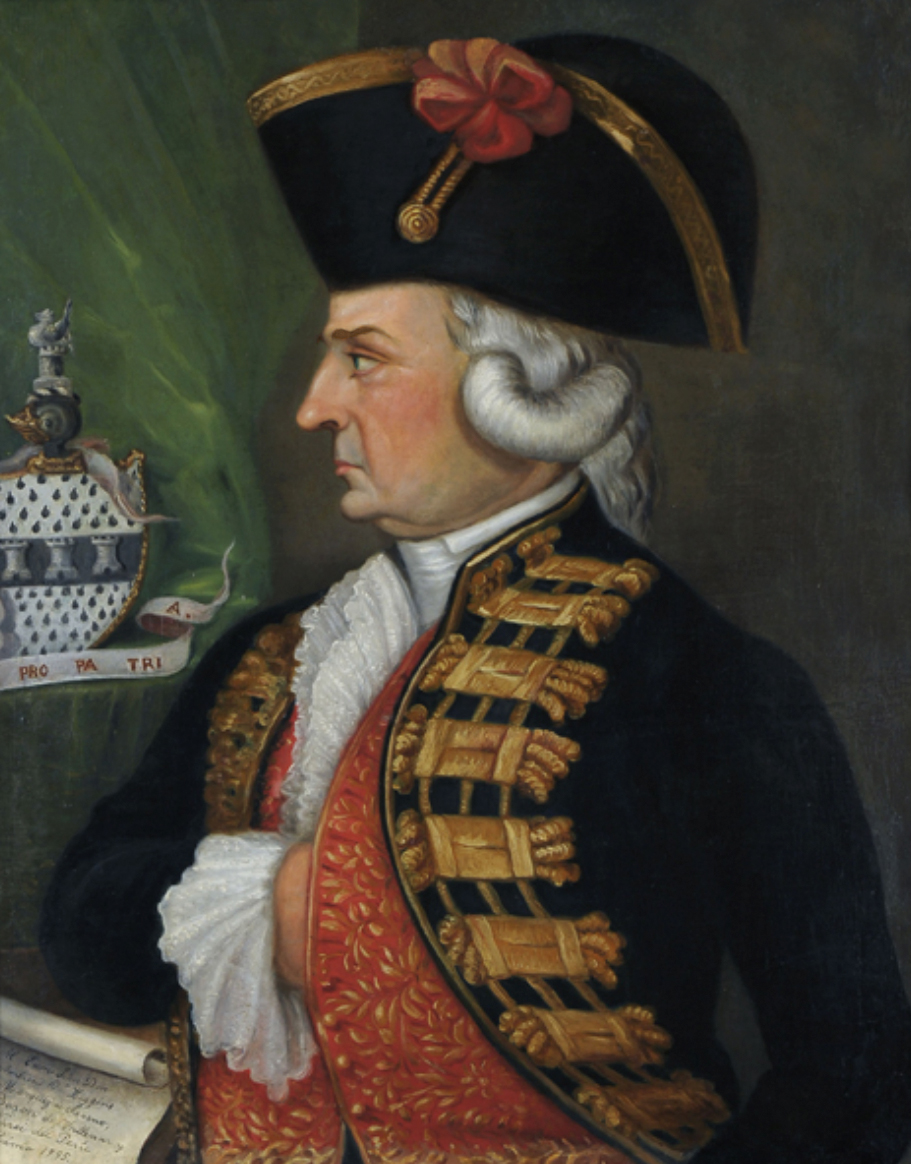
The king complies with the recommendations of Governor of the Kingdom of Chile and later Viceroy of Peru, Ambrosio O'Higgins to populate Eastern Patagonia in view of the threat of other European nations to take advantage of the absence of the Spanish Empire in the area.

The recommendations of Ambrosio O'Higgins on the foundation of establishments in Atlantic Patagonia were listened to and put into practice by King Charles III of Spain, who ordered the viceroys of Buenos Aires, from 1778 onwards, the foundation of these on the said coasts. According to Chilean historiography, these settlements were depending accidentally on the viceroyalty due to reasons of proximity, without this altering the political jurisdiction of the Atlantic Patagonian coast, making it explicit as part of the kingdom of Chile in the royal order of June 8, 1778. According to Argentine historiography, the settlements remained permanently dependent on the Viceroyalty because they were within its jurisdiction.

In the instructions for establishing forts and settlements on the coast that runs from the Río de la Plata to the Strait of Magellan, dated June 8, 1778, signed by the Universal Minister of the Indies, José de Gálvez, and which accompanied the Royal Order of March 24, 1778, it is stated that:

[...] There are two principal locations to which we must direct our attention, starting with the establishment of certain outposts that will be progressively improved and serve as staging points for others. The first is the Bahía Sin Fondo or Punta de San Matías in which the Río Negro which flows for about three hundred leagues into the Kingdom of Chile drains, and this circumstance makes its occupation more precise and that a provisional fort be erected there. [...] that the commissioner of Bahía Sin Fondo make the most exact reconnaissance of the immediate country, trying to take from them all the possible advantage for the solidity and increase of that establishment extending his explorations to the internal lands, he will try to direct them by sea as the first object, towards the mouth of the Colorado River or of the Barrancas, which also goes towards the Kingdom of Chile, and is located about twenty leagues north of the Negro River that forms the port of the Bahía Sin Fondo. [...] And as for the other instructions that must be given to the Commissioners, these will be issued with greater knowledge and accuracy by the Viceroy of Buenos Aires, whose military expertise and zeal, aided by the activity of the intendant of those Provinces, will provide everything this important expedition needs. The King entrusts this to the care of those officers, who will take all the necessary measures for its complete success, relying on their true love for his royal service and the great obligations their offices impose upon them, which will spare no diligence, effort, or exertion that may facilitate the success His Majesty desires. Signed: José de Gálvez.

— Royal Order, June 8, 1778

To alter altering this jurisdiction, the sovereign created a new job for those who would direct the new settlements, that of commissioner-superintendent, reserving for himself the power to appoint them and not to the viceroys.

==== Parliaments with the indigenous people of the region ====
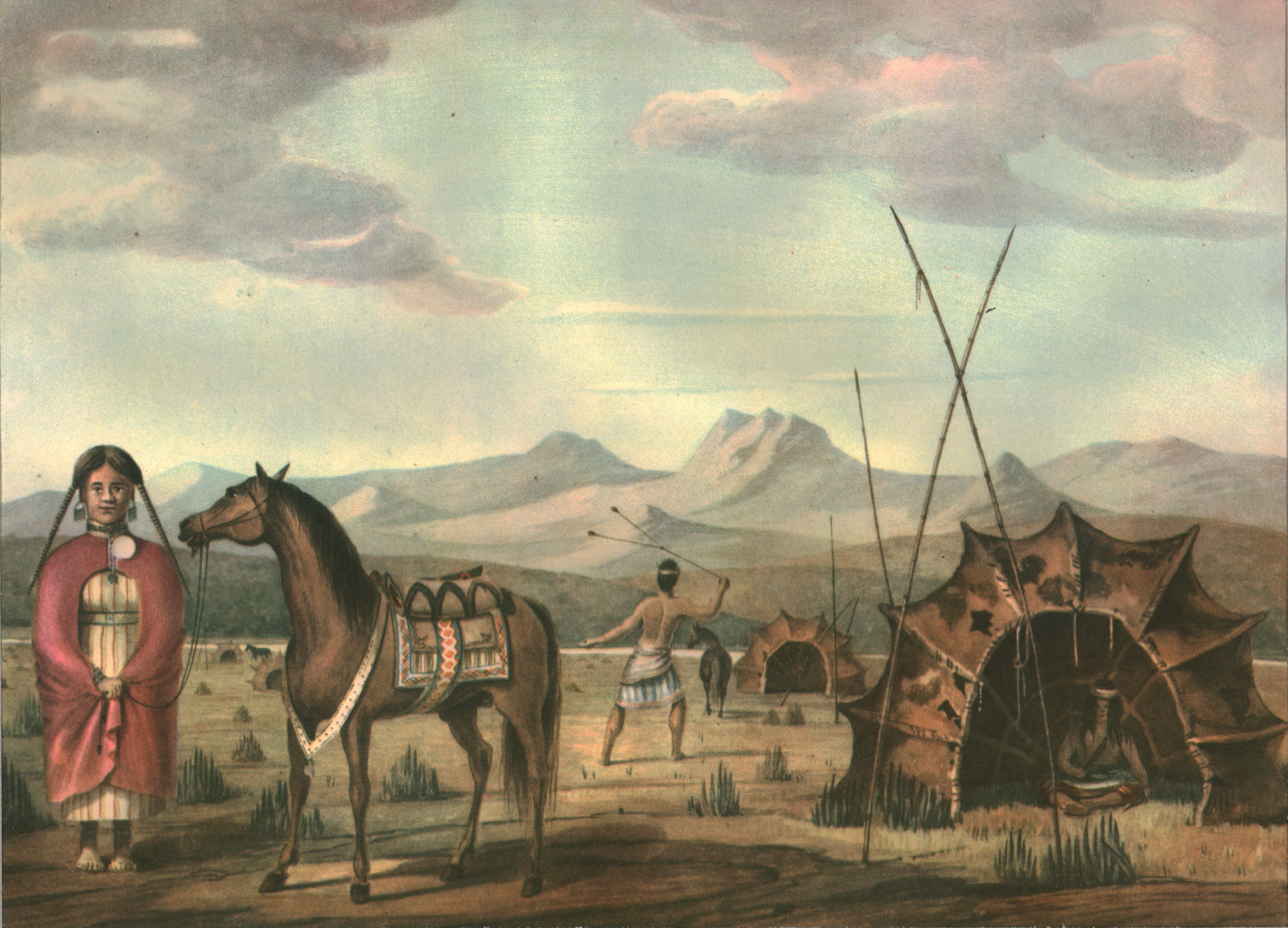
Pampa People

In addition Ambrosio O'Higgins sought the incorporation of the Indians pampas, present in Eastern Patagonia who participated in the parliaments held between 1771 and 1793 and convened by Ambrosio and later ones such as the Parliament of Negrete of 1803 held with the "Indians of Chile" and which reaffirms the prohibition of incursions on the Pampa south of Buenos Aires, where these mentioned indigenous tribes inhabited.

In 1793, Governor O'Higgins, held the Parliament of Negrete in which he sought to parley with indigenous tribes on both sides of the Andes, including the Patagonian pampas, considering them part of the kingdom. Ambrosio proposed to build a road between the southern part of old Chile and Buenos Aires to promote trade between these domains and also to further incorporate the Pampas Indians.

==== Territories east of the mountain range in the Talca area ====
In 1736, the intendant of Concepción, on behalf of the judge of vacant lands of the audience of Santiago, ordered the judges of the party of Maule, to put in possession to a Mr. Jiron, of some colts located in the eastern foothills of the Andes, bordering the province of Talca.

=== Legal ===
==== 16th Century ====
Mapamundi by Abraham Ortelius (1570), where Terra Australis Incognita appears

In 1534, Emperor Charles V divided part of the South American territory into three governorships:

- New Castile for Francisco Pizarro,
- New Toledo for Diego de Almagro and Diego de Almagro and Diego de Almagro for Diego de Almagro.
- New León or Magellanic Lands for Simón de Alcazaba y Sotomayor, which was later extended to the Strait of Magellan.

In 1539, a new governorship was created to the south of Nueva León called Governorate of Terra Australis for Pedro Sánchez de la Hoz. In 1554, the conquistador Pedro de Valdivia, who was already in charge of the Governorship of Chile, got the Council of the Indies to transfer the rights of Nueva León and Terra Australis to Jerónimo de Alderete, who, after Valdivia's death the following year, took over as governor and annexed them to the territory of the kingdom of Chile.

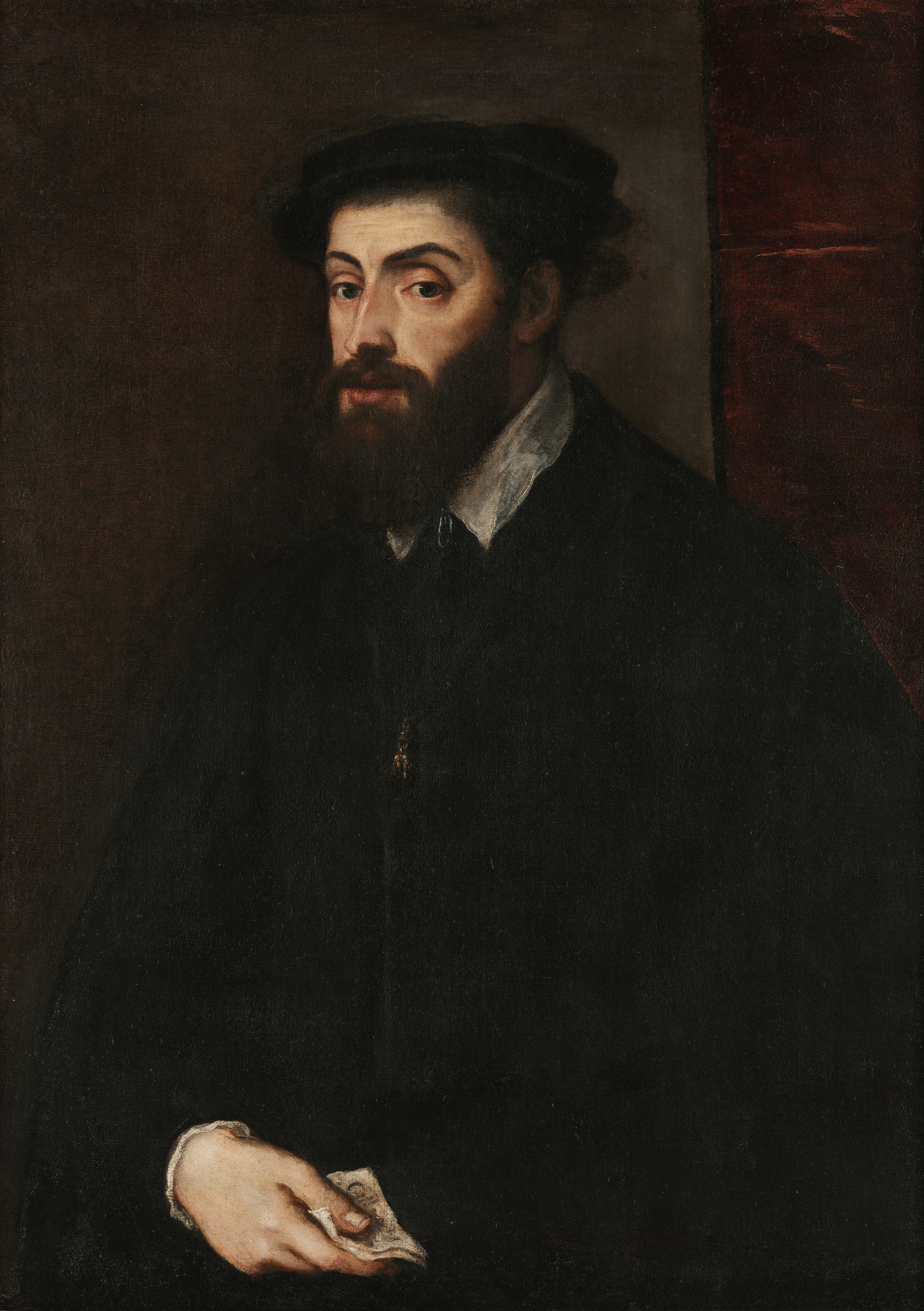
The king Charles I of Spain authorized the creation of the governorship of Terra Australis by means of a royal decree, and ratified the existence of the same by means of other subsequent ones

Jerónimo de Alderete succeeded in his task at the Court by obtaining the territories south of the strait for himself, asking for the territories immediately south of the Strait of Magellan while Valdivia's death was not yet known. Alderete's request covered "from the said Strait of Magellan along the coast of the southern sea onwards up to three hundred leagues, with all that the said strait lasts" - it is estimated that Valdivia authorized Alderete to make this request.

The monarchs granted the extension of the governorship of Valdivia to the Strait of Magellan in and Alderete's request in two royal decrees of September 29, 1554, in the one referring to the southern territory reads:

It has seemed to us to grant as we hereby grant the said Captain Geronimo de Alderete the governorship of the land that as the said strait is on the other side of the said Strait of Magellan.

After this, the Council of the Indies would draw the limits of the portion of the Terra Australis granted to Alderete, complementing by means of a capitulation the details in question. However, the news of the death of Pedro de Valdivia reached the Iberian Peninsula and with this Alderete inherited all the territory of the governorship of Terra Australis (not only the one he asked for) and on May 29, 1555, he obtained by another royal decree the provinces of Chile, its Patagonian territories, as well as incorporating the territories of Terra Australis to the kingdom of Chile. of which he was also appointed governor. In this charter he is asked to:

Take possession in our name of the lands and provinces that fall in the demarcation of the Crown of Castile, on the other side of the said strait.

At the end of 1554 King Charles I sends a letter to the Council of the Indies expressing:

and in what touches to the land that is on the other side of the said Strait of Magellan that likewise we have given and granted in governorship to the said Geronimo de Alderete we have ordered him for the reasons that have been written to you that he can from the said province of Chile send some ships to take news and relation of the quality and utility of that land because for the present he has not to pass in person nor go to conquer it nor to populate it because at present having to attend to what of Chile, could not be done one and the other together.

In the period of eight months between September 1554 and May 1555 the regions of Terra Australis requested by Alderete near the Strait of Magellan were in charge of a ruler different from that of Chile, to later be definitively incorporated to the latter once Alderete is named governor of Chile. On April 7, 1556, during his return trip, he died in Panamá of yellow fever.

The royal decree of May 29, 1555 was addressed "to the governor of Chile so that, once he arrives, he sends someone to survey the land on the other side of the Strait."

Later, in 1558, the Royal Decree issued in Brussels encouraged the Chilean kingdom to take possession of the far side of the Strait of Magellan:

As you will see in this Royal Decree, which is delivered to you with this one, you are ordered and commanded that upon your arrival in that land, you send some ships to gather information and report on the land on the other side of the Strait; take care to look into this and inform us of the news brought by the people you send.

At that time, it was believed that Tierra del Fuego was part of the Terra Australis. Thus, both sides of the Strait of Magellan were legally considered to be part of the Kingdom of Chile.

The royal decree of 1563, issued on August 29 by King Philip II separated the Governorate of Tucumán from the Governorate of Chile and transferred it to the Audience of Charcas, stating that "we have agreed to set aside the said governorate of Tucumán, Juríes and Diaguitas from the said governorate of Chile and include them in the district of the said audience of Las Charcas". With the birth of the Audiencia of Buenos Aires in 1663, the territory of Tucumán would be transferred to its jurisdiction.

Community of jurisdictions of the Governorate of La Plata and the Captaincy General of Chile between 1570 and 1661 according to Manuel Ravest Mora.

On June 1, 1570, King Philip II, by means of a royal decree, granted Juan Ortiz de Zárate an expansion of the Governorate of the Río de la Plata, extending it to the Strait of Magellan. There was also an overlap between the degree 48° 05' S to the north, the Strait to the south, the Atlantic to the east and the Pacific to the west with the governorate of Chile, this was due to the lack of an explicit act in the royal decree that modified the limits of the governorate of Chile, and the lack of geographical knowledge of the time.

However, in 1661, the territory was reintegrated to the jurisdiction of the kingdom of Chile, as it had been since the foundation of the kingdom.

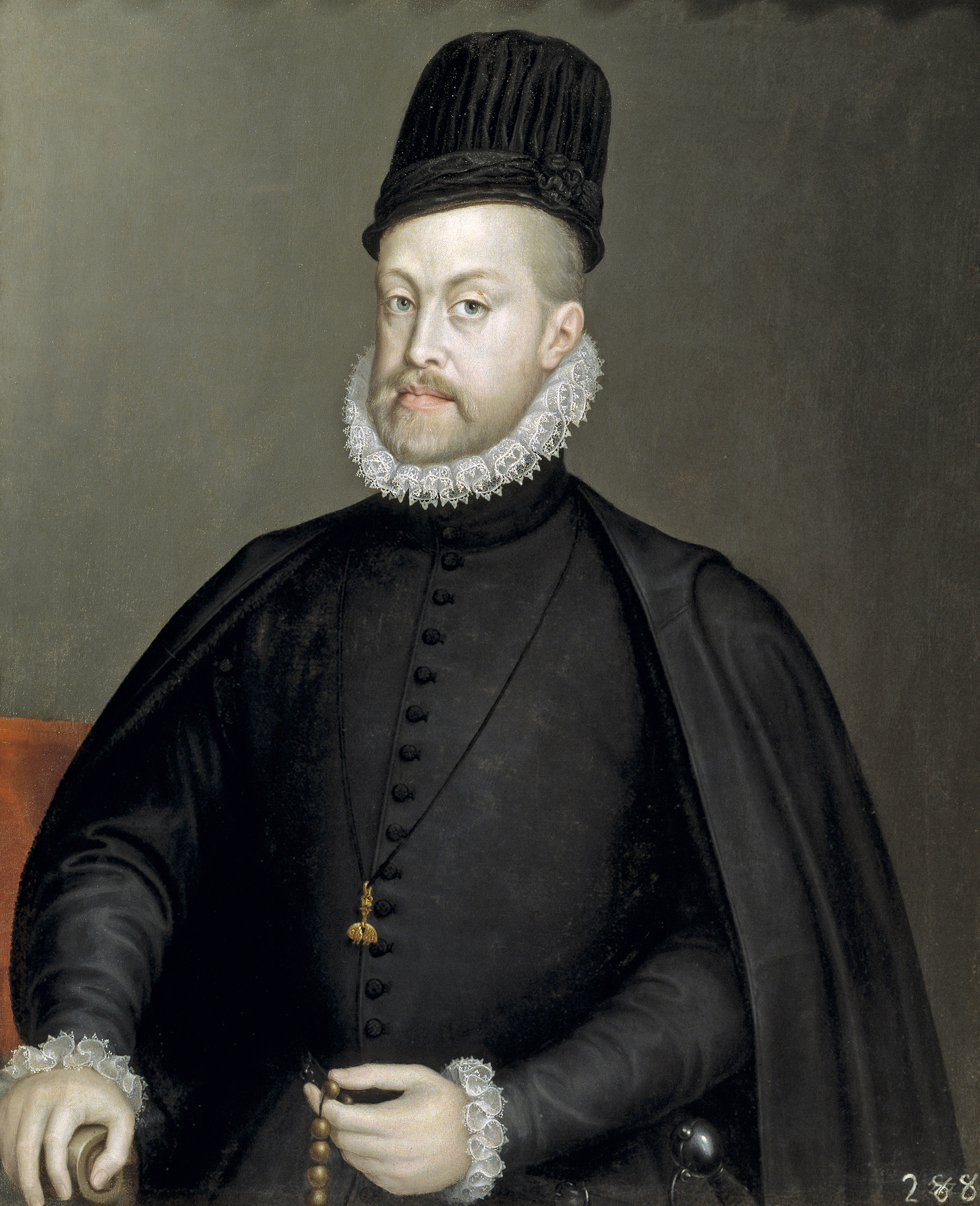
King Philip II

In 1573 King Philip II dissolved the Real Audiencia of Concepción, restoring Rodrigo de Quiroga as governor of Chile by means of the Real Cédula de San Lorenzo el Real of August 5 in this cédula he speaks about the territory in the following terms:

...you shall have the Government and Captaincy General of the said provinces of Chile according to and in the manner that Don García Hurtado de Mendoza and the adelantado Francisco de Villagra and the other governors that have been governors of the said provinces had it [....] we have the good will to enlarge and extend the said Governorate of Chile from the way Pedro de Valdivia had it for another one hundred and seventy leagues, more or less, which are from the confines of the Governorate that Pedro de Valdivia had until the Strait of Magellan

According to the Chilean historian Oscar Pinochet, the territory that had been assigned to Villagra and was inherited by Quiroga included the Strait of Magellan, "inclusive", as well as the territories to the south of it. In this regard, the Argentine jurist Pablo Lacoste argues that in the appointment of Rodrigo de Quiroga in 1573 the jurisdiction of 100 leagues in width was not explicitly reiterated, as it had appeared verbatim in the capitulations of 1554, 1555 and 1558, and that this omission can be explained by the territorial detachments ordered by the Spanish Crown, namely the separation of Tucumán in 1563 and the expansion of the Governorate of the Río de la Plata over Patagonia in 1570. The aforementioned Argentine jurist states that when the king indicated that Quiroga was to perform his duties as governor in the same manner as his predecessors, he was not referring to the jurisdictional aspect, because otherwise the royal decree of 1573 would have had evident effects. That is, the Governorate of Tucumán should have returned to the jurisdiction of the Governorate of Chile, but this did not occur.

In response, the Chilean historian Manuel Ravest Mora maintains that the royal decree of 1573 is the last occasion on which the king mentions the territorial boundaries of the governorate, noting that these were left unmodified with respect to other governorates, such as Tucumán, and the overlap near the strait. Ravest explains this overlap by stating that «the Councilors must have believed that the eastern boundary of Chile — resulting from its 100 leagues in width — reached the Strait, and that, for that very reason, the intermediate vertical strip between the Captaincy General and the Northern Sea, up to the Strait, was left vacant, where they located the Patagonian Province of Rasquin, later granted to Ortiz». The historian disagrees that the «eastern boundary of Chile» had been eliminated, and cites a 1744 document from the royal officials of Santiago, who described the territory of the governorate as follows: «it includes the entire Pampa up to the Northern Sea, ending at the Bay without Bottom or near the River of the Lions at 44° latitude», which coincides with the calculation of the 100 leagues, although this measure ceased to be explicitly mentioned.

==== 17th Century ====
When the Real Audiencia of Santiago de Chile was established on February 17, 1609, the Royal Decree that ordered its creation by King Philip III included the entire territory of the provinces of Chile as part of its jurisdiction, thus the territory of the audiencia and governance are explicitly equated in the case of Chile, stating:

We want, he says, and it is our will, that the said Audiencia have in its district all the cities, towns and places and lands that are included in the Government of the said provinces of Chile, both what is now peaceful and populated, as well as what henceforth is reduced, pacified and populated

— The King, February 17, 1609 in Madrid

.

On November 1, 1661, King Philip IV issued a Royal Decree that restored the boundaries of Chile stipulating:

all the Kingdom already named of Chile, with the cities, towns, places and territories that are included in the government of these provinces, both the regions that are today pacified and populated and those that could be conquered, populated and pacified in the interior and exterior of the Strait of Magellan and in the interior territory including up to the province of Cuyo.

In 1680 King Charles II ordered the promulgation of the Compilation of the Laws of the Kingdoms of the Indies, Created to harmonize and organize the laws of the Monarchy, in which Law 12 reaffirmed that the Audiencia de Chile should have:

[....] which has as its district all the said Reyno de Chile, with the cities, towns, villages, places and lands included in the government of those provinces, as well as what is now pacified and populated, as well as what will be reduced, populated and pacified within and outside the Strait of Magellan and the land inside up to and including the province of Cuyo

— Compilation of Laws of the Indies, 1680

The royal decree of 1680 states that any law different from or contrary to the laws of the Recopilación holds no legal value. However, it is the royal decree of November 1, 1681, that authorized the publication of the Compilation.

The Spanish explorers hardly traveled through the Aysén channels and those who did, tried to find the way to the mythical City of the Caesars unsuccessfully.

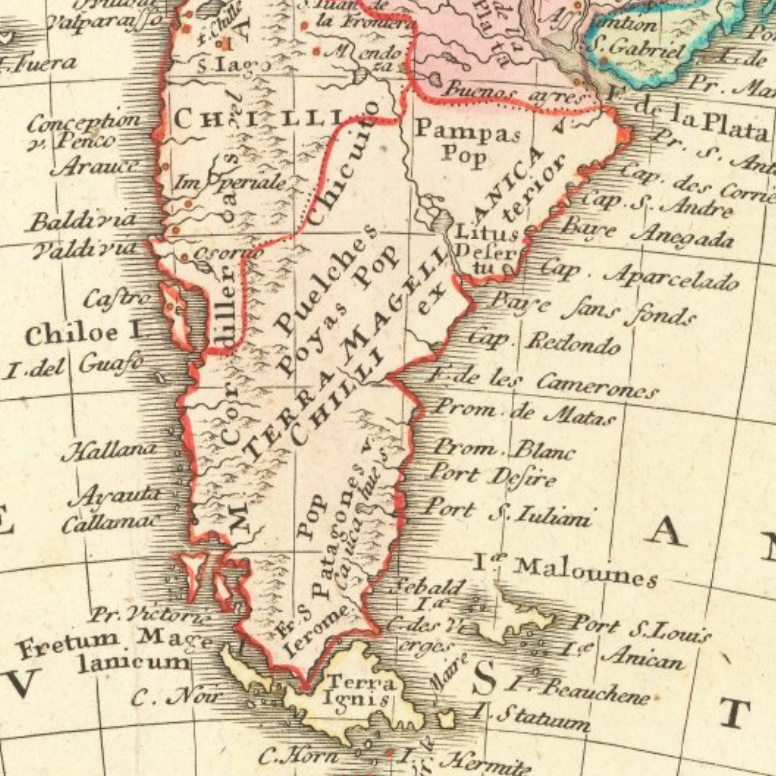
Map of 1746 showing Patagonia

The region of Trapananda (present-day Aysén) was incorporated to the domains of Chiloé being the geographical area located between the middle of the Chiloé archipelago and the Strait of Magellan, the final objective to be fortified for the Spanish empire. These domains covered as far as Cape Horn.

Between 1557 and 1679, twelve religious expeditions were made to explore the region.

In the old charts the Patagonian region, between parallels 48° and 50° South, appeared to be occupied almost exclusively by a large island called "Campana" separated from the mainland by the "Calén Nation Channel", nation that was supposed to have existed until the 16th century between parallels 48° and 49° south latitude.

==== 18th Century ====
The year 1741 occurs the shipwreck of the British ship HMS Wager in the area of the Guayaneco Archipelago. Following the event Spain increased its interest in the region, increasing expeditions to the Isthmus of Ofqui and sending Franciscan and Jesuit missionaries who transferred canoeists.

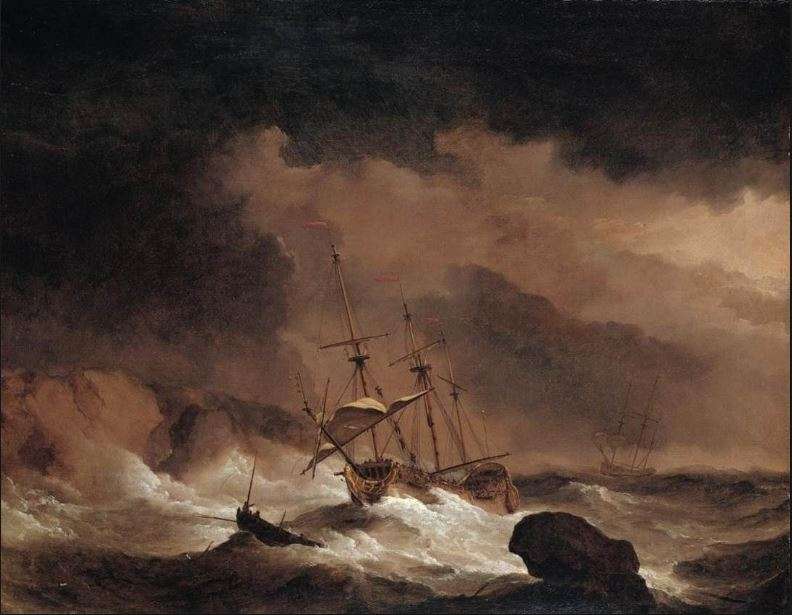
In 1741 the British ship HMS Wager sank off the west coast of Patagonia, present-day Aysén, setting off alarms in Spain about possible foreign incursions into Patagonia

Between the years 1762 and 1767 as well as 1798 the Jesuit J. Vicuña visited the region. Juan Levien received a title deed between parallels 43° and 48° south latitude after his assistance to José de Moraleda.

In 1749 the rey Ferdinand VI of Spain ordered the construction of Fort San Fernando de Tenquehuén on the Taitao Peninsula, later dismantled. Previously the English admiral George Anson had promoted the creation of a settlement of his country on Inche Island.

In 1792 an expedition under the command of Francisco de Clemente y Miró together with Luis Lasqueti to Inche Island in the Chonos Archipelago.

In 1744 the Royal Officer of Santiago following orders from the Council of the Indies made a description of the kingdom that detailed the Magellanic Lands or Outer Chile within its jurisdiction:

It graduates and counts all this Kingdom of Chile at the present time from Cape Horn that is in the height of 56° to the Hill of San Benito in the height of 24° South to North " in which is the uninhabited place that they call of Peru [...].It includes all the Pampa until the North Sea ending in the Bahía sin Fondo or next to the Río de los Leones at 44° of latitude, and declining from this point to the Strait of Magellan until Cape Horn by the beach of the map that includes this relation until 56° of latitude in which it is included, according to it and the account that has been made (1390) one thousand three hundred and ninety leagues of circumference throughout the Reyno, which are the most punctual demarcations, signs and the most certain boundaries that we have been able to acquire, by practical persons who live there and the faith in whose knowledge are its inhabitants by reason of the demarcation of the Reyno, Provinces and their lands with whom they share.

— Royal Officer of Santiago, 1744

The limit described corresponds exactly with the extension of one hundred leagues of east–west width that was given to the governorship of Nueva Extremadura and provinces of Chile in the 16th century. With calculations made with data provided by geographers and pilots of the time of the conquest, it gives that the Spanish legua is more than 6 km today. With the calculation of the hundred leagues from the coast of the Pacific Ocean gives that approximately the limit reaches the 65th meridian west, in the gulf of San Matías, current port of San Antonio Oeste.

In 1748, a book published after an expedition requested by the king to America details:

Occupies the dilated Kingdom of Chile that part of southern America which from the ends of Peru runs towards the southern pole to the Strait of Magellan... making a division between both kingdoms, as is said elsewhere, the uninhabited Atacama....

— Relación Histórica del viaje a la América Meridional hecho de orden de Su Majestad, 1748, Jorge Juan y Antonio de Ulloa

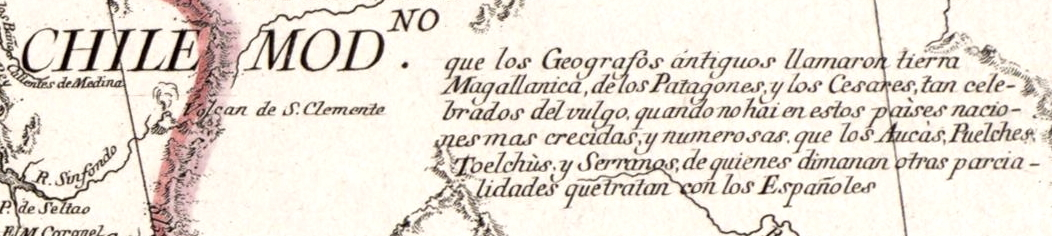
Excerpt from the 1775 Cano y Olmedilla map, an official document of the Spanish Empire, which specifies that the name "Chile Moderno" refers to Patagonia

On April 26, 1761, the Viceroy of Peru and former Governor of Chile, Manuel de Amat y Juinent, sent to the Council of the Indies and the Court a report called Historia geográfica e hidrográfica del Reino de Chile which included Modern Chile (Patagonia) with an explicit description of the Atlantic coast as part of its jurisdiction, as well as a ten-page map of the entire southern tip of the continent, including the Strait of Magellan, Tierra del Fuego and the Falkland Islands. These documents were approved by the Council of the Indies, and there is a thank-you note dated November 16, 1761.

San Matías Bay; Cabo de Matas; source of the San Jorge River, which flows in the eastern part of the Sierra Nevada; Cabo San Jorge, on the eastern coast; Cabo Blanco, on the eastern coast; source of the Deseado River, which flows to the east; Bahía Deseada; Cabo San Julián, on the eastern coast; Bahía San Julián; Santa Cruz River mouth; Sebald Islands discovered by Sebaldo de Weert in 1699; Gallegos River mouth; Bocas del Estrecho; Puerto del Hambre; Bahía del Buen Suceso; Cabo de las Vírgenes; Cabo del Espíritu Santo; Cabo de San Sebastián; Bahía de la Posesión; Estrecho Le Maire; Tierra del Fuego; Cabo de Hornos.

— Geographic and Hydrographic History of the Kingdom of Chile, 1761

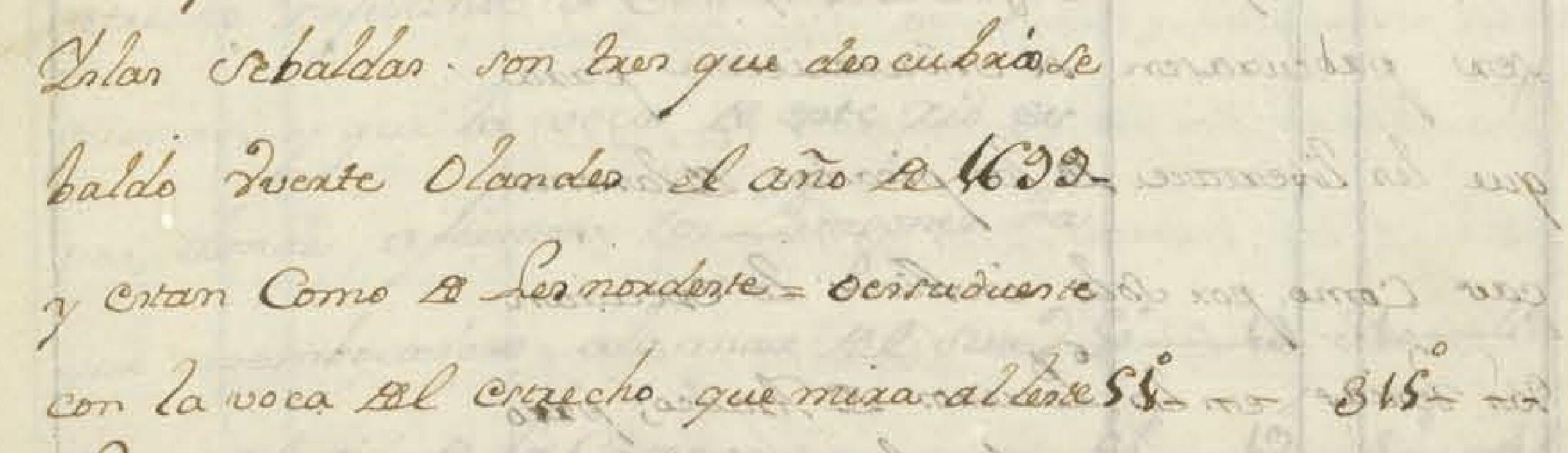
The islas Sebaldas islands in the South Atlantic Ocean were included in the book Historia geográfica e hidrográfica, con derrotero general correlativo al plan del Reino de Chile by the viceroy of Peru Manuel de Amat y Junyent.

On October 4, 1766, the king declared:

from now on I declare the Government of the Malvinas dependent on that Captaincy General over the correspondence and further Providences that it may be convenient to establish.

From that moment in 1766 and no other, the Malvinas Islands that Spain considered a Patagonian possession would be subject to Buenos Aires, ceasing to depend on the Captaincy General of Chile. On September 29 of the following year, the King forwarded to the Governor of Chile, Antonio de Guill y Gonzaga, the news about the islands that were made to reach Ruiz Puente.

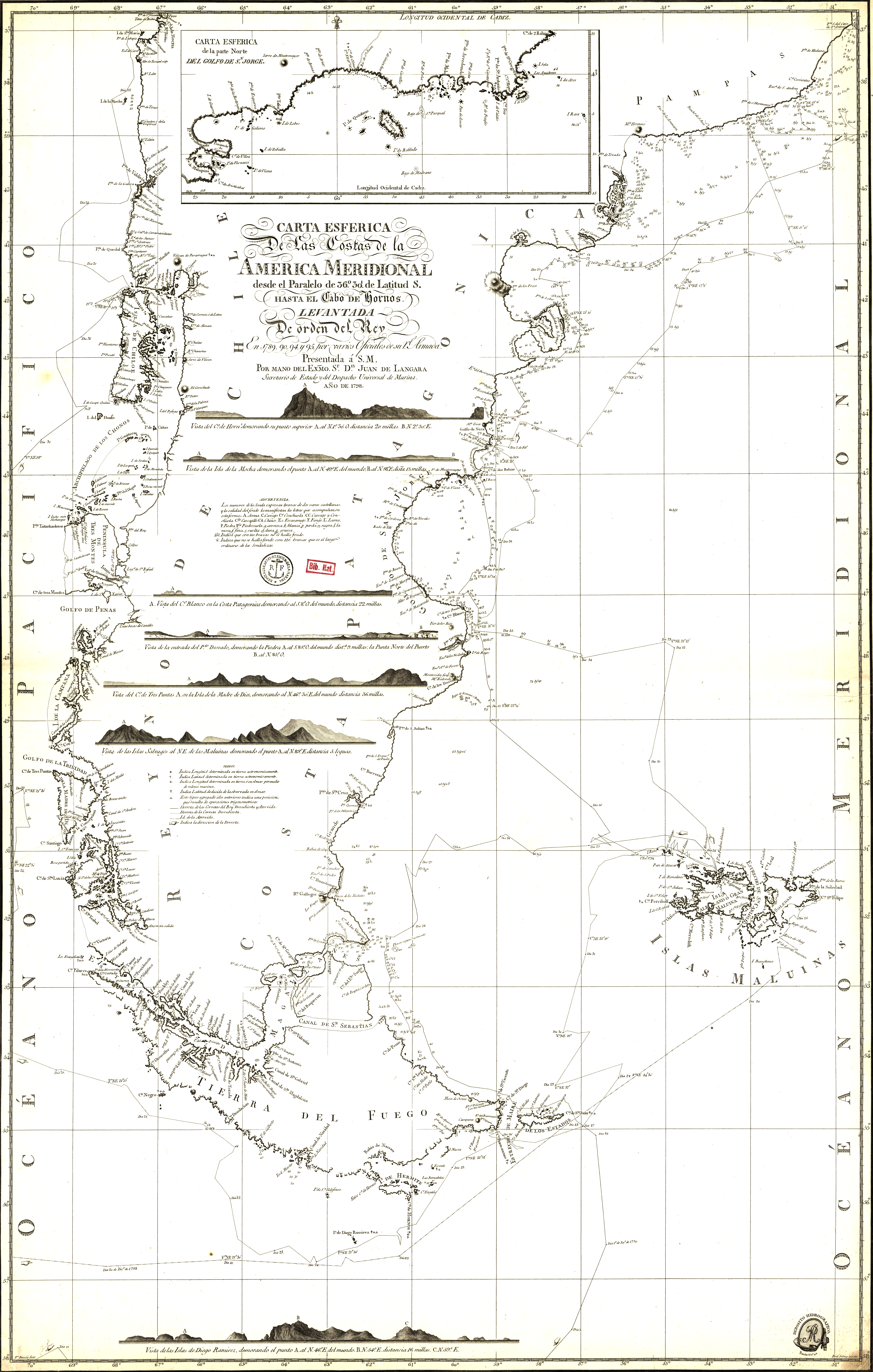
Spherical chart of the coasts of South America made by Juan de Lángara in 1798 including the Patagonian coasts and the settlements in this besides the name reyno de Chile

The royal decrees spoke of the administration of the province of Nahuelhuapi by the kingdom of Chile.

confirm the mission named Nuestra Señora de la Asunción de indios puelches y poyas in the Nahuelhuapi Province of the Kingdom of Chile

— Real cédula del 23 de febrero de 1713

The projects of segregation of the corregimiento of Cuyo were fought by the Cabildo of Santiago since at least 1765. In 1775 a memorial written by Manuel de Salas was sent to the king in which the entities of Chile and Cuyo were declared indissoluble and that if the inclusion of the Cuyo Province to the Viceroyalty of the Río de la Plata was successful, the whole Kingdom of Chile was also asked to be incorporated to it. After the royal decree of October 27, 1777, the Viceroyalty of the Río de la Plata was declared constituted and under its jurisdiction:

[...] the territories of the cities of Mendoza and San Juan that were in charge of the governorship of Chile

The southern boundary of the territories transferred to the new viceroyalty is the Diamante River, according to the founding act of the city of Mendoza and with the map of Juan de la Cruz Cano y Olmedilla of 1775, which was used by the king to create the new viceroyalty. The map shows the term "Modern Chile" in Patagonia, as well as the name "Kingdom of Chile" even in the eastern part of the Andes. The Deserted Region of Patagonia or Modern Chile bordered the domains of Buenos Aires at Cape Corrientes, a little north of the present city of Mar del Plata. On April 7, 1776, by means of a royal order, the king ordered that Cano y Olmedilla be given a monetary bonus "in recognition of the diligence and skill with which he had composed and engraved the Map of South America". On February 23, 1802, a Royal Order authorized the distribution of copies of the map in the ministries and the Council of the Indies.

At the request of the viceroy of Peru Manuel de Amat y Junyent, King Charles III of Spain issued a royal order on August 20, 1767, by which he transferred the government of Chiloé to the direct jurisdiction of the viceroy of Peru on a provisional basis so that the construction of defenses could be facilitated. On March 28, 1768, the viceroy appointed Captain of Dragoons Carlos de Beranger as military governor to replace Manuel Fernández de Castelblanco. In the same provision, he provisionally separated Chiloé from the jurisdiction of the captain general of Chile and the Real Audiencia of Santiago:

(...) to separate, at least for now, and with dependence of the approval of S. M., the temporary jurisdiction of that island and its adjacencies from the general captaincy of Chile and the royal audience of Santiago; and to subject them to the latter from where with more promptness and ease military and political aid can be administered by means of frequent navigation, as from this capital the resources of the situado i sinodo (...) As viceroy and general captain of the kingdoms of Peru and Chile, I command in the name of S. M. that the aforementioned province, its castles, islands, islands, castles, castles, islands, castles, islands, and the royal audience of Santiago, and to subject them to the latter from where with more promptness and ease military and political aid can be administered by means of frequent navigation. that the aforementioned province, its castles, islands, squares and fortresses, for now and while the operations that are going to be undertaken for their fortification, better service of the king and benefit of said natives last, remain subject to this general captaincy and in the political to this royal audience, where they can interpose the resources that the laws allow.

Charles III approved the provision of the viceroy through the royal order of October 15, 1768, with Chiloé remaining under the jurisdiction of the bishopric of Concepción.

On October 1, 1788, the king issued another royal order returning Chiloé to the dependency of the government of Chile, but the order was never carried out by the viceroy of Peru, which was among his attributions since any royal order could not be executed until receiving the cúmplase from the viceroy.

By royal decree of May 19, 1784, Chiloé was transformed into a intendancy and Francisco Hurtado del Pino was appointed governor intendant. However, due to various problems during Hurtado's administration, in 1789 the king reverted Chiloé to its status of political and military government, thus abolishing the intendancy.

However, all official maps of the crown continued to show Chiloé and its district within Chile. The intendancy depended in religious matters on the bishopric of Concepción, while in military matters it had to commensurate its decisions with the commander of the Chilean Frontiers. Hurtado describes the limits of the new administrative entity:

[...] to the north is the Río Bueno, to the south Cape Horn, to the east the Andes Mountains and all the mainland and islands between these three directions, adjacent to the coast.

In 1787, the viceroy of Peru Teodoro de Croix detailed in his report the extent of the Viceroyalty of the Río de la Plata, stating:

From Buenos Aires to Juijui, which is 407 leagues, to the South it borders on the Magellanic Lands, to the North with the Amazon River and to the East with Brazil

In 1787, the Intendencia de Santiago and the Intendencia de Concepción were created. The former had the Atacama Desert as its northern legal border; the latter extended to the Biobío River, plus some nearby territories, but on its left bank. According to what was communicated by the Spanish brigadier Ambrosio de Benavides Medina -appointed by King Charles III of Spain as governor of the Kingdom of Chile- and the regent Tomas Antonio Álvarez de Acevedo y Robles:

[...] the general captaincy of Chile was to be divided into only two intendancies, that of Santiago which would extend from the southern confines of the viceroyalty of Peru to the banks of the Maule River; and that of Concepción which would begin at this river and end at the last forts of the Araucanian frontier.

The 3rd foundation of Osorno, authorized to Ambrosio O'Higgins by Royal Order of December 7, 1793, partially reduced the Government of Chiloé to the benefit of the Intendancy of Concepción. Its territorial limits, according to O'Higgins himself, were:

[...] on the south the Maypue River, where the province of Chiloé ends, on the north the Pilmaiquén River, on the west the coast between Río Bueno and Maypué, and on the east the great mountain range.

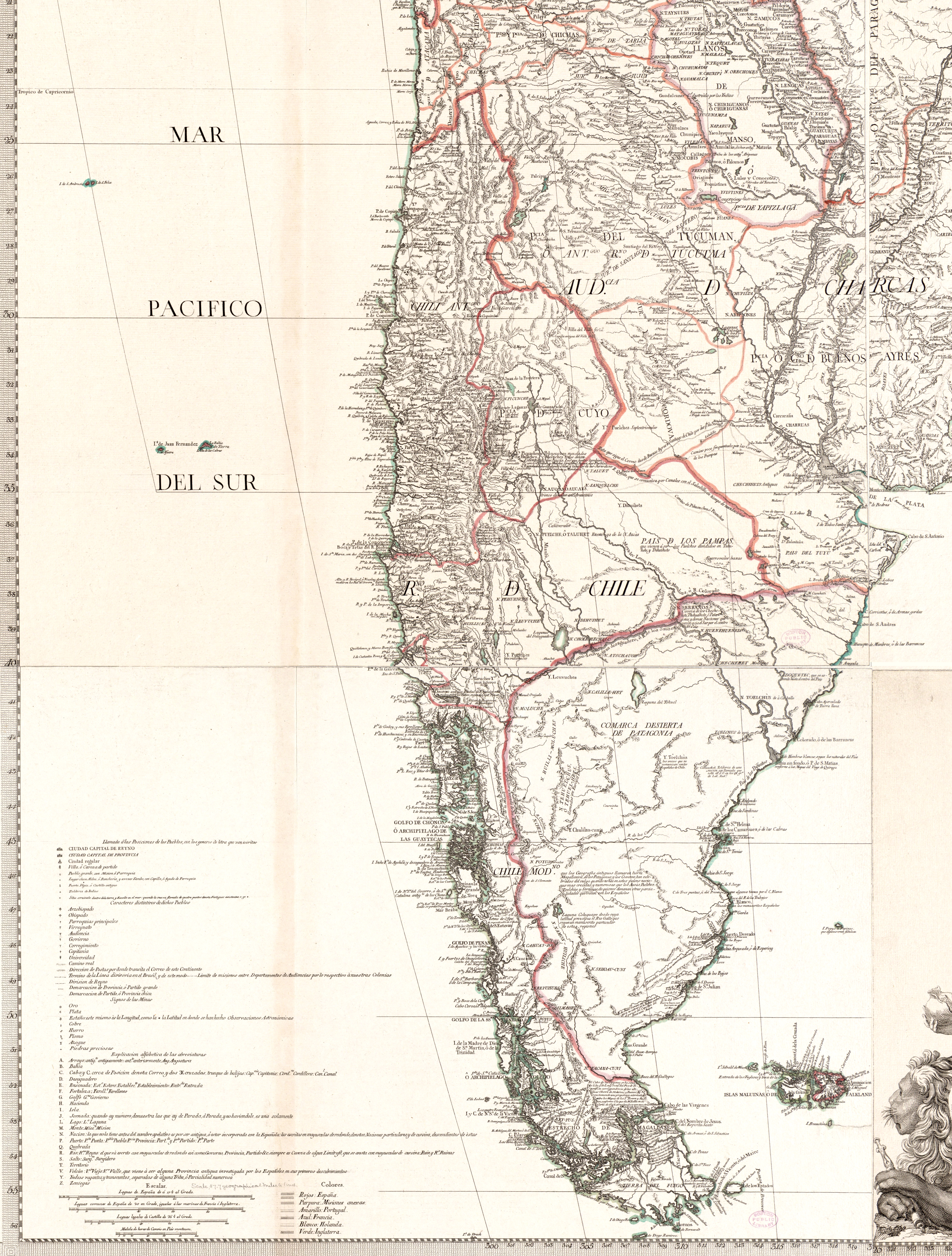
Kingdom of Chile according to Juan de la Cruz Cano y Olmedilla, 1775. The area of the kingdom that was already settled in that year is called "Old Chile" and those yet to be settled, which included the whole of Patagonia, were called "Modern Chile".

On February 23, 1802, by Royal Order, copies of Cano y Olmedilla's map were distributed to the ministries and the Council of the Indies. This map shows Patagonia within the Kingdom of Chile, noting there: "Modern Chile that the ancient geographers called Magellanic Land, of the Patagones and the Caesars, so celebrated by the vulgar as there are no nations in these countries more numerous and numerous than the Aucas, Puelches, Toelches and Serranos from whom other partialities that deal with the Spaniards originate". The Madrid government in 1802 authorized the sale of the map to the public.

On December 20, 1783, the parliament in Lonquilmo was held, presided over by Ambrosio O'Higgins on behalf of Ambrosio de Benavides Medina. In this assembly, the indigenous peoples of the eastern Andes were incorporated into the four butalmapu, thus securing their loyalty to the monarch and ensuring the surveillance of the Magellanic Lands through the governors-general of Chile and the commander-in-chief of the Araucanian frontier army.

The agreement states:

5. ° That they are also included in this same butalmapu the puelches and pampas Indians that possess the countries of the northern part of the kingdom from Malalguí and borders of Mendoza until the Mamilmapu located in the pampas of Buenos Aires, those that forming a body and partiality with our puelches and pehuenches of Maulé, Chillán and Antuco will be intimidated in the name of the King Our Lord to submit in common with the other Indians to the present terms of the general peace, assured of the royal protection as long as they desist from the pernicious raids and hostilities executed continuously with the Spaniards of the jurisdiction of Buenos Aires (...) 18. ...) 18.° That they have to confess and recognize as their King and Natural Lord our Catholic monarch Charles III, may God keep him; that they have to be faithful and obey without ever failing in any thing to the orders that on behalf of S. M. were communicated to them by the general captains and general commander of the frontier.... Likewise they are charged on behalf of S. M. to the faithful caciques of the expressed butalmapu and the Indians of the common class, if there is at present towards the Magellanic Lands any colony or establishment of strange people and that they give an account of what they know for the intelligence of the general captaincy of Chile.

The agreement was presented to the king, who approved it by royal order on November 16, 1784. More such parliaments were held by order of Governor Luis Muñoz de Guzmán until 1803.

In 1783 Manuel José de Orejuela y Aguilar mentions his explorations of the Patagonian coast in his report titled "Report and records on the discovery of foreigners and Caesars in the highlands of the kingdom of Chile" in which he states:

to discover if in the heights of this Kingdom that are measured from 40 degrees to the Strait of Magallanes and Cape Horn, there is any or some Spanish populations or colonies of foreigners, as has been announced to us by long-standing tradition […] the Powerful invincible Monarch who happily governs us was pleased to issue the royal order of December 29, 1778 in which, as a consequence of the proceedings promoted by the distinguished and ardent zeal of Colonel don Joaquín de Espinoza, he was pleased to adopt the timely and well-founded reflection that this Captaincy General (of Chile) made to him in support of the proposal that Colonel don Joaquín explained in his letter […] leaving to the direction of this superior government the arrangement of the expeditions that are to be carried out with the very important object of discovering such establishments and once and for all resolving doubts […] with the understanding that the Lord Captain General of this Kingdom shall deal directly with the Most Excellent Lord Viceroy of Peru for whatever may arise regarding this matter, for which purpose His Majesty has warned him to provide the troops and other aid he deems convenient for the achievement of this enterprise […] Last year 1783 don Basilio de Villarino, Chief Pilot of the Royal Navy, sailed by order of His Majesty the aforementioned Río Negro, with the same object of discovering the English on its shores. His expedition began at the mouth of said river as well as the Patagonian Coasts, and crossing through the entire heart of the Kingdom

The historian Isidoro Vázquez de Acuña argues that the territory of the settlements on the Atlantic Patagonian coast were under the jurisdiction of Chiloé, reintegrated de iure to the Captaincy General of Chile in 1788. On August 13, 1793 Ambrosio O'Higgins sends an official letter to the Viceroy of Peru in which he states:

the diligence will always be very important, and will provide the reconnaissance of the heart of those lands, their products, inhabitants and communications, how to introduce those of our possessions on this side of Chiloé with those established or that may be established in Puerto Deseado, San Julián, and Bahía Sin Fondo, points that Your Excellency knows very well and knows it is convenient for us to occupy for the security of these domains and to prevent harmful attempts by foreigners.

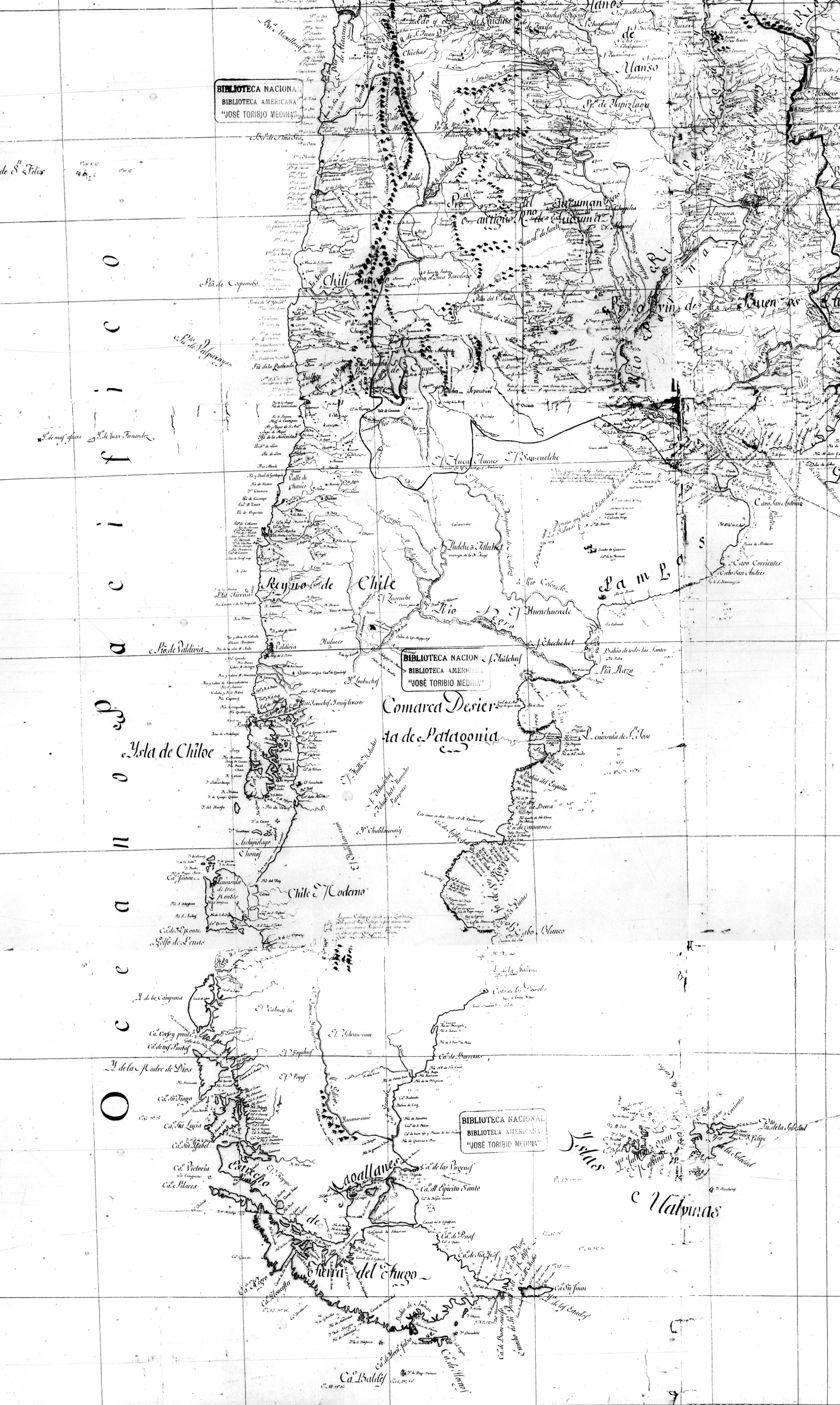
The Kingdom of Chile in the map by Agustín Ibáñez y Bojons from 1800. A border similar to that in the Cano y Olmedilla map of 1775 can be seen on the Atlantic coast, near the 36th parallel south.

In 1800, Spanish Army Lieutenant Colonel and First Captain of the Corps of Engineers, Agustín Ibáñez y Bojons, created a map of South America showing boundaries similar to those of the 1775 map by Cano and Olmedilla, with the difference that the Atlantic boundary of the Kingdom of Chile approaches the 36th parallel south instead of the 38th. Additionally, in its description reproduced in the 1942 book *Monumenta Chartographica Indiana*, written by Julio Guillén Tato for the Ministry of Foreign Affairs (Spain), it is noted that the map includes the "boundaries of the Viceroyalty of Buenos Aires", and that the map itself features the label "Fronteras de Buenos Ayres":

In the SE, a circular cartouche with explanation, key, and notes. [...] as agreed for the best performance of sea and land recognitions carried out by the mapmaker in 1800 by order of the authorities. It is a copy. It contains the boundaries of the Viceroyalty of Buenos Aires, from which it surely originates, and a legend in one place over those of Spain and Portugal, such as: "From the Port of Maldonado to the Río Grande de San Pedro was surveyed by the geographers of the demarcation of borders between the two Crowns of Spain and Portugal, which began at the Arroyo de Chuy in 1780." It spans from the Equator to 57°S and from 23°30′E to 24°30′W from Buenos Aires. The Royal Geographical Society of Madrid also possessed another map, likely the original, signed by Ibáñez and identical in size and all aspects. This Society also held the Millau map of South America (17..), cited by Fernández Duro in Disquisiciones Naut., which largely served Cruz Cano in creating his own map described above.

The map was sent to State Secretary José de Urruña by Martínez de Cáceres in 1802, and Ibáñez himself sent it to the Spanish Government in 1804 with an operations plan to recover territories occupied by the Portuguese.

==== 19th Century ====
In the Archivo General de Indias is preserved a manuscript of the first delineator of the Hydrographic Repository of the Crown of Spain, the naval lieutenant Andrés Baleato. Created by a royal charter, it ends with three notes, in the second of which he enunciates:

On the northern coast of the Strait of Magellan is the Morro de Santa Águeda or Cape Froward, from which the Andes Mountain Range runs northward and divides the Patagonian land into eastern and western. The eastern part was always considered to belong to the Viceroyalty of Buenos Aires up to the Strait of Magellan, although it did not have more establishments than up to the Río Negro and the Guardia de la Bahía de San José. Western Patagonia belonged to the Kingdom of Chile up to the Strait of Magellan, although the conversions of Indians did not go beyond the southernmost part of the Chiloe Archipelago, with a few entries made by missionaries in the Guaytecas or Chonos Archipelago. The Tierra del Fuego had no establishments or conversions belonging to Buenos Aires or Chile and its separation from the continent by the Strait of Magellan made its belonging imaginary.

— Andrés Baleato, Descripción geográfica del Virreinato del Río de la Plata (1803).

Baleato does not clarify where both Patagonian regions would be divided, according to the historian Isidoro Vázquez de Acuña, he only spoke of religious missions and military establishments, not of administrative boundaries, confusing the surveillance of the coast with territorial dominion and recognizing that Buenos Aires only had presence up to the Río Negro and the bay of San José.

By order of the intendant of Concepción, the provincial mayor Luis de la Cruz undertook in 1806 the exploration of the road of the Chileans to the Atlantic. The intendant authorized it saying "how it could be extended to our establishments on the coast of Patagonia". Cruz was accompanied by a group of officers of the royal army of Chile and a short distance from Buenos Aires, he told the cacique aucae Curripilún: "You were always poor until the Spaniards came to these Chilean deserts to breed horses, cows and sheep for your sustenance". And in a memorial presented to the Court of the Consulate of Santiago in 1807, the explorer said: "The Consulate will find that this kingdom is united with that of Buenos Aires, leaving in our favor as much land as the kingdom of Chile can enjoy in all its extension. You will find that the land qualities are excellent for extending our cattle ranches, and that our commerce extends to Europe. You will find safe ways to defend us by the pathogenic coasts of our friends (the Indians) for defense, without multiplying expenses to the treasury and by means of them extend our discoveries and conquests to the most remote places".

== Disputed territory ==
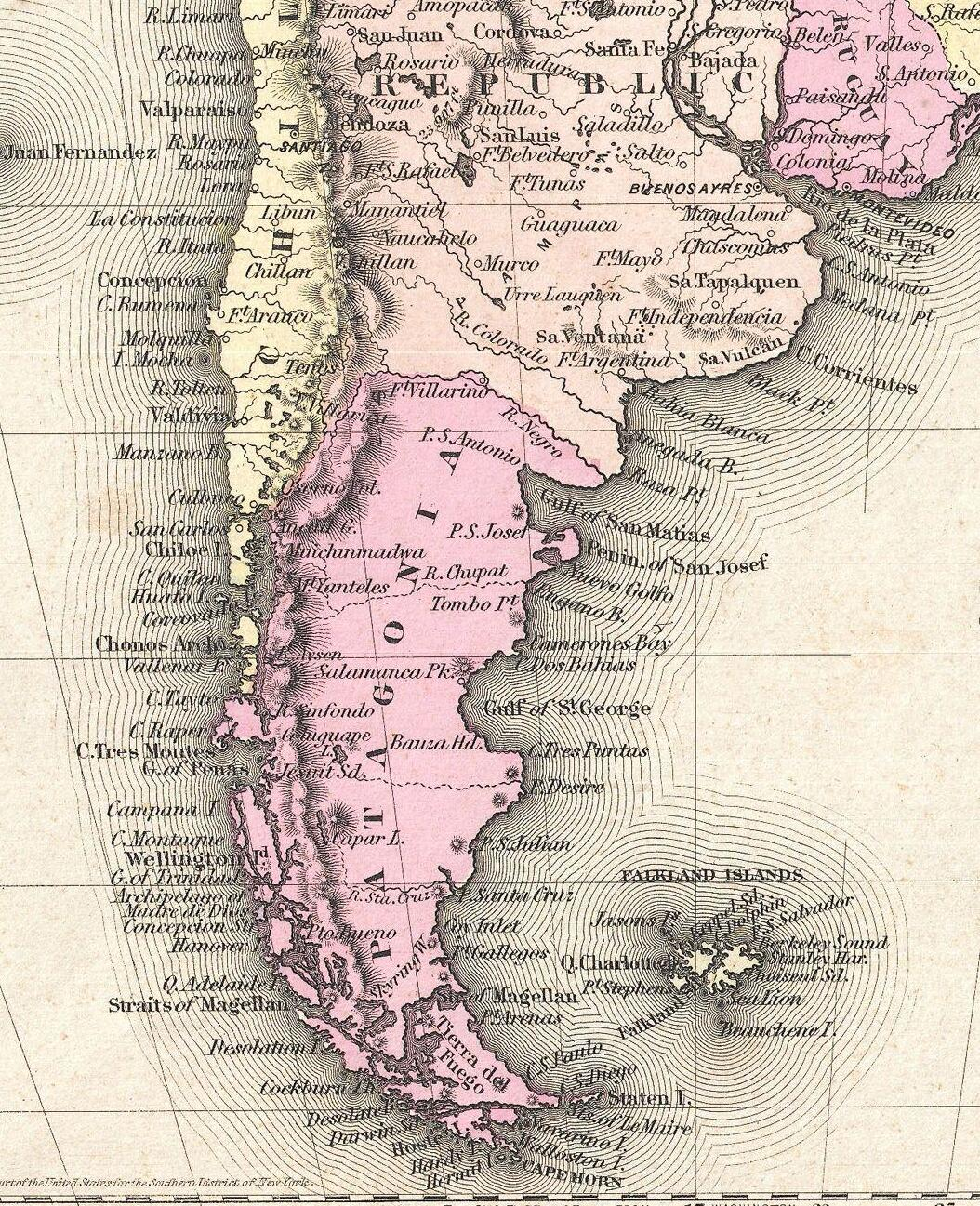
English map of Patagonia (East and West) in a different color from that of Chile and Argentina. The western side of the region was not disputed by both countries

The official maps of the Crown, and royal decrees mention the Patagonian region. The map of Juan de la Cruz Cano y Olmedilla of 1775, the Jesuit missions of the Archbishopric of Santiago that tried at the end of the 16th century to evangelize the Indians of Nahuel Huapi, and the settlements on the Atlantic coast are antecedents of the presence of Spain in the region. Thus, Patagonia, was even more extensive than the region that currently bears that name, encompassing almost all of Argentina's current maritime coastline and the Central Dry Pampa that it does not currently encompass.

It started much further north than the Colorado River, covering the south of the current Province of Mendoza, Buenos Aires, as well as the whole of La Pampa, San Luis, and even parts of the west of Córdoba.

Its limit was in the rivers Diamante River, Quinto River, and in the river Hueuque, and when being separated these three rivers by extensive territories, it also used three imaginary lines by fields, or natural by mountains (a line that passed over the Desaguadero River, another that went down by the chained lagoons of the west of Buenos Aires, and another by the mountains of Buenos Aires to the sea) that joined these points according to the official document of Cano y Olmedilla of 1775.

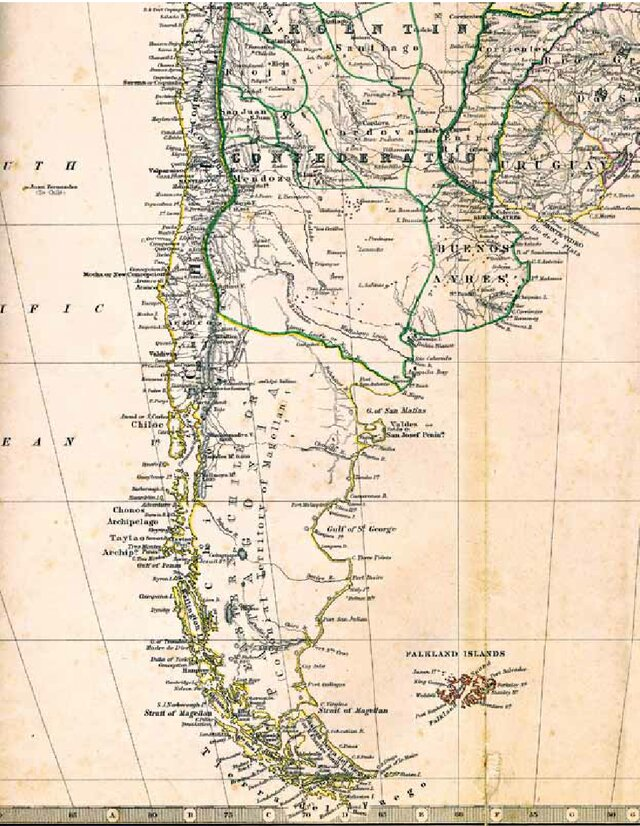
English map of 1861 showing the boundary between Chile and Argentina at the Rio Negro

In 1810, the date agreed upon by the nascent Spanish-American republics to apply the principle of uti possidetis juris, Patagonia was largely unoccupied by the Spanish Empire, which held meetings with indigenous chieftains, such as those organized by Ambrosio O'Higgins.

The Patagonian region had the presence of Spanish forts on its Atlantic coast and belonged de jure to the empire thanks to the Treaty of Tordesillas of 1494, so both Chile and Argentina rejected from the beginning that the territory had been res nullius, besides the latter concept would have benefited foreign powers such as Great Britain, which organized the expeditions where Charles Darwin was present, or France which had some interest in the Strait of Magellan.

The concept of uti possidetis juris was reaffirmed by Argentina and Chile in the Treaty of 1856, which ambiguously consigned the respect of the colonial borders between the signatory parties. The Eastern Patagonia dispute is based on the disagreement over the inherited boundary of the Spanish empire between Chile and the former Viceroyalty of the Río de la Plata.

The dispute between the two states over the Patagonian territories east of the Andes begins from 1843 onwards, after the foundation of Fort Bulnes by Chile, often including much of the shore of the Strait of Magellan to varying extents in turn as Tierra del Fuego. Only one year earlier there was an incident in the mountainous area of Talca.

== History ==
During the War of the Pacific, Chile focused its efforts on its north, as with the war against the Peru-Bolivian Confederation, neglecting for a while, the occupation of Araucanía, Eastern Patagonia and Pampa Seca, leaving them for later. In 1843 Chile founded Fort Bulnes and in the 1870s occupied the territory south of the Santa Cruz River, founding the settlement called Puerto Gallegos (present-day Río Gallegos), while Argentina attempted to control San Gregorio Bay and controlled Isla Pavón and Isla de los Estados, as well as making great progress in the occupation of the north of the disputed region.

=== Conflict with indigenous people of the region, with royalist bands and the Argentine occupation of northern Eastern Patagonia ===
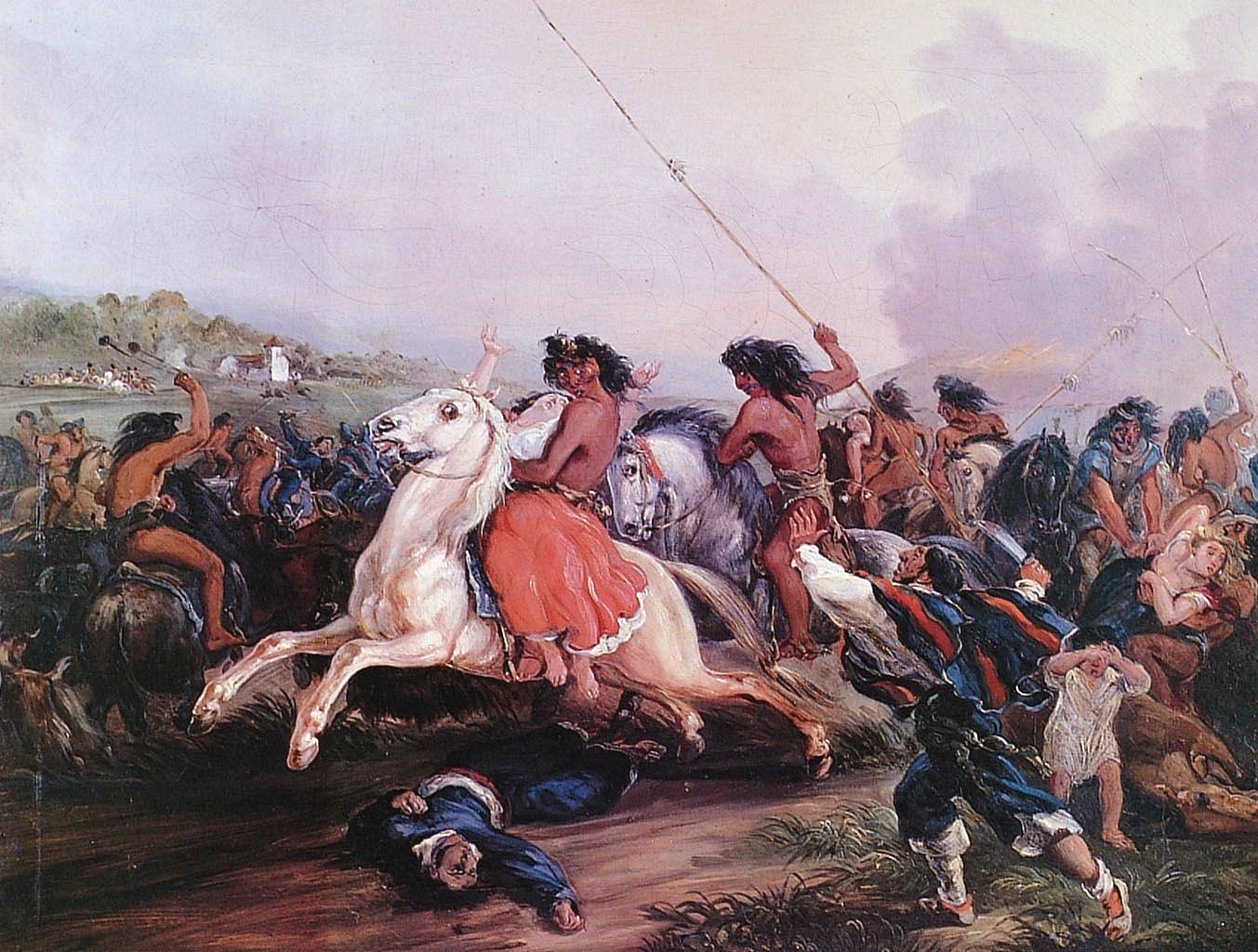
El malón (1845), by Mauricio Rugendas

In those territories bordering the incipient Argentine Republic, the indigenous people carried out the so-called "malones" perpetuating a theft of more than 8 million head of cattle (it should be taken into account that the raw material was more expensive than today in the world market), harming 35 thousand people, including women who were kidnapped, raped, who returned with children resulting from this and with serious psychological sequels.

Map of the effective presence of the Republic of Chile in Eastern Patagonia between 1810 and 1877 before the Argentine campaigns of Roca in 1877 and Villegas in 1884, and before the treaty of 1881.

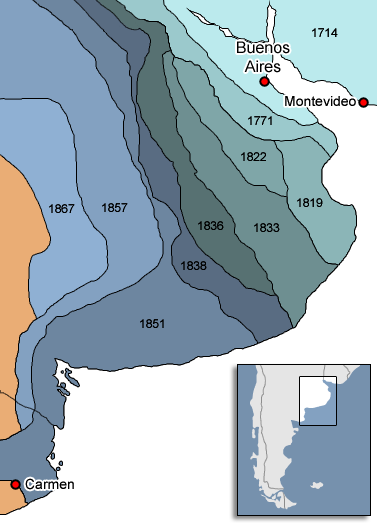
Map of the advance of the Argentine frontier until the establishment of zanja de Alsina

Although few antecedents of damage to Argentines prior to the 1820s against the Indians can be found, the truth is that in many cases the Creole was seen by the Indian as an invader, and sought to attack him, to defend himself and to obtain provisions. In other cases, the attacks corresponded to political actions due to the adhesion of many Indians to the royalist cause. These incursions came from the Pampa Seca, and from Patagonia. Juan Manuel de Rosas, before coming to power, set up a defense group in 1819, with which he began explorations from Chascomús to Neuquén and Mar Chiquita on November 15, 1825.

On November 20, 1826, Chile signed a diplomatic agreement with the United Provinces of the Río de la Plata in which the principle of uti possidetis iuris was recognized. However, the treaty was never ratified by Chile and therefore never entered into force.

The government of the United Provinces represented by Buenos Aires and specifically General Juan Gregorio de Las Heras, who arrived in Chile in 1813, did not express his annoyance on the part of the Río de la Plata government against the band of the Pincheira brothers, but rather, he expected from President Joaquín Prieto a reaction against the band, considering that the territories where the band acted (Neuquén and other territories east of the Andes) were, according to an unauthorized Chilean source, out of his jurisdiction.

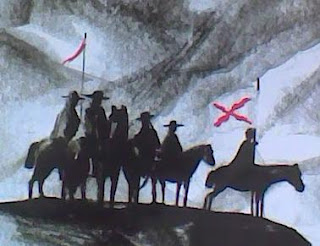
The Pincheira brothers were active between 1813 and 1832, being protagonists of the Guerra a muerte in Chile in favor of the Royalists.

The Pincheira carried out guerrilla actions in conjunction with approximately 300 other gunmen, in favor of the royalist cause, as did indigenous people who belonged to this side, even in that decade.

Rosas tried to reach direct agreements with the Pincheira, defending for Argentina what was the southern indigenous border of the viceroyalty of the Río de la Plata. With this objective he sent a letter to José Antonio Zúñiga, commander of the parties, dated November 8, 1830, describing the border that they should not cross:

The guards that belong to this province of my command and to that of Santa Fe, and which it is necessary that U.U. respect as a sacred thing, are: Patagones, Bahía Blanca, Tandel, Solores, Chascomuz, Ranchos, Monte, Lobos, Navarro, Luján, Fortín de Areco, Salto, Pergaminos, Rojas, Mercedes and Melincué. This is the inside line. The outside one runs from Bahía Blanca to Trimosí, from Trimosí to Cruz de la Guerra, from Cruz de la Guerra to Potroso, and from Potroso to Mercedes and Melincué, which line it is equally necessary that U.U. should respect. as the most sacred with all the estancias that are within them

— November 8, 1830, Letter from the government of Rosas to the Pincheira family

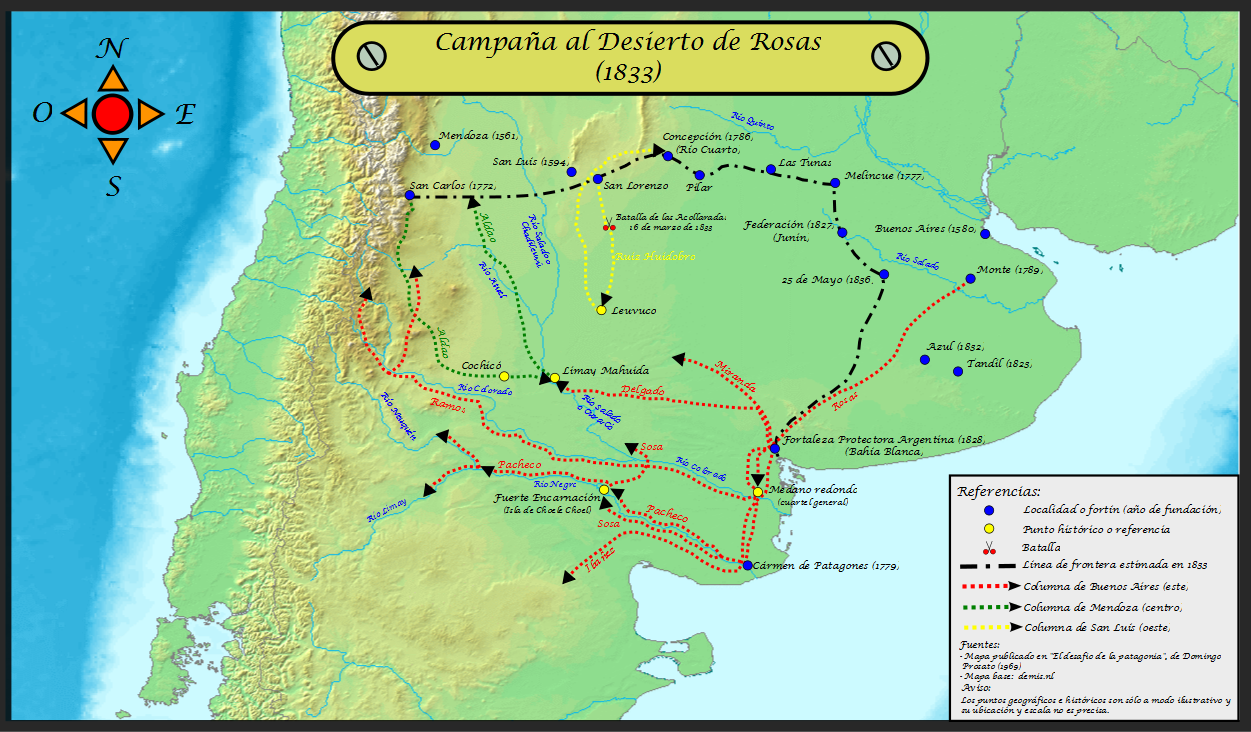
Map of Rosas' Desert Campaign with the movements of the different columns

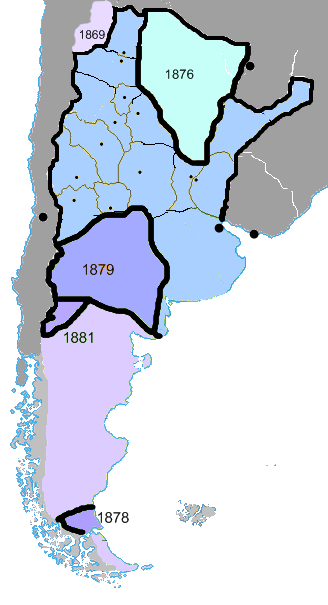
Map of the occupation of territory claimed by the Argentine State in the 19th century.

In 1833 and early 1834, Juan Manuel de Rosas commanded the military expedition known as the Rosas Desert Campaign, which was carried out during the government of Juan Ramón Balcarce against the Pampas Indians, the ranqueles, the tehuelches and the mapuches, located in the pampas and the north of Patagonia and which counted with the initial collaboration of the provinces affected by the Amerindian frontier.

The campaign had several purposes, all of them related, which were: to submit the Indians of the desierto or the interior land to the Creole obedience, to put an end to the Indigenous malones that constantly plagued the interior populations, to rescue the captives held by the aborigines, to incorporate lands for agriculture and cattle raising and to make effective the provincial sovereignties over the raided territories.

Several decades later, between 1878 and 1885, Julio Argentino Roca led the conquest of the Desert by which he conquered large extensions of territory that was in the hands of the Indigenous people, and which was legally in dispute with Chile, occupying the disputed territory to the north.

The first part of the so-called Desert Campaign, led by General Roca, was from 1879 to 1881 and it reached up to the Negro River. Only as a result of the treaty of 1881, the Desert campaign continued afterwards and crossed the Negro River where it was projected up to, approximately, what is now Rio Gallegos.

=== Proposal of annexation of Cuyo to Chile ===
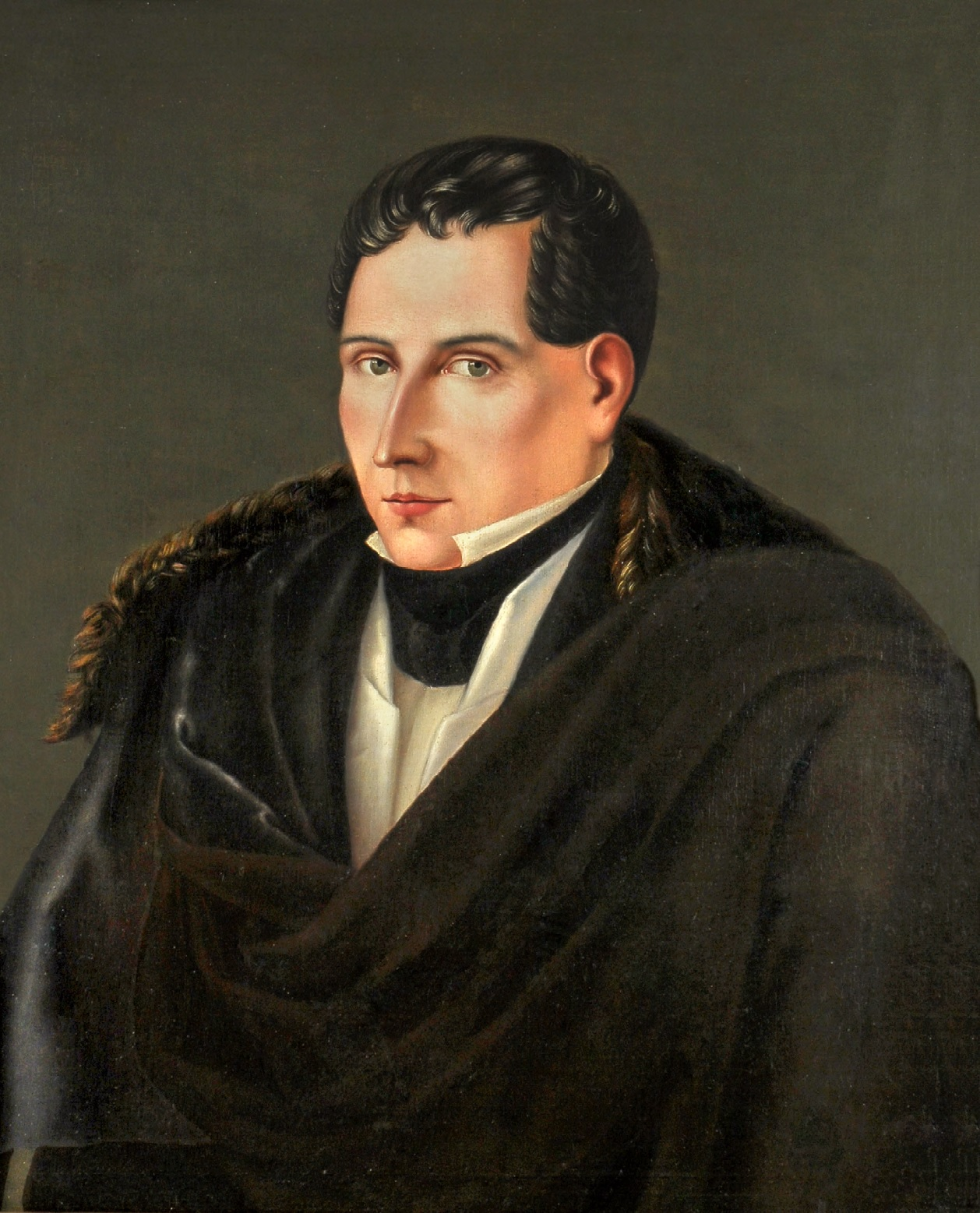
The Chilean minister, Diego Portales

During the civil wars in the River Plate, secession began to be considered in Cuyo. Isolation from the rest of the territory helped to create a feeling of reincorporation to Chile from which it was segregated in 1776. The main commercial relations of Mendoza and the surrounding cities were still linked to the Pacific and not to the Atlantic.

In 1835 a mission was sent to Palacio de La Moneda in Santiago with Juan Domingo Castro y Calvo and Juan de Rozas Corres, to propose the annexation in colloquial terms. At the same time, the influential Argentine citizens José Lisandro Calle, Vicente Gil and Casimiro Recuero they sought to approach Minister Diego Portales, however, he rejected the offer, arguing that such an annexation would have been a great responsibility of a province located on the other side of the Andes. Calle insisted by sending him a letter on March 11 to his Hacienda Rayado, in La Ligua. He argued that the Andes were "a hundred times" less difficult to cross than the desert that separated Mendoza from Buenos Aires and the Atlantic. This letter went unanswered, and instead a trade agreement was signed on April 3, ratified in Mendoza on July 3 and in Santiago on October 22.

Furthermore, the letter suggested that it would not be difficult to seize Mendoza, San Luis and San Juan, and to "admit them into the political association of this country", he wrote further arguing that the Mendocineans sympathized by blood ties with Chile much more than with the provinces of Córdoba, Buenos Aires or Salta, which has no cultural, linguistic and musical ties and that they were willing to go to war with Chile against the littoral provinces. Colonel Lorenzo Barcala was shot on August 1, 1835, accused of conspiring to assassinate the federal authorities of the province and of conspiring to make Mendoza, San Luis and San Juan part of Chile.

Although Cuyo had the Diamante River as its boundary, had it accepted, the Republic of Chile would have effectively controlled territory east of the Andes at an early stage, which would have facilitated colonization efforts in Eastern Patagonia.

=== Bernardo O'Higgins refers to the whole of Patagonia as Chilean ===
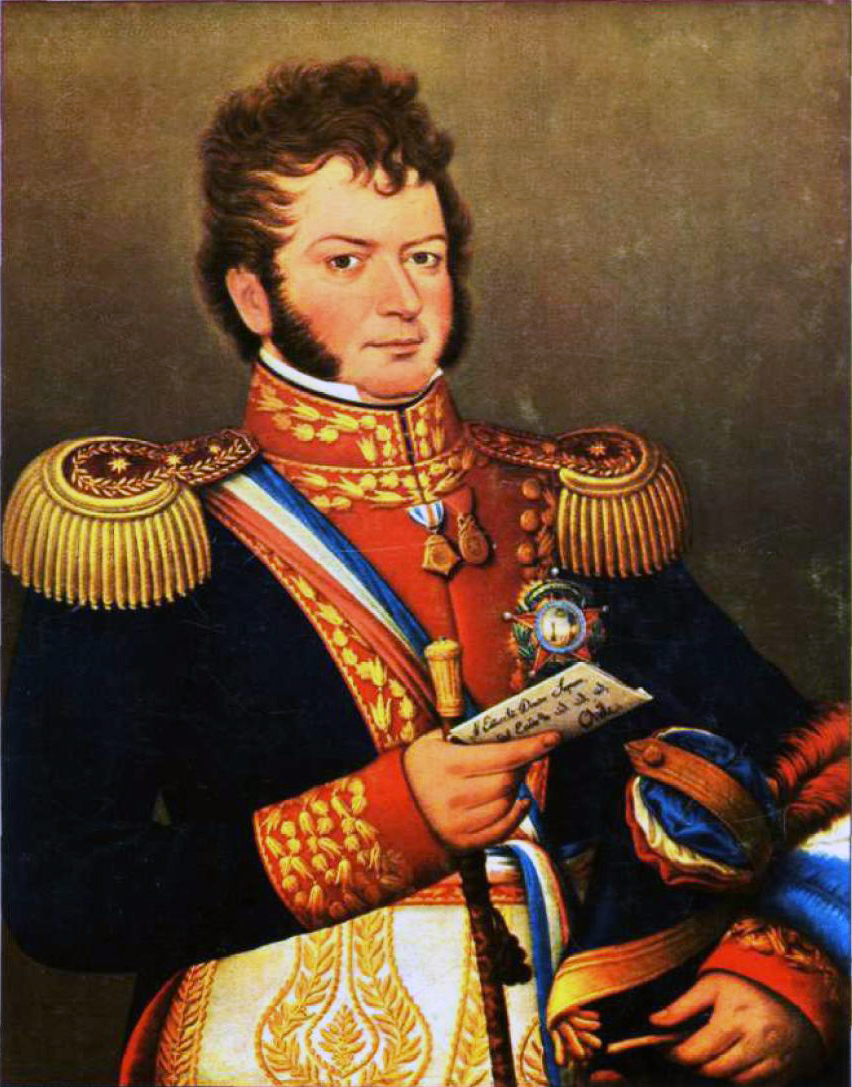
Bernardo O'Higgins spoke about the potential of the Atlantic coast in Patagonia.

In 1830 the Chilean politician Bernardo O'Higgins (Ambrosio's son) sent the Chilean president Joaquín Prieto a letter:

These matters, I repeat, that occupy my imagination allow me, my dear general, not only to recommend you, but also to impress upon you the great importance of calculating and acquiring by all possible means the friendship, not only of the Araucanians, but even more vigorously, of the Pehuenches and Huilliches, agreeing as I do with Molina, that all the inhabitants of the valleys of the East, as well as of the West of the Andes, are Chileans. I consider the Pehuenches, Puelches and Patagonians as our countrymen as the others born north of the BíoBío; and after the Independence of our country, no favorable event could give me greater satisfaction than to witness the civilization of all the children of Chile on both sides of the great mountain range and their union in one great family [...].I rejoice, then, my dear general, in the confidence that the day is not far distant when the barbarous and wandering woodcutter of the Pampas will become a civilized shepherd, and the poor and naked savage of the Tierra del Fuego an industrious and well-to-do fisherman

— Bernardo O'Higgins, 1830

The following year he sends a letter to the British Royal Navy talking about his country:

Chile old and new extends in the Pacific from Mejillones Bay to South New Shetland, at latitude 65° South and in the Atlantic from San Jose Peninsula at latitude 42° to New South Shetland, that is, 23° with a superabundance of excellent harbors in both oceans, and all of them salubrious in all seasons. A simple glance at the map of South America suffices to prove that Chile, as described above, holds the keys to that vast portion of the South Atlantic.

— Bernardo O'Higgins, 1831

He spent the year 1840 in his Montalván hacienda, concerned during the day with the work of the slaves and peasants and at night with the study and dispatching of correspondence to his friends. He was especially concerned about the situation of the indigenous tribes, which had to be integrated into civilization and the Catholic faith. He was also concerned about the integration and colonization of the Magellanic lands. He learned of the latest explorations of Commander Robert FitzRoy in the Patagonian channels and considered that the government should urgently exercise its sovereignty in the region and facilitate the navigation of the Strait of Magellan through the use of steam tugboats.

On the morning of October 24, 1842, he felt energetic so he had himself dressed, wanted to be seated in an armchair, but he could not stand it, so he was laid back on his bed. Suddenly, in the midst of his shortness of breath, he exclaimed: "Magallanes!" and expired, dying on the spot.

=== Incident in the mountainous area of Talca, potreros of the Andes ===
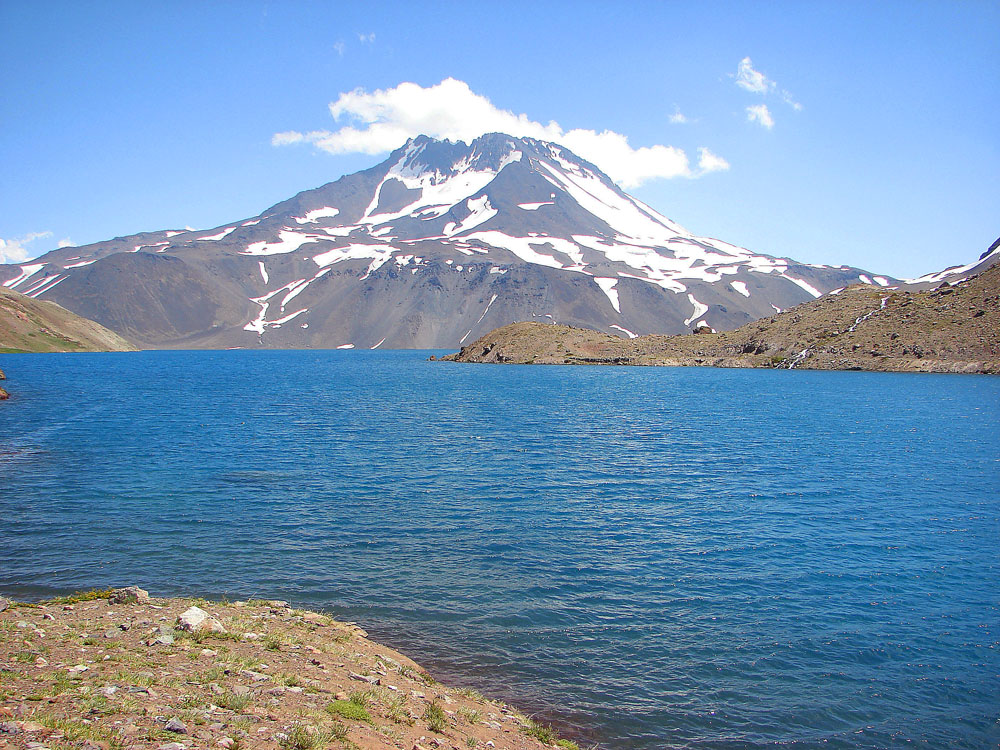
Lake Teno or Planchon, in the mountainous area of Maule, Chile

In the context of the tensions between the unitary and federal sides in River Plate politics, the presence of exiles from this country in Chile, and the cutting of commercial traffic with Mendoza ordered on April 13, 1842, by the Chilean president Manuel Bulnes, and the anger of the Mendocino governor José Félix Aldao (from the federal side of Juan Manuel de Rosas), a tense event occurs in March 1845, when the Chilean cattle rancher residing in Talca, Manuel Jirón, is approached by a gang of ten or twelve Argentine rustlers coming from Cuyo in his hacienda. They requested a payment of money in the name of the Governor's Office of Mendoza. They asked for payment for the cattle grazing that Jirón was doing in the pastures of El Yeso, Los Ángeles, Valenzuela and Montañés.

Jiron paid the amount when they threatened to take away his animals, which he later confirmed to the Chilean authorities, expecting compensation for the money. The incident was known as the "mountain potreros issue".

The territory where this occurred is located south of the Diamante River in the mountainous area of Talca, so the territory was understood by Jiron as part of Chilean jurisdiction.

The Municipality of Talca was in charge of protecting the cattle ranchers in the area, and the investigation of the case showed that the aggressors came from San Rafael de Mendoza Fortress.

The Government of Chile sent a note of protest to the Government of Argentina saying:

From the inquiry which by order of this Government has been made, it appears that the pastures are situated in Chilean territory, without any doubt having arisen on this point up to the present, both from the situation of the places, and from the immemorial possession of Chilean citizens, from the recognition of the bordering Indians, from history, tradition, and from whatever titles may be alleged in favor of the rights of sovereignty and property. Not only, therefore, has an illegal act of force and depredation been committed against Chilean citizens, but also an attack against the sovereignty of this Republic and an outrageous violation of its territory.

To which Argentina did not protest.

On December 4, 1846, a technical commission was created in Buenos Aires, composed of Carmen José Domínguez and Lieutenant Nicolás Villanueva, which published on April 27, 1847, in which they argued the territories where the incident occurred as Argentine, although not specifying whether or not they belonged to the province of Cuyo, as they were south of the Diamante River:

The Llaretas and Planchón mountain ranges, which are designated by the attached plan, are an extension of the previous ones, and the Valenzuela, Montañés, Yeso and Los Ángeles valleys, which are in the same situation as that of Tunuyán, cannot by any means be considered an integral part of Chilean territory

— 27 April 1847, Technical Commission, Buenos Aires

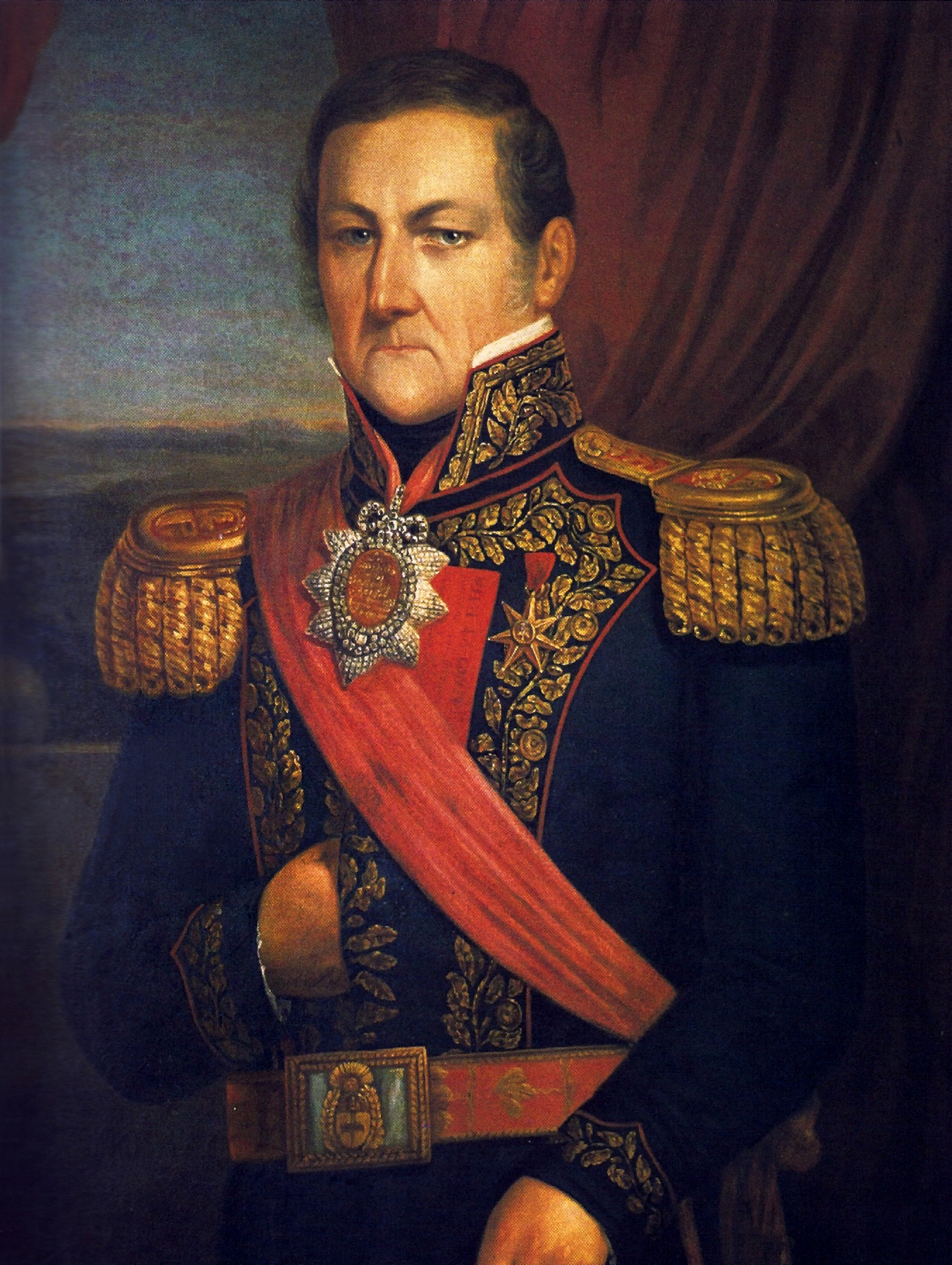
Argentine president, Juan Manuel de Rosas

The Argentine president, Juan Manuel de Rosas, sent officials to tax Talca ranchers in the area in question in 1847 and 1848. By then he had already resolved to incorporate into his country the territory south of the Diamante River to the Río Negro, most of which he knew after his 1833 expeditions.

After the 1881 treaty the boundary divided the disputed area with the areas of Valle Hermoso, Las Leñas and the eastern sector of Paso Potrerillos for Argentina, and the lands near Curicó of Potrero Grande, Potrero Chico, El Planchón, Teno Lagoons, those of the Maule river basin, such as the Maule river basin, such as the lagoon and river of La Invernada, and the sector of El Colorado for Chile.

=== Chilean incorporation of Southern Patagonia during the 19th century ===
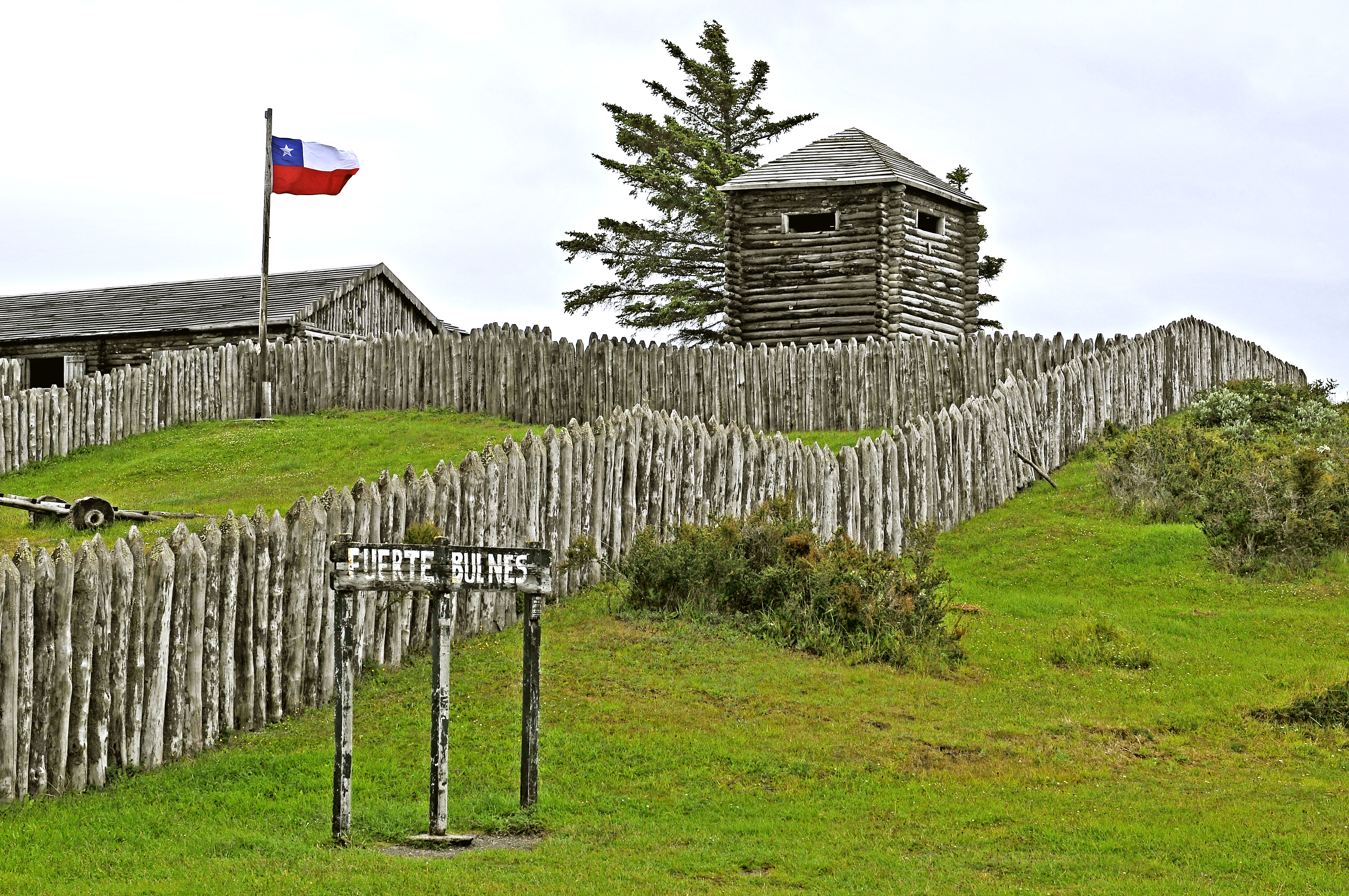
Chile builds Fort Bulnes on the coast of the Brunswick Peninsula in 1843 with the aim of taking possession of the Strait of Magellan and the surrounding territory, Argentina complained diplomatically this act in 1847

Being fully aware of how important it was for the future development of Chile to preserve full maritime communication and trade with the Atlantic powers, it was necessary for the republic to secure possession of the Strait of Magellan. The action was intended to forestall European intervention in the territory, not provoke a quarrel with Argentina.

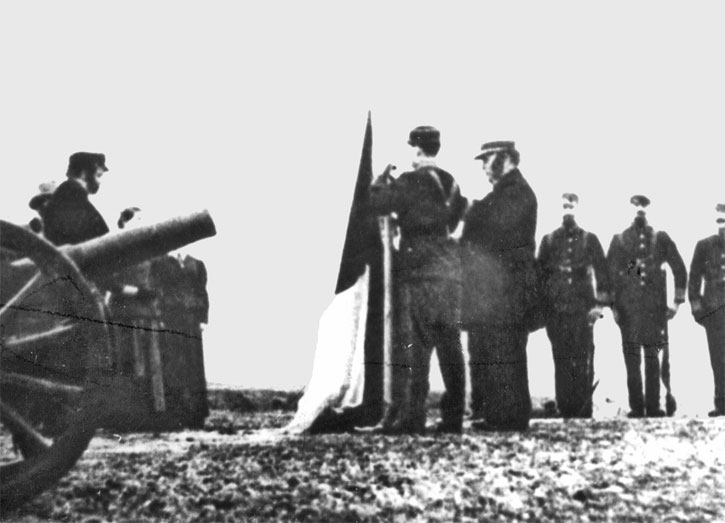
The Taking possession of the territory of Magallanes, reproduction of the event.

To achieve this objective, the government of President Bulnes sent a schooner (the "Ancud") to take possession of it in the name of the republic. Domingo Espiñeira, the intendant of Chiloé, organized and directed the operations that were executed by frigate captain John Williams Wilson, who finally carried out the Takeover of the Strait of Magellan on September 21, 1843, at the historic site of Puerto del Hambre, founding Fuerte Bulnes.

This was done in part of the eastern section, that is, in a sector between the Andean mountain range and the Atlantic, so that from that moment Chile began to exercise rights of possession east of the Andes

...we take possession of the Straits of Magellan and its territory in the name of the Republic of Chile, to whom it belongs as declared in Article 1 of its Political Constitution,...

The addition of "and its territory" would later give Chilean chancellors the argument that the dispute with Argentina was not limited only to the shores of the strait, so that Chile's uninterrupted possession of it also granted it possession of a much larger inland area, at least as far as the Santa Cruz River.

Due to the inhospitable climate it was not possible to form a large and stable population, the governor José de los Santos Mardones deemed it convenient to found the city of Punta Arenas in the Sandy Point (Punta Arenosa) in 1848, after six years of innumerable hardships, to the north of the territory and with a better climate.

Once the population finished moving and settling in the city of Punta Arenas, Fort Bulnes began its decadence and its ruins were even set on fire by the Chilean Army artillery lieutenant Miguel José Cambiaso during the Cambiaso Mutiny. Between 1941 and 1943 the reconstruction of the fort was carried out and it was reopened in 1943.

In 1852 the governor of Magallanes, Bernhard Eunom Philippi died in October of that year murdered by indigenous Tehuelche in an assault in the vicinity of Punta Arenas in Cabeza del Mar, while trying to resolve a local conflict by peaceful and diplomatic means, however, the reasons for his murder were not clarified by the authorities of the time, nor were the perpetrators of the crime convicted. The governor wanted to explore, populate and make southern Patagonia produce wealth. His death occurs when he was preparing to install an outpost to the north, which would have been followed by others, consolidating Chile's dominion in the southern territories.

Chilean citizens populated the northern part of the Neuquén valley, across the mountain range from the historic region of Araucanía, establishing clusters of cattle and sheep ranches called "Chilecitos". Chilean state officials lived among them and both mestizo, castizos, and indigenous Chileans recognized their authority.

Chile sought to establish effective sovereignty by securing recognition of its sovereignty by the Indians with military ranks, gifts and payments given to tribal chiefs, who were likewise sought after by Argentina. The Indians cunningly served their own interests by creating division between the two sides. In the 1840s, Argentina had a settlement on the Negro River which was the southernmost at that time.

Between 1852 and 1855 both countries held a very detailed historical-geographical debate, accumulating an important body of documents to prove their respective claims.

Minister Antonio Varas upon learning of the historical studies published by Miguel Luis Amunátegui in 1853, considered them a revelation, however, the government did not divulge such knowledge nor did it instruct public officials in this regard. Soon, the territory of Magallanes was enlarged to include the Santa Cruz River on the Atlantic, with Amunitegui's report as the basis, Chile also claimed to the north, up to the Río Negro in the Atlantic, and the Río Diamante, at the latitude of Buenos Aires, in the mountain range. The Argentine government upon learning of Amunátegui's book, commissioned Dalmacio Vélez Sarsfield in 1855 a response, which, in turn, was subsequently answered by Amunátegui.

In 1856 a Treaty was signed between both countries which reaffirmed their commitment to the principle of uti possidetis juris, however, they maintained their respective differences on what this was.

In 1859 the Argentine Luis Piedrabuena unofficially established a post on Pavón Island and in 1865 Welsh settlers in the service of Argentina established a settlement in Chubut with the intention of penetrating the territory in dispute between the two countries. In parallel, the governor of Magallanes claimed that the Chilean government did not have the necessary means to extend its authority over those distant Patagonian coasts. The Chilean presence on that coast was occasionally manifested with the appearance of armed parties in search of fugitives or deserters. The lieutenant Miguel José Cambiaso, mutinied in 1851, was in the estuary of the Gallegos river, by order of José de los Santos Mardones and also the governor Jorge Schythe was there.

An example of how vital the possession of the Strait of Magellan was for the Chilean leadership of the time can be found in the description made by its chancellor, Adolfo Ibáñez Gutiérrez:

The possession of the Strait of Magellan in all its extension is for Chile of such importance, that in it it looks bound, not only its progress and development, but also its own existence as an independent nation. That Strait is the path that Providence has opened to communicate with the continents that bathe the Atlantic Ocean and to give way to trade and industry from the Old World come to fertilize the countries located in the west.

— Adolfo Ibáñez Gutiérrez

There was a failed Chilean settlement in "Puerto Gallegos" on the banks of the homonymous river since March 4, 1873. The governor of Magallanes, Óscar Viel y Toro by order of the minister Adolfo Ibáñez Gutiérrez was in charge of founding the settlement, this would only last six weeks after the diplomatic agreement between this country and the Argentine Nation.

During that year, in moments of tension with Chile, Argentina had sought accession to the Treaty of Defensive Alliance (Bolivia–Peru), a secret pact that sought to force Chile to accept the borders convenient to the three bordering states. The Argentine Chamber of Deputies in secret session approved the accession in 1873, but the government of Buenos Aires failed to reach an agreement with that of Bolivia over the Tarija issue. When Argentina offered Peru a bipartite treaty, Peru rejected the offer.

After the capture off the coast of Patagonia of the Jeanne Amélie on 27 April 1876 and the Devonshire by the cañonera Magallanes on 15 October 1878 protests in Buenos Aires rose to such a degree that the government decided to send its sea fleet south to strengthen its claim in the area.

In 1879, British Captain of the Chilean Navy Juan Tomás Rogers first sighted the glacier, which he named "Francisco Gormaz", after the director of the Hydrographic Office of the Chilean Navy, the sponsoring organization of the discovering expedition. Some years later, Rudolph Hauthal, attached to the Argentine Boundary Commission, came across the glacier, and decided to name it "Bismarck" in honor of the then Prussian Chancellor. It is currently known as Perito Moreno Glacier.

The National Government, convinced of the need to preserve sovereignty on the Patagonian coasts, appoints the Vapor Villarino under the command of Captain Federico Spurr, to make the regular voyage between Buenos Aires and the ports of Patagonia.

Río Gallegos, an Argentine settlement, was born when the Sub Prefectura Marítima (Maritime Sub Prefecture) was installed on December 19, 1885. Its destiny was apparently very modest, in the material aspect, but of dense content for its purpose: "To exercise permanent, direct and categorical dominion over the continental end of the country, within the framework of the defense of the Sovereignty".

=== Dispute over the Strait of Magellan and the territories south of the Santa Cruz River ===
Chile's effective presence in Southern Patagonia (1843-1879).

Argentina claimed the Chilean takeover of the strait by means of the official letter of December 15, 1847, signed by the Minister of Foreign Affairs, Felipe Arana.

This also occurred after an armed incident of cattle ranchers in the Neuquén area, in March of the same year, after which Manuel Camilo Vial, the Chilean Foreign Minister, referred to the problem saying that there was "the need to prepare an exact demarcation of the boundaries of the territory of each of the two republics, which, both having belonged to the same government, cannot but be in a complete state of uncertainty". The Argentine government responded by claiming for itself all the territory south of the Diamante River, including the Strait and Tierra del Fuego.

In 1848, the Chilean government invited the Argentine government to a comparative study of sovereign rights over Patagonia. Argentina accepted, but asked to postpone the debate because it wished to gather the necessary cartographies and documents for its plea, and so it expressed this to Chile.

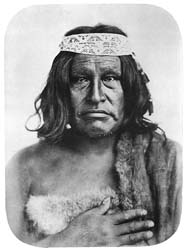
The cacique Casimiro Biguá, loyal to Argentina.

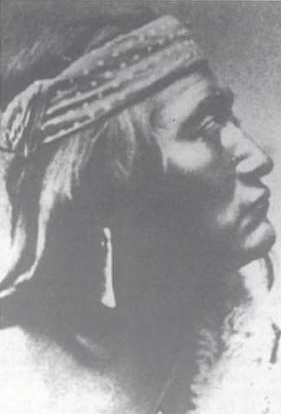
The cacique Papón, loyal to Chile.

In 1862 the Argentine sailor, Luis Piedrabuena, made an alliance with the cacique Casimiro Biguá to found a settlement in San Gregorio Bay in the Strait of Magellan. Casimiro Biguá was an old acquaintance in the Chilean settlement of Punta Arenas.

During the visit to San Gregorio, Piedrabuena presented Casimiro with the Argentine flag of his ship, the former "Nancy", which had been renamed "Espora", in homage to a national sailor. Both agreed that the eastern part of the strait should correspond to the sovereignty of Argentina.

In 1863, Piedrabuena arrived again at the sheltered bay of San Gregorio (a place that was his obsession) protected by the San Gregorio mountain range (about 200 meters high) and where hunting was abundant. There he had his second encounter with Casimiro, now the latter with the title of Cacique. The sailor told the Tehuelche about his idea of creating a colony of his country in San Gregorio itself, which would counterbalance the one Chile was developing in Punta Arenas, this idea had the enthusiastic support of Casimiro.

For this reason, at the end of 1864, Casimiro accompanied Piedrabuena on a sailing trip to the city of Buenos Aires to be presented to the national authorities and make them aware of the indigenous adhesion to the cause of the republic, negotiating a treaty that would be beneficial for both parties (the Argentine state and the Tehuelches).

His proposal detailed that he would make a:

...possession of the territory and port of San Gregorio in the strait (...) in the name of the Argentine Government; that if the government authorizes him to verify it, with all the indigenous forces at his disposal, he will respect the flag and the territory"; that "to start the village he intends to form, he only needs the Government to help him with the tools to build on the port a wooden house sufficient for the installation of himself and his family.; that to start the village he intends to form, he only needs the Government to help him with the tools to build on the port a wooden house sufficient for the installation of himself and his family.

The Argentine president, Bartolomé Mitre, named Casimiro "Cacique General de San Gregorio" and promised to send the required aid. The Argentine government granted Doroteo Mendoza the rank of captain of National Guards and appointed him to be the advisor-secretary of Cacique Casimiro.

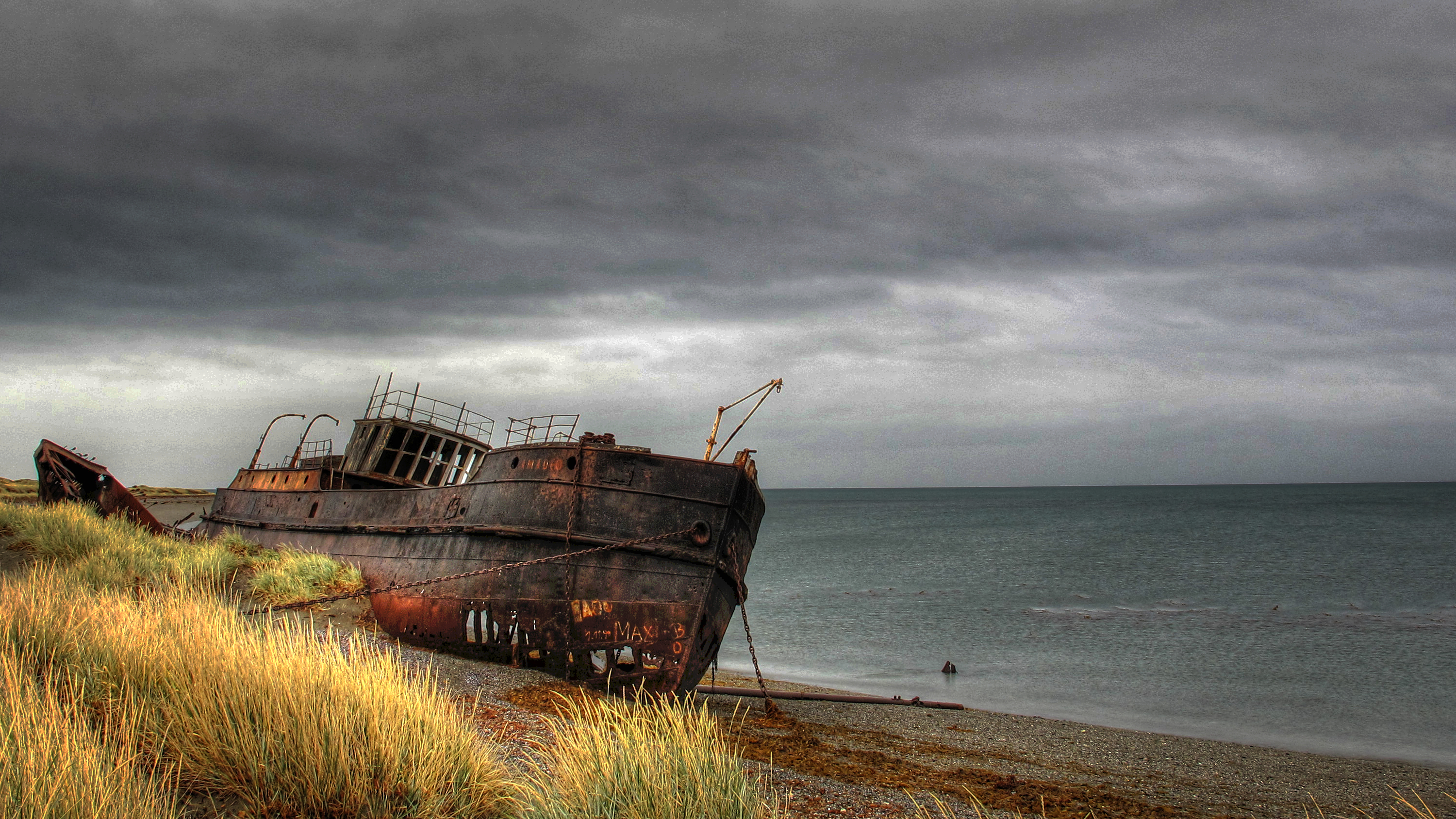
San Gregorio Bay in the Strait of Magellan

Upon returning to the strait, Casimiro showed a great attachment to the Argentine cause, beginning to perform acts of sovereign presence in the area. In an interview with the governor of Punta Arenas in 1865, he expressed his virtual ignorance of Chile's jurisdiction over the eastern Patagonian territory, showing him that he was acting not as a Tehuelche but as an Argentine authority, by showing him that he was paid by the authorities of El Plata and that he had a high military rank. The cacique was definitively won, by means of gifts, honors and entertainments, to the Argentine cause.

It is true, Mr. Governor, I am Argentine and I tell you that I am the principal chief of the Patagonian coasts up to the tips of the Andes mountain ranges, since I am the chief appointed by my Excellency the National Government of the Argentine Republic, which is the one that has given me my titles so that I can make myself respected everywhere in my pampa.

The governor replied that if he answered that he really felt he was Chilean he would give him 9 ounces of gold as payment for services, but Casimiro indicated that it would not be possible because he "was not Chilean, but Argentine".

Casimiro waited unsuccessfully in San Gregorio for the ship with the materials. Faced with the possible decision of the governor of Punta Arenas to extend the dominion of the Magellanic colony to the Santa Cruz River, Piedrabuena asked the cacique to leave the bay and move his entire tribe to Pavón Island. Casimiro gathered his hosts from two nuclei, one in the pampas and the other, in January 1865, in San Gregorio; both groups united at a point called Comlel (this denomination corresponds to Coy-Inlet) and finally marched to the island, where they arrived on February 14, settling their huts by the river, to continue waiting there for the ship that would bring the supplies to build the Magellanic settlement.

In that same year, a party of Indians arrived in Punta Arenas, old acquaintances of the governor, carrying an Argentine flag (until that occasion they had entered with the Chilean flag). The Chilean representative, annoyed by the incident, told them that he would no longer allow them to enter the colony with that flag, and asking them for it, he gave them the Chilean flag in exchange, telling them that it was "a prettier one". The latter immediately made them fly them on their awnings.

A year later, Juan Cornell continued to demand that the shipment of the vessel with the materials be fulfilled, and even offered a private vessel, so that it would not represent any cost for the state. The fact was that the Argentine government had its eyes and energies focused on the northern border, and with Argentina already engaged in the war against Paraguay, its leaders were convinced that it would be a serious mistake to generate a new source of conflict with the western country. Meanwhile, Casimiro's secretary, Doroteo Mendoza, perished strangely at the hands of a cacique, on the return trip.

In May 1865 Casimiro returned from the pampas and wintered in the port of San Gregorio. The ship that was supposed to bring the promised materials never did. After the snows they returned to the pampas to hunt guanacos and choiques.

Piedrabuena and Casimiro still kept alive the hope of being able to realize the foundational project, so both remained patiently expectant, waiting for a new opportunity.

But Piedrabuena was not discouraged, so that, without official support, he set sail from Buenos Aires on his fragile vessel to the southern regions on October 26, 1868, with the purpose of carrying out on his own the occupation of San Gregorio Bay for his country, a task that was thus reduced to his own human resources.

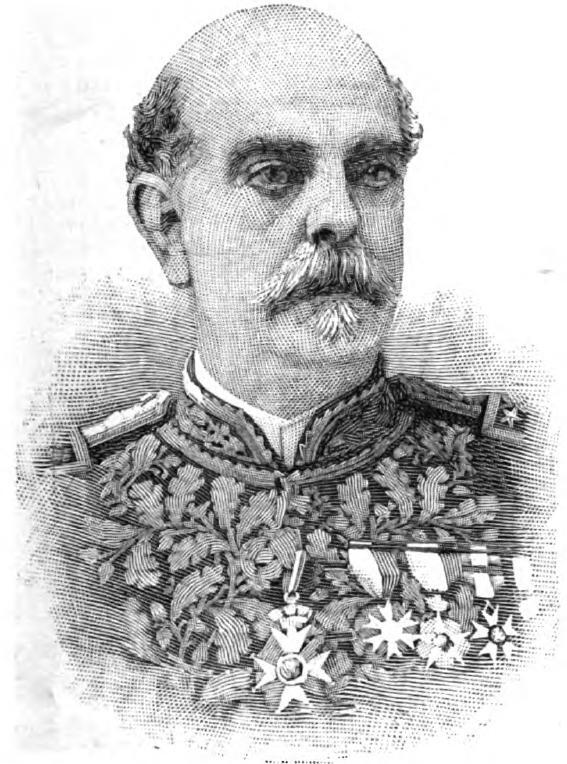
The Chilean sailor,Óscar Viel y Toro.

The navigation was tortuous due to the storms that accompanied him incessantly. First he went through his factory at Isla de los Estados and then to Isla Pavón, to finally set course for Punta Arenas. He was only able to anchor the "Espora" in the port of Punta Arenas in February 1869. During that year he worked on the Isla de los Estados. Finally he embarked, together with G. H. Gardener and two other men, for the strait. He tried to make land at the entrance of the strait to place the beacon, but furious storms prevented him from doing so, so he set course again for Punta Arenas. The day after arriving, he was visited by the governor, Lieutenant Commander of the Chilean Navy Oscar Viel y Toro, who recommended him "not to populate that colony, wait for a diplomatic resolution between both governments to remain in friendship", warning him that he was also authorized to prohibit it, counting on "artillery" to impose his purpose; in the same way he notified him that he would proceed in the same way with the luminous signal that the Argentine was planning to install at the eastern entrance of the strait.

Piedrabuena at first gave in to the serious warning of the Chilean authority without insisting on his objectives, however, a few days later he sailed to San Gregorio Bay, where he arrived in March 1870, with the ships "Espora" and "Julia". On the shore of the bay, Piedrabuena had a wooden hut erected as an "observatory", with the apparent purpose of facilitating trade with the Tehuelches and the real intention of laying the foundations for the foundation of a colony. When Viel was warned, he ordered the construction to be dismantled and forced the Argentine sailor to leave the place. Faced with the possibility that the beacon he intended to erect would be destroyed by the artillery of Chilean ships, he decided to deposit it on Pavón Island until he received official authorization from the Argentine authorities, something that finally never happened because they wanted to avoid a conflict with Chile.

Soon after, from Pavón Island, Piedrabuena returned to San Gregorio, surprised to see that the Chileans had not yet populated the port that had so dazzled him. There he met with Casimiro, to whom he warned him to be on the alert for the next moves of the Puntarenas authorities.

Piedrabuena, displeased by the predictable hostility he was already suffering in Punta Arenas, and the attitudes of permanent rejection of the project he received from the succession of rulers who administered his country, wrote to a friend about his regret:

As an Argentine, it is very embarrassing for me to have to observe impassively all the advances of the Chileans in this piece of soil of my homeland, which it seems that the government abandons to its pretensions (...) "If I had instructions in writing and not verbally, it would not be me or my Patagonians who would abandon the bay of San Gregorio without achieving our attempts. Because of these and other things I am being the target of the hostilities of the Chileans in the colony, who do not cease to persecute me; and as if they did not have enough with my person, they are also furious with the interests I have in the colony. Their policy is to seek my ruin so that in this way I may be frightened and move away from these places (...) "they will not achieve this as long as I feel Argentine blood flowing in my veins. I do not aspire to anything, I only want to have in my conscience the satisfaction of having fulfilled my duty as the most honest of Argentines, which may be worth something for my children tomorrow.

— Casimiro Biguá

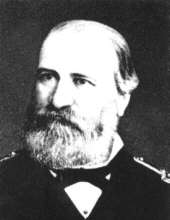
The Argentine sailor Luis Piedrabuena.

Around 1874, the cacique Casimiro died as a result of alcoholism, and with him, the influence that Argentina tried to exert in the Strait of Magellan finally ended, since all the Tehuelche caciques (Olki, Sámel, Kaile, Cholpa, etc.) swore loyalty to Chile, even Casimiro's son, the cacique Papón, and all of them were assigned salaries and food rations, as well as the Chilean state, and the Chilean state assigned salaries and food rations to them.) swore loyalty to Chile, even Casimiro's son, cacique Papón, and to all of them the Chilean state assigned salaries and food rations, just as the Argentine state did with Casimiro when he was alive. Luis Piedrabuena remained in southern Patagonia until mid 1875, when he settled permanently in Buenos Aires, where he died on August 10, 1883, at the age of 49; in 1878 his wife had died, at the age of 41, victim of pulmonary tuberculosis, contracted during the harsh southern winters.

He achieved great renown in the colony of Magallanes from 1870 to 1890, to whom the governor Diego Dublé Almeyda granted the title of "Chilean Subdelegate of Patagonia" in 1873.

Cacique Papón established an alliance with the Chilean governor Diego Dublé Almeyda, so that the seven hundred Tehuelches who adhered to his intentions, from the territory located between the Santa Cruz River and the Strait of Magellan, would also swear allegiance to the Chilean State, which appointed him subdelegate of Chilean Patagonia.

The latter country, after renewing its alliance, would begin to populate the Magellanic continental coast from 1878 with sheep ranches, including in bahía San Gregorio, in addition to bringing cattle directly from the Falkland Islands.

Adolfo Ibáñez Gutiérrez as Chilean Foreign Minister argued that the boundary with Argentina should be set at the 70th meridian west longitude, that is, to the east of the Andes mountain range, until it touched the Santa Cruz River, and from there to the Atlantic. To avoid a territorial and strategic imbalance. Ibáñez sent notes to the Argentine ambassador in Chile, Félix Frías arguing that the Strait of Magellan is of great importance to Chile, stating that the water mass is "not only her progress and development, but also for her very existence as an independent nation".

=== Darwin's influence on the Chilean elite's undervaluation of the territory ===
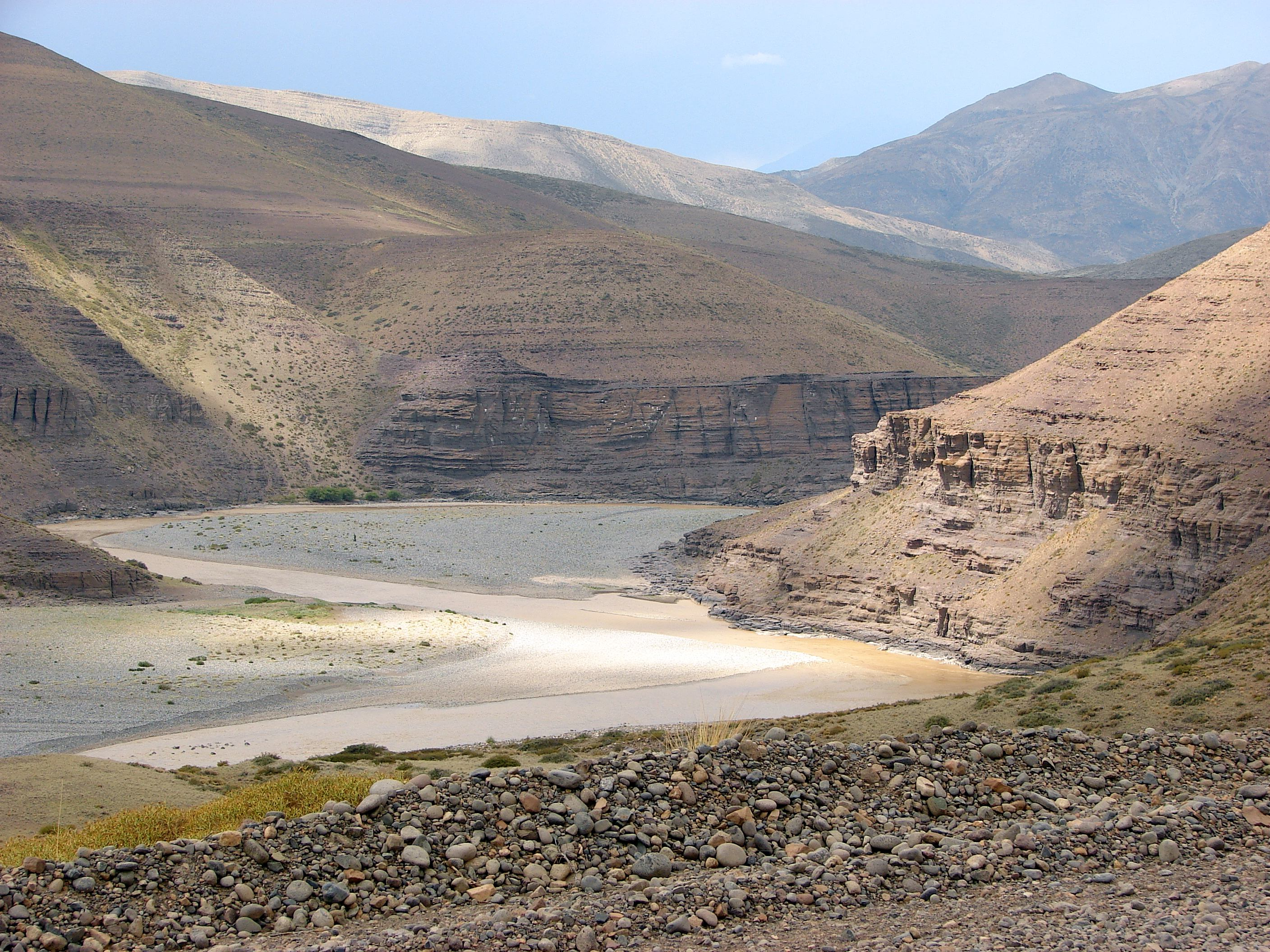
The Neuquén River in the Patagonian Desert.

In early 1865, in the context of the Spanish-South American War, the Chilean Pan-Americanist José Victorino Lastarria by heading a diplomatic mission whose main objective was to prepare an alliance between Argentina and Chile against Spain. Lastarria was also in charge of negotiating the possession of Patagonia, proposing an agreement that left Argentina almost all of the territory in question, with the exception of Tierra del Fuego and some other nearby portions. On his return to his country, his negotiations were not too strongly condemned by the government, and were later one of the arguments used by the Argentine authorities to justify their subsequent domination of the great majority of Patagonia. Lastarria did not believe that Chile should possess those territories and, given his Pan-Americanist convictions, he was very reluctant to go to war over them.

On February 22 of that year he sent his superior in the Chilean Foreign Office, Álvaro Covarrubias Ortúzar, a memorandum explaining why renouncing the claims to East Patagonia would be advantageous.

The transaction would be advantageous for us because our titles to Patagonia are not sustainable, and even if they were, we should have no illusions that that extension is anything other than primitive, uncultivable lands, and in every way ungrateful to the habits and aspirations of industry. Our border in the Strait as far as Gregorio Bay leaves us in it a necessary and even greater extension than we need, for our security and for the occupation of our southern territory

— José Victorino Lastarria

At that time the Argentine president was Bartolomé Mitre, who having rejected Lastarria's offer, on July 28 of that same year decreed the formation of a settlement in Chubut, forty leagues south of Río Negro and in the middle of the Patagonian territory, in addition to the creation of the colony in the bay of San Gregorio in the Strait of Magellan. His successor, Domingo Faustino Sarmiento, who came to power in 1868, provided resources to the colonies created by Mitre in the region and promoted the formation of new ones through bills that were discussed in the Argentine Congress between 1871 and 1873. Until before that the balance was in favor of Chile as to the strategic advantage of controlling the region.

Other Chilean politicians and academics of that time, among them Diego Barros Arana and Benjamín Vicuña Mackenna were unaware of the value of those lands in terms of natural resources and fertility of the terrain, which would be discovered subsequent to the territorial dispute, considering that Patagonia was not worth a conflict with Argentina based on the travels of Charles Darwin between 1833 and 1835, in which he said "this land is blessed by sterility", however, he was referring exclusively to the extra-Andean Patagonia (Patagonian Desert), which is part of the region. Darwin's description had a powerful influence on successive Chilean plenipotentiary ministers who thought that the description was of the whole of Patagonia. After the end of the dispute in 1881, the chapter corresponding to this assertion was deleted from subsequent editions of Darwin's book.

=== Fierro-Sarratea Pact ===
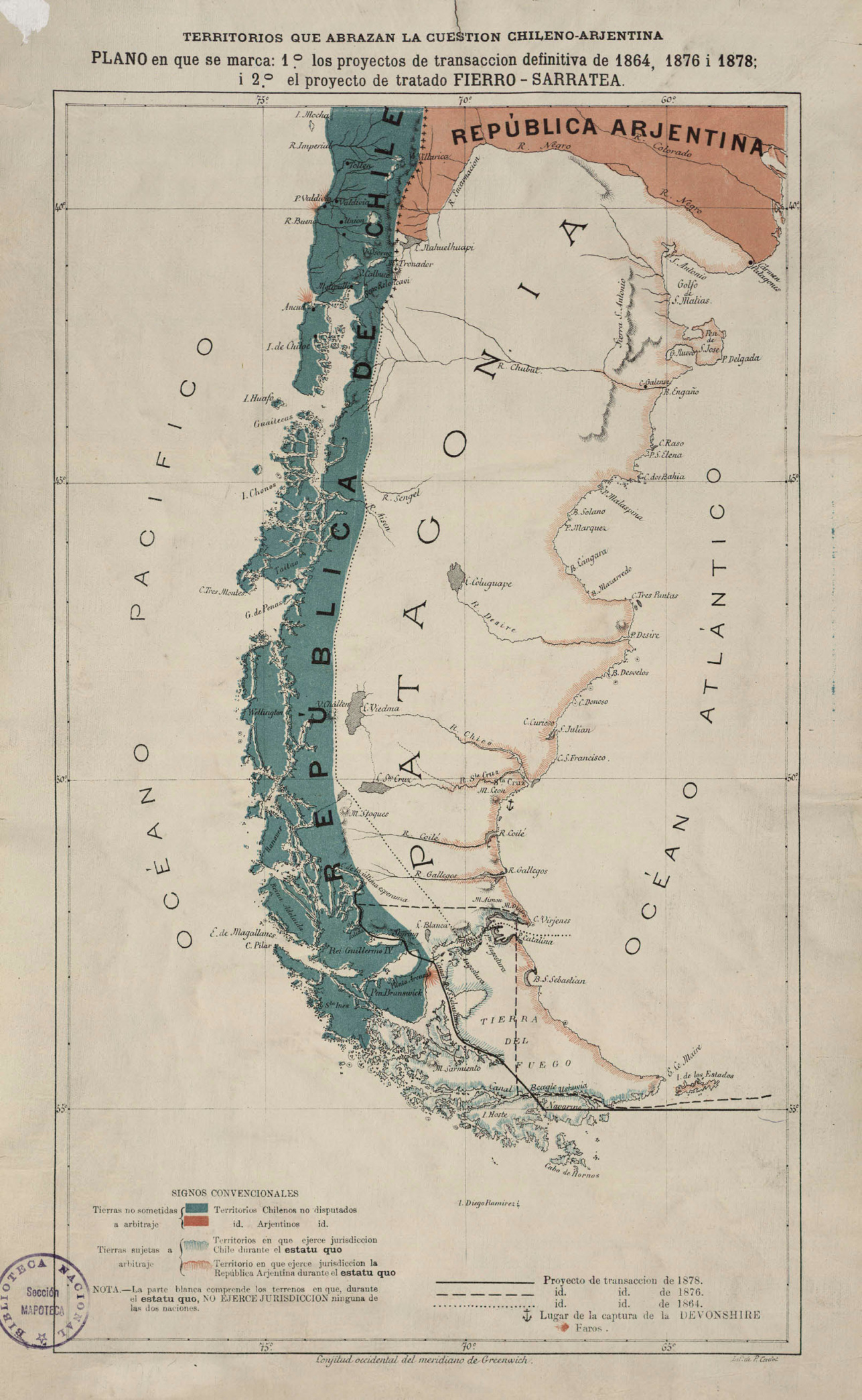
Map of the proposed projects from 1864, 1876, and 1878, and the Fierro-Sarratea project.

On December 6 of the same year, the Fierro-Sarratea pact was signed in Santiago de Chile by the Chilean Minister of Foreign Affairs Alejandro Fierro and the Argentine consul in Santiago Mariano Sarratea. The agreement was approved by both houses of the Congress of Chile and on January 14, 1879, the Chilean government informed the Argentine government that it approved it. However, the Congress of Argentina never approved the agreement, and thus, never came into effect.

Article 6 established that until a boundary agreement was reached, Chile would exercise jurisdiction over the coasts of the Strait of Magellan and Argentina over East Patagonia coasts and its islands. On January 4, 1879, the corvette Cabo de Hornos commanded by Luis Piedrabuena arrived at Puerto Santa Cruz with the news of the cessation of hostilities between the two countries and carrying on board the surgeon major Federico R. Cuñado -grandson of the Spanish physician Gabriel Cuñado- in addition to carrying provisions, coal cargo and the launch steamboat Monte León needed to provide fresh water at Pavón Island, since the estuary of the river where the port was settled is brackish water. In addition, it would have arrived alongside the bomber República.

For Chile, the pact had a very important effect because it allowed, at least, to postpone the border problems with Argentina and focus on the solution of its problems with Bolivia: on December 17, 1878 Hilarión Daza had ordered the collection of the 10 cents tax and a few months later the War of the Pacific would begin after Bolivia's refusal to revert the measure that violated previous treaties with Chile.

Papón would be succeeded by his brother called Mulato in 1892, who ended up settling in a reserve in Chile, near Punta Arenas, until he died of smallpox in 1905.

=== Diplomatic negotiations prior to the Treaty of 1881 ===
Through historical maps it is possible to follow the course of the negotiations that led to the signing of the treaty. The Chilean maps show Argentine proposals of 1872, 1876 and 1879, as status quo between the two countries until the definitive boundary treaty was signed.

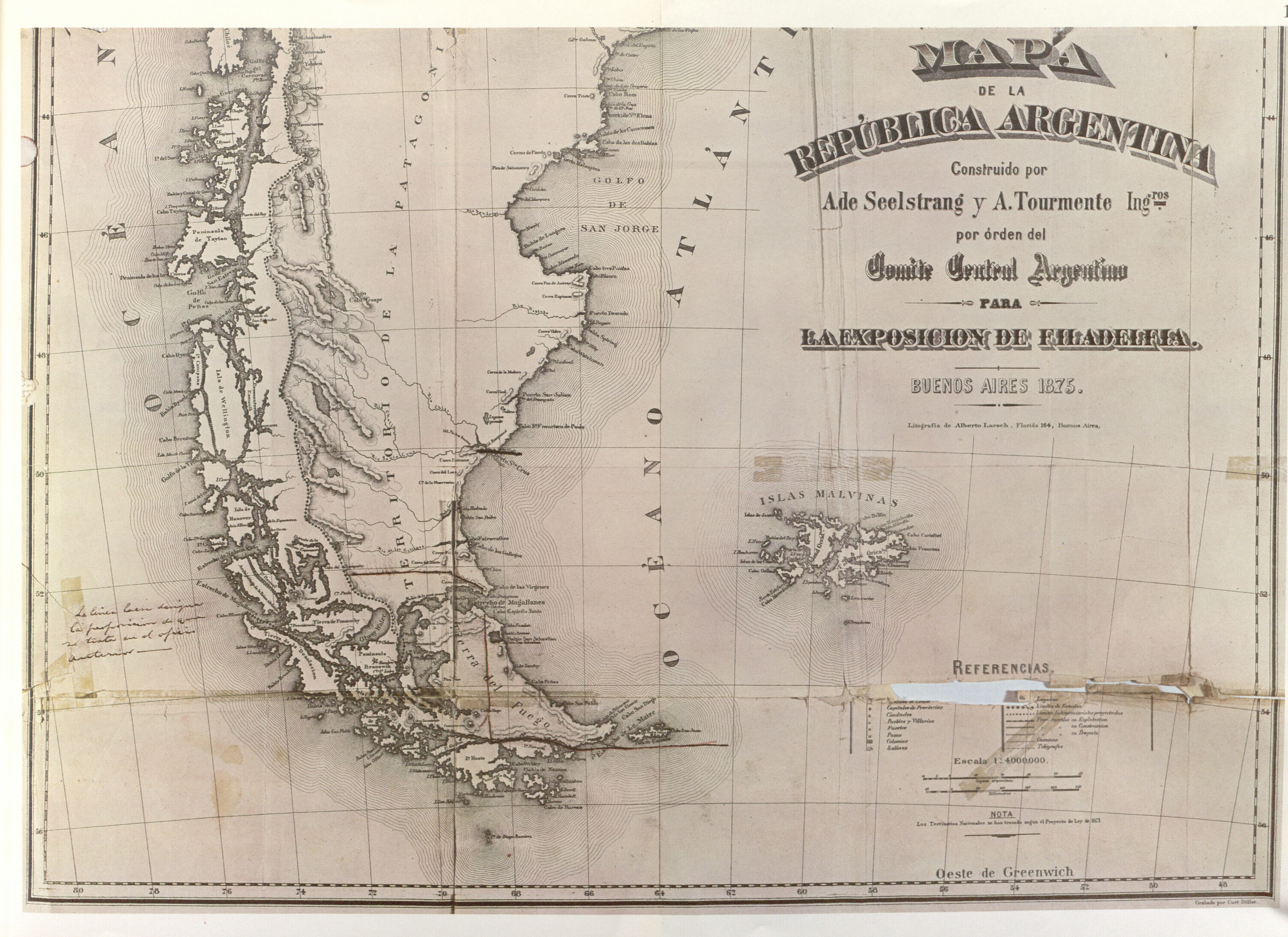
Argentine map made by Seelstrang and Tourmente in 1875 with a handwritten proposal of 1876.

Map of Seelstrang of 1875 On the right we can appreciate the Argentine map made by Seelstrang and Tourmente in 1875 that was used by the Chilean minister in Buenos Aires, Diego Barros, to communicate on July 10, 1876, to his government in Santiago a proposal for a solution from the Argentine foreign minister, Bernardo de Irigoyen, extended during the negotiations that preceded the signing of the 1881 Treaty of Limits. The proposal is drawn with a red line and is in fact very similar to what is today the boundary between the two countries.

The map illustrates the difficulty of demarcation due to the lack of knowledge of the area. The map does not show any natural feature to mark the border, with the exception of some hills: Cerro Moore near Puerto Natales and further north Cerro Cay in front of the Guaitecas Islands.

This Argentine map shows the Argentine interpretation of the 1856 Treaty marked as a line of crosses (++++). It can be seen that the border passes a few kilometers east of the Chilean city Punta Arenas and continues through the center of the Strait of Magellan towards the Pacific Ocean (northwest) leaving all the islands south of the Strait of Magellan as Argentine territory.

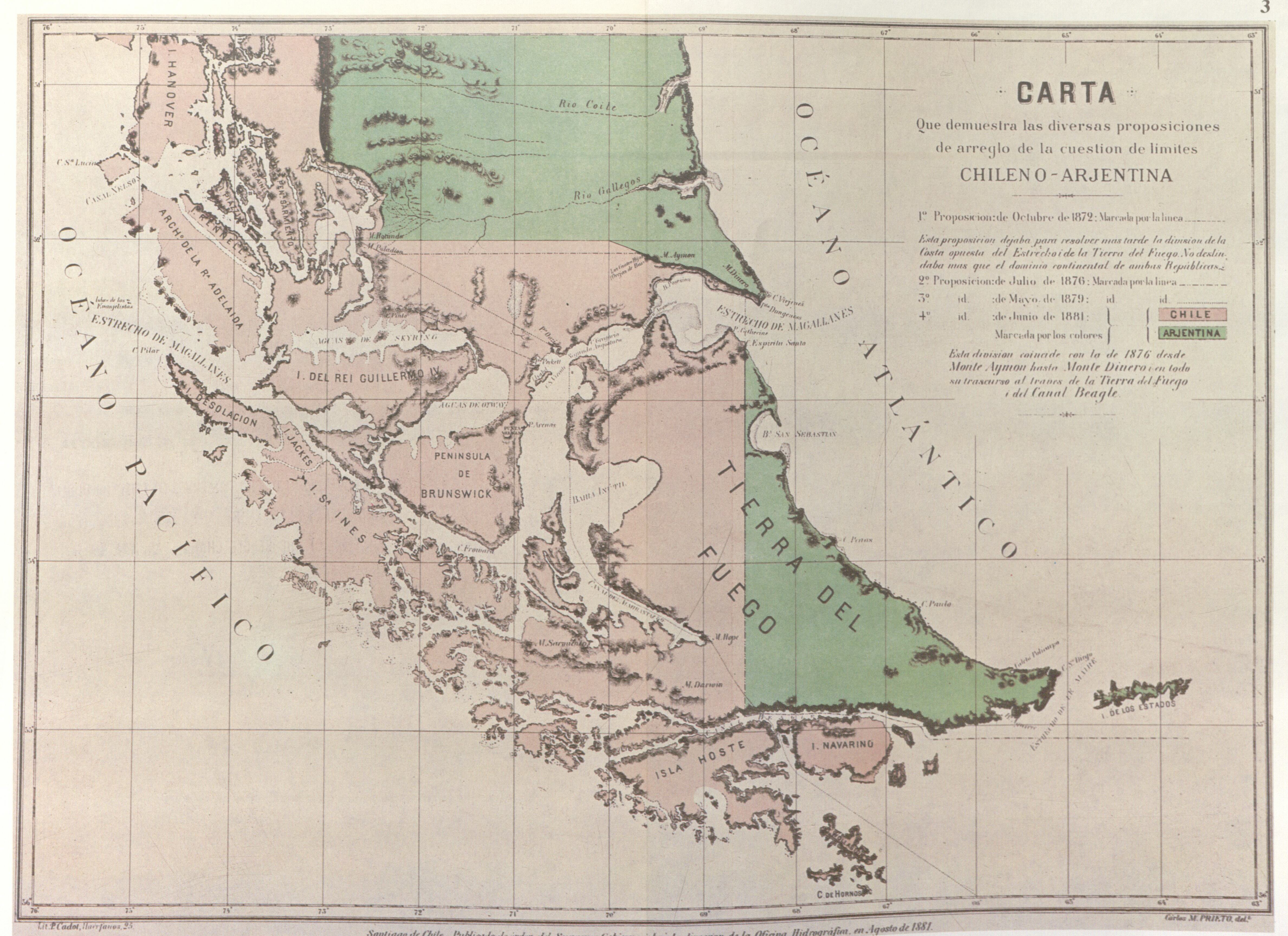
Chilean map made by Carlos Prieto, after the Treaty of 1881 showing the proposals of the status quo of 1872, 1876 and 1879

Map of Carlos Prieto The following map on the right was made by the engineer Carlos Prieto of the Oficina Hidrográfica de Chile and published by the Chilean government in 1881 to show the genesis and content of the 1881 Boundary Treaty. Three proposals and the final solution are indicated in it:

1. Proposal of October 1872 marked with "----". This proposal offered to define the common border only up to the northern shore of the strait, leaving the division of the territories to the south for the future. The strait would be shared between Chile and Argentina.
2. July 1876 proposal marked with "-...-...-..." which is the one we have seen on the Seelstrang and Tour map above. In Carlos Prieto's map it can be seen that in the 1876 proposal the border is not the 52nd parallel, as it is today, but somewhat further south, in favor of Argentina.
3. May 1879 proposal marked with a line "......". This delimited all the territories with a line that divided the strait east of Punta Arenas and divided the Isla Grande de Tierra del Fuego between Chile and Argentina by Bahía Inútil, Admiralty Channel crossing the Beagle Channel to continue along the Murray Channel. It left Navarino, Picton, Lennox and Nueva as Argentine territory. The islands Hoste Island, Wollaston Islands, Hornos Island, etc., as Chilean territory.

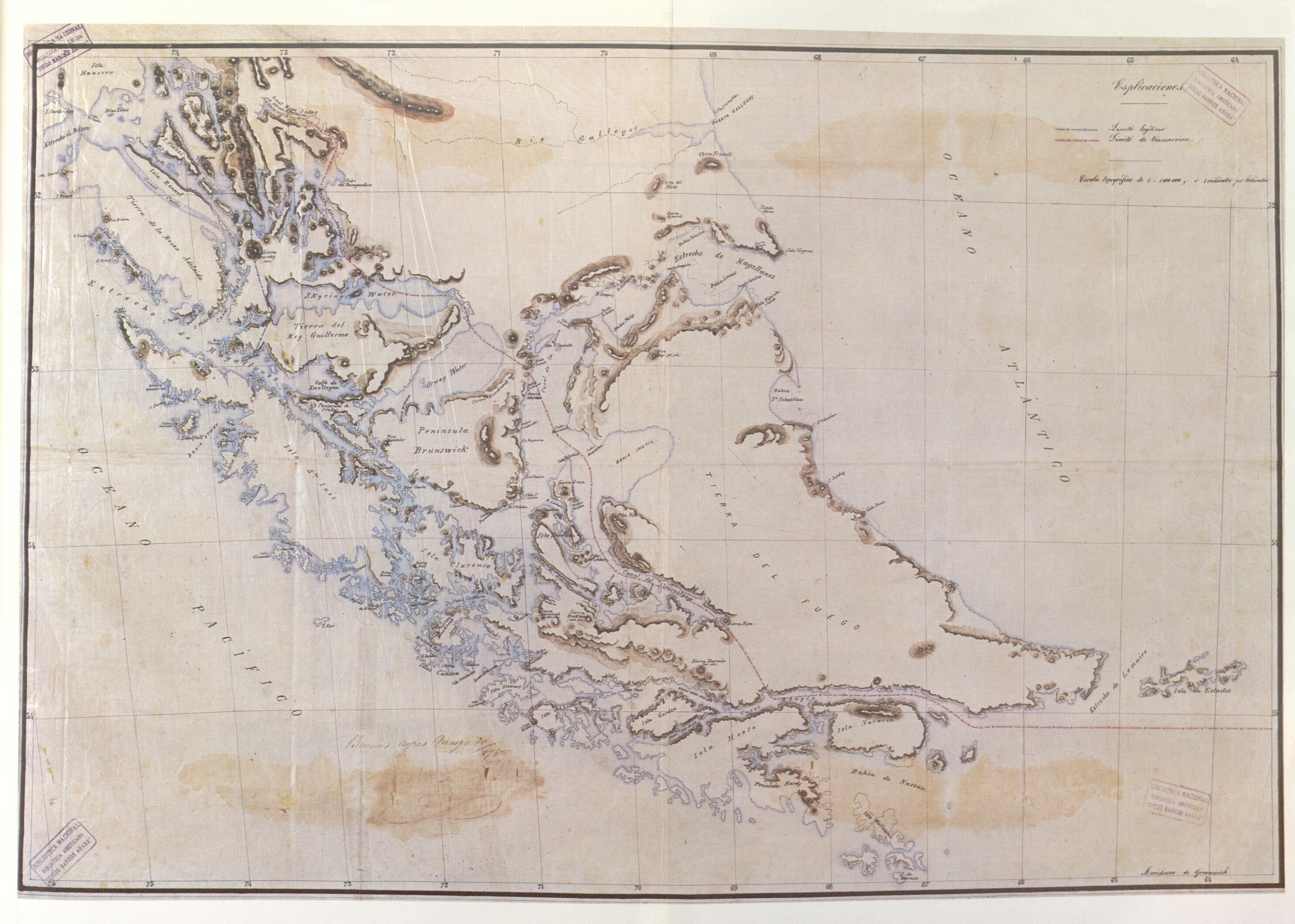
Proposición de Rufino de Elizalde de 1878.

Proposition by Rufino de Elizalde Another map that is related to the gestation of the Treaty of 1881 is that of the proposal of the Minister of Foreign Affairs of Argentina, Rufino de Elizalde of March 1878. This map bears the minister's signature and is in the National Library of Chile. The boundary offered passes largely through canals, like that of May 1879, but leaves all islands south of the Isla Grande de Tierra del Fuego under Chilean sovereignty. The "legitimate boundary" of the map, i.e., the Argentine interpretation of the 1856 Treaty, is drawn with a blue line and runs west of Punta Arenas, leaving Punta Arenas in Argentine territory.

Both Seelstrang and Tourmente's map (1875) and Rufino de Elizalde's map (1878) also show a point that would later be of fundamental importance in the Argentine argumentation during the Beagle conflict.

Argentina postulated the bioceanic principle, according to which the uti possidetis juris of 1810, agreed in the Treaty of Limits of 1856, prevented Argentina from possessing coasts in the Pacific, Argentina assumed that implicitly Chile could not possess coasts in the Atlantic. The oceanic thesis would be one of the pillars of the Argentine presentation before the Arbitral Court of 1977.

In both maps the Argentine interpretation of the Treaty of 1856 left Argentina in possession of extensive coasts in the Pacific Ocean in contradiction with that thesis.

=== Arturo Prat as a spy in Buenos Aires ===
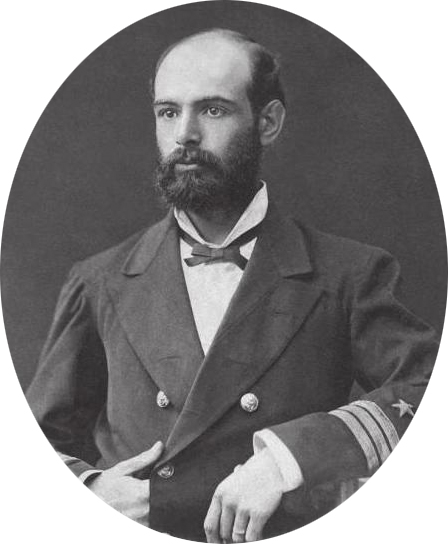
Prat with frigate captain uniform

In 1878 the now famous Chilean sailor, Arturo Prat, is sent to Buenos Aires as a spy and notes that the mood of the Argentine public was in favor of a war for Eastern Patagonia, as it was believed to be full of useful natural resources.

He was promoted to frigate captain on 25. By the end of the following year, and following the Argentine government's intentions to mark sovereignty in Patagonia, particularly in the Santa Cruz River, was commissioned for a few months by President Aníbal Pinto Garmendia to perform intelligence services in Uruguay and Argentina.

The purpose of your trip, Your Excellency told me, is to know if you are willing to go to Montevideo to find out what is being done in the Argentine Republic, in terms of armaments, military movements and all kinds of preparations that reveal a hostile character to Chile, since alarming telegrams are being received continuously, perhaps without real foundation, and what is desired is to know what is positive.

On 18 he arrived in Montevideo, where he introduced himself as a lawyer and writer, and stayed at the Hotel de la Paz. In December of the same year, he twice visited Buenos Aires, where he established contacts and met briefly with the president Nicolás Avellaneda. During his mission, he delivered a series of Argentine military and naval data requested by the Chilean government. He underestimated Argentina's effective military power, citing factors such as the impact of the economic crisis, the large number of foreigners and the inexperience of its sailors, but, at the same time, he warned about the accelerated preparations for war. On the possibility of conflict, he stated:

I am no friend of war, but I also believe that excessive love for peace can harm us more than war itself, enervating the country and making us lose the influence that for our tranquility and the good of America we should and can exercise in America and that we do not put into practice out of pure selfishness.

The mission was not to his liking, so he requested his return to Chile after completing the essentials of his mission; on 28 he received authorization to return to Chile, and landed in Valparaíso in mid-February.

=== Treaty of 1881, the basis of the present boundaries ===
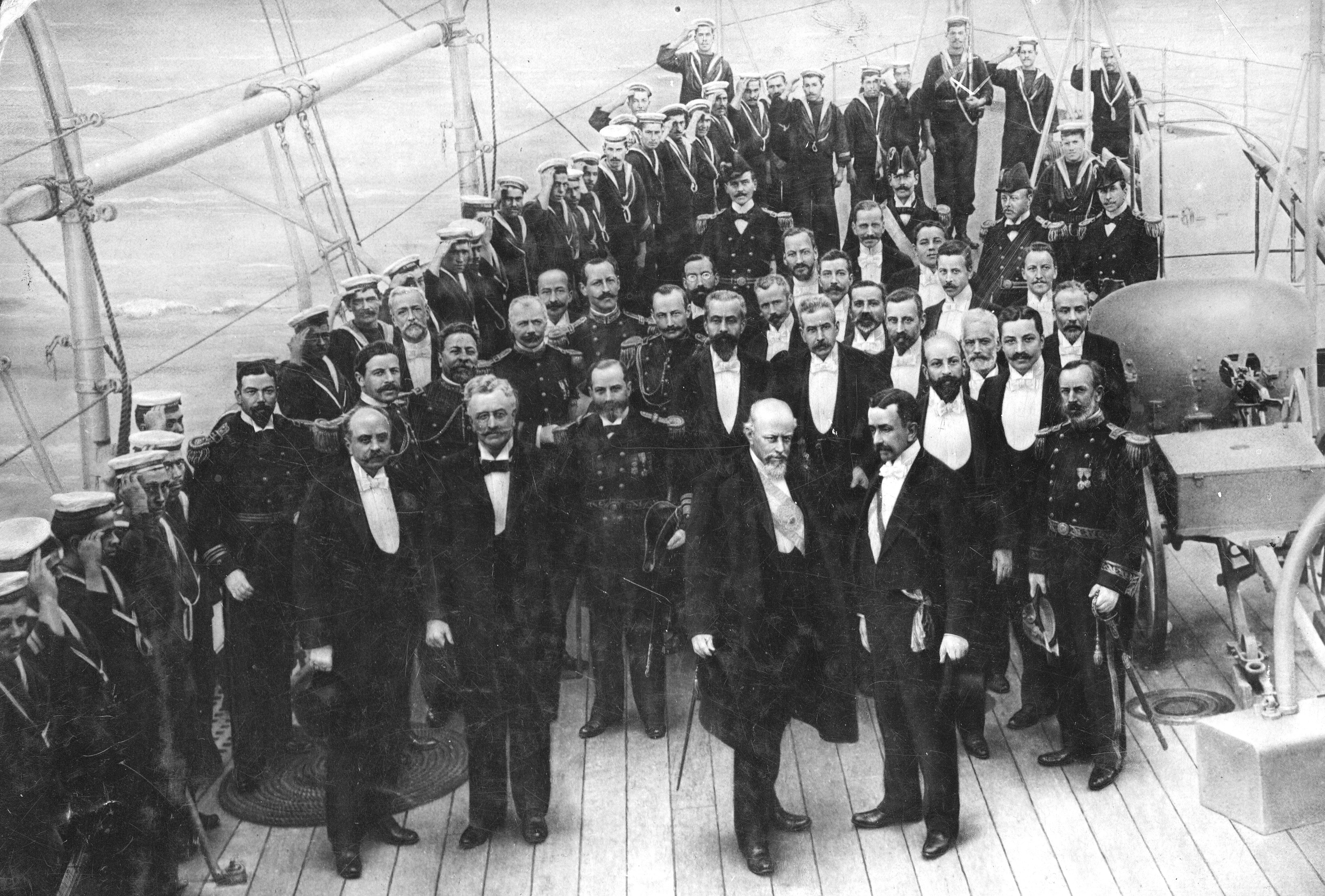
Meeting of presidents Roca and Errázuriz, when the hug of the Strait of 1899 took place, which symbolized the acceptance of the border fixed in 1881, after years of border tension in the area

The boundary treaty would be carried out between both disputing countries in the year 1881, with later corrections. These treaties ended much of the Southern Patagonia dispute, Argentina finally recognizing Chilean sovereignty over the entire Strait of Magellan, while Chile recognizes Argentine sovereignty over the Patagonian coasts north of the latter and the eastern portion of Isla Grande de Tierra del Fuego.

The Treaty fixes the border at the highest peaks and the watershed to the 52° parallel.

Chile in 1881 was fighting in the War of the Pacific against Peru and Bolivia, and with the treaty it also prevented Argentina from joining the alliance of its northern neighbors.

Argentina previously in 1878 created the governorship of Patagonia, later, in 1884, the Law of National Territories (law 1532) is sanctioned, thus emerging the Patagonian territories with their own names: Neuquén, Río Negro, Chubut, Santa Cruz and Tierra del Fuego.

For its part, Chile created in 1853 the Magallanes territory, covering all the territory claimed in Southern Patagonia, being diminished after the treaty of 1881. In 1929 the subdivision became the province of Magallanes.

In 1893 both countries signed a Border protocol, affecting the border line in the Isla Grande de Tierra del Fuego and in 1902 the pactos de Mayo were signed based on new differences arising from the treaty of 1881, resulting in a Border Arbitral award that same year. This stopped the Argentine–Chilean naval arms race. Subsequently, differences continued to arise over the international boundary.

== Legal discussion ==
During the boundary dispute, manuscripts from the Hispanic period—preserved in archives and libraries across both the Americas and Europe—began to circulate as instruments of legal support. In this context, territorial claims were legitimized through the ability to demonstrate a legal foundation behind them. For this reason, various authors, diplomats, and historians dedicated themselves diligently to collecting documents, analyzing them, and formulating interpretations aimed at defending the interests of their respective countries. The main author in favor of Chile was Miguel Luis Amunátegui and the main one in favor of Argentina was Vicente Gregorio Quesada. However, many of these official texts were subject to divergent readings or even contradicted one another, generating overlaps and interpretive disputes. For the Chilean position, many of those official texts were subject to divergent readings or even contradicted one another, generating overlaps and interpretive disputes, agreeing that the Patagonian territory south of the Diamante River (the southern limit of the jurisdiction of Cuyo transferred to the new Viceroyalty of the Río de la Plata) remained within Chilean jurisdiction in 1810. In the Argentine position, there were different interpretations regarding the jurisdiction to which Patagonia belonged: de Angelis attributed it to Cuyo, Juan Martín Leguizamón to the bishopric and province of Tucumán, and Quesada along with other authors to Buenos Aires. All agreed that the legal and governmental documents alluded to the eastern Patagonia being within the jurisdiction of the Viceroyalty of the Río de la Plata.

The historian Pablo Lacoste acknowledges the existence of contradictory reports from Spanish royal officials, with some having the "perception of the Andes mountain range as the eastern limit of Chile," compiling those precedents in a table that includes the document made by Francisco Hurtado in 1784 and others by Ambrosio O'Higgins, while among the precedents assigning Atlantic coast to the governorship of Chile under the "approach of Patagonia as part of the Kingdom of Chile" are the book by Manuel de Amat y Junyent from 1761, the travel diary of Luis de la Cruz, and the "geographical and historical dictionary of America" by Antonio Alcedo from 1786. However, Lacoste asserts that the documents expressing that the Andes are the eastern limit of Chile are qualitatively and quantitatively of greater weight than those expressing that eastern Patagonia forms part of the Kingdom of Chile. Nevertheless, Manuel Ravest Mora disagrees with his conclusions and interpretation of the documents, leaning in favor of the thesis that eastern Patagonia formed part of the Kingdom of Chile in 1810.

=== Argentina ===
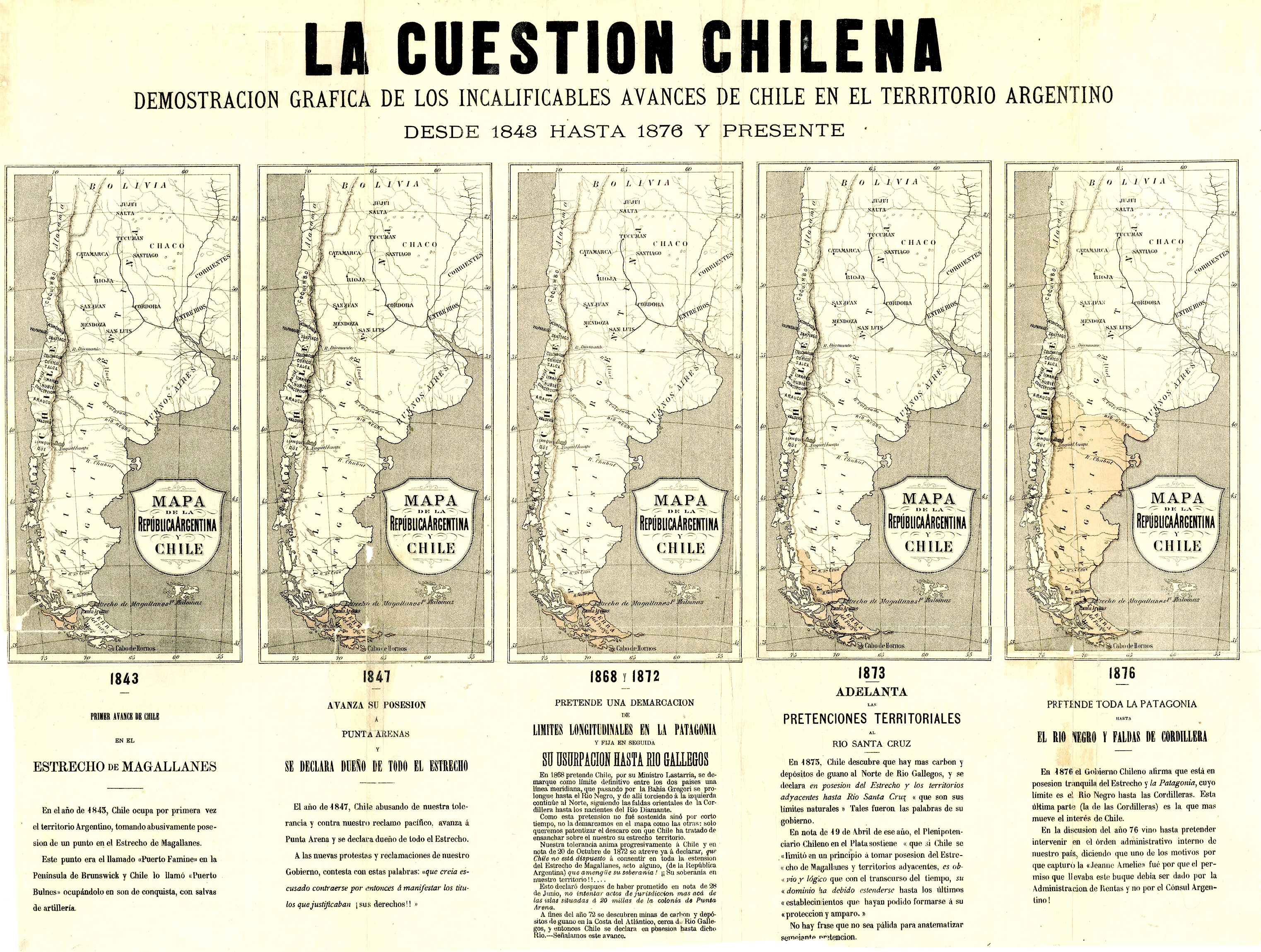
Maps showing the Argentine position, considering Chile's occupation of Southern Patagonia as an usurpation

Argentina never laid claim to Western Patagonia during the 19th-century dispute; an Argentine map published in the magazine La Ilustración Argentina states: "The archipelago west of Tierra del Fuego (shown in black and white) has always been under the unquestionable sovereignty of Chile".

Map of Patagonia by F. A. Garnier, 1862, where we read the following clarification in French: "This vast country depended on the former Viceroyalty of Buenos Aires; and, to this title, it is still claimed today by the Argentine Republic".

The Argentine jurist Dalmacio Vélez Sarsfield, once stated that Eastern Patagonia inherently belonged to the corregimiento de Cuyo during the Spanish empire, a region that was expressly transferred by the Crown to the newly created viceroyalty of La Plata, in 1776. Something only affirmed by him and not by other Argentines such as Pedro de Angelis who stipulated that the region depended on Buenos Aires or Bernardo de Irigoyen. According to the documents of the founding of Mendoza, Cuyo reached only as far as the Diamante River to the south.

The Junta de Poblaciones del Reino de Chile in an order of September 20, 1752 pointed out the limits corresponding to the corregimiento de Cuyo:

Chapter I – First of all, beginning with the easternmost part of the Kingdom, which is the vast Province of Cuyo, which shares terms with those of Tucuman and Rio de la Plata and Magellanic lands, and is divided to the west by the great snowy mountain range, by virtue of what was determined on May 12, 1745, in Chapter 12 of the General Assembly of f. 68, first book, and in attention to the greater need and precision that the Lords of this, particularly the most illustrious Bishop in his (...)

Domingo Faustino Sarmiento, exiled in Chile, raised the possibility that Chile could possess the whole of Patagonia saying:

It remains to be determined whether the title of the Viceroyalty of Buenos Aires expresses that the lands to the South of Mendoza, and still possessed by Chilean citizens, entered into the demarcation of the Viceroyalty. If not, Chile could claim all the territory between Magallanes and the provinces of Cuyo.

The Argentine politician Juan Bautista Alberdi said:

For example, as an Argentine, if I were the undisputed owner of those three deserts [Patagonia, Strait and Tierra del Fuego], I would give most of them to Chile, in the interest of my country itself, not because my country is less beloved than Chile. I would give them free to Chile because Chile needs them more than we do, since its territory is smaller; it is more capable of populating and civilizing them than we are, as is being shown by the fact of exploring them, colonizing them, making them useful for Humanity in general." (...) "The Argentine interest is not in being the nominal and abstract owner of those deserts, but in those deserts ceasing to be so or being populated by our civilized race, which is that of Chile, instead of being populated by savage Indians, who are the scourge of our campaigns. Occupied, populated, civilized, enriched those territories, today deserted and savage, by Chileans, who are our brothers, we would have rich and civilized neighbors, instead of the poor, thieving and savage neighbors we have today.

— Juan Bautista Alberdi

Later in the 20th century Argentine authors would argue that all territory south of the Biobío River would have belonged to the rioplatense jurisdiction by the mere fact of the impossibility of being occupied by the Spaniards for the most part.

=== Chile ===
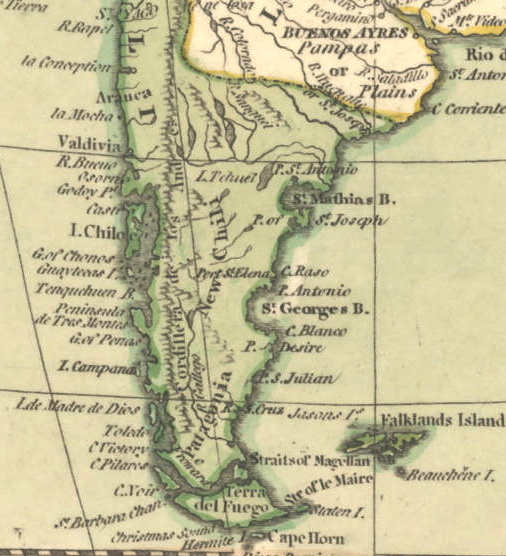
Map of 1808 showing the entire Patagonia within Chilean territorial jurisdiction.

In Chile during the 19th century, intellectuals such as Miguel Luis Amunátegui with his book "Historia de las Fronteras de Chile", the 20 volumes of "Historia de Chile desde la prehistoria hasta 1891", by Francisco Antonio Encina and "Estudio histórico sobre el descubrimiento y conquista de la Patagonia y de la Tierra del Fuego" by Carlos Morla Vicuña, argued that the whole of Patagonia, including the Eastern, belonged by right to Chile based on documents from the time of the Spanish empire.

Prior to Amunátegui's report on Chile's historical rights over East Patagonia, and despite the knowledge of these by Bernardo O'Higgins, already exiled in Peru, in The Constitution of 1833 defined the border in the mountain range, reflecting the eastern border of "Old Chile", being extended to the South (Chile Antiguo in the Spanish Crown Documents), however, in 1843 Chile renounced such border previously defined by the political class when founding Fort Bulnes in the eastern part of the Strait of Magellan. The 1856 treaty, which was essentially a trade agreement, was interpreted by the Chilean government as the renunciation of the border of the Constitution of 1833 in favor of the border considered as historical uti possidetis juris described in the Hispanic documents revealed by Amunátegui which included "Modern Chile" (Chile Moderno in the Spanish Crown Documents) in addition to "Old Chile", therefore, all the Patagonian region.

=== Res nullius ===
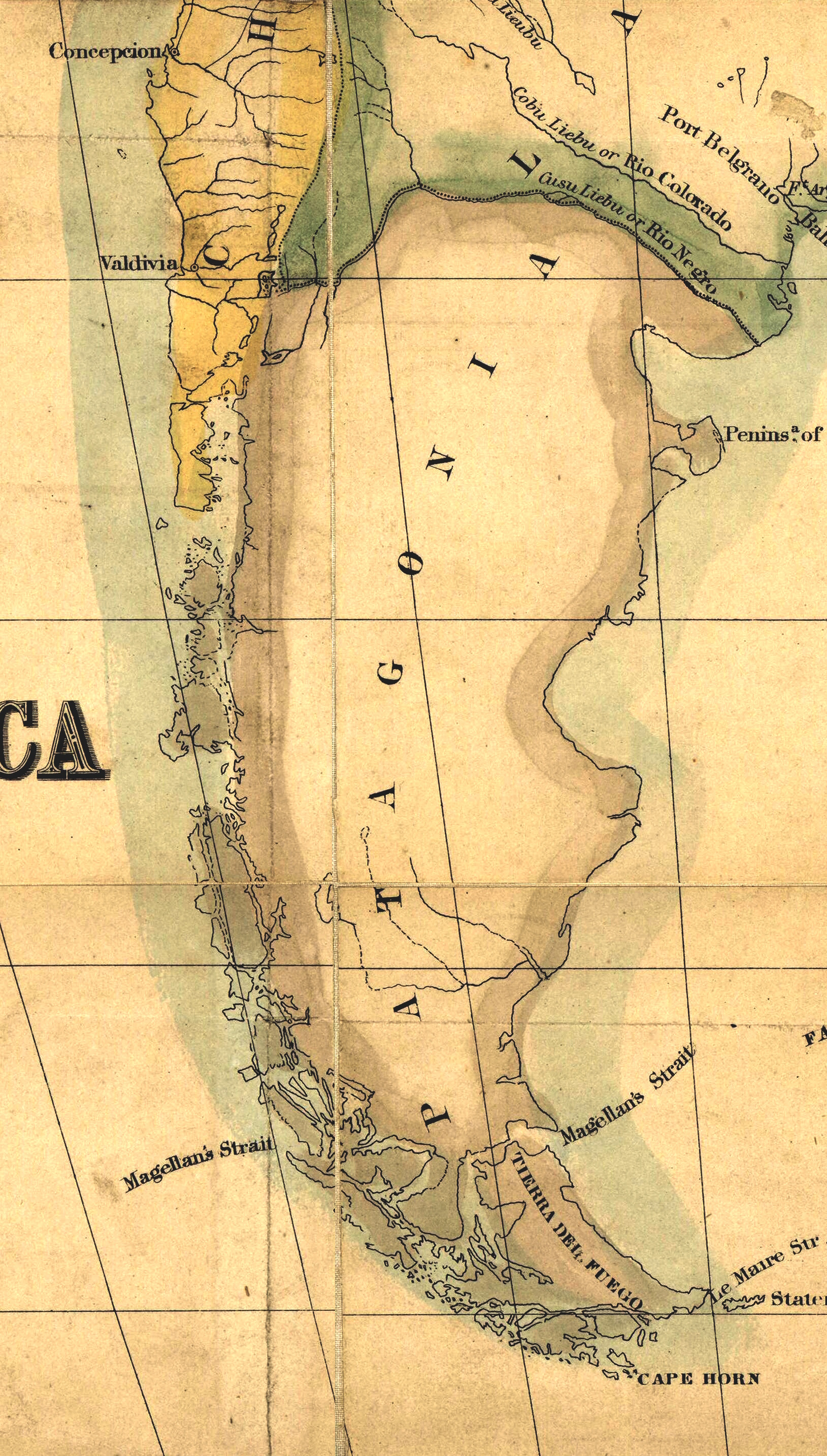
Map from 1854 by G. Philip showing Patagonia as separate from both Chile and Argentina.

There is a position that states that the region did not belong to any of the countries since it was not largely occupied by Spain and the territory would not have been delimited, however, similar to the case of the Peruvian Amazon, the region was indeed claimed de jure by Spain.

Foreign maps show Patagonia as res nullius, defying the Spanish claim or later that of the South American republics.

== See also ==
- Southern Patagonian Ice Field dispute
- Boundary Treaty of 1881 between Chile and Argentina
- Argentine–Chilean naval arms race
- Diego Barros Arana
- Adolfo Ibáñez Gutiérrez
- Vicente Pérez Rosales
- Carlos Morla Vicuña
- Mexican–American War
- Falkland Islands sovereignty dispute
- Atacama Desert border dispute
- Beagle conflict
