= Patagonia =

Geographical region in South America

- Region
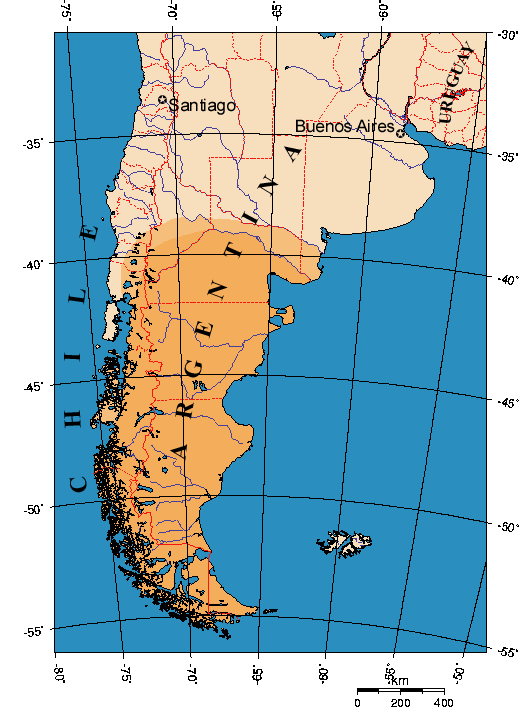
- Continent: South America
- Country: Argentina; Chile
- Provinces of Argentina: Neuquén; Río Negro; Chubut; Santa Cruz; Tierra del Fuego
- Regions of Chile: Los Lagos; Palena; Aysén; Magallanes
- Largest city: Neuquén

Area
  - Total: 1,043,076 km^{2} (402,734 sq mi)

Population
  - Total: 1,999,540
  - Density: 1.91696/km^{2} (4.96492/sq mi)
- Demonym: Patagonian

Demographics
  - Languages: Spanish (official)

Patagonia (Spanish pronunciation: [pataˈɣonja]) is a geographical region that encompasses the southern end of South America, governed by Argentina and Chile. The region comprises the southern section of the Andes mountains, featuring lakes, fjords, temperate rainforests, and glaciers in the west, and deserts, tablelands, and steppes to the east. Patagonia is bounded by the Pacific Ocean on the west, the Atlantic Ocean to the east, and many bodies of water that connect them, including the Strait of Magellan, the Beagle Channel, and the Drake Passage to the south.

The northern limit of the region is not precisely defined. The Colorado and Barrancas rivers, which run from the Andes to the Atlantic, are commonly considered the northern limit of Argentine Patagonia. On this basis, the extent of Patagonia could be defined as the provinces of Neuquén, Río Negro, Chubut and Santa Cruz, along with Patagones Partido in the far south of Buenos Aires Province. Most geographers and historians locate the northern limit of Chilean Patagonia at the Huincul Fault in the Araucanía Region, extending across the Los Lagos Region, Magallanes Region and Aysén Region. The archipelago of Tierra del Fuego is also frequently included as part of Patagonia.

At the time of the Spanish arrival, Patagonia was inhabited by multiple indigenous groups. Communities in a small portion of northwestern Patagonia practiced limited agriculture, while most other peoples lived as hunter-gatherers. These groups traveled on foot in the eastern plains and used dugout canoes and dalcas in the western fjords and channels. During the colonial period, indigenous groups in northeastern Patagonia adopted a horseback-based nomadic lifestyle after the reintroduction of the horse. Following independence, Chile and Argentina asserted sovereignty over the region, initiating a period of colonization in the 19th and early 20th centuries. This expansion, coupled with military campaigns, severely disrupted indigenous societies and led to a sharp population decline as immigrants settled the area from mainland Chile, the Chiloé Archipelago, Argentina, and Europe.

Today, the economy of Argentine Patagonia relies heavily on sheep farming and the extraction of oil and natural gas. In Chilean Patagonia, economic activity is dominated by fishing, salmon aquaculture, and tourism.

== Etymology and toponomies ==
The name Patagonia comes from the word patagón. Magellan used this term in 1520 to describe the native tribes of the region, whom his expedition thought to be giants. The people he called the Patagons are now believed to have been the Tehuelche, who tended to be taller than Europeans of the time. Argentine researcher Miguel Doura observed that the name Patagonia possibly derives from the ancient Greek region of modern Turkey called Paphlagonia, possible home of the patagon personage in the chivalric romances Primaleon printed in 1512, ten years before Magellan arrived in these southern lands. This hypothesis was published in a 2011 New Review of Spanish Philology report.

There are various placenames in the Chiloé Archipelago with Chono etymologies despite the main indigenous language of the archipelago at the arrival of the Spanish being Mapudungun. A theory postulated by chronicler José Pérez García explains this holding that the Cuncos (also known as Veliches) settled in Chiloé Island in Pre-Hispanic times as a consequence of a push from more northern Huilliches who in turn were being displaced by Mapuches. While being outside traditional Huilliche territory the western Patagonian volcanoes Michimahuida, Hornopirén and Chaitén have Huilliche etymologies.

In Chubut Province modern toponymy comes from the word "chupat" belonging to a transitional language between the southern and northern Tehuelche ethnic groups that were located in that region called Tewsün or Teushen. The word means transparency and is related to the clarity and purity of the river that bears that name and runs through the province. It is also related to the origin of the Welsh pronunciation of the word "chupat" which later became "Chubut". It is called "Camwy" in Patagonian Welsh. Chupat, Chubut and Camwy have the same meaning and are used to talk about the river and the province. Welsh settlers and placenames are associated with one of the projects of the country of Wales, Project Hiraeth.

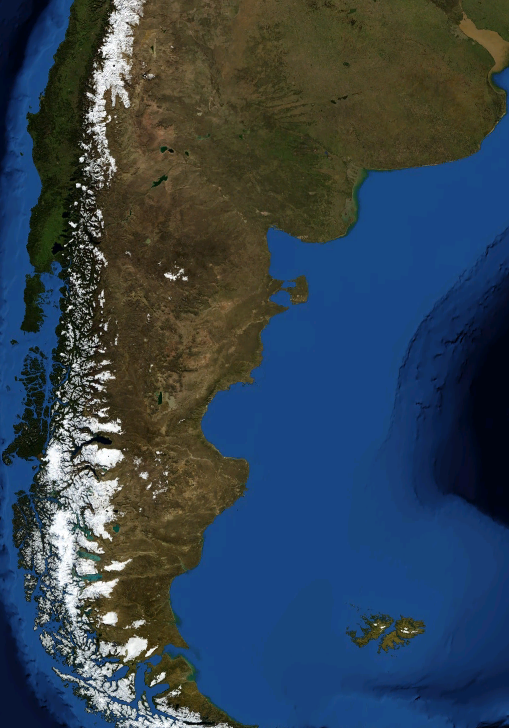
Patagonia

Due to the language, culture and location, many Patagonians do not consider themselves Latinos and proudly call themselves Patagonians instead. People from Y Wladfa, Laurie Island, the Atlantic Islands, Antarctica (including the Chilean town in Antarctica, "The Stars Village", and the Argentine civilian settlement, "Hope Base"), other non-Latin speaking areas use this term as a patriotic and inclusive demonym. A Patagonian is a person that is part of the Patagonia region, language and culture. That person could be a citizen from Chilean Patagonia, Argentine Patagonia, or of native communities that existed before the land was divided by The Boundary Treaty of 1881.

Patagonia is divided between Western Patagonia (Chile) and Eastern Patagonia (Argentina) and several territories are still under dispute and claiming their rights. Mapuche people came from the Chilean Andes and voted to remain in different sides of Patagonia. Welsh settlers came from Wales and North America and voted to remain in Patagonia; when the treaty was signed, they voted for culture and administration to be apart from the country keeping the settlement, language, schools, traditions, regional dates, flag, anthems, and celebrations. Patagonians also live abroad in settlements like Saltcoats, Saskatchewan, Canada; New South Wales, Australia; South Africa; the Falkland Islands; and North America.

== Population and land area ==
=== Argentine Patagonia ===
Eastern Patagonia consists of five Argentine provinces, together with a single partido (the most southern division) of Buenos Aires Province, all listed below with their areas and their populations at the censuses of 15 May 1991, 17 November 2000, 27 October 2010 and 16 May 2022:

Name	Capital	Area (km^{2})	Census 1991	Census 2000	Census 2010	Census 2022
Tierra del Fuego Province	Ushuaia	21,571	69,369	101,079	127,205	185,732
Santa Cruz Province	Río Gallegos	243,943	159,839	196,958	273,964	337,226
Chubut Province	Rawson	224,686	357,189	413,237	509,108	592,621
Neuquén Province	Neuquén	94,078	388,833	474,155	551,266	710,814
Río Negro Province	Viedma	203,013	506,772	552,822	638,645	750,768
Patagones Partido (of Buenos Aires Province)	Carmen de Patagones	13,600	27,469	27,938	30,207	37,646
Totals		800,891	1,479,471	1,766,189	2,130,395	2,614,807

=== Chilean Patagonia ===
Western Patagonia at its greatest definition consists of four Chilean regions, all listed below with their areas and their populations at the Censuses of 22 April 1992, 24 April 2002, 19 April 2017 and 9 March 2024: On a more limited definition, Chilean Patagonia comprises just the two more southern and least populated regions (Zona Austral) of Aysén and Magallanes.

Name	Capital	Area (km^{2})	Census 1991	Census 2000	Census 2010	Census 2022
Los Ríos Region	Valdivia	18,430	328,479	354,271	384,837	398,230
Los Lagos Region	Puerto Montt	48,584	616,682	712,039	828,708	890,284
Aysén Region ^{(a)}	Coihaique	108,494	78,666	89,986	103,158	100,745
Magallanes Region ^{(b)}	Punta Arenas	132,297	141,818	147,533	166,533	166,537
Totals		307,805	1,165,645	1,303,829	1,483,236	1,555,796

Notes: (a) official name is Aysén del General Carlos Ibáñez del Campo. (b) official name is Magallanes y de la Antártica Chilena,

=== Largest cities ===
The populations of Argentine cities and agglomerations are from the 2022 Census as referenced above. The populations of Chilean cities and agglomerations are from the 2017 Census as referenced above.

City	Population of city	Population of agglomeration	Province / Region	Country
Neuquén	287,787	500,336 ^{(a)}	Neuquén Province	Argentina
Puerto Montt	245,909		Los Lagos Region	Chile
Comodoro Rivadavia	201,854		Chubut Province	Argentina
Valdivia	182,086		Los Ríos Region	Chile
Osorno	171,455		Los Lagos Region	Chile
Punta Arenas	148,391		Magallanes Region	Chile
San Carlos de Bariloche	134,978		Río Negro Province	Argentina
Río Gallegos	115,524		Santa Cruz Province	Argentina
Trelew	104,657		Chubut Province	Argentina
General Roca	102,750		Río Negro Province	Argentina
Puerto Madryn	97,625		Chubut Province	Argentina
Río Grande	97,611		Tierra del Fuego Province	Argentina
Cipolletti	95,524	500,336 ^{(a)}	Río Negro Province	Argentina
Ushuaia	79,409		Tierra del Fuego Province	Argentina
Viedma	57,341	83,323	Río Negro Province	Argentina
Caleta Olivia	56,310		Santa Cruz Province	Argentina
Plottier	52,291	500,336 ^{(a)}	Neuquén Province	Argentina
Coyhaique	49,968		Aysén Region	Chile
Cutral Có	40,305	56,225	Neuquén Province	Argentina
Esquel	36,624		Chubut Province	Argentina

Note: (a) the Neuquén – Plottier – Cipolletti Metropolitan area.

== Physical geography ==
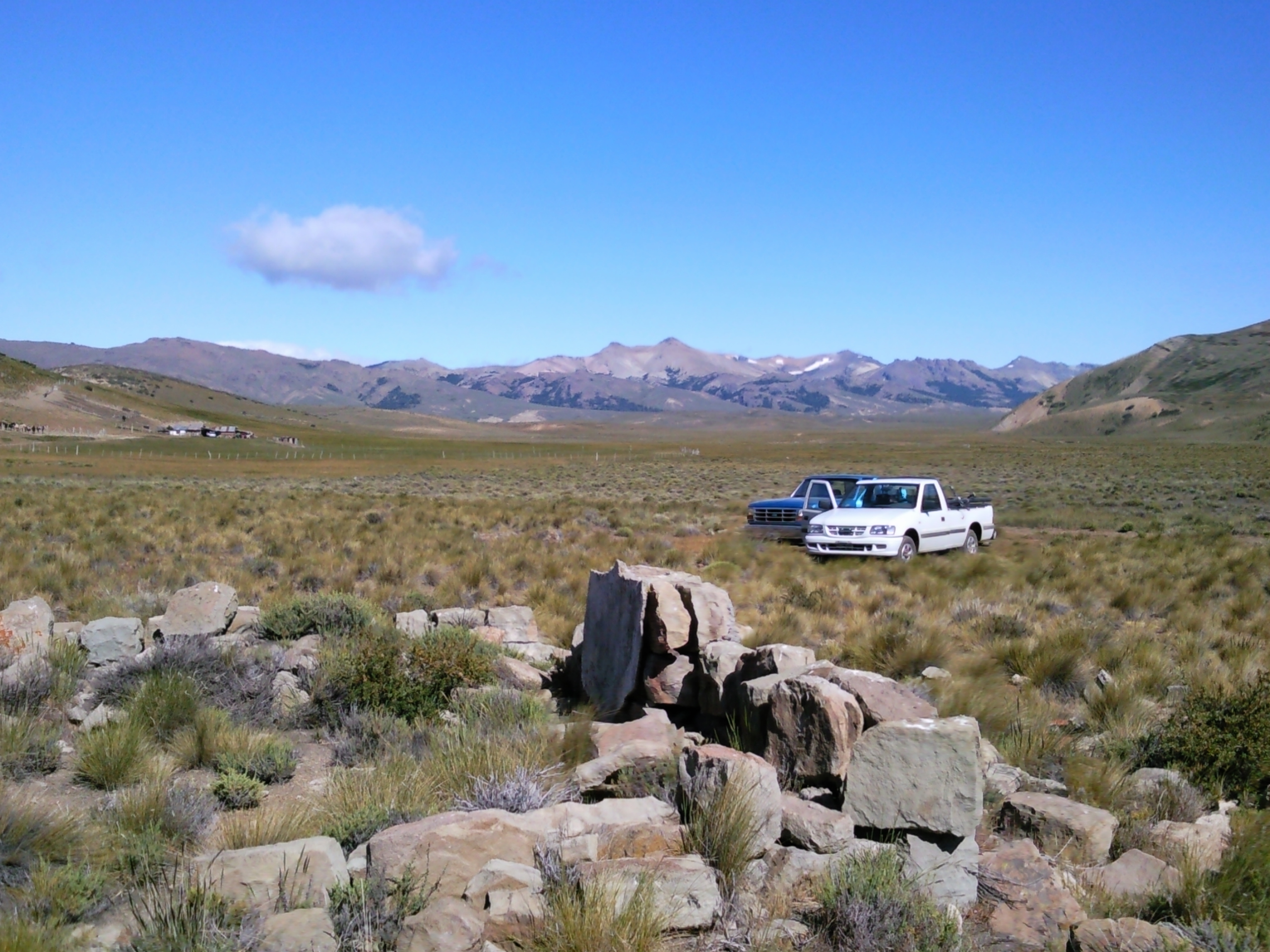
Río Negro Province, Argentina

Argentine Patagonia is for the most part a region of steppe-like plains, rising in a succession of 13 abrupt terraces about 100 m (330 ft) at a time, and covered with an enormous bed of shingle almost bare of vegetation. In the hollows of the plains are ponds or lakes of fresh and brackish water. Towards Chilean territory, the shingle gives way to porphyry, granite, and basalt lavas, and animal life becomes more abundant. Vegetation is more luxuriant, consisting principally of southern beech and conifers. The high rainfall against the western Andes (Wet Andes) and the low sea-surface temperatures offshore give rise to cold and humid air masses, contributing to the ice fields and glaciers, the largest ice fields in the Southern Hemisphere outside of Antarctica.

Across much of Patagonia east of the Andes, volcanic eruptions have created formation of basaltic lava plateaus during the Cenozoic. The plateaus are of different ages with the older –of Neogene and Paleogene age– being located at higher elevations than Pleistocene and Holocene lava plateaus and outcrops.

Among the depressions by which the plateau is intersected transversely, the principal ones are the Gualichu, south of the Río Negro, the Maquinchao and Valcheta (through which previously flowed the waters of Nahuel Huapi Lake, which now feed the Limay River), the Senguerr (spelled Senguer on most Argentine maps and within the corresponding region), and the Deseado River. Besides these transverse depressions (some of them marking lines of ancient interoceanic communication, see marine transgression in the next section), others were occupied by either more or less extensive lakes, such as the Yagagtoo, Musters, and Colhue Huapi, and others situated to the south of Puerto Deseado in the center of the country.

Erosion, which is caused principally by the sudden melting and retreat of ice aided by tectonic changes, has scooped out a deep longitudinal depression, best in evidence where in contact with folded Cretaceous rocks, which are lifted up by the Cenozoic granite. It generally separates the plateau from the first lofty hills, whose ridges are generally called the pre-Cordillera. To the west of these, a similar longitudinal depression extends all along the foot of the snowy Andean Cordillera. This latter depression contains the richest, most fertile land of Patagonia. Lake basins along the Cordillera were also gradually excavated by ice streams, including Lake Argentino and Lake Fagnano, as well as coastal bays such as Bahía Inútil.

The establishment of dams near the Andes in Argentina in the 20th century has led to a sediment shortage along the Atlantic coast of Patagonia.

=== Geology ===
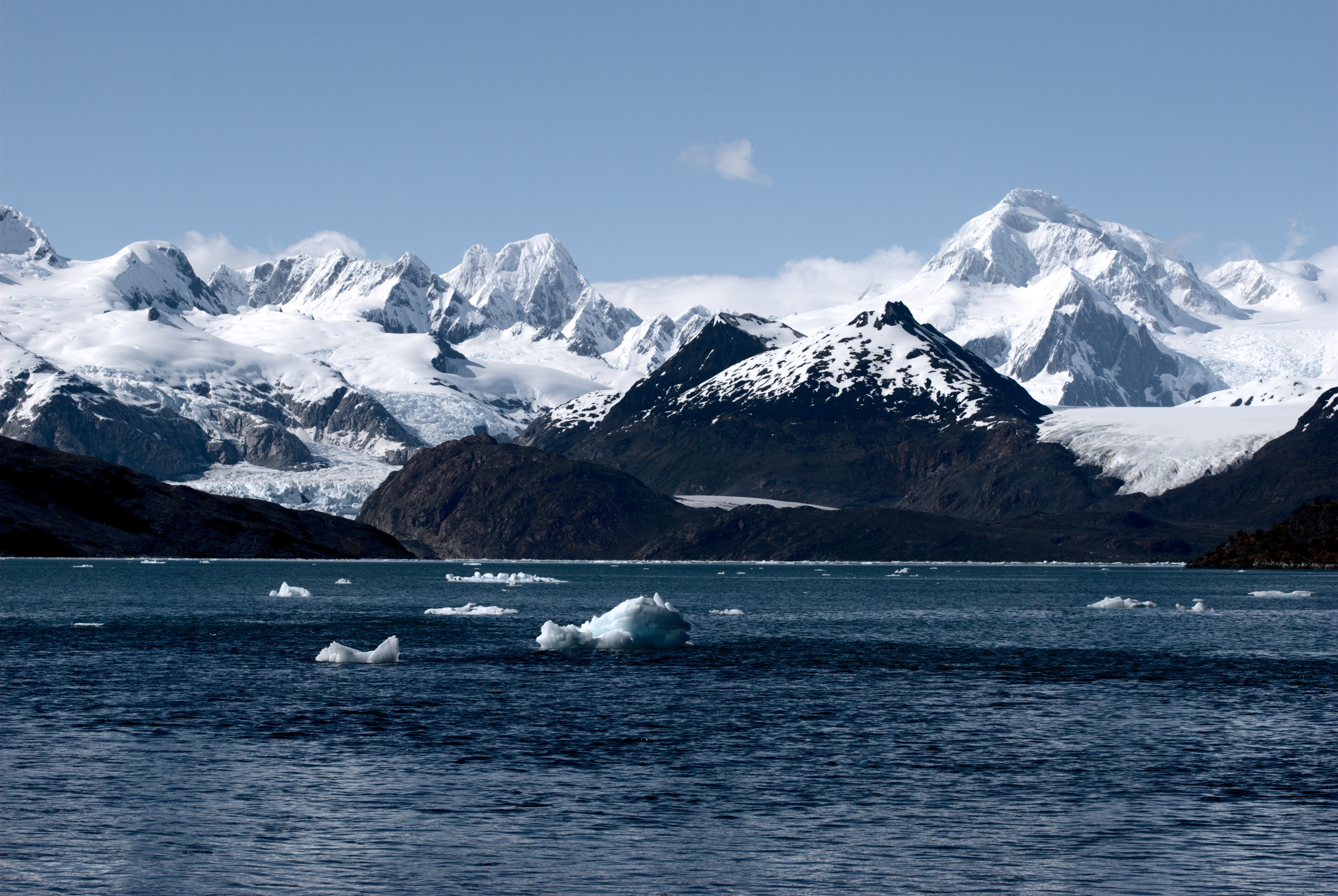
Ainsworth Bay and Marinelli Glacier, Chile

The geological limit of Patagonia has been proposed to be Huincul Fault, which forms a major discontinuity. The fault truncates various structures including the Pampean orogen found further north. The ages of base rocks change abruptly across the fault. Discrepancies have been mentioned among geologists on the origin of the Patagonian landmass. Víctor Ramos has proposed that the Patagonian landmass originated as an allochthonous terrane that separated from Antarctica and docked in South America 250 to 270 Mya in the Permian period. A 2014 study by R.J. Pankhurst and coworkers rejects any idea of a far-traveled Patagonia, claiming it is likely of parautochtonous (nearby) origin.

The Mesozoic and Cenozoic deposits have revealed a most interesting vertebrate fauna. This, together with the discovery of the perfect cranium of a turtle (chelonian) of the genus Niolamia, which is almost identical to Ninjemys oweni of the Pleistocene age in Queensland, forms an evident proof of the connection between the Australian and South American continents. The Patagonian Niolamia belongs to the Sarmienti Formation. Fossils of the mid-Cretaceous Argentinosaurus, which may be the largest of all dinosaurs, have been found in Patagonia, and a model of the mid-Jurassic Piatnitzkysaurus graces the concourse of the Trelew airport (the skeleton is in the Trelew paleontological museum; the museum's staff has also announced the discovery of a species of dinosaur even bigger than Argentinosaurus). Of more than paleontological interest, the middle Jurassic Los Molles Formation and the still richer late Jurassic (Tithonian) and early Cretaceous (Berriasian) Vaca Muerta formation above it in the Neuquén basin are reported to contain huge hydrocarbon reserves (mostly gas in Los Molles, both gas and oil in Vaca Muerta) partly accessible through hydraulic fracturing. Other specimens of the interesting fauna of Patagonia, belonging to the Middle Cenozoic, are the gigantic wingless birds, exceeding in size any hitherto known, and the singular mammal Pyrotherium, also of very large dimensions. In the Cenozoic marine formation, considerable numbers of cetaceans have been discovered.

During the Oligocene and early Miocene, large swathes of Patagonia were subject to a marine transgression, which might have temporarily linked the Pacific and Atlantic Oceans, as inferred from the findings of marine invertebrate fossils of both Atlantic and Pacific affinity in La Cascada Formation. Connection would have occurred through narrow epicontinental seaways that formed channels in a dissected topography. The Antarctic Plate started to subduct beneath South America 14 million years ago in the Miocene, forming the Chile Triple Junction. At first, the Antarctic Plate subducted only in the southernmost tip of Patagonia, meaning that the Chile Triple Junction was located near the Strait of Magellan. As the southern part of the Nazca Plate and the Chile Rise became consumed by subduction, the more northerly regions of the Antarctic Plate began to subduct beneath Patagonia so that the Chile Triple Junction advanced to the north over time. The asthenospheric window associated to the triple junction disturbed previous patterns of mantle convection beneath Patagonia inducing an uplift of c. 1 km that reversed the Miocene transgression.

== Political divisions ==
Official boundaries of Chilean Patagonia

At a state level, Patagonia visually occupies an area within two countries: approximately 10% in Chile and approximately 90% in Argentina. Both countries have organized their Patagonian territories into nonequivalent administrative subdivisions: provinces and departments in Argentina, as well as regions, provinces, and communes in Chile. As Chile is a unitary state, its first-level administrative divisions—the regions—enjoy far less autonomy than analogous Argentine provinces. Argentine provinces have elected governors and legislatures, while Chilean regions had government-appointed intendants prior to the adoption of elected governors from 2021.

The Patagonian Provinces of Argentina are Neuquén, Río Negro, Chubut, Santa Cruz, and Tierra del Fuego. The southernmost part of Buenos Aires Province can also be considered part of Patagonia.

The two Chilean regions undisputedly located entirely within Patagonia are Aysén and Magallanes. Palena Province, a part of the Los Lagos Region, is also located within Patagonia. By some definitions, Chiloé Archipelago, the rest of the Los Lagos Region, and part of the Los Ríos Region are also part of Patagonia.

== Climate ==
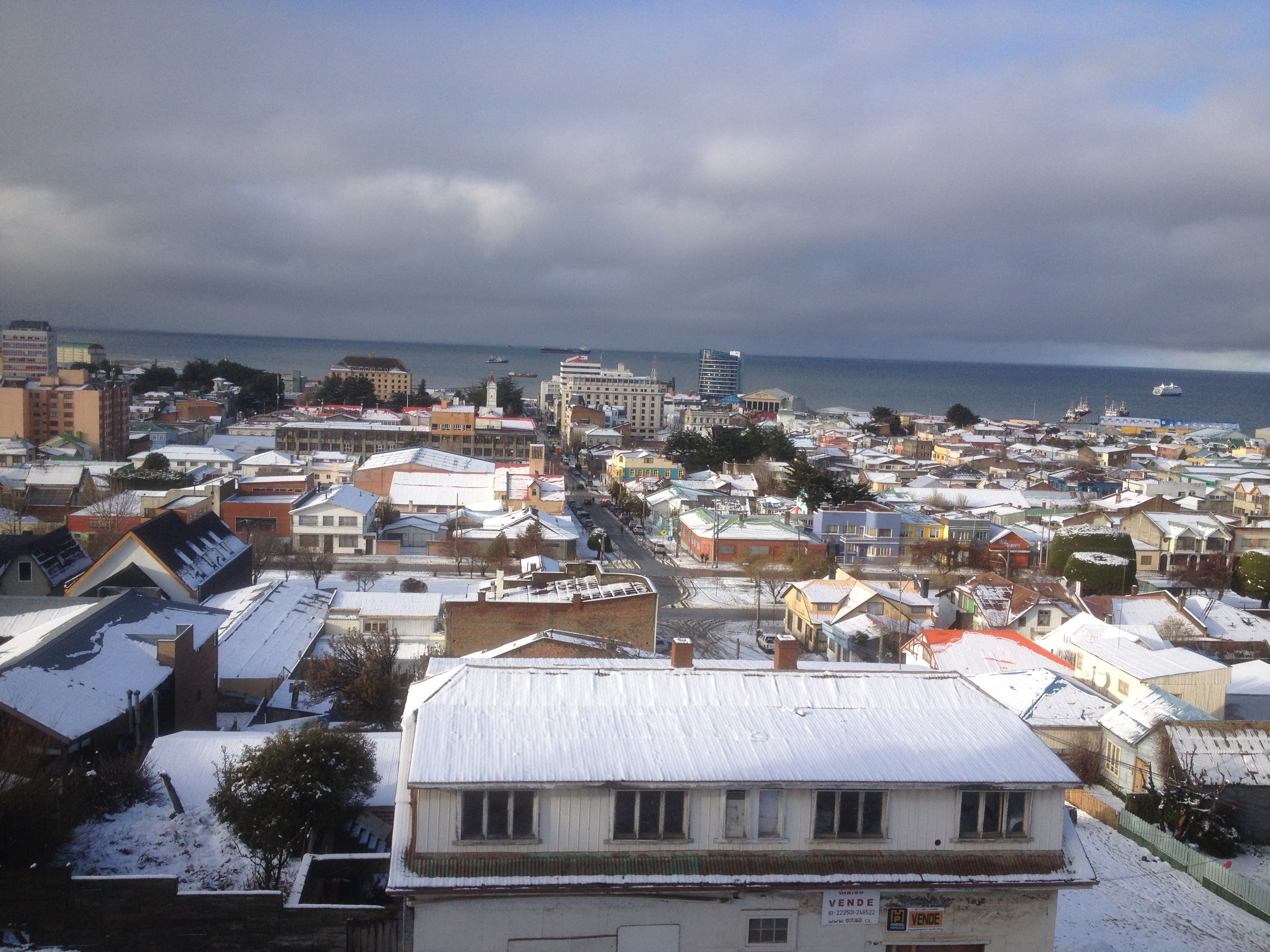
View of Punta Arenas, Chile, in winter

Patagonia's climate is mostly cool and dry year round. The east coast is warmer than the west, especially in summer, as a branch of the southern equatorial current reaches its shores, whereas the west coast is washed by a cold current. However, winters are colder on the inland plateaus east of the slopes and further down the coast on the southeast end of the Patagonian region. For example, at Puerto Montt, on the inlet behind Chiloé Island, the mean annual temperature is 11 °C (52 °F) and the average extremes are 25.5 and −1.5 °C (77.9 and 29.3 °F), whereas at Bahía Blanca near the Atlantic coast and just outside the northern confines of Patagonia, the annual temperature is 15 °C (59 °F) and the range much greater, as temperatures above 35 °C (95 °F) and below −5 °C (23 °F) are recorded every year. At Punta Arenas in Chile, in the extreme south, the mean temperature is 6 °C (43 °F) and the average extremes are 24.5 and −2 °C (76.1 and 28.4 °F). The prevailing winds are westerly, and the westward slope has a much heavier precipitation than the eastern in a rainshadow effect; the western islands close to Torres del Paine receive an annual precipitation of 4,000 to 7,000 mm (157.5 to 275.6 in), while the eastern hills have less than 800 mm (31.5 in) and the plains have as little as 200 mm (7.9 in) of annual precipitation.

Precipitation is highly seasonal in northwestern Patagonia. For example, Villa La Angostura in Argentina, close to the border with Chile, receives up to 434 mm (17.1 in) of rain and snow in May, 297 mm (11.7 in) in June, and 273 mm (10.7 in) in July, compared to 80 mm (3.1 in) in February and 72 mm (2.8 in) in March. The total for the city is 2,074 mm (81.7 in), making it one of the rainiest in Argentina. Farther west, some areas receive 4,000 mm (157.5 in) and more, especially on the Chilean side. In the northeast, the seasons for rain are reversed; most rain falls from occasional summer thunderstorms but totals barely reach 500 mm (19.7 in) in the northeast corner, and decrease rapidly to less than 300 mm (11.8 in). The Patagonian west coast, which belongs exclusively to Chile, has a cool oceanic climate, with summer maximum temperatures ranging from 14 °C (57 °F) in the south to 19 °C (66 °F) in the north and nights between 5 and 11 °C (41 and 52 °F), and very high precipitation, from 2,000 mm (78.7 in) to more than 7,000 mm (275.6 in) in local microclimates. Snow is uncommon at the coast in the north but happens more often in the south, and frost is usually not very intense.

Immediately east of the coast are the Andes, cut by deep fjords in the south and by deep lakes in the north, and with varying temperatures according to the altitude. The tree line ranges from close to 2,000 metres (6,600 ft) on the northern side (except for the Andes in northern Neuquén in Argentina, where sunnier and dryer conditions allow trees to grow up to close to 3,000 metres (9,800 ft)), and diminishes southward to only 600 to 800 metres (2,000 to 2,600 ft) in Tierra del Fuego. Precipitation changes dramatically from one spot to the other and diminishes very quickly eastward. An example of this is Laguna Frías, in Argentina, which receives 4,400 mm (173.2 in) yearly. The city of Bariloche, about 40 kilometres (25 mi) further east, receives about 1,000 mm (39.4 in), and the airport, another 15 kilometres (9.3 mi) east, receives less than 600 mm (23.6 in). The easterly slopes of the Andes are home to several Argentine cities: San Martín de los Andes, Bariloche, El Bolsón, Esquel, and El Calafate. Temperatures there are milder in the summer (in the north, between 20 and 24 °C (68 and 75 °F), with cold nights between 4 and 9 °C (39 and 48 °F); in the south, summers are between 16 and 20 °C (61 and 68 °F), at night temperatures are similar to the north) and much colder in the winter, with frequent snowfall (although snow cover rarely lasts very long). Daytime highs range from 3 to 9 °C (37 to 48 °F) in the north, and from 0 to 7 °C (32 to 45 °F) in the south, whereas nights range from −5 to 2 °C (23 to 36 °F) everywhere. Cold waves can bring much colder values; a temperature of −25 °C (−13 °F) has been recorded in Bariloche, and most places can often have temperatures between −15 and −12 °C (5 and 10 °F) and highs staying around 0 °C (32 °F) for a few days.

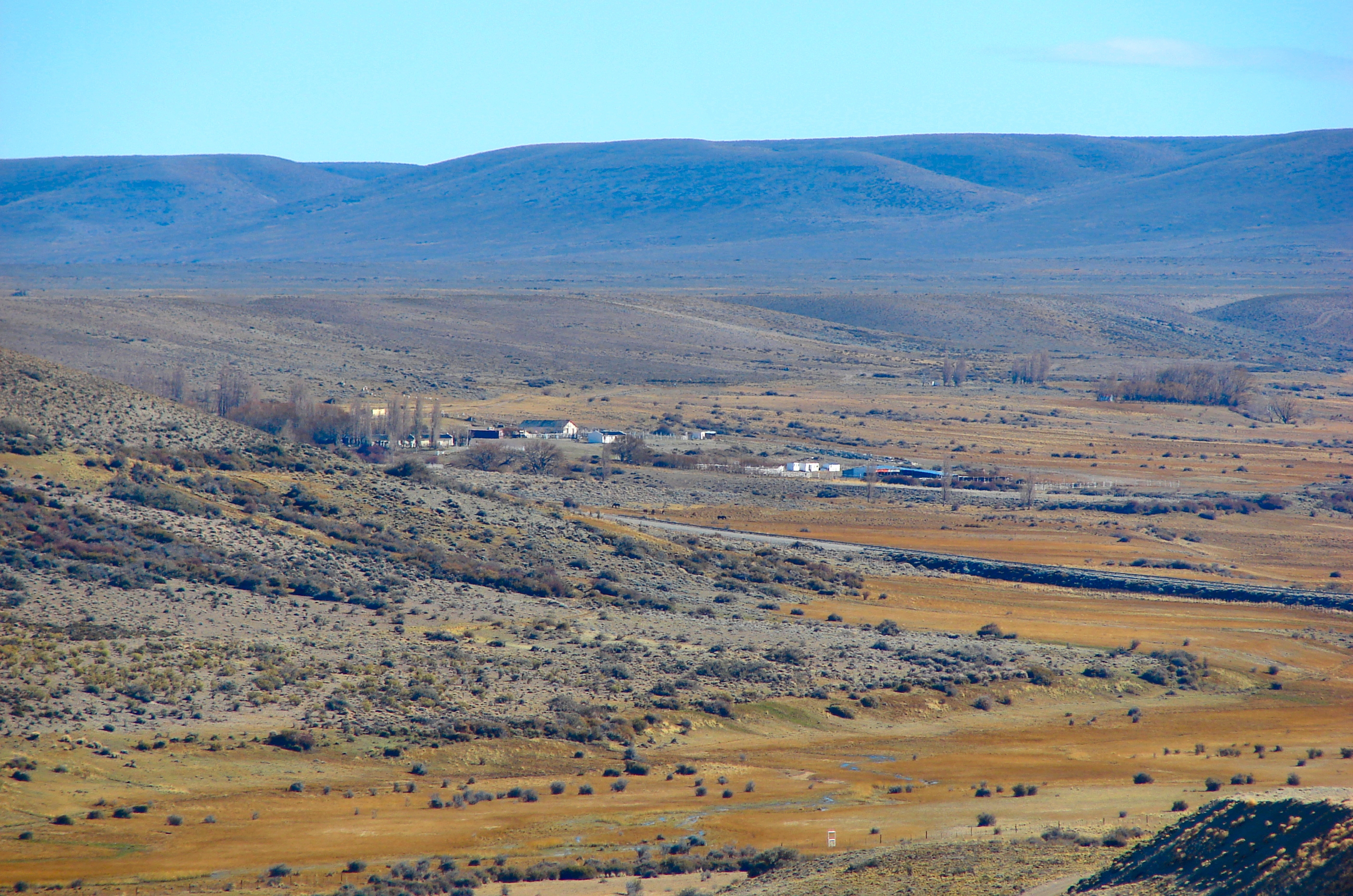
Santa Cruz Province

Directly east of these areas, the weather becomes much harsher; precipitation drops to between 150 and 300 millimetres (6 and 10 in), the mountains no longer protect the cities from the wind, and temperatures become more extreme. Maquinchao is a few hundred kilometers east of Bariloche, at the same altitude on a plateau, and summer daytime temperatures are usually about 5 °C (9 °F) warmer, rising up to 35 °C (95 °F) sometimes, but winter temperatures are much more extreme: the record is −35 °C (−31 °F), and some nights not uncommonly are 10 °C (18 °F) colder than in Bariloche. The plateaus in Santa Cruz province and parts of Chubut usually have snow cover through the winter, and often experience very cold temperatures. In Chile, the city of Balmaceda is known for being situated in this region (which is otherwise almost exclusively in Argentina), and for being the coldest place in Chile. In 2017, temperatures even dropped down to −20 °C (−4 °F) in the region.

The northern Atlantic coast has warm summers (28 to 32 °C (82 to 90 °F), but with relatively cool nights at 15 °C (59 °F)) and mild winters, with highs around 12 °C (54 °F) and lows of about 2 to 3 °C (36 to 37 °F). Occasionally, temperatures have reached as low as −10 °C (14 °F) and as high as 40 °C (104 °F), and rainfall is very scarce. The weather only gets a bit colder further south in Chubut, and the city of Comodoro Rivadavia has summer temperatures of 24 to 28 °C (75 to 82 °F), nights of 12 to 16 °C (54 to 61 °F), and winters with days around 10 °C (50 °F) and nights around 3 °C (37 °F), and less than 250 millimetres (10 in) of rain. However, a drastic drop occurs as one moves south to Santa Cruz; Rio Gallegos, in the south of the province, has summer temperatures of 17 to 21 °C (63 to 70 °F) with nights between 6 and 10 °C (43 and 50 °F) and winter temperatures of 2 to 6 °C (36 to 43 °F) with nights between −5 and 0 °C (23 and 32 °F), despite being right on the coast. Snowfall is common despite the dryness, and temperatures are known to fall to under −18 °C (0 °F) and to remain below 0 °C (32 °F) for several days in a row. Rio Gallegos is also among the windiest places on Earth, with winds reaching 100 kilometres per hour (62 mph) occasionally.

Tierra del Fuego is extremely wet in the west, relatively damp in the south, and dry in the north and east. Summers are cool (13 to 18 °C (55 to 64 °F) in the north, 12 to 16 °C (54 to 61 °F) in the south, with nights generally between 3 and 8 °C (37 and 46 °F)), cloudy in the south, and very windy. Winters are dark and cold, but without the extreme temperatures in the south and west (Ushuaia rarely reaches −10 °C (14 °F), but hovers around 0 °C (32 °F) for several months, and snow can be heavy). In the east and north, winters are much more severe, with cold snaps bringing temperatures down to −20 °C (−4 °F) all the way to the Rio Grande on the Atlantic coast. Snow can fall even in the summer in most areas, as well.

== Fauna ==
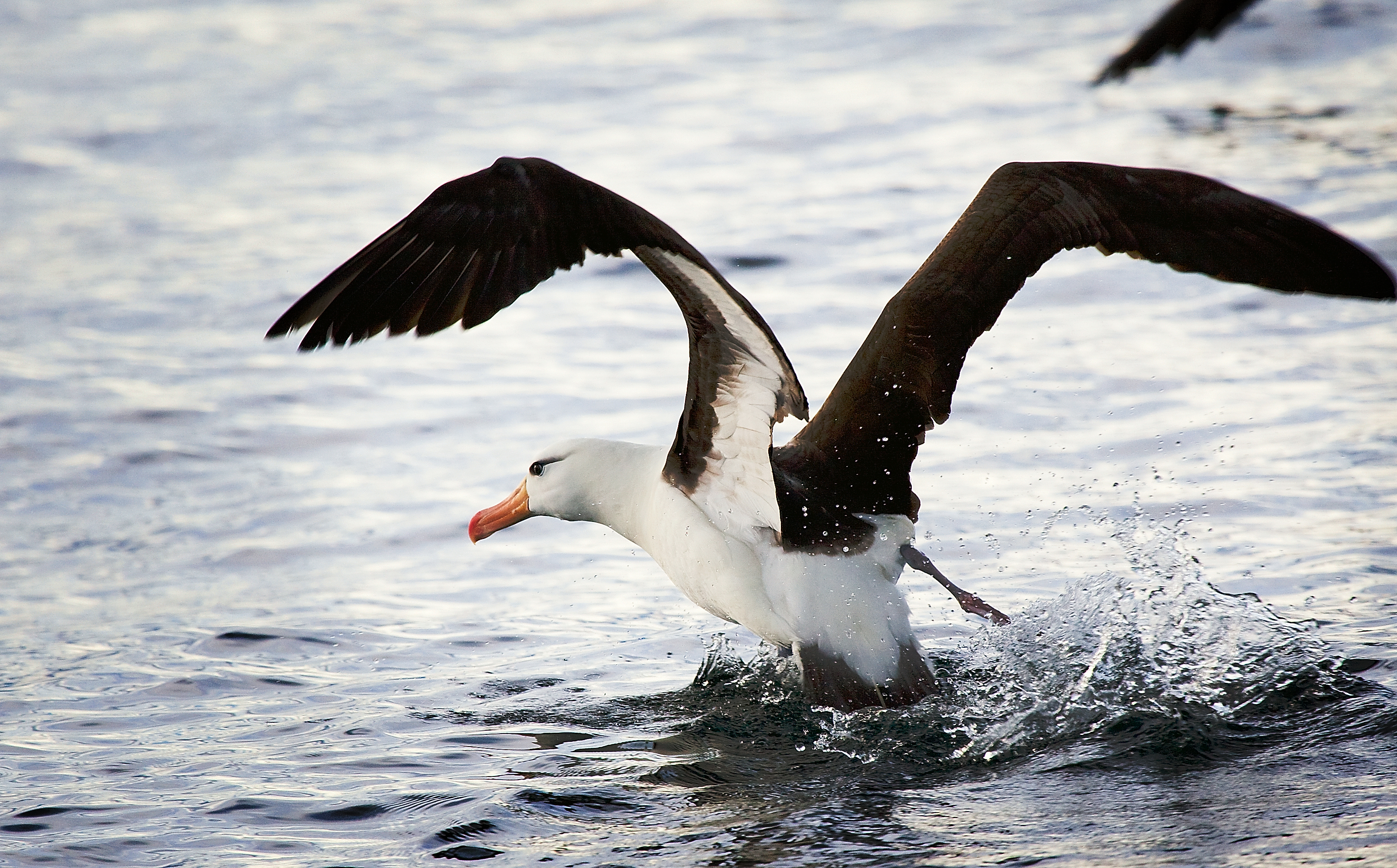
Black-browed albatross, near Ushuaia

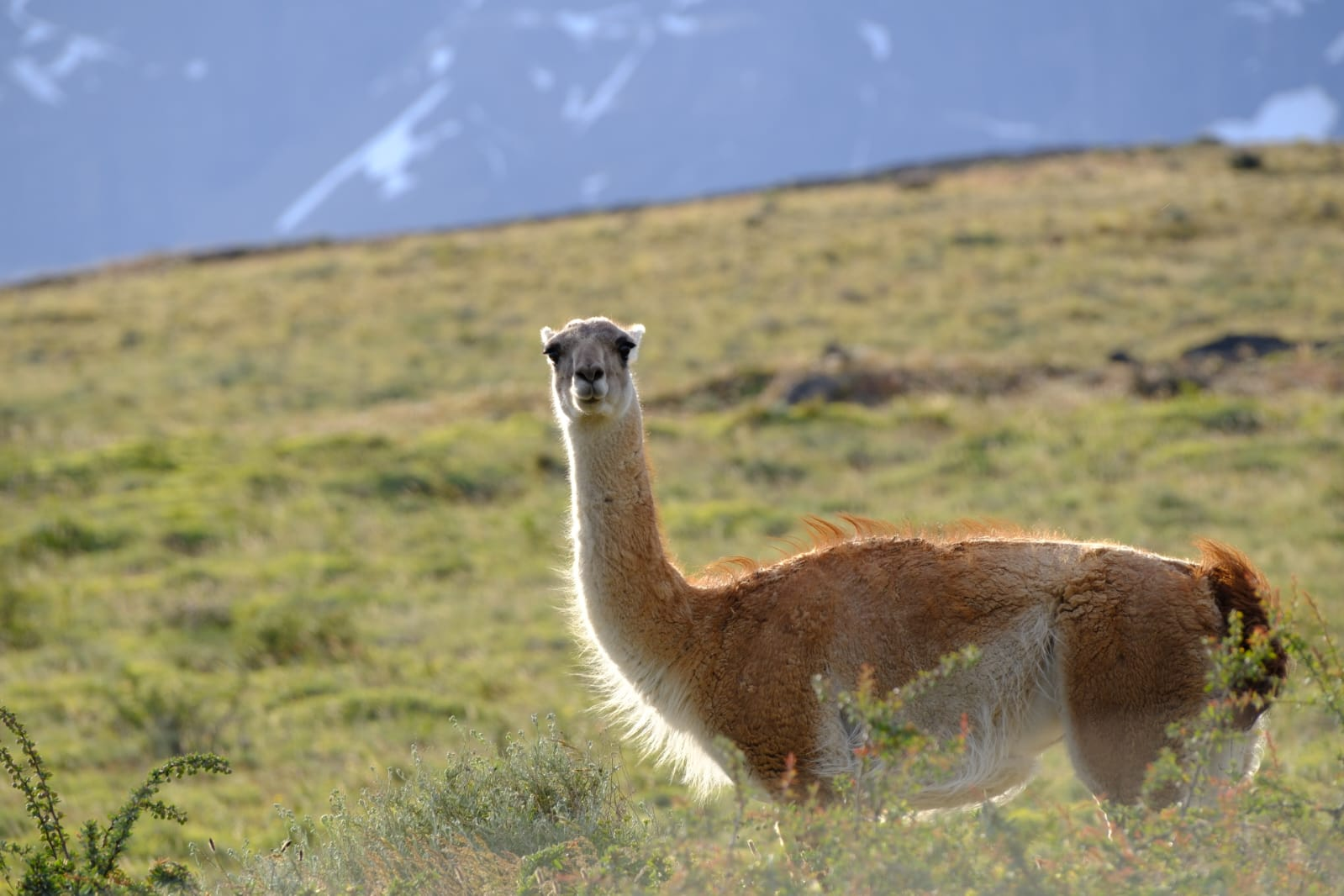
Guanaco in Torres del Paine natural park

The guanaco (Lama guanicoe), South American cougar (Puma concolor concolor), the Patagonian fox (Lycalopex griseus), Patagonian hog-nosed skunk (Conepatus humboldtii), and Magellanic tuco-tuco (Ctenomys magellanicus; a subterranean rodent) are the most characteristic mammals of the Patagonian plains. The Patagonian steppe is one of the last strongholds of the guanaco and Darwin's rheas (Rhea pennata), which had been hunted for their skins by the Tehuelches, on foot using boleadoras, before the diffusion of firearms and horses; they were formerly the chief means of subsistence for the natives, who hunted them on horseback with dogs and bolas. Vizcachas (Lagidum spp.) and the Patagonian mara (Dolichotis patagonum) are also characteristic of the steppe and the pampas to the north.

The fauna of Patagonia was heavily decimated by the end-Pleistocene extinction event around 12–10,000 years ago that resulted in the extinction of most large (megafaunal) animal species native to the region (as well as across the Americas). Species formerly present in the region include the large cow-sized ground sloth Mylodon, the large camel-like ungulate Macrauchenia, indigenous equines belonging to the genus Hippidion, the giant short-faced bear Arctotherium, and the large sabertooth cat Smilodon. The extinct fox Dusicyon avus (a close relative of the Falkland Islands wolf) also formerly inhabited the region, until apparently becoming extinct around 500–400 years ago. Patagonia was inhabited by the jaguar subspecies Panthera onca mesembrina, considerably larger than today's jaguars, during the Pleistocene, with jaguars continuing to inhabit Patagonia until the late 19th century, but now extirpated from the region.

Bird life is often abundant. The crested caracara (Caracara plancus) is one of the characteristic aspects of a Patagonian landscape; the presence of austral parakeets (Enicognathus ferrugineus) as far south as the shores of the strait attracted the attention of the earlier navigators, and green-backed firecrowns (Sephanoides sephaniodes), a species of hummingbird, may be seen flying amid the snowfall. One of the largest birds in the world, the Andean condor (Vultur gryphus) can be seen in Patagonia. Of the many kinds of waterfowl the Chilean flamingo (Phoenicopterus chilensis), the upland goose (Chloephaga picta), and in the strait, the remarkable steamer ducks are found.

Signature marine fauna include the southern right whale, the Magellanic penguin (Spheniscus magellanicus), the killer whale, and elephant seals. The Valdés Peninsula is a UNESCO World Heritage Site, designated for its global significance as a site for the conservation of marine mammals.

The Patagonian freshwater fish fauna is relatively restricted compared to other similar Southern Hemisphere regions. The Argentine part is home to a total of 29 freshwater fish species, 18 of which are native. The introduced are several species of trout, common carp, and various species that originated in more northerly parts of South America. The natives are osmeriforms (Aplochiton and Galaxias), temperate perches (Percichthys), catfish (Diplomystes, Hatcheria and Trichomycterus), Neotropical silversides (Odontesthes) and characiforms (Astyanax, Cheirodon, Gymnocharacinus, and Oligosarcus). Other Patagonian freshwater fauna include the highly unusual aeglid crustaceans.

== History ==
=== Pre-Columbian Patagonia (10,000 BC – AD 1520) ===
Map of the indigenous peoples of southern Patagonia

Human habitation of the region dates back thousands of years, with some early archaeological findings in the area dated to at least the 13th millennium BC, although later dates around the 10th millennium BC are more securely recognized. Evidence exists of human activity at Monte Verde in Llanquihue Province, Chile, dated to around 14,500 years Before Present (~12,500 BC). The glacial-period ice fields and subsequent large meltwater streams would have made settlement difficult at that time.

The region seems to have been inhabited continuously since 10,000 BC by various cultures and alternating waves of migration, the details of which are as yet poorly understood. Several sites have been excavated, notably caves such as Cueva del Milodon in Última Esperanza in southern Patagonia, and Tres Arroyos on Tierra del Fuego, that support this date. Hearths, stone scrapers, and animal remains dated to 9400–9200 BC have been found east of the Andes.

At the close of the Pleistocene around 12–11,000 years ago (10,000-9,000 BC) Fishtail projectile points (a type of knapped stone spear point) were widespread across Patagonia (along with much of the rest of South America). At several sites these points have been found associated with extinct megafauna, including the large ground sloth Mylodon and the native equine Hippidion.

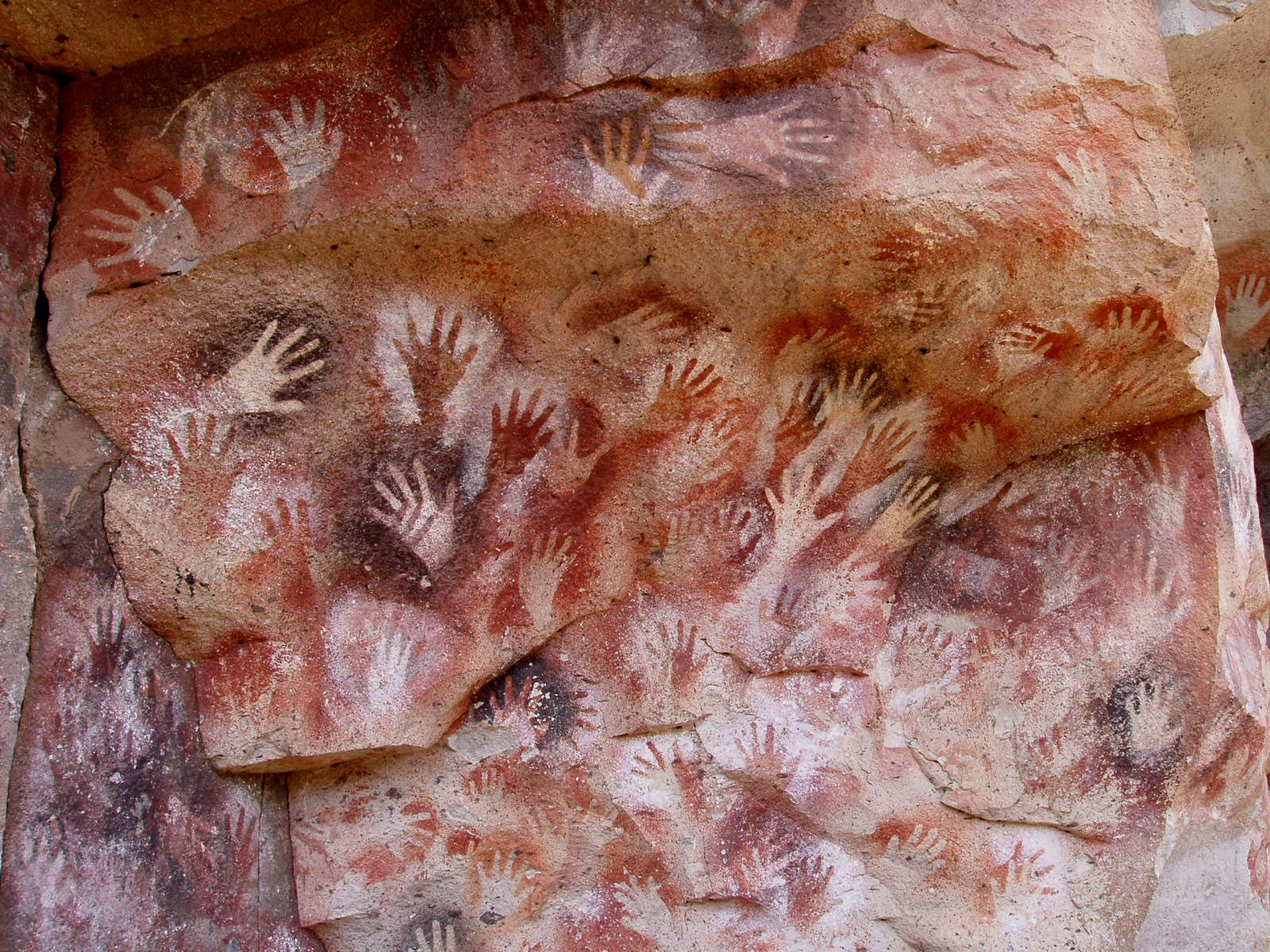
Cueva de las Manos site in Santa Cruz, Argentina

The Cueva de las Manos is a famous site in Santa Cruz, Argentina. This cave at the foot of a cliff is covered in wall paintings, particularly the negative images of hundreds of hands, believed to date from around 8000 BC.

Based on artifacts found in the region, apparently hunting of guanaco, and to a lesser extent rhea (ñandú), were the primary food sources of tribes living on the eastern plains. It is also not clear if domestic dogs were part of early human activity. Bolas are commonly found and were used to catch guanaco and rhea. A maritime tradition existed along the Pacific coast, whose latest exponents were the Yaghan (Yámana) to the south of Tierra del Fuego, the Kaweshqar between Taitao Peninsula and Tierra del Fuego, and the Chono people in the Chonos Archipelago. The Selkʼnam, Haush, and Tehuelche are generally thought to be culturally and linguistically related peoples physically distinct from the sea-faring peoples.

It is possible that Isla Grande de Tierra del Fuego was connected to the mainland in the Early Holocene (c. 9000 years BP) much in the same way that Riesco Island was back then. A Selkʼnam tradition recorded by the Salesian missionary Giuseppe María Beauvoir relate that the Selkʼnam arrived in Tierra del Fuego by land, and that the Selkʼnam were later unable to return north as the sea had flooded their crossing.

Agriculture was practised in Pre-Hispanic Argentina as far south as southern Mendoza Province. Agriculture was at times practised beyond this limit in nearby areas of Patagonia but populations reverted at times to non-agricultural lifestyles. By the time of the Spanish arrival to the area (1550s) there is no record of agriculture being practised in northern Patagonia. The extensive Patagonian grasslands and an associated abundance of guanaco game may have contributed for the indigenous populations to favour a hunter-gathered lifestyle.

The indigenous peoples of the region included the Tehuelches, whose numbers and society were reduced to near extinction not long after the first contacts with Europeans. Tehuelches included the Gununa'kena to the north, Mecharnuekenk in south-central Patagonia, and the Aonikenk or Southern Tehuelche in the far south, north of the Magellan strait. On Isla Grande de Tierra del Fuego, the Selkʼnam (Ona) and Haush (Manek'enk) lived in the north and southeast, respectively. In the archipelagos to the south of Tierra del Fuego were Yámana, with the Kawéskar (Alakaluf) in the coastal areas and islands in western Tierra del Fuego and the southwest of the mainland. In the Patagonian archipelagoes north of Taitao Peninsula lived the Chonos. These groups were encountered in the first periods of European contact with different lifestyles, body decoration, and language, although it is unclear when this configuration emerged.

Towards the end of the 16th century, Mapuche-speaking agriculturalists penetrated the western Andes and from there across into the eastern plains and down to the far south. Through confrontation and technological ability, they came to dominate the other peoples of the region in a short period of time, and are the principal indigenous community today.

=== Early European exploration (1520–1669) ===
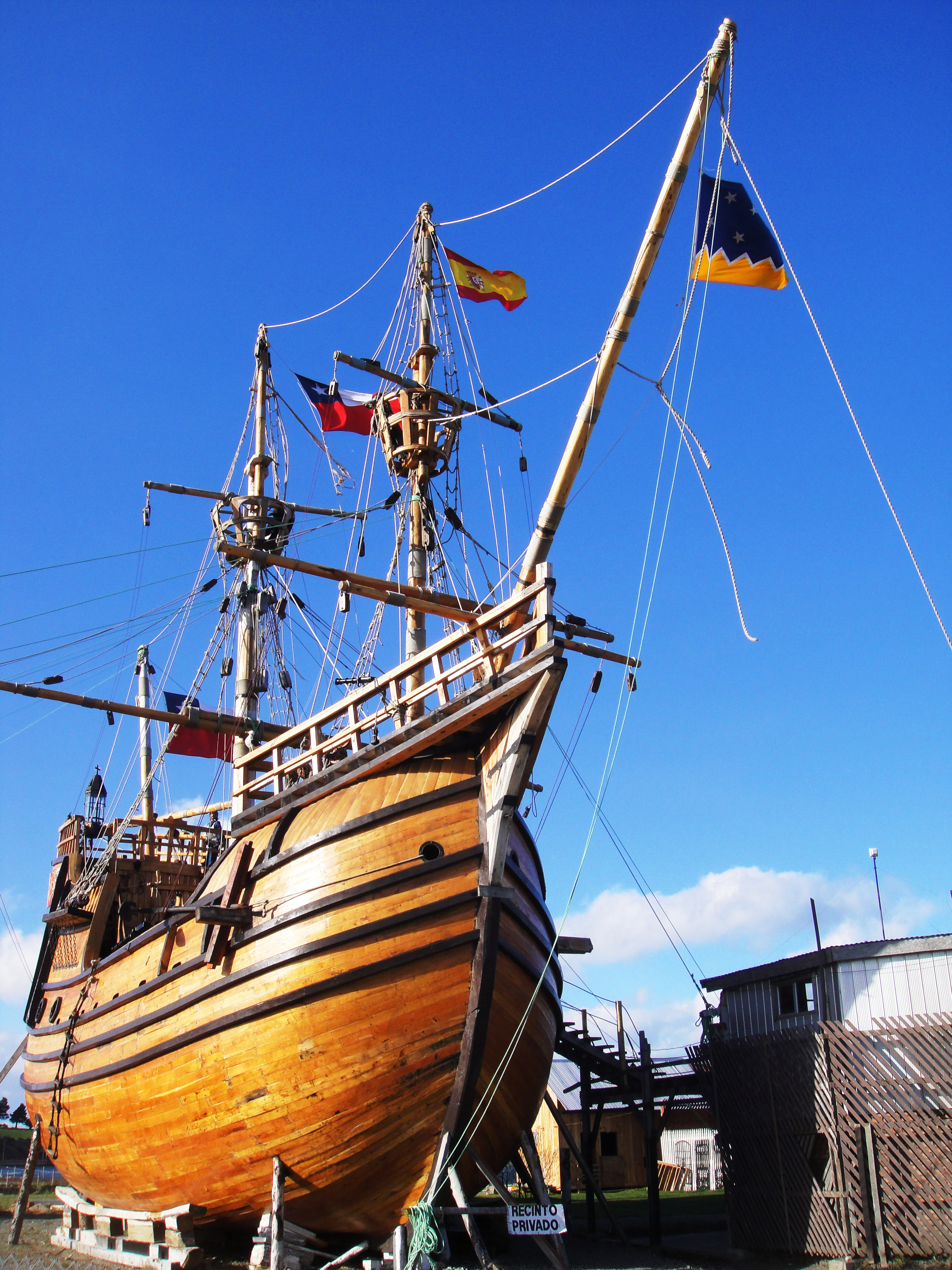
Nao Victoria, the replica of the first ship to pass through the Strait of Magellan

Navigators such as Gonçalo Coelho and Amerigo Vespucci possibly had reached the area (his own account of 1502 has it that they reached the latitude 52°S), but Vespucci's failure to accurately describe the main geographical features of the region such as the Río de la Plata casts doubts on whether they really did so.

The first or more detailed description of part of the coastline of Patagonia is possibly mentioned in a Portuguese voyage in 1511–1512, traditionally attributed to captain Diogo Ribeiro, who after his death was replaced by Estevão de Frois, and was guided by the pilot and cosmographer João de Lisboa). The explorers, after reaching Rio de la Plata (which they would explore on the return voyage, contacting the Charrúa and other peoples) eventually reached San Matias Gulf, at 42°S. The expedition reported that after going south of the 40th parallel, they found a "land" or a "point extending into the sea", and further south, a gulf. The expedition is said to have rounded the gulf for nearly 300 km (186 mi) and sighted the continent on the southern side of the gulf.

The Atlantic coast of Patagonia was first fully explored in 1520 by the Spanish expedition led by Ferdinand Magellan, who on his passage along the coast named many of its more striking features – San Matías Gulf, Cape of 11,000 Virgins (now simply Cape Virgenes), and others. Magellan's fleet spent a difficult winter at what he named Puerto San Julián before resuming its voyage further south on 21 August 1520. During this time, it encountered the local inhabitants, likely to be Tehuelche people, described by his reporter, Antonio Pigafetta, as giants called Patagons.

The territory was claimed as part of the Governorate of New Léon, granted in 1534 to Governor Simón de Alcazaba y Sotomayor, part of the Governorates of the Spanish Empire of the Americas. The territory was redefined in 1534 and consisted of the southernmost part of the South American continent and the islands towards Antarctica.

Rodrigo de Isla, sent inland in 1535 from San Matías by Simón de Alcazaba y Sotomayor (on whom Patagonia had been conferred by Charles I of Spain, is presumed to have been the first European to have traversed the great Patagonian plain. If the men under his charge had not mutinied, he might have crossed the Andes to reach the Pacific coast.

Community of jurisdictions of the Governorate of La Plata and the Captaincy General of Chile between 1570 and 1661 according to Manuel Ravest Mora

Pedro de Mendoza, on whom the country was next bestowed, founded Buenos Aires, but did not venture south. Francisco de Camargo (1536), Alonso de Camargo (1539), Juan Ladrilleros (1557), and Hurtado de Mendoza (1558) helped to make known the Pacific coasts, and while Sir Francis Drake's voyage in 1577 down the Atlantic coast, through the Strait of Magellan and northward along the Pacific coast, was memorable, yet the descriptions of the geography of Patagonia owe much more to the Spanish explorer Pedro Sarmiento de Gamboa (1579–1580), who, devoting himself especially to the south-west region, made careful and accurate surveys. The settlements that he founded at Nombre de Jesús and San Felipe was neglected by the Spanish government, the latter being abandoned before Thomas Cavendish visited it in 1587 during his circumnavigation, and so desolate that he called it Port Famine. After the discovery of the route around Cape Horn, the Spanish Crown lost interest in southern Patagonia until the 18th century, when the coastal settlements Carmen de Patagones, San José, Puerto Deseado, and Nueva Colonia Floridablanca were established, although it maintained its claim of a de jure sovereignty over the area.

The district around Puerto Deseado was explored and claimed in 1670 by Sir John Narborough for King Charles II of England, but the English made no attempt to establish settlements or explore the interior.

==== Patagonian giants: early European perceptions ====
The first European explorers of Patagonia observed that the indigenous people in the region were taller than the average Europeans of the time, prompting some of them to believe that Patagonians were giants.

According to Antonio Pigafetta, one of the Magellan expedition's few survivors and its published chronicler, Magellan bestowed the name Patagão (or Patagón) on the inhabitants they encountered there, and the name "Patagonia" for the region. Although Pigafetta's account does not describe how this name came about, subsequent popular interpretations gave credence to a derivation meaning "land of the big feet". However, this etymology is questionable. The term is most likely derived from an actual character name, "Patagón", a savage creature confronted by Primaleón of Greece, the hero in the homonymous Spanish chivalry novel (or knight-errantry tale) by Francisco Vázquez. This book, published in 1512, was the sequel of the romance Palmerín de Oliva;it was much in vogue at the time, and a favorite reading of Magellan. Magellan's perception of the natives, dressed in skins, and eating raw meat, clearly recalled the uncivilized Patagón in Vázquez's book. Novelist and travel writer Bruce Chatwin suggests etymological roots of both Patagon and Patagonia in his book, In Patagonia, noting the similarity between "Patagon" and the Greek word παταγος, which means "a roaring" or "gnashing of teeth" (in his chronicle, Pigafetta describes the Patagonians as "roaring like bulls").

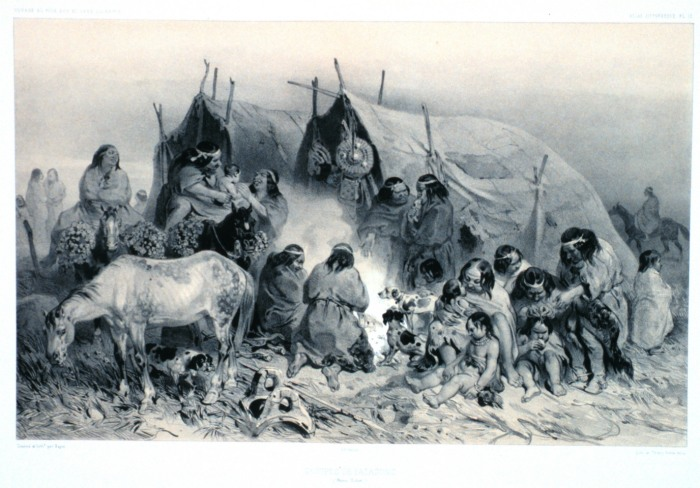
An 1840s illustration of indigenous Patagonians from near the Straits of Magellan, from Voyage au pole sud et dans l'Océanie by French explorer Jules Dumont d'Urville

The main interest in the region sparked by Pigafetta's account came from his reports of their meeting with the local inhabitants, whom they claimed to measure some 9 to 12 feet (2.7 to 3.7 m) in height – "so tall that we reached only to his waist" – hence the later idea that Patagonia meant "big feet". This supposed race of Patagonian giants or Patagones entered into the common European perception of this then little-known and distant area, to be further fueled by subsequent reports of other expeditions and famous travelers such as Sir Francis Drake, which seemed to confirm these accounts. Early charts of the New World sometimes added the legend regio gigantum ("region of the giants") to the Patagonian area. By 1611, the Patagonian god Setebos (Settaboth in Pigafetta) was familiar to the hearers of The Tempest.

The concept and general belief persisted for a further 250 years and was to be sensationally reignited in 1767 when an "official" (but anonymous) account was published of Commodore John Byron's recent voyage of global circumnavigation in HMS Dolphin. Byron and crew had spent some time along the coast, and the publication (Voyage Round the World in His Majesty's Ship the Dolphin) seemed to give proof positive of their existence; the publication became an overnight bestseller, thousands of extra copies were to be sold to a willing public, and other prior accounts of the region were hastily republished (even those in which giant-like folk were not mentioned at all).

However, the Patagonian giant frenzy died down substantially only a few years later, when some more sober and analytical accounts were published. In 1773, John Hawkesworth published on behalf of the Admiralty a compendium of noted English southern-hemisphere explorers' journals, including that of James Cook and John Byron. In this publication, drawn from their official logs, the people Byron's expedition had encountered clearly were no taller than 6-foot-6-inch (1.98 m), very tall but by no means giants. Interest soon subsided, although awareness of and belief in the concept persisted in some quarters even into the 20th century.

=== Spanish outposts ===
The failure of the Spanish colonization of the Strait of Magellan made the Chiloé Archipelago play an essential role as a Spanish base for protecting western Patagonia from the intrusion of other powers. Valdivia, reestablished in 1645, and Chiloé acted as sentries, being hubs where the Spanish collected information and rumors from all over Patagonia.

As a result of the privateer and pirate menace, Spanish authorities ordered the depopulation of the Guaitecas Archipelago to deprive enemies of any eventual support from native populations. This then led to the transfer of the majority of the indigenous Chono population to the Chiloé Archipelago in the north while some Chonos moved south of Taitao Peninsula effectively depopulating the territory in the 18th century.

The publication of Thomas Falkner's book A Description of Patagonia and the Adjacent Parts of South America in England fuelled speculations in Spain about renewed British interest in Patagonia. In response an order from the King of Spain was issued to settle the eastern coast of Patagonia. This led to the brief existence of colonies at the Gulf of San Jorge (1778–1779) and San Julián (1780–1783) and the more longlasting colony of Carmen de Patagones.

=== Scientific exploration (1764–1842) ===
In the second half of the 18th century, European knowledge of Patagonia was further augmented by the voyages of the previously mentioned John Byron (1764–1765), Samuel Wallis (1766, in the same HMS Dolphin which Byron had earlier sailed in) and Louis Antoine de Bougainville (1766). Thomas Falkner, a Jesuit who resided near forty years in those parts, published his Description of Patagonia (Hereford, 1774); Francisco Viedma founded El Carmen, nowadays Carmen de Patagones and Antonio settled the area of San Julian Bay, where he founded the colony of Floridablanca and advanced inland to the Andes (1782). Basilio Villarino ascended the Rio Negro (1782).

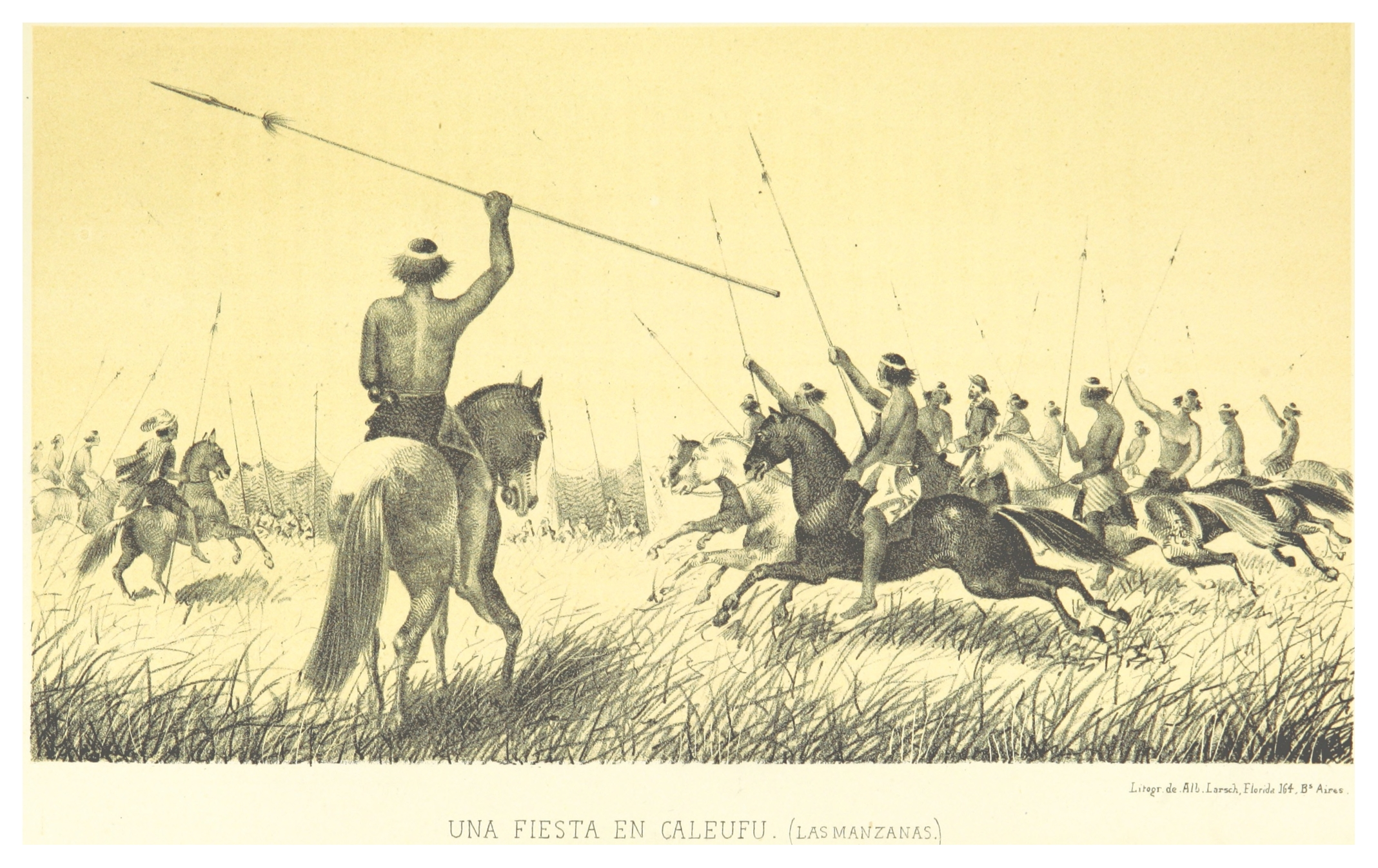
Tehuelche warriors in Patagonia

Two hydrographic surveys of the coasts were of first-rate importance; the first expedition (1826–1830) included HMS Adventure and HMS Beagle under Phillip Parker King, and the second (1832–1836) was the voyage of the Beagle under Robert FitzRoy. The latter expedition is particularly noted for the participation of Charles Darwin, who spent considerable time investigating various areas of Patagonia onshore, including long rides with gauchos in Río Negro, and who joined FitzRoy in a 200-mile (320 km) expedition taking ships' boats up the course of the Santa Cruz River.

=== Spanish American independence wars ===
During the independence wars, rumours about the imminent arrival of Spanish troops to Patagonia, either from Peru or Chiloé, were common among indigenous peoples of the Pampas and northern Patagonia. In 1820 Chilean patriot leader José Miguel Carrera allied with the indigenous Ranquel people of the Pampas to fight the rival patriots in Buenos Aires. José Miguel Carrera ultimately planned to cross the Andes into Chile and oust his rivals in Chile.

The last royalist armed group in what is today Argentina and Chile, the Pincheira brothers, moved from the vicinities of Chillán across the Andes into northern Patagonia as patriots consolidated control of Chile. The Pincheira brothers was an outlaw gang made of Europeans Spanish, American Spanish, Mestizos and local indigenous peoples. This group was able to move to Patagonia thanks to its alliance with two indigenous tribes, the Ranqueles and the Boroanos. In the interior of Patagonia, far from the de facto territory of Chile and the United Provinces, the Pincheira brothers established permanent encampment with thousands of settlers. From their bases the Pincheiras led numerous raids into the countryside of the newly established republics.

=== Chilean and Argentine colonization (1843–1902) ===
Map of the East Patagonia, Tierra del Fuego and Strait of Magellan Dispute. In blue and green are the boundaries claimed by Argentine and Chilean historians respectably as uti possidetis iuris in Patagonia.

In the early 19th century, the araucanization of the natives of northern Patagonia intensified, and many Mapuches migrated to Patagonia to live as nomads that raised cattle or pillaged the Argentine countryside. The cattle stolen in the incursions (malones) were later taken to Chile through the mountain passes and traded for goods, especially alcoholic beverages. The main trail for this trade was called Camino de los chilenos and runs a length around 1,000 km (620 mi) from the Buenos Aires Province to the mountain passes of Neuquén Province. The lonco Calfucurá crossed the Andes from Chile to the pampas around 1830, after a call from the governor of Buenos Aires, Juan Manuel de Rosas, to fight the Boroano people. In 1859, he attacked Bahía Blanca in Argentina with 3,000 warriors. As in the case of Calfucura, many other bands of Mapuches got involved in the internal conflicts of Argentina until Conquest of the Desert. To counter the cattle raids, a trench called the Zanja de Alsina was built by Argentina in the pampas in the 1870s.

Chile's effective presence in Southern Patagonia (1843-1879)

In the mid-19th century, the newly independent nations of Argentina and Chile began an aggressive phase of expansion into the south, increasing confrontation with the Indigenous peoples of the region. In 1860, French adventurer Orelie-Antoine de Tounens proclaimed himself king of the Kingdom of Araucanía and Patagonia of the Mapuche.

Following the last instructions of Bernardo O'Higgins, the Chilean president Manuel Bulnes sent an expedition to the Strait of Magellan and founded Fuerte Bulnes in 1843. Five years later, the Chilean government moved the main settlement to the current location of Punta Arenas, the oldest permanent settlement in Southern Patagonia. The creation of Punta Arenas was instrumental in making Chile's claim of the Strait of Magellan permanent. In the 1860s, sheep from the Falkland Islands were introduced to the lands around the Straits of Magellan, and throughout the 19th century, sheepfarming grew to be the most important economic sector in southern Patagonia.

George Chaworth Musters in 1869 wandered in company with a band of Tehuelches through the whole length of the country from the strait to the Manzaneros in the northwest, and collected a great deal of information about the people and their mode of life.

==== Conquest of the Desert and the 1881 treaty ====
Territorial losses of the Republic of Chile de jure (by law) according to Chilean historiography

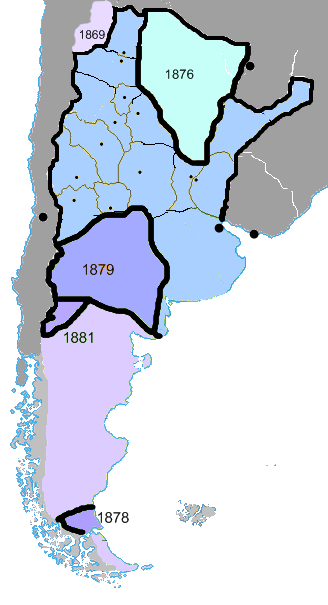
Under General Roca, the Conquest of the Desert extended Argentine power into Patagonia.

Argentine authorities worried that the strong connections araucanized tribes had with Chile would allegedly give Chile certain influence over the pampas. Argentine authorities feared that in an eventual war with Chile over Patagonia, the natives would side with the Chileans and the war would be brought to the vicinity of Buenos Aires.

The decision to plan and execute the Conquest of the Desert was probably catalyzed by the 1872 attack of Cufulcurá and his 6,000 followers on the cities of General Alvear, Veinticinco de Mayo, and Nueve de Julio, where 300 criollos were killed, and 200,000 heads of cattle taken. In the 1870s, the Conquest of the Desert was a controversial campaign by the Argentine government, executed mainly by General Julio Argentino Roca, to subdue or, some claim, to exterminate the native peoples of the south.

In 1885, a mining expeditionary party under the Romanian adventurer Julius Popper landed in southern Patagonia in search of gold, which they found after traveling southwards towards the lands of Tierra del Fuego. This led to the further opening up of the area to prospectors. European missionaries and settlers arrived throughout the 19th and 20th centuries, notably the Welsh settlement of the Chubut Valley. Numerous Croatians also settled in Patagonia.

During the first years of the 20th century, the border between the two nations in Patagonia was established by the mediation of the British crown. Numerous modifications have been made since then, the last conflict having been resolved in 1994 by an arbitration tribunal constituted in Rio de Janeiro. It granted Argentina sovereignty over the Southern Patagonia Icefield, Cerro Fitz Roy, and Laguna del Desierto.

Until 1902, a large proportion of Patagonia's population were natives of Chiloé Archipelago (Chilotes), who worked as peons in large livestock-farming estancias. Because they were manual laborers, their social status was below that of the gauchos and the Argentine, Chilean, and European landowners and administrators.

Before and after 1902, when the boundaries were drawn, Argentina expelled many Chilotes from their territory, as they feared that having a large Chilean population in Argentina could pose a risk to their future control. These workers founded the first inland Chilean settlement in what is now the Aysén Region; Balmaceda. Lacking good grasslands on the forest-covered Chilean side, the immigrants burned down the forest, setting fires that could last more than two years.

== Economy ==
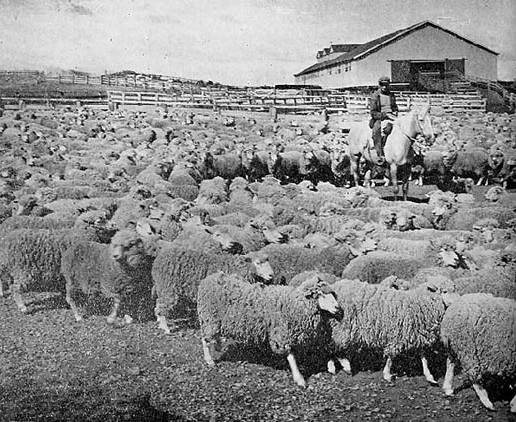
Tierra del Fuego sheep ranch, 1942: The region's primary activity then, it has been eclipsed by the decline in the global wool market as much as by petroleum and gas extraction.

The area's principal economic activities have been mining, whaling, livestock (notably sheep throughout) agriculture (wheat and fruit production near the Andes towards the north), and oil after its discovery near Comodoro Rivadavia in 1907.

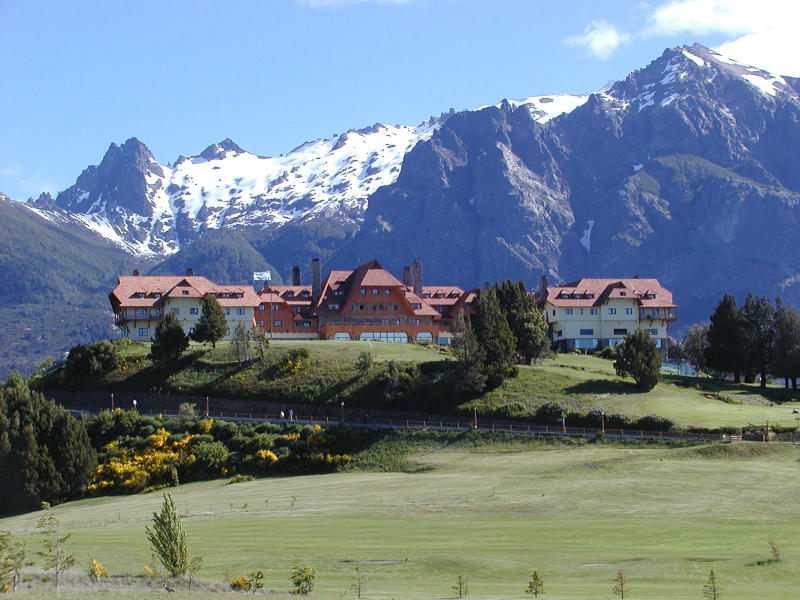
The Llao Llao Hotel in San Carlos de Bariloche. The city is the largest tourist destination in all of Patagonia.

Energy production is also a crucial part of the local economy. Railways were planned to cover continental Argentine Patagonia to serve the oil, mining, agricultural, and energy industries, and a line was built connecting San Carlos de Bariloche to Buenos Aires. Portions of other lines were built to the south, but the only lines still in use are La Trochita in Esquel, the Train of the End of the World in Ushuaia, both heritage lines, and a short run Tren Histórico de Bariloche to Perito Moreno.

In the western forest-covered Patagonian Andes and archipelagoes, wood logging has historically been an important part of the economy; it impelled the colonization of the areas of the Nahuel Huapi and Lácar lakes in Argentina and Guaitecas Archipelago in Chile.

=== Livestock ===
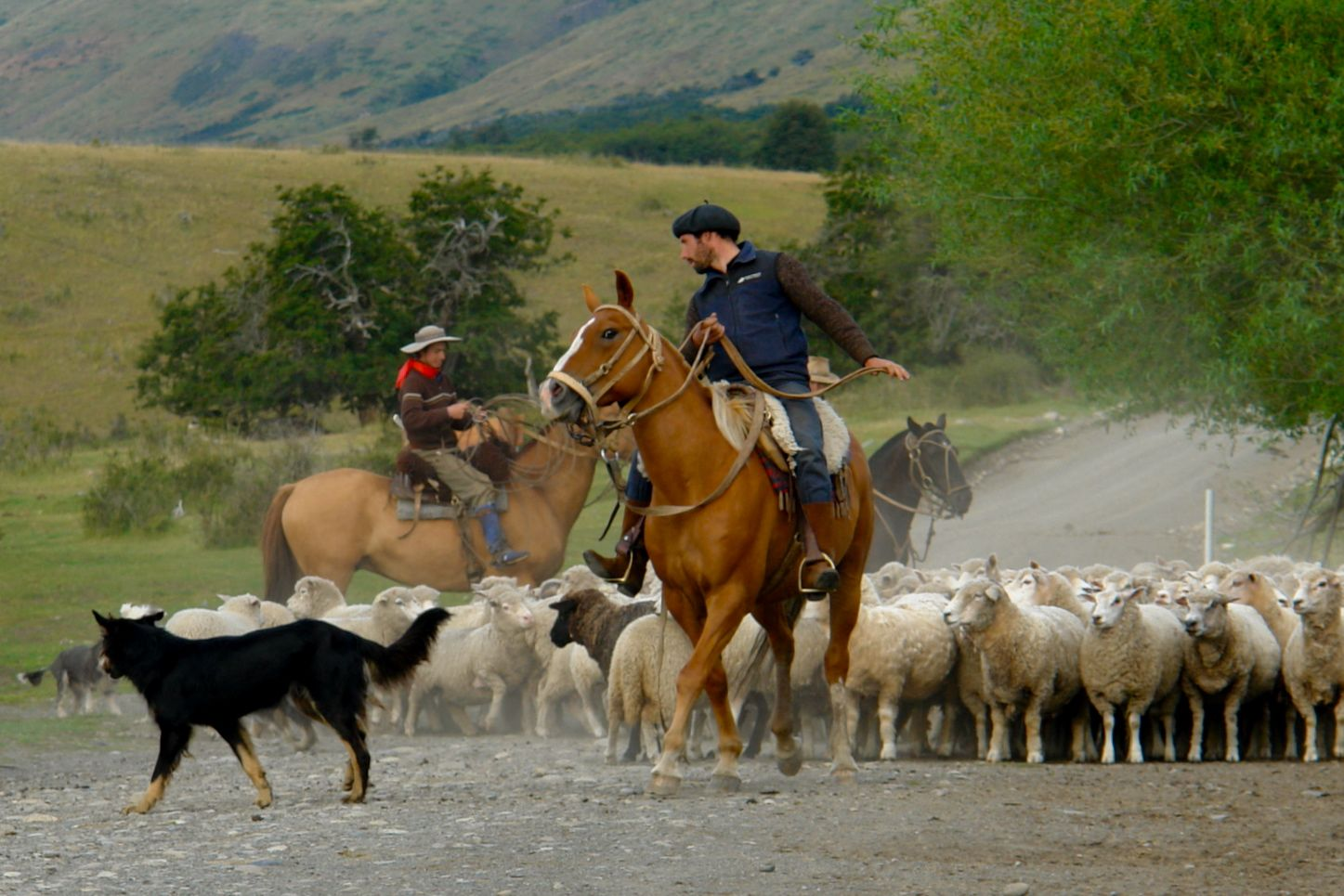
Gauchos mustering sheep in Patagonia

Sheep farming introduced in the late 19th century has been a principal economic activity. After reaching its heights during the First World War, the decline in world wool prices affected sheep farming in Argentina. Nowadays, about half of Argentina's 15 million sheep are in Patagonia, a percentage that is growing as sheep farming disappears in the pampas to the north. Chubut (mainly Merino) is the top wool producer with Santa Cruz (Corriedale and some Merino) second. Sheep farming revived in 2002 with the devaluation of the peso and firmer global demand for wool (led by China and the EU). Still, little investment occurs in new abattoirs (mainly in Comodoro Rivadavia, Trelew, and Rio Gallegos), and often phytosanitary restrictions reduce the export of sheep meat. Extensive valleys in the Cordilleran Range have provided sufficient grazing lands, and the low humidity and weather of the southern region make raising Merino and Corriedale sheep common.

Livestock also includes small numbers of cattle, and in lesser numbers, pigs and horses. Sheep farming provides a small but important number of jobs for rural areas with little other employment.

=== Tourism ===
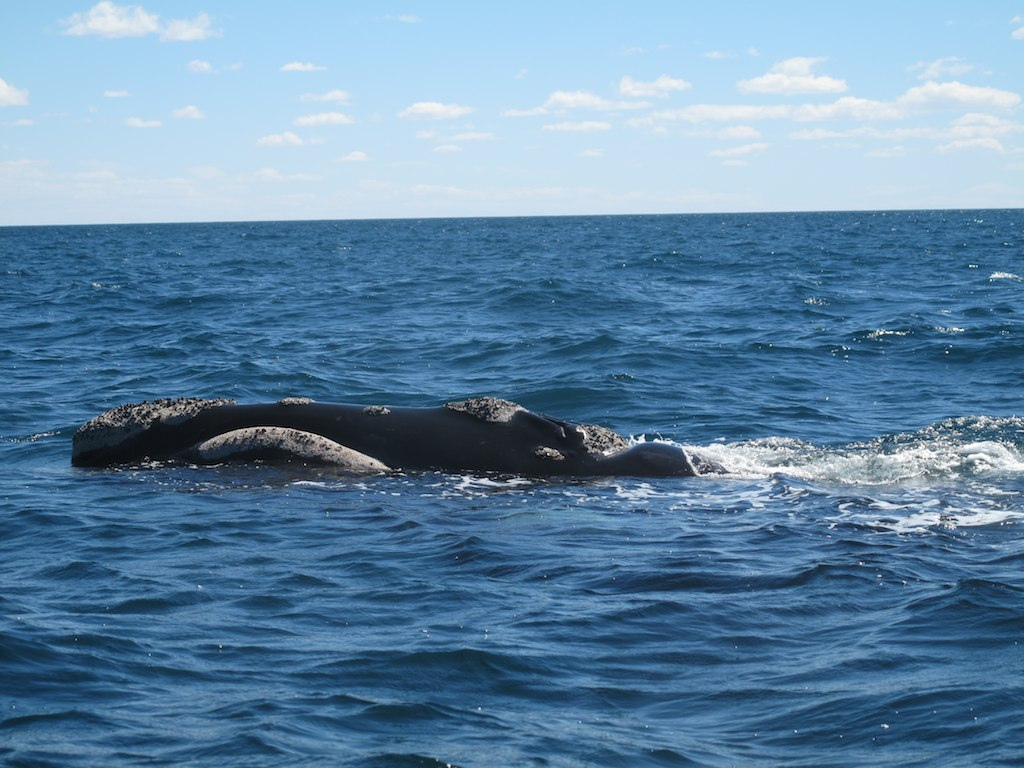
Whale watching off the Valdes Peninsula

In the second half of the 20th century, tourism became an ever more important part of Patagonia's economy. Originally a remote backpacking destination, the region has attracted increasing numbers of upmarket visitors, cruise passengers rounding Cape Horn or visiting Antarctica, and adventure and activity holiday-makers. Principal tourist attractions include the Perito Moreno glacier, the Valdés Peninsula, the Argentine Lake District and Ushuaia and Tierra del Fuego (the city is also a jumping-off place for travel to Antarctica, bringing in still more visitors). Tourism has created new markets locally and for export for traditional crafts such as Mapuche handicrafts, guanaco textiles, and confectionery and preserves.

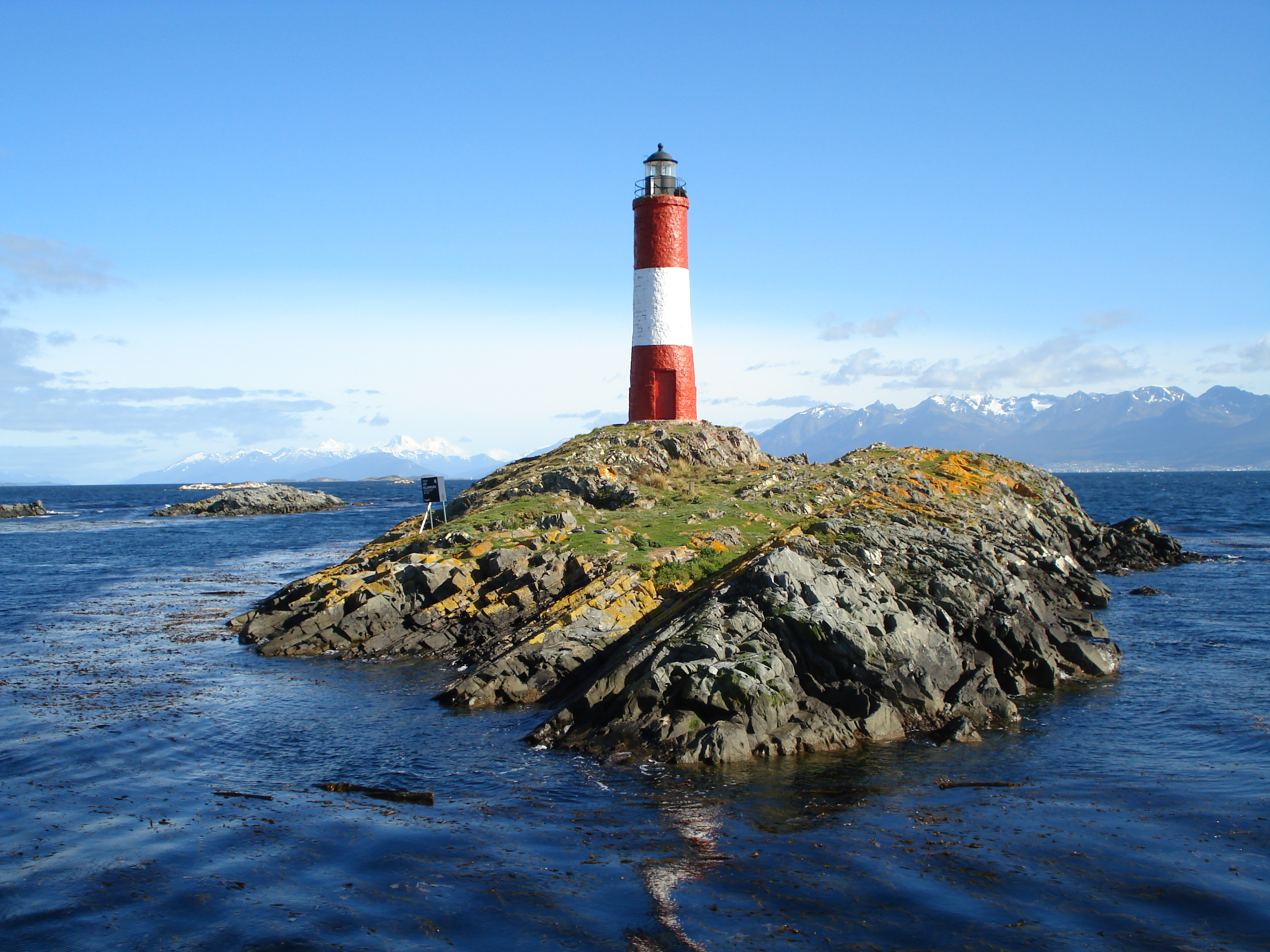
The Les Éclaireurs Lighthouse, in Ushuaia (Argentina)

A spin-off from increased tourism has been the buying of often enormous tracts of land by foreigners, often as a prestige purchase rather than for agriculture. Buyers have included Sylvester Stallone, Ted Turner, and Christopher Lambert, and most notably Luciano Benetton, Patagonia's largest landowner. His "Compañia de Tierras Sud" has brought new techniques to the ailing sheep-rearing industry and sponsored museums and community facilities, but has been controversial particularly for its treatment of local Mapuche communities.

=== Energy ===
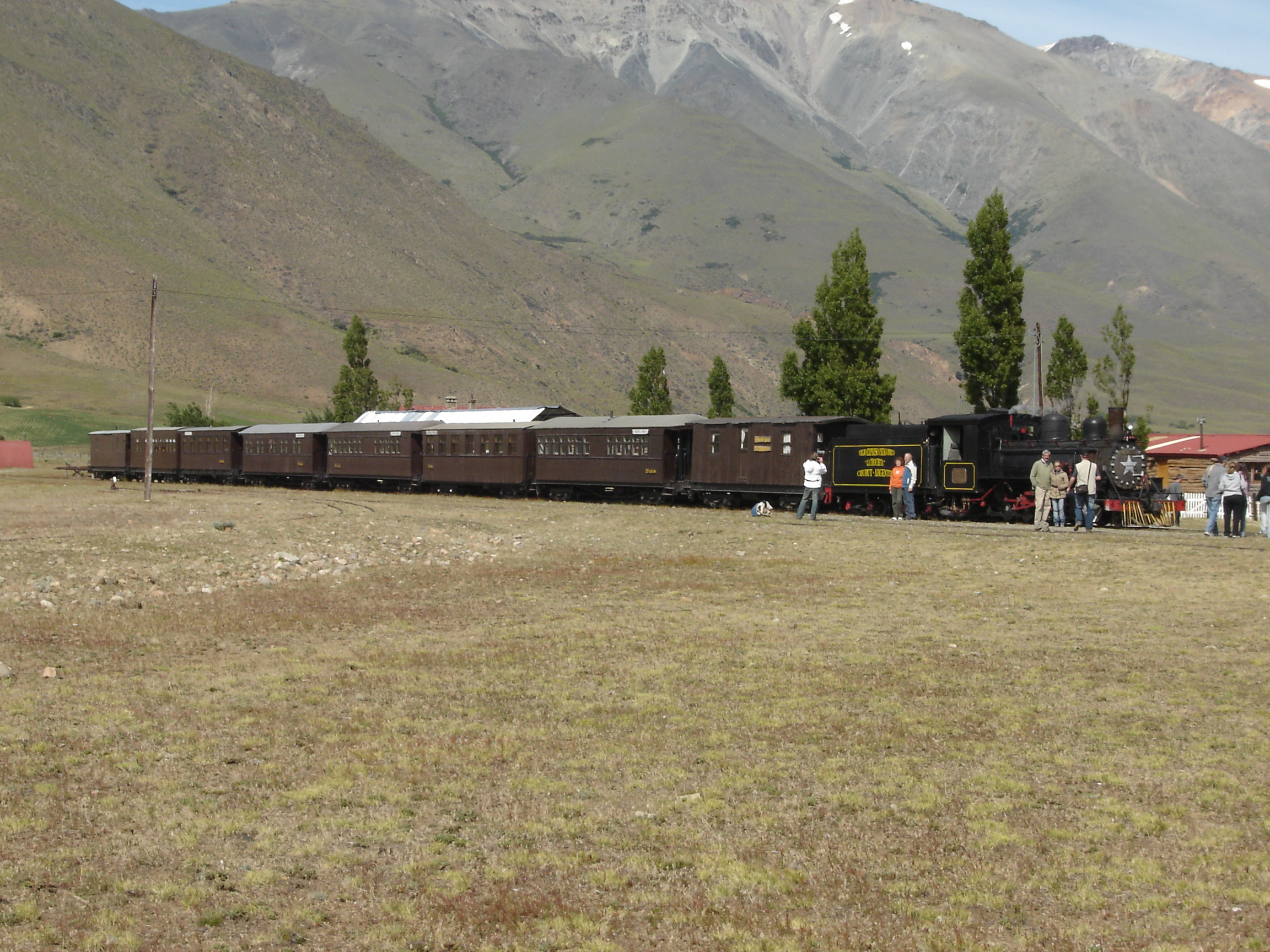
La Trochita on its Chubut Province route: Formerly the sole rapid transport means in the province, La Trochita is now a tourist attraction.

Due to its sparse rainfall in agricultural areas, Argentine Patagonia already has numerous dams for irrigation, some of which are also used for hydropower. The Limay River is used to generate hydroelectricity at five dams built on its course: Alicurá, Piedra del Águila, Pichi Picún Leufú, El Chocón, and Arroyito. Together with the Cerros Colorados Complex on the Neuquén River, they contribute more than one-quarter of the total hydroelectric generation in the country.

Patagonia has always been Argentina's main area, and Chile's only area, of conventional oil and gas production. Oil and gas have played an important role in the rise of Neuquén-Cipolleti as Patagonia's most populous urban area, and in the growth of Comodoro Rivadavia, Punta Arenas, and Rio Grande, as well. The development of the Neuquén basin's enormous unconventional oil and gas reserves through hydraulic fracturing has just begun, but the YPF-Chevron Loma Campana field in the Vaca Muerta formation is already the world's largest producing shale oil field outside North America according to former YPF CEO Miguel Gallucio.

Patagonia's notorious winds have already made the area Argentina's main source of wind power, and plans have been made for major increases in wind power generation. Coal is mined in the Rio Turbio area and used for electricity generation.

== Cuisine ==
Argentine Patagonian cuisine is largely the same as the cuisine of Buenos Aires – grilled meats and pasta – with extensive use of local ingredients and less use of those products that have to be imported into the region. Lamb is considered the traditional Patagonian meat, grilled for several hours over an open fire. Some guide books have reported that game meats, especially guanaco and introduced deer and boar, are popular in restaurant cuisine. However, since guanaco is a protected animal in both Chile and Argentina, it is unlikely to appear commonly as restaurant fare. Trout and centolla (king crab) are also common, though overfishing of centolla has made it increasingly scarce. In the area around Bariloche, a noted Alpine cuisine tradition remains, with chocolate bars and even fondue restaurants, and tea rooms are a feature of the Welsh communities in Gaiman and Trevelin, as well as in the mountains. Since the mid-1990s, some success with winemaking has occurred in Argentine Patagonia, especially in Neuquén.

== Foreign land buyers issue ==
Foreign investors, including Italian multinational Benetton Group, media magnate Ted Turner, British billionaire Joe Lewis and the conservationist Douglas Tompkins, own major land areas. This situation has caused several conflicts with local inhabitants and the governments of Chile and Argentina, for example, the opposition by Douglas Tompkins to the planned route for Carretera Austral in Pumalín Park. A scandal is also brewing about two properties owned by Ted Turner: the estancia La Primavera, located inside Nahuel Huapi National Park, and the estancia Collón Cura. Benetton has faced criticism from Mapuche organizations, including Mapuche International Link, over its purchase of traditional Mapuche lands in Patagonia. The Curiñanco-Nahuelquir family was evicted from their land in 2002 following Benetton's claim to it, but the land was restored in 2007.

== In literature ==
In Jules Verne's 1867–1868 novel Les Enfants du capitaine Grant (The Children of Captain Grant, alternatively 'In Search of the Castaways'), the search for Captain Grant gets underway when the Duncan, a vessel in the ownership of Lord Glenarvan, is taken on a journey to the western shore of South America's Patagonian region where the crew is split up, and Lord Glenarvan proceeds to lead a party eastwards across Patagonia to eventually reunite with the Duncan (which had doubled the Cape in the meanwhile).

The future history depicted in Olaf Stapledon's 1930 novel Last and First Men includes a far future time in which Patagonia becomes the center of a new world civilization while Europe and North America are reduced to the status of backward poverty-stricken areas.

In William Goldman's 1987 movie The Princess Bride, Westley, the current inheritor of the moniker "the Dread Pirate Roberts", states that the "real" (original) Dread Pirate Roberts is retired and "living like a king in Patagonia".

In David Grann's 2023 non-fiction book The Wager: A Tale of Shipwreck, Mutiny and Murder, the surviving crew of HMS Wager are shipwrecked on the Chilean coast of Patagonia, estimating their position to be "at around 47 degrees south and 81:40 degrees west".

In Madeleine l'Engle's A Swiftly Tilting Planet, the fictional country Vespugia is "set in the middle of what used to be called Patagonia, a sizeable area along what are now the boundaries of Chile and Argentina".

== See also ==
- Apostolic Prefecture of Southern Patagonia
- Apostolic Vicariate of Northern Patagonia
- Beagle conflict
- Domuyo
- Francisco Moreno Museum of Patagonia
- Lago Puelo National Park
- Lanín National Park
- Lanín Volcano
- List of deserts by area
- Los Alerces National Park
- Los Glaciares National Park
- Mount Hudson
- Patagonian Expedition Race
- Patagonian Ice Sheet
- Southern Cone
- Wallmapu
