= Governorate of New León =

Spanish governorate in South America, 1534–1542

Governorate of New León Gobernación de Nueva León
- 1534–1544
- Flag

- The adelantado grants of Charles V prior to the establishment of the Viceroyalty of Peru
- Status: Governorate of the Crown of Castile
- Capital: Puerto de los Leones
- Official languages: Spanish
- Religion: Catholicism
- Government: Monarchy
- Governor/Adelantado
  - 1534-1535: Simón de Alcazaba y Sotomayor
  - 1536-1539: Francisco de Camargo
  - 1539-1540: Francisco de la Ribera
- Historical era: Spanish Empire
  - Created Capitulations of 1534: 1534
  - Dissolved by Real Cédula: 1544
- Currency: Escudo
Preceded by
Mapuche
Tehuelche people
Indigenous peoples in Argentina
Indigenous peoples in Chile
Succeeded by
Captaincy General of Chile
Governorate of the Río de la Plata
Governorate of Tucumán

The Governorate of New León was a Governorate of the Crown of Castile created in 1534. It was granted to Simón de Alcazaba y Sotomayor and later to Francisco de Camargo in 1536, expanding the territory to the Strait of Magellan bordering with the Governorate of Terra Australis since 1539.

== History ==
The Governorate was created as one of King Charles V's grants of 1534, establishing the adelantado Simón de Alcazaba y Sotomayor as its first governor, captain general, and chief justice. The territory was described as extending 200 leagues down the Pacific coast from Pedro de Mendoza's grant of New Andalusia.

On May 21, 1534 the king signed three other capitulations to explore and occupy the American lands, establishing provinces or governorates of 200 leagues of north-south extension, including the governorship of Nueva León, granted to Simón de Alcazaba and Sotomayor, also from Atlantic Ocean to Pacific, south of 36° 57' 09S (line from Coronel to Pinamar) and up to 48° 22' 52s (line from Campana Island to Laura Bay).

The Governorate was subsequently extended to the Strait of Magellan and the southern lands from it.

After the death of Simón de Alcazaba y Sotomayor in Patagonia in 1535, Francisco de Camargo attempted to navigate the Strait of Magellan in 1536, but his flagship ran aground in the Primera Angostura. This event later gave rise to the legend of the City of the Caesars.

That same year, he received the royal grant to settle the Strait region thanks to his brother, Bishop Gutierre de Vargas Carvajal, who transferred to him the official rights of a royal capitulation originally issued by Charles I of Spain. This concession authorized the conquest and colonization of lands stretching from the 36th parallel south to the Strait of Magellan.

Camargo was appointed as adelantado, governor, and lifelong captain general, as well as alguacil mayor (chief constable) and lieutenant of three fortresses he was obliged to build. He was also authorized to name a successor after three years of service.

(...) Whereas you, Francisco de Camargo, resident and councilman of the city of Plasencia, our servant, moved by your great will to serve us and to advance the Crown of Castile, offer yourself to go conquer and settle the lands and provinces yet to be conquered and settled along the coast of the South Sea, from the end of the two hundred leagues granted as governorship to Don Pedro de Mendoza, down to the Strait of Magellan; and including the entire coastal and inland region of said strait, around to the other sea up to the degree corresponding to where Mendoza's jurisdiction ends and yours begins, and the islands in the vicinity of those lands and provinces to be conquered and settled in said South Sea, as long as they lie within our demarcation.

Francisco began making preparations for acquiring and provisioning ships built in the shipyards of Biscay. Evidence suggests that it was ultimately his brother, the bishop, who assumed the financial burden and directed the expedition. Once preparations were completed, Camargo transferred his rights and command of the fleet on 24 January 1539 to friar Francisco de la Ribera, who, as governor, led the expedition composed of four ships, which departed from Seville in August 1539.

On 20 January 1540, the three ships that managed to arrive entered the Strait of Magellan, where they encountered a storm. Two days later, the flagship commanded by Ribera was sunk, although the crew was rescued. The remaining two vessels were separated by the storm, each drifting in different directions. The second ship, after ten months of hardship, barely managed to return to Spain, while the third ship, which carried a relative of Francisco de Camargo, Alonso de Camargo, successfully reached Peru by passing through the strait, possibly discovering the Beagle Channel and sighting Chiloé Island.

The fourth vessel, whose name is unknown and whose captain was probably Gonzalo de Alvarado, reportedly took possession of what are believed to be the Falkland Islands on 4 February 1540, where they wintered for five months before continuing their voyage and eventually returning to Spain.

The next attempt to colonize the area would not take place until 244 years later, when the expedition led by Juan de la Piedra explored the Bay Without Bottom (present-day Golfo Nuevo) and established the Fort of San José de la Candelaria in 1779. Though this expedition was once again destined for failure, it included figures who would later play prominent roles in the colonization of Patagonia, such as Rodrigo de Viedma and Basilio Villarino.

== Governorates in Hispanic America ==
After the territorial division of South America between Spain and Portugal, the Peruvian Hispanic administration was divided into six entities:

- Province of Tierra Firme, included the Caribbean Coast, Central America, the Pacific Coast of Colombia and Mexico.
- Governorate of New Castile, consisting of the territories from roughly the Ecuadorian-Colombian border in the north to Cuzco in the south.
- Governorate of New Toledo, forming the previous southern half of the Inca empire, stretching towards central Chile.
- Governorate of New Andalusia, which was not formally conquered by Spain until decades later.
- Governorate of New León, the southernmost part of the continent until the Strait of Magellan.
- Governorate of Terra Australis, territories from the south of the Strait of Magellan to the South Pole.

This territorial division set the basis for the Hispanic administration of South America for several decades. It was formally dissolved in 1544, when King Charles I sent his personal envoy, Blasco Núñez Vela, to govern the newly founded Viceroyalty of Peru that replaced the governorates.

== See also ==
- Patagonia#Early European exploration (1520–1669)
- Gutierre de Vargas Carvajal#Mecenas
