= Gutierre de Vargas Carvajal =

Roman Catholic prelate

- Bishop of Plasencia
- Appointed: May 25, 1524
- In office: 1524 – 1559
- Predecessor: Bernardino López de Carvajal
- Successor: Pedro Ponce de León

Personal details
- Born: 1506 Madrid, Kingdom of Castile, Crown of Castile
- Died: 1559 (aged 52–53) Jaraicejo, Kingdom of León, Crown of Castile
- Coat of arms

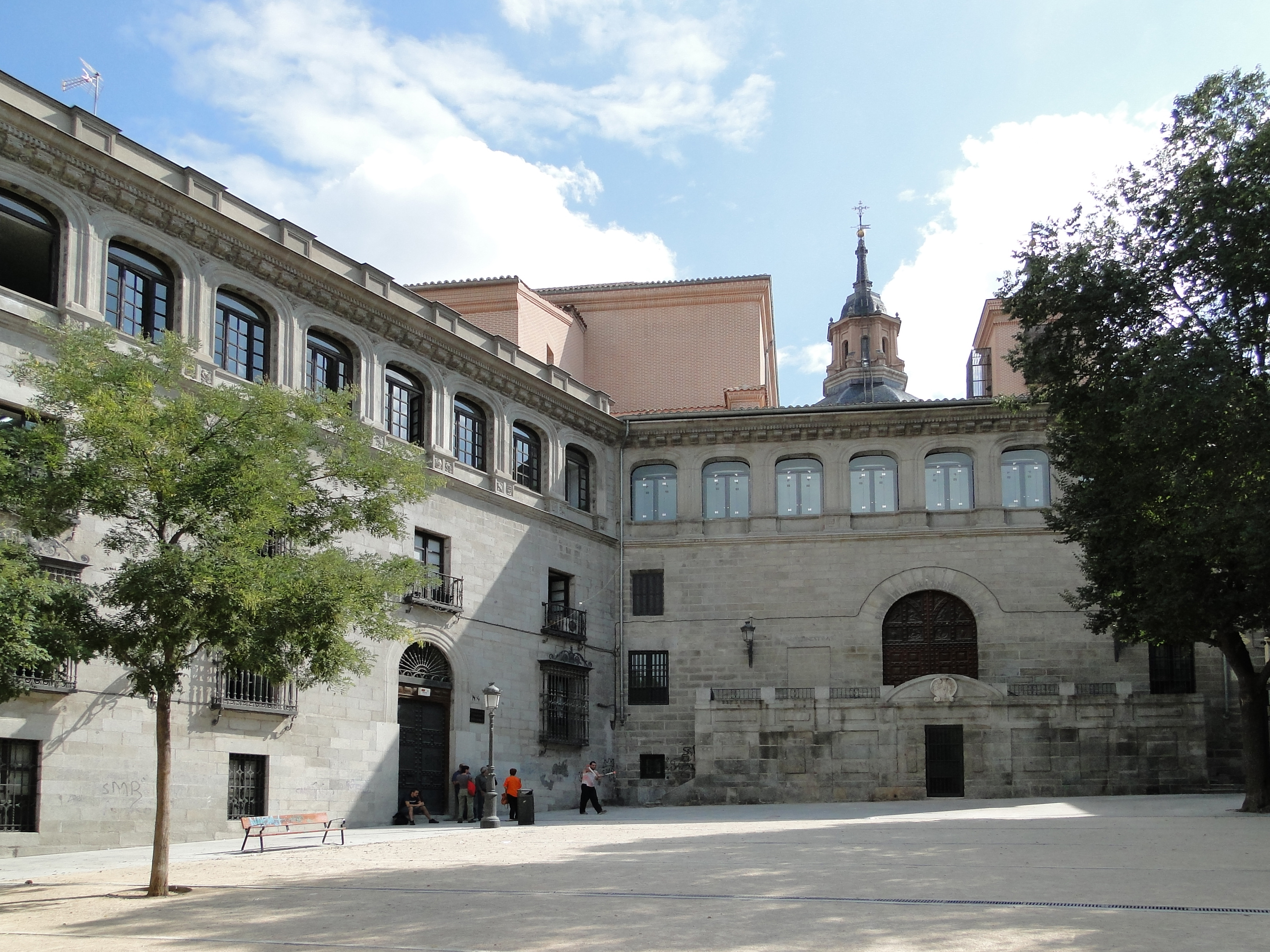
The Vargas Palace in Madrid (on the left) and the Bishop's Chapel (on the right)

Gutierre de Vargas Carvajal (1506–1559) was a Roman Catholic prelate who served as Bishop of Plasencia (1524–1559).

== Biography ==
Gutierre de Vargas Carvajal born in Madrid in 1506. On 25 May 1524, he was appointed during the papacy of Pope Clement VII as Bishop of Plasencia. He was a great builder of churches, organizer of ecclesiastical administration, and a patron of the arts. He financed a maritime expedition crossing the Straits of Magellan, and his intended purpose was to colonize and evangelize Patagonia. He gave the Governor title of the Governorate of New León to his brother, Francisco de Camargo. He served as Bishop of Plasencia until his death on 27 April 1559. He died in Jaraicejo (province of Cáceres), but was buried in Madrid. Gutierre was more fond of the mundane and military life than the religious life, which led him to constant conflicts with his cathedral part. According to F. J. García Mogollón, Gutierre spent some of his life "in the midst of great moral laxity, and we even know that he had a love affair with Magdalena de Mendoza, a lady from Toledo related to the Marquises of Almazán, who was the niece of Canon Carlos de Mendoza, Count of Castro, also a person of dissolute life." From that relationship, Gutierre gave birth to Francisco de Vargas y Mendoza, who was recognized as the son of Bishop Vargas Carvajal by King Philip II in 1561. While bishop, he was the principal co-consecrator of Fernando Valdés, Bishop of Elne (1529).

In 1551, Gutierre was sent to the Council of Trent by Charles I, where he met the Jesuits and read the Spiritual Exercises of Ignatius of Loyola, which completely changed his life. In Trent, he met Father Diego Laínez (a Jesuit) and Francis Borgia. Laínez commented to Ignatius of Loyola in 1552, in Trent, about Gutierre de Vargas: "...not to fail with the Placentinian, because he is a Spaniard and fellow countryman, and almost a man of war, such that by force of arms he would make us answer, if we did not want to do so willingly." From then on, Gutierre led a morally irreproachable life.

Gutierre fell ill with gout and died on April 27, 1559. His body was transferred to Madrid where it was buried in the chapel of Santa Maria and San Juan de Letran. This chapel had been founded by his father and completed by Gutierre himself in 1535. It has been known as the Chapel of the Bishop of Plasencia or simply the Bishop's Chapel ever since. The chapel's facade displays the name "Chapel of Our Lady and San Juan de Letran". In his will, the bishop is referred to as Gutierre Carvajal y Vargas.

The main inscription on the bishop's alabaster cenotaph is as follows: "Here lies the most reverend Lord Gutierre de Vargas Carvajal, Bishop of Plasencia, second son of Lord Francisco de Vargas, a member of the council of the Catholic Monarchs, and Queen Joanna, and Inés de Carvajal, his parents. With the help of his chief chaplain and 12 other chaplains, he rebuilt and endowed this chapel in honor and glory of God. In the year 1556, he passed from this life to eternal life.''(sic)

== Promoter of Church Construction ==
Gutierre was very intelligent in the art of architecture, which great lords are commonly fond of. He promoted the construction or renovation of numerous rural churches in his diocese of Plasencia. The list is long and includes churches in Malpartida de Plasencia, Oliva and Villar de Plasencia, Majadas, Serrejón, Saucedilla, Almaraz, Navalmoral de la Mata, Tejeda, Villanueva, Robledillo and Losar de la Vera, Jaraicejo, Garciaz, Ibahernando, Berzocana, San Martín and Santa María de Trujillo, Zorita, Escurial, Madrigalejo, Guareña, Santa Cecilia de Medellín and Santiago de Don Benito. In 1555, he established the Santa Ana College of the Society of Jesus in Plasencia, which comprises a college and a church. He also established the Christ of the Battles shrine, the Holy Cross or St. Roch hospital, and the Capuchin sisters' convent in Plasencia in 1556.

== Organizer of Ecclesiastical Administration ==
In 1534, he called a diocesan synod in Jaraicejo (Cáceres), in which he anticipated the reforms that he would propose at the Council of Trent regarding the ordination and administration of dioceses. The 107 articles of the synodal constitutions covered a variety of subjects, including the establishment of baptismal registers in every parish, recurrent visits by the prelate to the towns, the lives of the clergy, and the tithe.

== Mecenas ==
Between 1539 and 1541, Bishop Vargas provided funding for a three-ship naval expedition known as the "Armada of the Bishop of Plasencia" that was led by Friar Francisco de la Ribera, the newly appointed governor of Nueva León. The expedition set sail from Seville in August 1539, with the aim of crossing the Strait of Magellan, colonizing and evangelizing Patagonia, and reaching the coasts of Peru. Only one ship succeeded, the one commanded by his relative, Alonso de Camargo, which sighted the archipelago of Chiloé and managed to reach Arequipa (Peru).

== External links and additional sources ==
- Cheney, David M. "Diocese of Plasencia". Catholic-Hierarchy.org. (for Chronology of Bishops) ^{[self-published]}
- Chow, Gabriel. "Diocese of Plasencia (Spain)". GCatholic.org. (for Chronology of Bishops) ^{[self-published]}

Catholic Church titles
Preceded by Bernardino López de Carvajal y Sande	Bishop of Plasencia; 1524–1559	Succeeded by Pedro Ponce de León (bishop of Plasencia)
