= Alonso de Camargo =

Spanish naval officer (1500–1546)

- Born: 1500; Trujillo, Crown of Castile
- Died: 1546 (aged 45–46); Viceroyalty of Peru, Spanish Empire
- Occupations: Navigator, naval officer, explorer
- Parent(s): Luis de Camargo (father); Beatriz Álvarez (mother)
- Relatives: Gutierre de Vargas Carvajal (relative); Francisco de Camargo (relative)

Alonso de Camargo (b. Trujillo, Crown of Castile, 1500 – d. Viceroyalty of Peru, Spanish Empire, 1546) was a 16th-century Spanish naval officer and navigator who, in 1539, commanded one of the three ships—its name now lost but later renamed Incógnita—in the expedition known as the Armada of the Bishop of Plasencia. The expedition was financed by the bishop himself, who was his relative, and led by friar Francisco de la Ribera. Its objective was to settle in Tierra del Fuego and cross to the Pacific Ocean. Although the settlement attempt failed, Camargo's ship, the Incógnita, is believed to have accidentally discovered the Falkland Islands, which he named the Islands of Samson, in early 1540. He is also believed to have reached the Pacific coast later that same year after successfully navigating through the Strait of Magellan to arrive in Peru. He was the son of Luis de Camargo and Beatriz Álvarez, and a relative of Francisco de Camargo.

== Expedition to South America ==
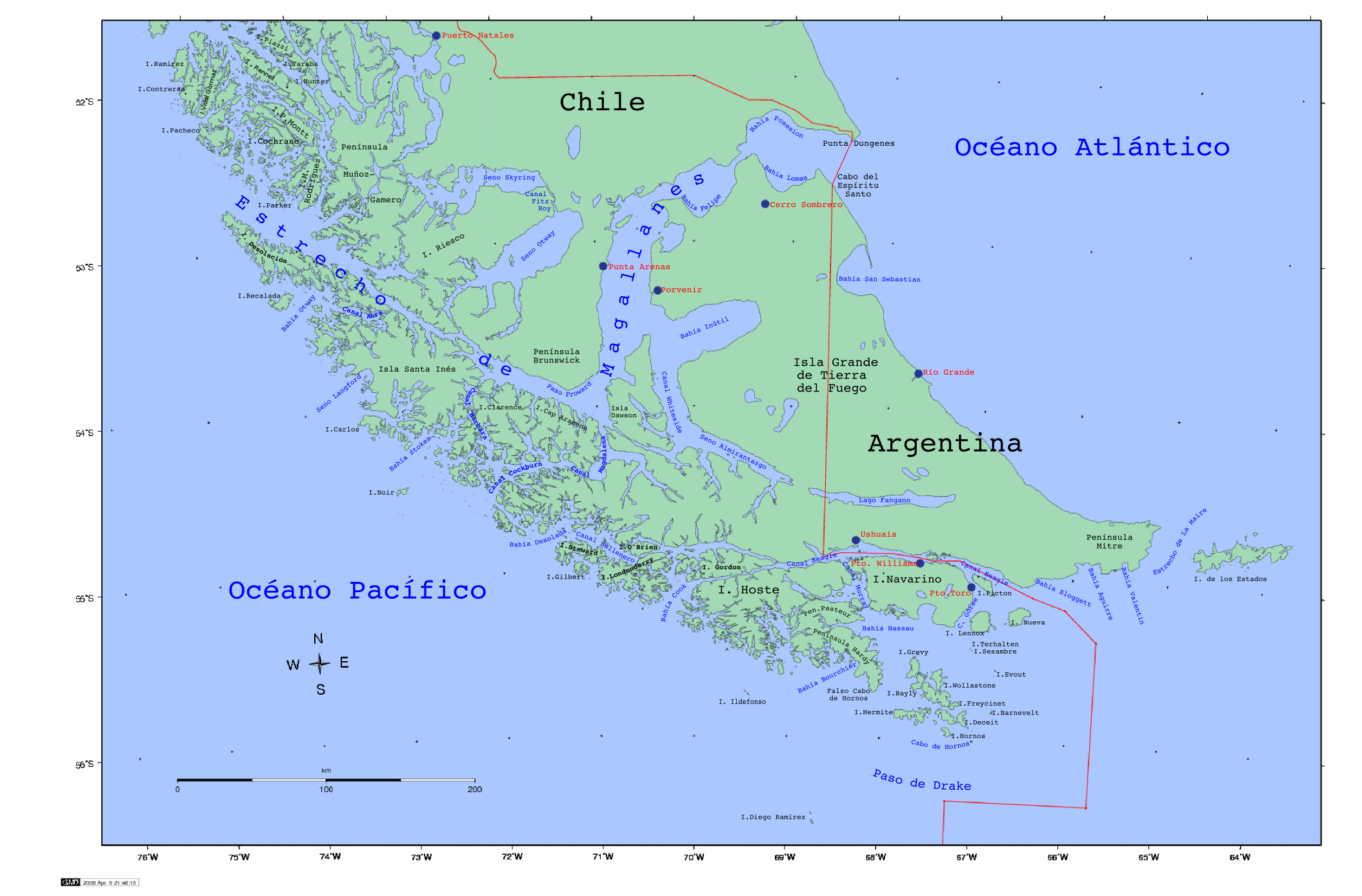
Strait of Magellan, crossed by Alonso de Camargo.

Alonso de Camargo was likely born in the city of Trujillo, part of the Crown of Castile under the Hispanic Monarchy, around 1509, during the reign of Charles I of Spain following the union with the Crown of Aragon.

He departed for Santa Marta on 28 March 1536 after obtaining a royal license to do so. He later appears in Peru, having entered through the Río de la Plata alongside Governor Diego de Rojas. He became a city councillor ("regidor") and resident of Quito, and was an hidalgo. It appears he was granted a royal decree to colonize Chile prior to Pedro de Valdivia, although the plan was never carried out.

Camargo set sail from Seville in August 1539 as part of an expedition of three or four ships, led nominally by friar Francisco de la Ribera, titular adelantado of New León, (Note: Other sources state that he departed from Sanlúcar de Barrameda on 19 September.) with the goal of exploring the Strait of Magellan and colonizing Tierra del Fuego. The expedition was financed by his relative Gutierre de Vargas Carvajal (1506–1559), Bishop of Plasencia—a relative of Camargo and brother of Francisco de Camargo. (Note: Sometimes confused as the same person, though some sources distinguish them as two individuals.)

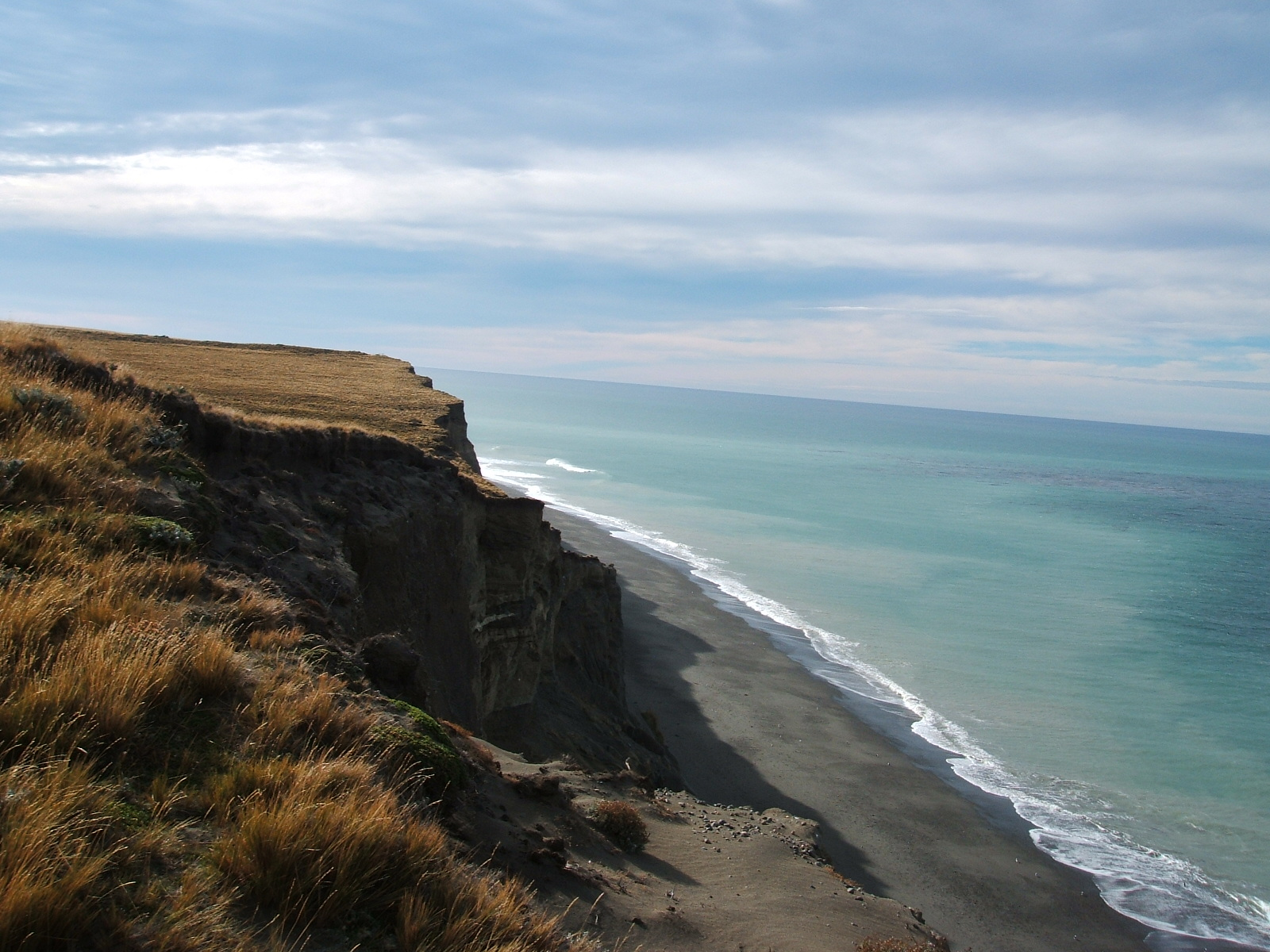
Cape Virgenes.

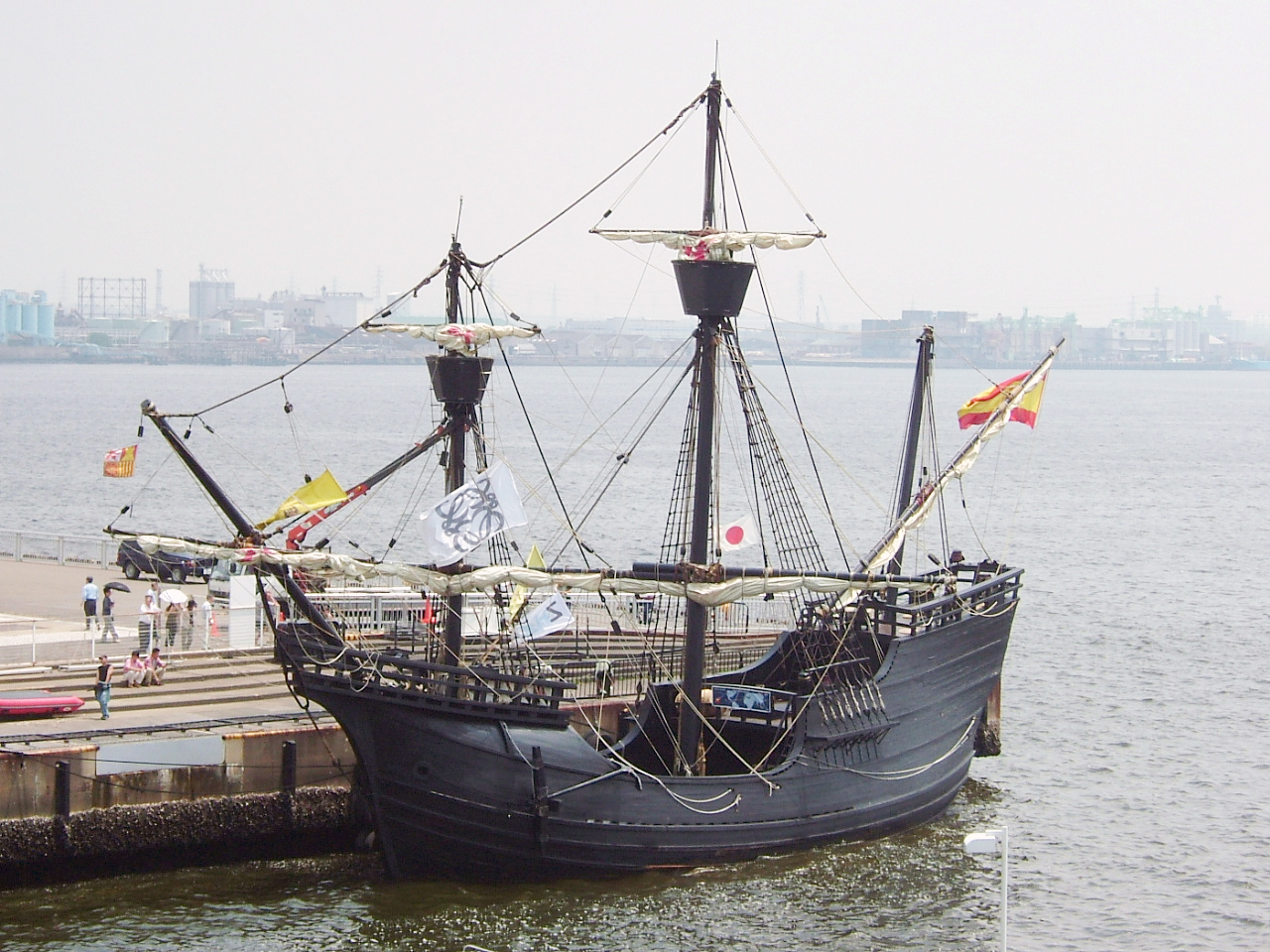
Replica of the Nao Victoria, similar to Camargo’s Incógnita, used by Magellan’s fleet in 1522.

Upon sighting Cape Virgenes on 12 January 1540, the ships anchored there, but strong winds pushed them more than 60 leagues offshore. The ship under Alonso de Camargo’s command reached what are believed to be the Falkland Islands.

Meanwhile, the flagship commanded by Francisco de la Ribera entered the Strait on 20 January and managed to pass the first narrows, but upon reaching the second, amid rough seas and hurricane-force winds, the vessel was lost. The crew—about 150 men—along with Ribera, managed to reach the coast using small boats but were left stranded on the continental shores of the Strait.

These men moved inland into Patagonia, led by captain Sebastián de Argüello, since the fledgling adelantado Francisco de la Ribera died shortly thereafter. It has been said—though without any evidence—that they were the founders of a city in Patagonia.

The other vessel, under the command of Gonzalo de Alvarado, a veteran of the Río de la Plata, battled the wind and waves for days, and after losing its anchor, was forced to spend six months at Cape Virgenes, from which it returned to Spain in November 1540.

The ship commanded by Alonso de Camargo, whose name has been lost and is referred to by some historians as Incógnita, managed to pass through the Strait and sighted the coasts of Chiloé. It later reached the recently founded city of Arequipa sometime after 15 August 1540.

== Participation in the Civil Wars of the Conquerors of Peru and Death ==
Upon his arrival in Peru, Alonso de Camargo sided with the royalists in defense of the King of Spain, as the Camargo family were noble supporters of the Crown during the context of the civil wars among the conquerors. In 1541, he commanded the ship that transported the forces of Pedro Álvarez Holguín to defend Arequipa from Diego de Almagro II. He later went to Cuzco under the orders of Cristóbal Vaca de Castro, and while in Chuquisaca alongside Diego Centeno, they killed Francisco de Almendras, who was stationed there under orders of the rebel Gonzalo Pizarro.

In 1546, after numerous battles against the rebels, he was defeated by Francisco de Carvajal at the Battle of Pocona, taken prisoner by the rebels. Although Carvajal spared his life, Camargo did not yield: once free, he conspired against him and attempted to stab him upon leaving church. As a result, he was sentenced to death for conspiracy.

== The Legend of the City of the Caesars ==
It is said that they were the founders of the legendary Patagonian city, the City of the Caesars, also known as Trapalanda or the Enchanted City. Stories and legends about the fate of these castaways began to spread throughout Chile, Buenos Aires, and the Tucumán region. Some Amerindians claimed to have encountered Argüello and other companions of friar Francisco.

In 1589, the Governor of Tucumán, Juan Ramírez de Velazco, took testimony from indigenous witnesses who claimed to have seen the people of "Trapalanda" in their wondrous city. In 1620, two sailors traveled through Chile claiming they had been expelled from the "Enchanted City". Historically, however, none of these accounts has ever been verified.
