= Capitulations of 1534 =

Governorates of the Spanish Empire

Following the conquest of Peru, King Charles I concluded that it was essential to update the Capitulation of Toledo (26 July 1529), in order to administer the territories located between the southern limit of the Governorate of New Castile and the Strait of Magellan.

Spanish Governorates in South America in 1539.

On 21 May 1534, the Spanish monarch created three capitulations to formalize the responsibilities for the conquest of the southern part of the South American continent:

- The Governorate of New Toledo, granted to Diego de Almagro, comprised two hundred leagues stretching from the 14th parallel south—the southern limit of the Governorate of New Castile (established in the Capitulation of Toledo)—to the 25°31’31’’ parallel south, near what is today the Chilean city of Taltal.
- The Governorate of New Andalusia, granted to Pedro de Mendoza, stretched from the Atlantic Ocean to the Pacific Ocean—at those latitudes, the Treaty of Tordesillas (7) placed the border with Portugal in the middle of the Atlantic—and comprised two hundred leagues from the southern limit of New Toledo to the 36°57’09’’ parallel south, in Arauco.
- The Governorate of New León, granted to Simón de Alcazaba, also stretched from ocean to ocean and comprised two hundred leagues from the southern limit of New Andalusia to the 48°22’52’’ parallel south, at the Chilean Campana Island. Shortly after its creation, it was transferred to Francisco de Camargo in 1536 and extended to the Strait of Magellan across both oceans.

On 24, the Spanish monarch created a fourth capitulation:

- The Governorate of Terra Australis, granted to Pedro Sancho de la Hoz, encompassed the territories south of the Strait of Magellan.

== Territorial evolution ==
1529-1534

1534-1536

1536-1539

1539
