= Simón de Alcazaba y Sotomayor =

Portuguese navigator and explorer serving Spain

Adelantado and Governor of New León
- In office 21 May 1534 / 9 March – May 1535
- Monarch: Charles I of Spain
- Preceded by: New office
- Succeeded by: Two nominal successors: Francisco de Camargo (1536); Francisco de la Ribera (1539)

Personal details
- Born: 1470 Kingdom of Portugal
- Died: 1535 (aged 64–65) Puerto de los Leones, Governorate of New León, East Patagonia, Spanish Empire
- Occupation: Adelantado, navigator, explorer, Conquistador, colonial Governor
- Known for: Founder of the short-lived Puerto de los Leones (February–late 1535)

Simón de Alcazaba y Sotomayor (b. Kingdom of Portugal, 1470 – Puerto de los Leones, East Patagonia, Spanish Empire, May 1535) was a Portuguese navigator and explorer who was appointed by Charles V, emperor of the Holy Roman Empire, as adelantado and governor of New León. In this role, he founded the first European settlement in Patagonia and the second in what is now Argentina, one year before Pedro de Mendoza attempted the first foundation of Buenos Aires.

== Biography up to the South American voyage ==
=== Family origins and early years ===
Simón de Alcazaba y Sotomayor was born in 1470 somewhere in the Kingdom of Portugal. He later entered the service of the House of Habsburg in 1522.

=== Capitulations with the Spanish Crown ===
Capitulations of Toledo of 1529 granted by the Spanish queen to Francisco Pizarro and Simón de Alcazaba

Spanish capitulations in South America established in 1534

By the Capitulation of Toledo, signed on July 26, 1529, by Queen Isabella of Portugal, consort of Charles V, 200 leagues southward from the mouth of the Santiago River (1°20'N to 9°57'S) were granted to Francisco Pizarro to form the Governorate of New Castilla.

Excerpt from the Capitulation of Simón de Alcazaba (1529):

Firstly, that we grant you license, as we hereby do, so that in our name and that of the Royal Crown of Castile, you may conquer, pacify, and populate the lands and provinces along the said coast of the South Sea, within the said two hundred leagues nearest to the limits of the governorship we have entrusted to Don Pedro de Mendoza. You must carry this out within six months from the date hereof, setting sail with the necessary ships to transport, and with them, one hundred and fifty men from our kingdoms of Castile or other permitted parts. Within a year and a half, and thereafter, you shall be bound to continue and complete the said voyage with another one hundred men, with religious persons and clerics, and with our officials, who will be assigned by our order for the conversion of the Indians to our Holy Faith and the safeguarding of our wealth. You shall provide and pay for the freight and provisions required by these religious persons, according to their status, all at your own expense, and you shall not charge them anything during the entire voyage, which we strongly urge you to do and fulfill, as a service to God and to us, for otherwise we shall consider you to have failed us (...)

=== Expedition to Patagonia ===
Juan de Mori, who held key positions among the expedition’s sailors —including as guardian of Alcazaba's illegitimate younger son— wrote a Report on the events of Simón de Alcazaba’s expedition to the Strait of Magellan, from his departure from Sanlúcar de Barrameda until his arrival in Santo Domingo.

Alcazaba departed from the port of Sanlúcar de Barrameda on September 21, 1534, leading an expedition of 250 men aboard two ships: the one he commanded, Madre de Dios, and the San Pedro, captained by Rodrigo Martínez.

In early January 1535, the San Pedro made landfall in what is now Bahía Gil, where they stocked up on sea lion meat and fat, as well as fish. By the end of the month, the Madre de Dios reached the Strait of Magellan as far as the first narrows, intending to cross to the Pacific Ocean, but severe weather forced the expedition to retreat northward, sailing along the Atlantic coast back to the aforementioned bay.

== Adelantado and Governor of New León ==
=== Foundation of Puerto de los Leones ===
On February 24, 1535, Adelantado Alcazaba had himself sworn in as governor of New León and founded a settlement called "Puerto de los Leones" at what is now Caleta Hornos —located 29 km south of present-day Camarones, in Chubut Province.

"For ten days they built a village with a small church where mass was held daily. On March 9, 1535, the adelantado assembled the troops and settlers, blessed the flags, read the royal decrees, and swore everyone to loyalty to the king and to himself as governor. Thus, the province of New León was founded, and a caravan toward the interior was immediately launched."

Shortly afterward, Alcazaba and 200 men set off into inland eastern Patagonia to try to reach the Pacific by land. They reached the present-day Chico River, which they named Guadalquivir, and there they encountered Tehuelche natives who guided them for ten days toward a supposed city of gold.

=== Death at the hands of mutineers ===
Unfortunately, the expedition found only barren lands. This sparked fury among the men, who were exhausted, hungry, and frustrated after walking long distances without success. Upon returning to the settlement, a mutiny broke out in April, followed by another in May 1535, during which Simón de Alcazaba was assassinated.

=== Last settlers of the colony ===
The settlement was abandoned by the mutineers on June 17 of that same year, leaving behind some inhabitants who had been exiled there. These survivors remained until the end of the year.

From the latitude at which Pizarro's jurisdiction ended, another 200 leagues southward (to approximately 21°6.5' S) were granted to Simón de Alcazaba y Sotomayor, appointing him as governor, captain general, adelantado, and chief constable of the Governorate of New León. However, Alcazaba y Sotomayor was unable to carry out the expedition, and between 1530 and 1531, the king planned to hand over the territories from Chincha to the Strait of Magellan to the Fugger family of Germany.

On May 4, 1534, King Charles V expanded the territories granted to Pizarro by an additional 70 leagues to the south, into lands previously assigned to Alcazaba y Sotomayor, reaching approximately 14°S.

On May 21, 1534, the king signed three additional capitulations to explore and occupy American territories, establishing provinces or governorates each 200 leagues long north to south. Among these was the Governorate of New León, granted to Simón de Alcazaba y Sotomayor, extending from the Atlantic Ocean to the Pacific, south of the 35°S parallel to the Strait of Magellan.
