= Francisco de Camargo =

16th-century Spanish navigator, explorer, and commander

Adelantado of the Governorate of New León

Lord of Oliva de Plasencia
- In office 6 November 1536 – 24 January 1539
- Preceded by: Simón de Alcazaba y Sotomayor
- Succeeded by: Francisco de la Ribera

Personal details
- Born: c. 16th Century Trujillo, Crown of Castile
- Died: 16th Century
- Spouse: María de Ocampo y Sotomayor
- Children: Inés
- Parents: Francisco de Vargas y Medina (father); Inés de Carvajal y Camargo (mother)
- Relatives: Gutierre de Vargas Carvajal (brother); Alonso de Camargo (relative)

Francisco de Camargo, also known as Francisco de Vargas y Camargo (c. 16th Century Trujillo – 16th Century), was a 16th-century Spanish navigator, explorer, and commander. He served as adelantado of the Governorate of New León. He was lord of Oliva de Plasencia, the third son of Francisco de Vargas y Medina and Inés de Carvajal y Camargo, and the brother of Gutierre de Vargas Carvajal, bishop of Plasencia. He was also a relative of Alonso de Camargo. He married María de Ocampo y Sotomayor, with whom he had a daughter, Inés de Camargo. Inés later married Juan de Vargas Carvajal, a knight of the Order of Santiago and royal advisor to Kings Charles I and Philip I of Spain.

== Governorate of New León ==
Map of the Governorate of New León, expanded in 1536 under Francisco de Camargo, reaching the Strait of Magellan.

After the death of Simón de Alcazaba y Sotomayor in Patagonia in 1535, Francisco de Camargo attempted to navigate the Strait of Magellan in 1536, but his flagship ran aground in the Primera Angostura. This event later gave rise to the legend of the City of the Caesars.

That same year, he received the royal grant to settle the Strait region thanks to his brother, Bishop Gutierre de Vargas Carvajal, who transferred to him the official rights of a royal capitulation originally issued by Charles I of Spain. This concession authorized the conquest and colonization of lands stretching from the 36th parallel south to the Strait of Magellan.

Camargo was appointed as adelantado, governor, and lifelong captain general, as well as alguacil mayor (chief constable) and lieutenant of three fortresses he was obliged to build. He was also authorized to name a successor after three years of service.

(...) Whereas you, Francisco de Camargo, resident and councilman of the city of Plasencia, our servant, moved by your great will to serve us and to advance the Crown of Castile, offer yourself to go conquer and settle the lands and provinces yet to be conquered and settled along the coast of the South Sea, from the end of the two hundred leagues granted as governorship to Don Pedro de Mendoza, down to the Strait of Magellan; and including the entire coastal and inland region of said strait, around to the other sea up to the degree corresponding to where Mendoza's jurisdiction ends and yours begins, and the islands in the vicinity of those lands and provinces to be conquered and settled in said South Sea, as long as they lie within our demarcation.

Francisco began making preparations for acquiring and provisioning ships built in the shipyards of Biscay. Evidence suggests that it was ultimately his brother, the bishop, who assumed the financial burden and directed the expedition. Once preparations were completed, Camargo transferred his rights and command of the fleet on 24 January 1539 to friar Francisco de la Ribera, who, as governor, led the expedition composed of four ships, which departed from Seville in August 1539.

On 20 January 1540, the three ships that managed to arrive entered the Strait of Magellan, where they encountered a storm. Two days later, the flagship commanded by Ribera was sunk, although the crew was rescued. The remaining two vessels were separated by the storm, each drifting in different directions. The second ship, after ten months of hardship, barely managed to return to Spain, while the third ship, which carried a relative of Francisco de Camargo, (Note: Sometimes they are confused as the same person, but other sources treat them as two distinct individuals.) Alonso de Camargo, successfully reached Peru by passing through the strait, possibly discovering the Beagle Channel and sighting Chiloé Island.

The fourth vessel, whose name is unknown and whose captain was probably Gonzalo de Alvarado, reportedly took possession of what are believed to be the Falkland Islands on 4 February 1540, where they wintered for five months before continuing their voyage and eventually returning to Spain.

The next attempt to colonize the area would not take place until 244 years later, when the expedition led by Juan de la Piedra explored the Bay Without Bottom (present-day Golfo Nuevo) and established the Fort of San José de la Candelaria in 1779. Though this expedition was once again destined for failure, it included figures who would later play prominent roles in the colonization of Patagonia, such as Rodrigo de Viedma and Basilio Villarino.
