= Francisco de la Ribera =

Spanish friar and sailor of the 16th Century

Adelantado of the New León
- In office January 24, 1539 – January 29, 1540
- Preceded by: Francisco de Camargo
- Succeeded by: Last

Personal details
- Born: 16th century Spain
- Died: January 29, 1540; Strait of Magellan

Francisco de la Ribera (Spain, early 16th century – Strait of Magellan, January 29, 1540) was a Spanish sailor of the 16th century, who was part of the 1540 Plasencia bishop Armada to the Strait of Magellan, where he died.

== Biography ==
Map of the Governorate of New León, sharing border with the Governorate of Terra Australis, while Francisco de la Ribera was the nominal Governor.

The friar Francisco de la Ribera was the captain of the flagship of a fleet of four ships organized and financed by Gutierre de Vargas Carvajal, Bishop of Plasencia, with the aim of reaching the Strait of Magellan. Following the resignation of Francisco de Camargo from the Governorate of New León, de la Ribera was appointed adelantado of the territory.

The expedition departed from Seville in August 1539 and reached the mouth of the strait in January 1540. However, once inside, a violent storm sank the flagship. From that moment on, the 150 men aboard, including its captain, were never heard from again. De la Ribera died on January 29 of that year.

The tragedy gave rise to several legends. It was said that some of the castaways, including Ribera, were rescued by indigenous Patagones, who led them to fabulous mines. According to accounts from other survivors such as Melchor Ramírez, this was the supposed location of the mythical city of Trapalanda or the City of the Caesars. Thus, the disappearance of Francisco de la Ribera’s ship and the lack of news contributed to the growth of the myth of the southern El Dorado.

== See also ==
- City of the Caesars
- Governorate of New León
- Francisco de Camargo
- Strait of Magellan
