= Basilio Villarino =

Spanish captain and explorer

- Born: 1741
- Died: 1785 (aged 43–44)
- Military career
- Rank: Captain

Basilio Villarino (1741 – 1785) was a captain of the Spanish Royal Navy who traveled around the southern tip of South America. In 1837 some of his writings were published as Diario de la Navegación Emprendida en 1781, Desde el Rio Negro, para Reconocer la Bahia de Todos los Santos, las Islas del Buen Suceso, y el Desague del Rio Colorado.

== Early life ==
Basilio Villarino was born in Noia, Spain, in 1741.

== Voyages ==
In 1773 Villarino arrived to the Rio de la Plata as assistant pilot of the frigate Perpetua, commanded by Captain Bustillos. From 1778 he performed a detailed reconnaissance of Patagonia, during which he explored the sea shores and the rivers Negro, Colorado, Limay and Deseado among others.

In 1779 he participated in the expedition led by Francisco de Viedma, during which the town of Carmen de Patagones was founded; in 1782 he navigated the rivers Negro, Limay and Collón Curá in four chalupas called San Jose, San Juan, San Francisco de Asis and Champagne, accompanied by a local chieftain. In 1783 he discovered the Choele Choel island, although the exploration was suspended due to the permanent attack of the natives.

== Death ==
Villarino was killed by the aboriginals in January 1785, during an expedition to Sierra de la Ventana commanded by Juan de la Piedra.

== Legacy ==
In Argentina, Villarino's legacy as an explorer of Patagonia has been recognized by naming several places after him, including: a lake and a river in Neuquén, a department subdivision in Buenos Aires (Villarino Partido), and some schools.

An Argentine Navy 1880s steamer, ARA Villarino, used on the Patagonian routes, was named after him. In May 1880, the transport ship repatriated the remains of General José de San Martín from France.

== See also ==
- ARA Villarino - Argentine Navy 1880s armed transport ship
- Villarino Lake - in Neuquen, Argentina
