= Captaincy General of Chile =

1541–1818 territory of the Spanish Empire

Coordinates: 33.45°S 70.666667°W

General Captaincy of Chile Kingdom of Chile Capitanía General de Chile Reino de Chile (Spanish)
- 1541–1810; 1814–1818
- Coat of arms of Santiago
- Motto: Plus ultra "Further Beyond"
- Anthem: Marcha Real "Royal March"
- Flags of Spain (Note: First national flag, naval and fortress flag, the last flag to float in the continental Americas.) (left) and the Cross of Burgundy (Note: Military flag.) (right)

- Maximum approximate extent of general captaincy. Under effective control in 1786. Territories belonging to until 1786. Hatched: Spanish possessions without effective control.

- Territory legally belonging (with or without effective control) to the General Captaincy or Kingdom of Chile in 1810 highlighting the historiographical disputes surrounding it, as well as the Araucanía, a territory under indigenous self-government that belongs to Chile.
- Status: Kingdoms of Indies and Captaincy General of the Hispanic Monarchy
- Capital: Santiago
- Common languages: Castilian Spanish (official); Indigenous languages (Quechuan languages, Aymara, Mapudungun, Kawésqar, Yaghan)
- Religion: Catholicism
- Government: Monarchy
- King
  - 1541–1556: Charles I
  - 1808–1810: Joseph I
  - 1814–1818: Ferdinand VII
- Royal Governor
  - 1541–1553: Pedro de Valdivia
  - 1808–1810: Francisco García Carrasco
  - 1815–1818: Casimiro Marcó del Pont
- Historical era: Spanish Empire
  - Established: 1541
  - First Government Junta: September 18, 1810
  - Spanish Reconquest: October 2, 1814
  - Chilean Independence: February 12 1818
- Currency: Spanish Real
Preceded by	Succeeded by
Viceroyalty of Peru; Prehispanic history of Chile	Old Fatherland; New Fatherland
- Today part of: Chile; Argentina

The General Captaincy of Chile (Capitanía General de Chile [kapitaˈni.a xeneˈɾal de ˈtʃile]), Governorate of Chile, or Kingdom of Chile, was a territory of the Spanish Empire (Hispanic Monarchy) from 1541 to 1818 that was, initially, part of the Viceroyalty of Peru. It comprised most of modern-day Chile and southern parts of Argentina in the Patagonia region. Its capital was Santiago de Chile. In 1811, it declared itself independent. Spain reconquered the territory in 1814; but, in 1818, it gained independence as the Republic of Chile. It had a number of Spanish governors over its long history and several kings.

== Name ==
The Captaincy General of Chile was incorporated to the Crown of Castile as were all the other Spanish possessions in the New World. The Captaincy General of Chile was first known as New Extremadura (a name subsequently given to a part of Mexico) and then as Indian Flanders.

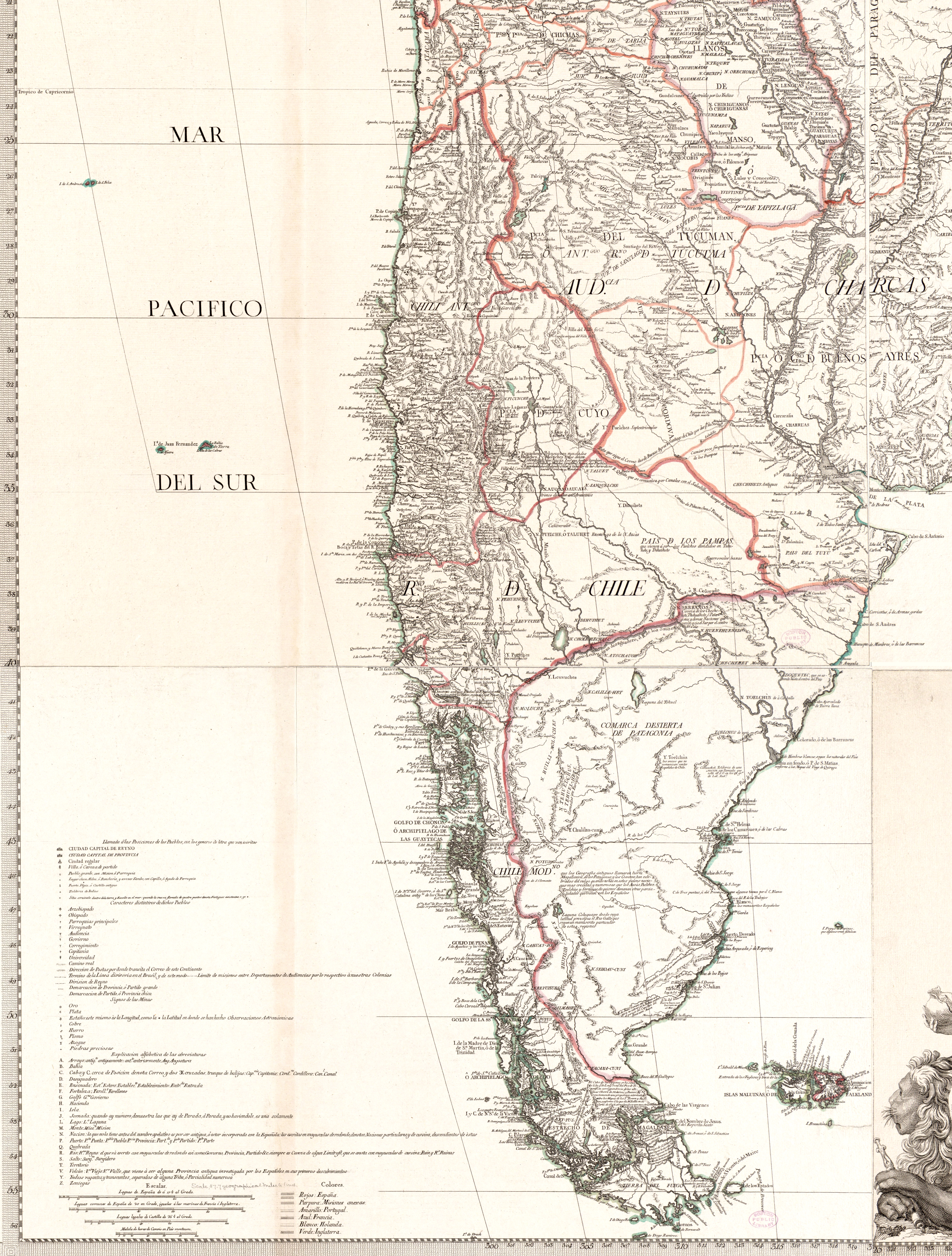
Kingdom of Chile in the Juan de la Cruz Cano y Olmedilla 1775 map.

Benjamín Vicuña Mackenna noted that Chile has always been officially and unofficially the Kingdom of Chile. In 1575, Pedro Marino de Lobera “Corregidor de Valdivia” wrote the Chronicles of the Kingdom of Chile. Other publications of the 16th, 17th, and 18th centuries confirm the name and/or status of what is known as the Kingdom. However, although the status of kingdom was officially used and recognized in Court the jurisdiction of the kingdom was still under Spanish control for most of its existence, later it became a republic.

Like the other Spanish colonies, the administrative apparatus of the Captaincy General of Chile was subordinate to the Council of the Indies and the Laws of the Indies. The day-to-day work was handled mostly by viceroys and governors, who represented the king in the overseas territories.

There's no agreement on the origin of the name Chile. According to Quechua nobleman Felipe Guamán Poma de Ayala, the word "Chile" came from the Quechua term "Chili". On the other hand, the Spanish soldier Alonso González de Najera claimed that the Indigenous people in the region told him that Chile means "cold." Other theories say that people from the Inca Empire, who spoke Aymara, called the area "Chilli", meaning "Southernmost land," "the center of the Earth," or "deepest land."

== History ==
=== Exploration and conquest ===
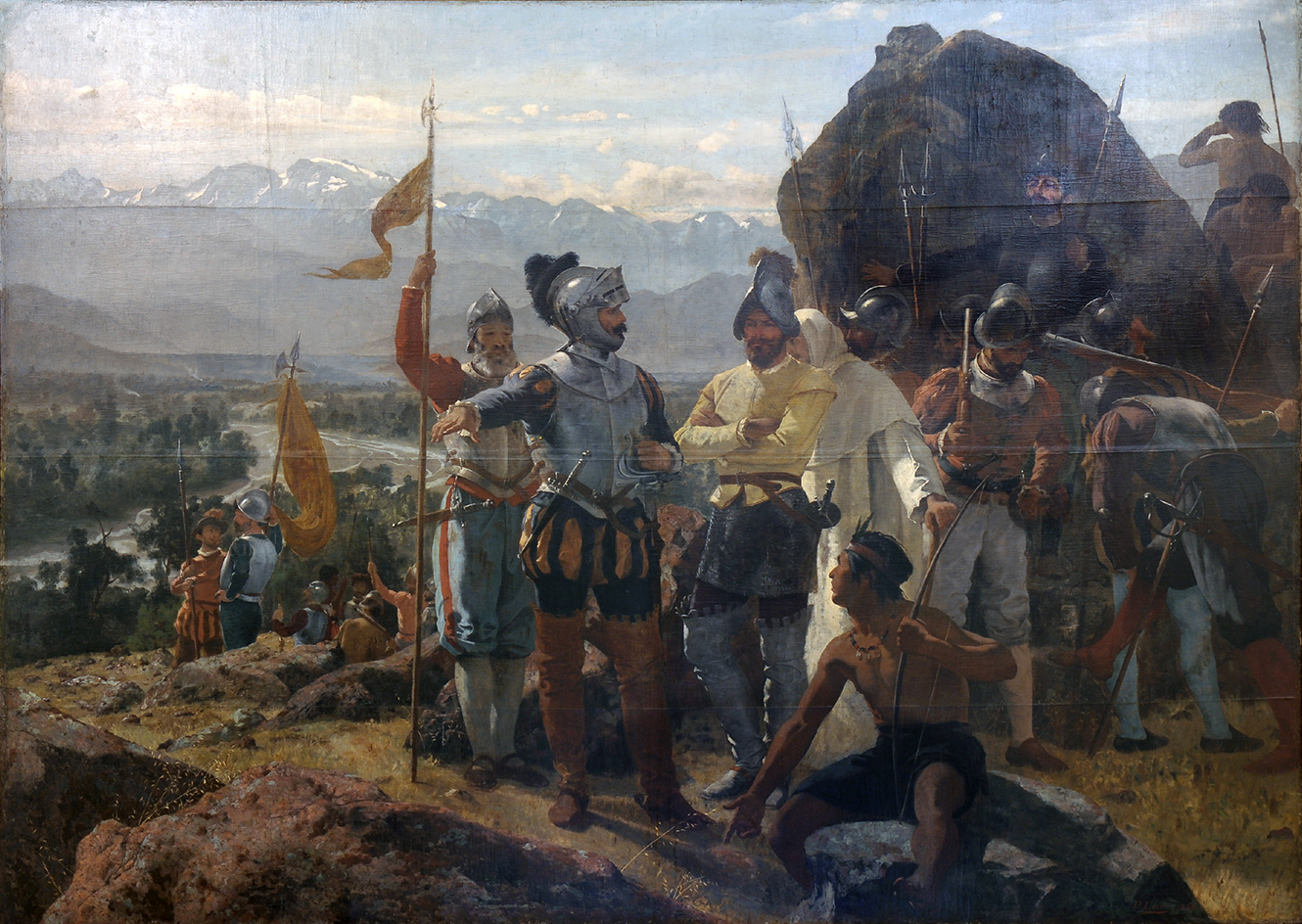
Founding of Santiago in 1541.

In 1536, Diego de Almagro formed the first expedition to explore the territories to the south of the Inca Empire, which had been granted to him as the Governorship of New Toledo. After Almargo's death, Pedro de Valdivia solicited and was granted in 1539 the right to explore and conquer the area with Francisco Pizarro's approval.

Valdivia founded the city of Santiago del Nuevo Extremo in 1541 in an Inca settlement and a few months later its cabildo (municipal council) appointed him governor and Captain General of New Extremadura on June 11, 1541. Other cities founded during Valdivia's administration were Concepción in 1550, La Imperial in 1551, Santa María Magdalena de Villa Rica and Santa María la Blanca de Valdivia in 1552, and the following year Los Confines and Santiago del Estero on the eastern side of the Andes. In 1553 Valdivia also founded a series of forts for protection of the settled areas: San Felipe de Araucan, San Juan Bautista de Purén and San Diego de Tucapel.

After Valdivia's death that same year, these last forts, Villarica and Concepcion were lost and they were recovered following the war with Lautaro and Caupolicán. Following the defeat of the Mapuche by García Hurtado de Mendoza, settlements continued to grow and more cities were founded: Cañete de la Frontera on the site of the former Fort San Diego de Tucapel and Villa de San Mateo de Osorno in 1558, San Andrés de Angol in 1560, Ciudad de Mendoza del Nuevo Valle de La Rioja in 1561, San Luis de Loyola Nueva Medina de Rioseco and San Juan de la Frontera in 1562, and Santiago de Castro in 1567. Martín García Óñez de Loyola founded a last city south of the Bio Bio River, Santa Cruz de Coya, in 1595.

In 1557 and 1558 Juan Ladrillero explored the Strait of Magellan. At Cape Possession, where he arrived on August 9, 1558, he performed the ceremony of taking possession of it for the King of Spain and Chile.

=== Collapse of southern Chile ===
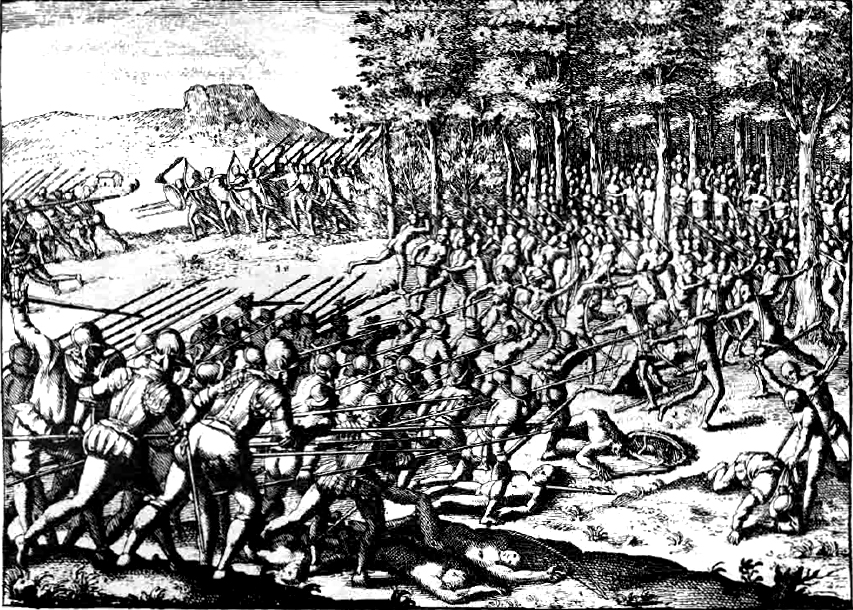
Illustration of the Arauco War in Jerónimo de Vivar's book Crónica y relación copiosa y verdadera de los reynos de Chile (1558).

A Mapuche revolt was triggered following the news of the battle of Curalaba on the 23 of December 1598, where the vice toqui Pelantaru and his lieutenants Anganamon and Guaiquimilla with three hundred men ambushed and killed the Spanish governor Martín García Óñez de Loyola and nearly all his companions.

Over the next few years the Mapuche were able to destroy or force the abandonment of seven Spanish cities in Mapuche territory: Santa Cruz de Coya (1599), Santa María la Blanca de Valdivia (1599), San Andrés de Los Infantes (1599), La Imperial (1600), Santa María Magdalena de Villa Rica (1602), San Mateo de Osorno (1602), and San Felipe de Araucan (1604).

After that, the ocean became the way of contact with Chiloé Island and western Patagonia. According to the Chilean historian Isidoro Vázquez de Acuña, the ocean has been seen as a natural barrier and not as a vessel of contact and expansion in Chile's history.

After the battle of Curalaba in 1598, Spanish cities south of the Biobío River were destroyed, and Spanish conquerors were forced to retrieve to the north, establishing the frontiers of the kingdom of Chile. This meant that Spanish possessions in Chiloé were isolated from the rest of the continent. The only way of communication was the ocean.

The sovereignty of the Kingdom of Chile was extended to Magellan's strait, so it was its responsibility to recognize the region, alongside Patagonia, in a context of possible English threat. This task fell to Chiloe's governor as Walter Hanisch a Chilean historian stated. Several expedition departed from the island in the colonial period.

On the other hand, the missionary expedition was in the hands of the Jesuit order in the 17th century. Their objective was to convert the Chono people, without success. The chono chief Pedro Delco converted to catolicism, becoming a key to the Jesuit evangelization's attempts.

=== 17th century: Consolidation of the kingdom ===
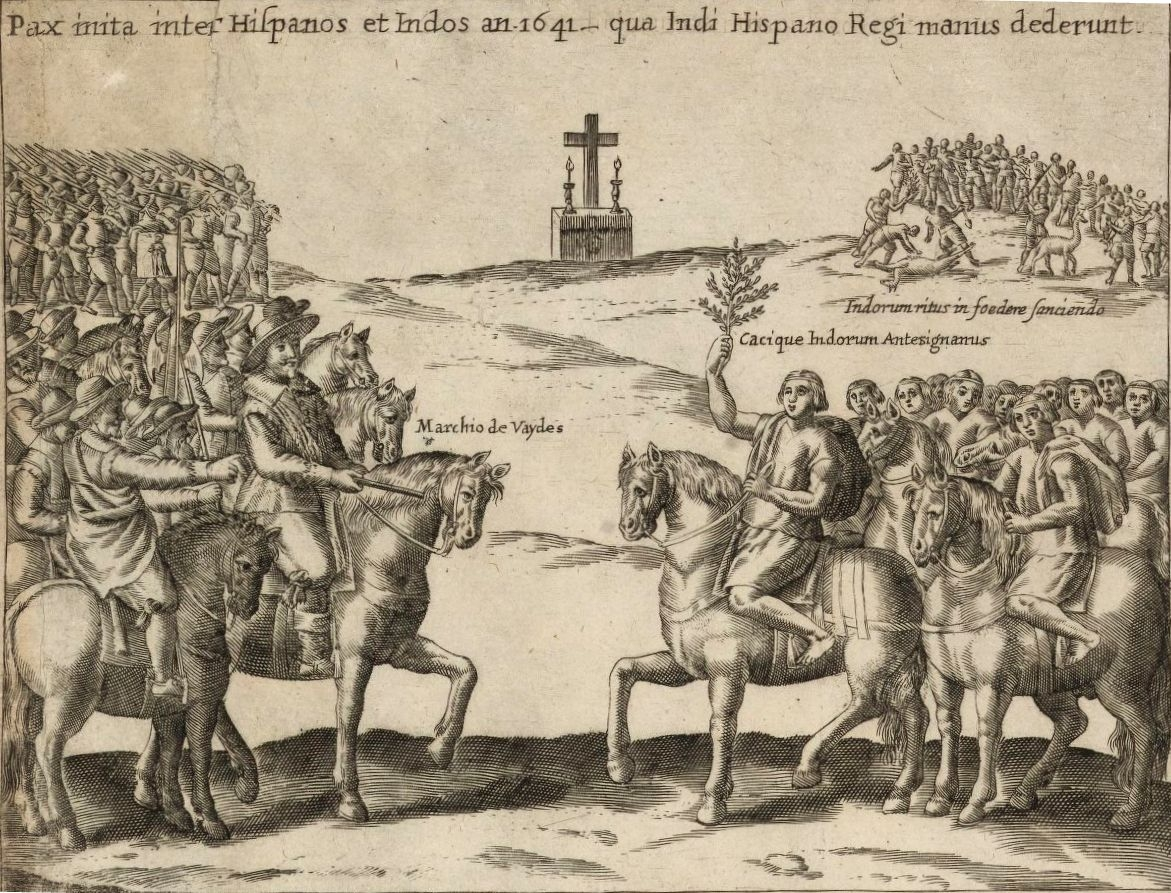
Illustration of the parliament of Quilín in Alonso de Ovalle's book.

In the 17th century, the Spanish overseas territory of Chile saw a rearrangement of its population center. While in the 16th century, most of the cities founded by the Spanish were located from Bio-Bio southward, with only Santiago, La Serena, and some transandine cities located north of it, in the 17th century, Spanish authority and settlements were abandoned down south of Bío-Bío Region. The kingdom went from being a gold exporter with potential for expanding to the Strait of Magellan to being one of the Spanish Empire's most problematic and poor in natural resources.

The Spanish Empire diverted silver from Potosí to finance a standing army in Chile to fight in the Arauco War. Since the raids of Francis Drake in Chilean waters more seaborne assaults followed in the 17th century, mostly from Dutch corsairs. The Spanish Empire's attempts to block the entrance to the Pacific Ocean by fortifying the Straits of Magellan were abandoned after the discovery of Hoces Sea, focusing then on fortifying the coastal cities of Chile, a tactic that later was proven to be more affordable and effective in combating piracy while keeping the area under Spanish rule.

In 1641 the Parliament of Quillín happened in which Mapuche (known as Araucanians or Reche) obtained a peace treaty and a recognition of autonomy on behalf of the crown in exchange for loyalty against foreign powers.

=== 18th century: Reforms and development ===
Following the expulsion of the Jesuits from the Spanish territories in 1767, most of the 181 Chilean Jesuits forced into exile settled in Italy. There, they continued their cultural and religious activities, which increasingly became connected to their sense of attachment to the distant homeland from which they had been expelled.

== Political history ==
As noted, the area had been designated a governorship (gobernación) during the initial exploration and settlement of the area, but because the local Amerindian peoples demonstrated fierce resistance, a more autonomous, military-based governmental authority was needed. Thus, the governor was given command of the local military and the title of captain general. This arrangement was seen in many places of the Spanish Empire.

The greatest setback the Spanish settlements suffered was the Disaster of Curalaba in 1598, which nearly wiped them out. All cities south of the Biobío River with the exception of Castro were destroyed. The river became La Frontera the de facto border between Spanish and Native areas for the next century. (See Arauco War.)

In 1609 the Royal Audiency of Santiago de Chile was founded after the failure of the Concepción Royal Audiency. Its territory was equivalent to the Governorate one.

Chile started being a Captaincy General in 1778 with the Bourbon Reforms. Before it was a Governorate, and also it always was considered a Kingdom, since it was an Indies Kingdom.

Chile gained two intendancies, Santiago and Concepción in 1786 and became a Bourbon-style Captaincy General in 1789.

In 1798 Chile obtained more autonomy from the Peruvian Viceroyalty.

== Society ==
=== Societal groups ===
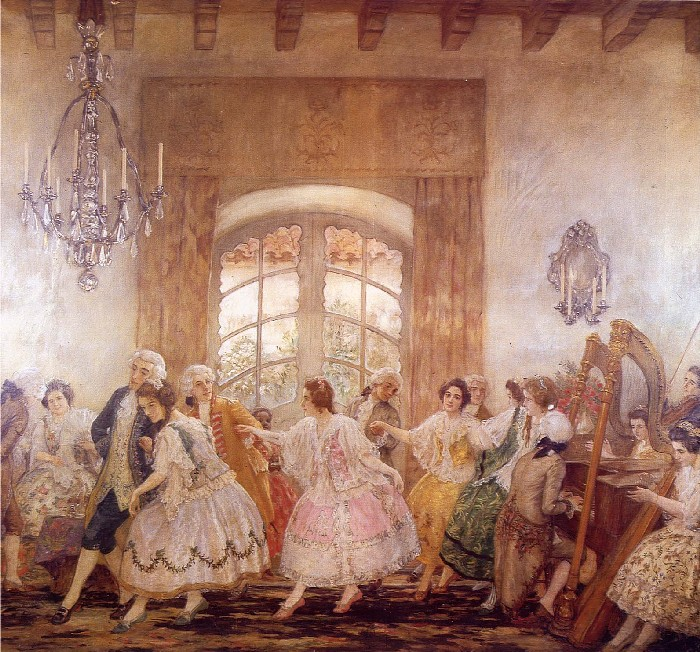
"Baile del Santiago antiguo" by Pedro Subercaseaux. Chile's colonial high society were made up by landowners and government officials.

Chilean colonial society was based on a caste system. Criollos (American-born Spaniards) enjoyed privileges like the ownership of encomiendas (jurisdictions in which Indigenous people were forced to labor). They were allowed limited access to government and administrative positions such as corregidor or alférez. Mestizos made up initially a small group, but with time grew to become a majority in Chilean society becoming more numerous than native indigenous peoples.

Mestizos made up initially a small group, but eventually became a majority in Chilean society. Mestizos were not a homogeneous group and were judged more by appearance and education than by actual ancestry. Native peoples experienced the most discrimination among societal groups in colonial Chile; many of them were used as cheap labor in encomienda, causing their numbers to decrease over time due to disease. Pehuenches, Huilliches and Mapuches living south of La Frontera were not part of the colonial society since they were outside the de facto borders of Chile. Black slaves made up a minority of the population in colonial Chile and had a special status due to their high cost of import and maintenance.

Black slaves were often used as housekeepers and other posts of confidence. Peninsulares, Spaniards born in Spain, were a small group in late colonial times, some of them came as government officials and some other as merchants. Their role in high government positions in Chile led to resentment among local criollos. Mixing of different groups was not uncommon although marriage between members of the different groups was rare.

During late colonial times new migration pulses took off leading to large numbers of Basque people settling in Chile mingling with landowning criollos, forming a new upper class. Scholar Louis Thayer Ojeda estimates that during the 17th and 18th centuries fully 45% of all immigrants in Chile were Basques.

=== Sex and marriage ===
Native indigenous peoples in colonial society appeared, to the average Catholic Spaniard, to be somewhat liberal in their approach to sexual relationships.

16th century Spaniards are known to have been pessimistic about marriage. Many of the initial conquistadores left their own families behind in Spain and started new relationships in Chile. Examples of this is Pedro de Valdivia who held Inés de Suárez as a common law wife while in Chile. Adultery was explicitly forbidden for Catholics and the Council of Trent (1545–1563) made the climate prone for accusations of adultery. Over the course of the 16th, 17th and 18th centuries marital fidelity increased in Chile.

The main indigenous group in the Aconcagua Valley was the Picunche people, which was the main ethnicity to be mixed with the Spaniards, as the territory controlled by the Monarchy was mainly concentrated those lands.

== Borders ==
Map of the districts of the Kingdom of Chile (1776).

In 1548 the theoretical territory granted to the Governorate of Chile by Pedro de la Gasca, President of the Lima's Royal Audience, extended between parallel 27° to 41° South (nearby Copiapó and Osorno) with 100 leagues to the east counted from the Pacific coast. This was confirmed by King Charles I in 1542, who in 1554 extended the southern border of Chile to the Strait of Magellan by petition of Jerónimo de Alderete, who also was named Governor of the Governorate of Terra Australis alongside Chile since 1555. In 1557 the eastern coast of Patagonia to the Magellan Strait was given to Jaime Rasquín, generating overlaping claims with the 100 leagues of Chile, in 1563 Tucumán was segregated from Chile. In 1570 the Rasquín territories were given to Juan Ortiz de Zárate, Governor of Río de la Plata and Paraguay, continuing the overlap.

The authonomous region of Araucanía, recognized as so in 1641 in the Quilín Parliament, was considered part of the Governorate's territory in paper.

In 1680 the Compilation of Indies Laws were published, and in 1681 a Royal Decree specified that all laws that contradicted the Compilation were invalid. In the Book 2, Title 15 the Compilation details the Royal Audiences territories, only in the Chilean one the Strait of Magellan is mentioned. The law says: "which has as its district all the said Kingdom of Chile, with the cities, towns, villages, places and lands included in the government of those provinces, as well as what is now pacified and populated, as well as what will be reduced, populated and pacified within and outside the Strait of Magellan and the land inside up to and including the province of Cuyo". This is interpreted by Manuel Ravest Mora as the reversion of the Eastern Patagonia Coast possession by the Governorate of La Plata, reverting to the 100 leagues of Chile only.

In 1768 Chiloé started being administered directly from Peru temporally, it was returned to full control to Chile in 1788 but only on paper, something that was never put into effect by the Viceroy. Chiloé's theoretical territory reached Cape Horn to the South.

In 1770, the Viceroy of Peru Manuel de Amat y Junyent organized an expedition in search of the so-called "Davis Land", entrusting Felipe González Ahedo with two vessels, the ship of the line San Lorenzo and the frigate Santa Rosalía, with 546 sailors. He reached the island on November 15 of the same year, taking possession of it in the name of the Spanish Crown and naming it Isla San Carlos, in honor of King Charles III.

In 1776, Abbot Juan Ignacio Molina highlighted Easter Island for its "monumental statues" in the fifth chapter on the "Chilean Islands" of his book Natural and Civil History of the Kingdom of Chile, which also mentions the islands of San Félix and San Ambrosio from the Desventuradas Archipelago. Juan Fernández Islands were also claimed as Chilean territory. In 1808 the Salas y Gómez Island was discovered.

Chile lost an important part of its territory with the Bourbon reforms of Charles III, the territories of the city of Mendoza and San Juan from the province of Cuyo were transferred to the domain of the newly created Viceroyalty of the Río de la Plata in 1776.

There were documents and maps, specially from the 18th Century, in which Eastern Patagonia appears in the Chilean de jure territory, and others from the Viceroyalty of Río de La Plata, in the 19th Century the newly formed Republics disputed the territory until 1881.

In the northern border the disputed territory was located between the mouth of the Loa River and Paposo, where a Salado River should be located but the exact location is unknown. Chilean Historians often cite a 1793 Andrés Baleato map to argue in favor of the Loa River border as well as other documents from him.

=== Chilean Antarctica in the Hispanic Monarchy times ===
World Map by Abraham Ortelius (1570), where appears the Terra Australis Incognita

For many years, cartographers and European explorers speculated about the existence of the Terra Australis Incognita, a landmass potentially of vast size located south of the Strait of Magellan and Tierra del Fuego.

On 7 June 1494, the Treaty of Tordesillas was signed between Spain and Portugal. This treaty gave rights to newly discovered territories to the two countries according to a line running from pole to pole; at 46° 37'W in the Spanish classical interpretation and farther west according to the Portuguese interpretation. The areas of Antarctica claimed by Chile today fall within the region granted to Spain by this original treaty. Though backed by the papal bull Ea quae pro bono pacis in 1506, the Treaty of Tordesillas was not recognized by several other European powers, including France and other Catholic states. For England, the Netherlands, Russia and other countries, the Antarctic areas were considered res nullius, a no man's land, subject to the occupation of any nation that had the courage and ambition to send people to claim them.

After the discovery of the Strait of Magellan in 1520, cartographers were convinced of the ancient theory of Claudio Tolomeo about the existence of a continent around the South Pole. Maps and charts were published on the basis that Tierra del Fuego was the discovered part of that continent.

In 1534, the Holy Roman Emperor Charles V divided the South American territory of Spain into three governorates: New Castile or Peru (to Francisco Pizarro), New Toledo or Chile (to Diego de Almagro) and New León (to Simón de Alcazaba y Sotomayor) also known as the Magellanic Lands and subsequently extended to the Strait of Magellan.

Map of the Spanish Governorate of Terra Australis (1539–1555), the first territorial claim over the lands near the South Pole; later it was incorporated into the Governorate of Chile.

In 1539, a new governorate was formed south of New León called the Terra Australis under Pedro Sánchez de la Hoz. This consisted of the land south of the Strait of Magellan, i.e. Tierra del Fuego, and onward unexplored land to the South Pole. At the time, the existence of the Drake Passage was not known and Tierra del Fuego thought to be part of the Antarctic mainland.

In 1554, the conquistador Pedro de Valdivia, who led the Governorate of Chile, talked to the Council of the Indies about giving the rights of New León and Terra Australis to Jeronimo de Alderete. After the death of Valdivia in the following year, Alderete became the governor of Chile and thereby claimed New León and Terra Australis for Chile. A Royal Decree of 1554 states:

Because it was personally consulted, we will grant to the Captain Jeronimo de Alderete the land across the Magellan Strait.

Later, in 1558, the Royal Decree of Brussels prompted the Chilean colonial government to "take ownership in our name from the lands and provinces that fall in the demarcation of the Spanish crown", referring to the land "across the Strait", i.e. Terra Australis.

One of the most important works of Spanish literature, the epic poem La Araucana by Alonso de Ercilla, is considered by Chileans to give encouragement to their territorial claims in Antarctica. In the seventh stanza of his Canto I:

Northern Chile is of great length; it is called the coast of the new Sea of the South. From east to west it is narrow, 100 miles at its broadest, and at 27 degrees from the South Pole, the Atlantic and Pacific Oceans mix their waters in a narrow channel. And those two seas which clamour to join, passing along it, beat the rocks and spread out their waves, preventing numerous islands from joining together. At this point the land is split; here the waters can communicate. Magellan, Sir, was the first to open this path, which was then given his name.

A circle located '27 degrees from the South Pole' corresponds to a latitude of 63 degrees south, on the southern side of the Drake Passage and just north of the Antarctic Peninsula. However, ambiguity suggests that a misplaced Strait of Magellan may be referred to.

There are other stories and maps, both Chilean and European, indicating that Terra Australis and Antarctica were claimed by the Captaincy General of Chile for the Spanish Empire.

In March 1603, the Spanish navigator Gabriel de Castilla sailed from Valparaíso entrusted with three ships belonging to the viceroy of Peru, Luis de Velasco y Castilla. The goal of this expedition was to repress the incursions of Dutch privateers in the Southern Seas as far as 64 degrees south latitude. No documents confirming the latitude reached or land sighted have been found in the Spanish archives. However, a story told by the Dutch sailor Laurenz Claesz (date unknown, but probably after 1607), gives interesting details. Claesz said:

[They] sailed under the Admiral don Gabriel of Castile with three ships along the coasts of Chile towards Valparaíso, and from there to the strait. In March of 1603, he reached 64 degrees and they had a lot of snow there. In the following April, they returned back to the coast of Chile.

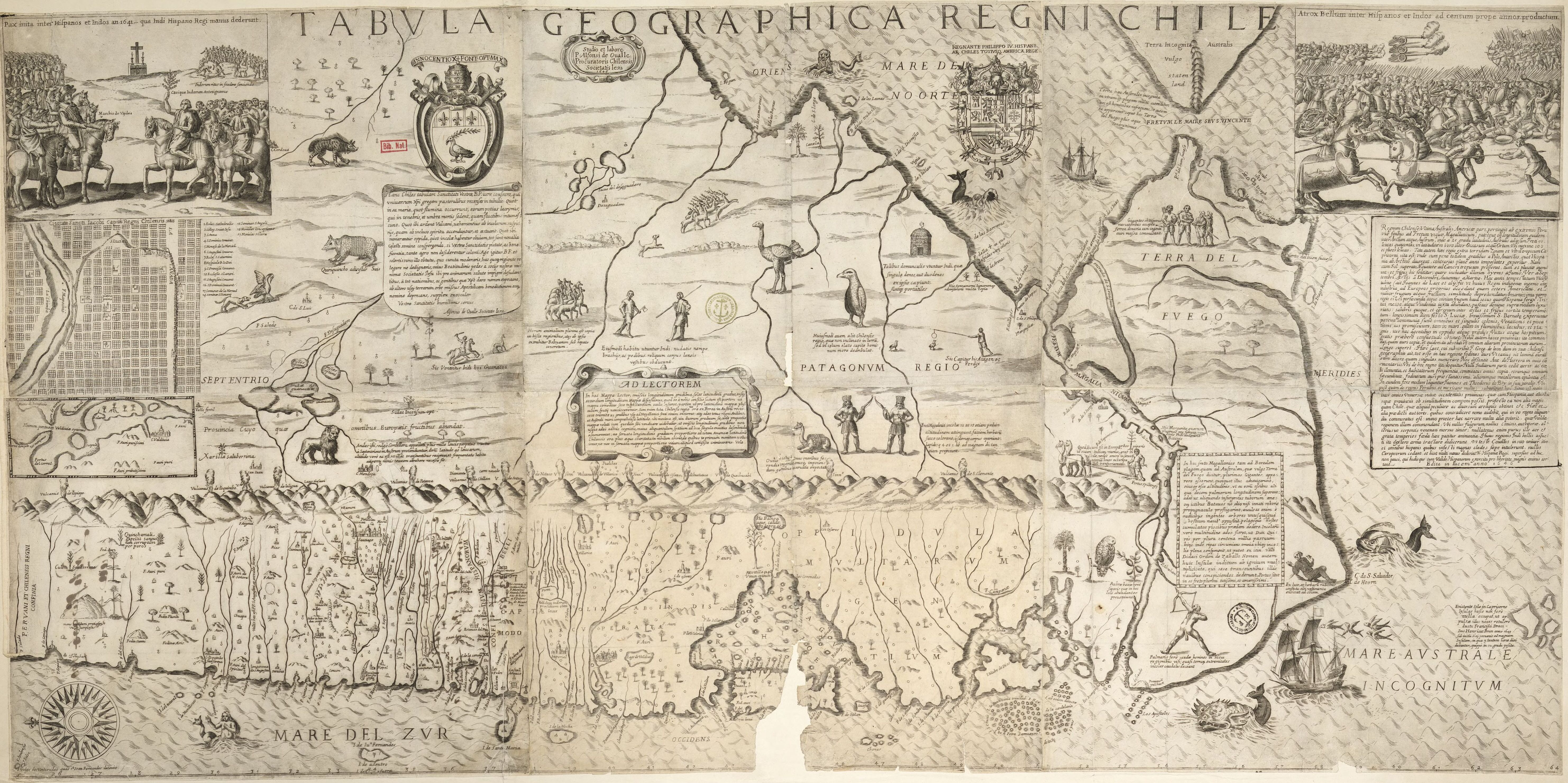
Tabula geographica Regni Chile from 1646 depicts Terra Australis Incognita to the east of Tierra del Fuego.

In 1622, a Dutch document was published in Amsterdam stating that at 64 degrees south there was land which was "very high and mountainous, snow cover, like the country of Norway, all white, land. It seemed to extend to the Solomon Islands". This could be the first recorded sighting by a European of the Antarctic Peninsula. Other historians attribute the first sighting of Antarctic land to the Dutch mariner Dirk Gerritsz. According to his account, his ship was diverted from its course by a storm after passing through the Strait of Magellan as part of a Dutch expedition to the East Indies in 1599. Gerritsz may have sighted the South Shetland Islands, though there are doubts about his trustworthiness. Other authorities place the first sighting of mainland Antarctica as late as 27 January 1820 by an expedition of the Imperial Russian Navy led by Fabian Gottlieb von Bellingshausen.

Open ocean south of South America was reported by the Spanish navigator Francisco de Hoces in 1525 and by Sir Francis Drake in 1578. The existence of Drake Passage was confirmed when the Dutch navigator Willem Schouten became the first to sail around Cape Horn en route to the East Indies in 1616. In 1772, the British explorer Captain James Cook circumnavigated the Southern Ocean.

== Economy ==
The Spanish conquest of Chile was carried out by private enterprises rather than directly by the Spanish Crown. The settlers established cities, granting land and indigenous labor to Spaniards for economic activities.

Gold extraction and agriculture were key economic activities, though the exploitation of indigenous labor led to conflicts with Jesuits, Spanish officials, and Mapuche resistance. The Spanish city network collapsed after the battle of Curalaba (1598), leading to an economic shift towards hacienda-based agriculture and livestock farming.

In the 17th century, Chilean exports to Viceroyalty of Peru included suet, charqui, and leather, making the period known as the "century of suet." Additionally, wood from Chiloé Archipelago and Valdivia supplied Peruvian markets.

By the 18th century, Chile had become a key wheat supplier to Peru, especially after the 1687 earthquake and stem rust epidemic in Peru devastated local production. Chilean latifundia focused on international exports rather than local markets. The century also saw a mining revival, with gold and silver production increasing significantly.

Shipbuilding peaked in Valdivia, Concepción, and Chiloé, constructing vessels including frigates for Spanish trade. Meanwhile, smuggling became widespread, weakening Spain's trade monopoly.

The Chilean Independence War (1810–1818) disrupted trade and devastated the countryside. The post-war economy struggled with heavy debt, and an 1822 loan from London burdened the new Chilean state for decades. Despite these challenges, new trade relations with the United States, France, and the United Kingdom emerged.

== See also ==
- Real Audiencia of Concepción
- Royal Governor of Chile
- Arauco War
- Spanish immigration to Chile
