= Capitulation of Toledo of 1529 =

Spanish royal decree

Capitulation of Toledo
- Spanish governorates in South America in 1529.
- Date: 26 July 1529
- Location: Toledo, Crown of Castile
- Participants: Isabella of Portugal (on behalf of Charles V); Francisco Pizarro; García Fernández Manrique, Count of Osorno; Doctor Diego Beltrán
- Outcome: Authorization for Pizarro to conquer and govern New Castile (Peru)

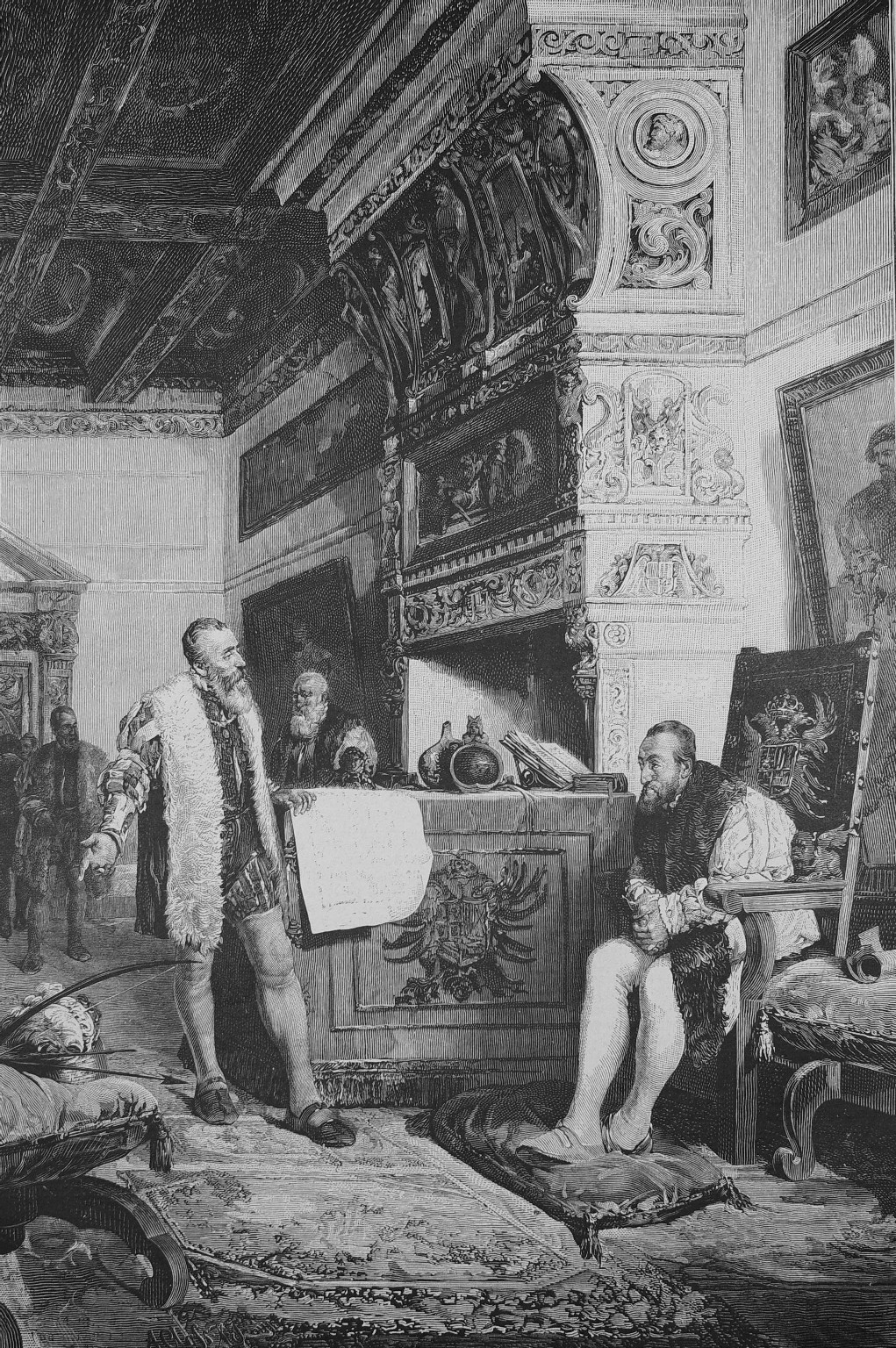
Engraving depicting Francisco Pizarro presenting evidence of the Inca Empire to King Charles V.

The Capitulation of Toledo was a royal decree issued on 26 July 1529 in Toledo by the Crown of Castile, granting Francisco Pizarro the right to conquer and settle the province of Peru, or New Castile. Signed by Queen Isabella of Portugal (acting for the absent Charles V), the Count of Osorno García Fernández Manrique (president of the Council of the Indies), and Doctor Diego Beltrán, it formalized the conquest of Peru.

The agreement authorized Pizarro to explore and settle a 200-league coastal strip along the South Sea from the Santiago River (near modern Esmeraldas, Ecuador) to Chincha (Peru). This region, already partially explored by Pizarro and Diego de Almagro, encompassed much of the Inca Empire.

South of Chincha, another 200 leagues were granted to Simón de Alcazaba y Sotomayor as a Governorate, though he failed to organize an expedition within five years.

...you, Captain Francisco Pizarro... with the desire to serve us and increase our royal crown, some five years ago... took charge of conquering, discovering, pacifying, and populating along the coast of the South Sea... I the Queen.

— (Excerpt)

== Background ==
After two exploratory voyages along the Pacific coast, Pizarro returned to Panama and convinced partners Almagro and Hernando de Luque to seek royal approval. Denied support by governor Pedro de los Ríos, Pizarro sailed to Spain in 1528, bringing indigenous people, gold, silver, and textiles as proof of a wealthy empire.

Arriving in Seville in 1529, he was briefly imprisoned over old debts but released by royal order. In Toledo, he negotiated with the Council of the Indies. Though Charles V was absent, Queen Isabella signed the capitulation.

== Key provisions ==
- Pizarro was named lifelong governor, captain general, adelantado, and alguacil mayor of New Castile, with an annual salary of 725,000 maravedís.
- Almagro received the governorship of a fortress in Tumbes and a modest salary.
- Luque was appointed Bishop of Tumbes and "protector of the Indians."
- The Thirteen of Isla del Gallo were ennobled.
- Settlers were granted tax exemptions on gold, trade, and tribute for 5–10 years.
- Pizarro had to depart within six months and reach Peru within another six.

== Aftermath ==
The capitulation favored Pizarro over his partners, sowing discord with Almagro. It was supplemented in 1534, extending jurisdiction southward by 270 leagues. In 1539, Pedro Sánchez de la Hoz was granted the Terra Australis near the Strait of Magellan.

== Bibliography ==
- del Busto Duthurburu, José Antonio. Pizarro. Vol. I. Petroperú - Ediciones COPÉ, Lima, 2001. ISBN 9972-606-21-X
- del Busto Duthurburu, José Antonio. La conquista del Perú. Lima: Empresa Editora El Comercio S.A., 2011. ISBN 978-612-306-077-0
