= Terra Australis =

Hypothetical continent

- 1570 map by Abraham Ortelius depicting Terra Australis Nondum Cognita (transl. The southern land yet not known) as a large continent on the bottom of the map

In-universe information
- Type: Hypothetical continent
- Locations: Patalis

Terra Australis (Latin for 'Southern Land') was a hypothetical continent first posited in antiquity and which appeared on maps between the 15th and 18th centuries. Its existence was not based on any survey or direct observation, but rather on the idea that continental land in the Northern Hemisphere should be balanced by land in the Southern Hemisphere.

== Names ==
Other names for the hypothetical continent have included Terra Australis Ignota and Terra Australis Incognita (transl. the unknown most southern land), and Terra Australis Nondum Cognita (transl. the most southern land not yet known). Other names were Brasiliae Australis (transl. the most southern Brazil), and Magellanica (transl. the land of Magellan). Matthias Ringmann called it the Ora antarctica (transl. antarctic land) in 1505, and Franciscus Monachus called it the Australis orę (Austral country). In medieval times it was known as the Antipodes.

The French writer Guillaume Postel proposed the name Chasdia, after Noah's grandson Cush, for the hypothetical continent on the basis of it having dark-skinned inhabitants (Cush's traditional descendants).

== Change of name ==
During the 18th century, today's Australia was not conflated with Terra Australis, as it sometimes was in the 20th century. Captain Cook and his contemporaries knew that the sixth continent (today's Australia), which they called New Holland, was entirely separate from the imagined (but still undiscovered) seventh continent (today's Antarctica).

In the 19th century, the colonial authorities in Sydney re-allocated the name Australia to New Holland and its centuries-old Dutch name eventually fell into disuse. Meanwhile, having lost its name of Australia, the south polar continent was nameless for decades until Antarctica was coined in the 1890s.

In the early 19th century, British explorer Matthew Flinders popularised the naming of Australia after Terra Australis, giving his rationale that there was "no probability" of finding any significant land mass anywhere more south than Australia. The continent that would come to be named Antarctica would be explored decades after Flinders' 1814 book on Australia, which he had titled A Voyage to Terra Australis, and after his naming switch had gained popularity.

== History ==
=== Origins ===
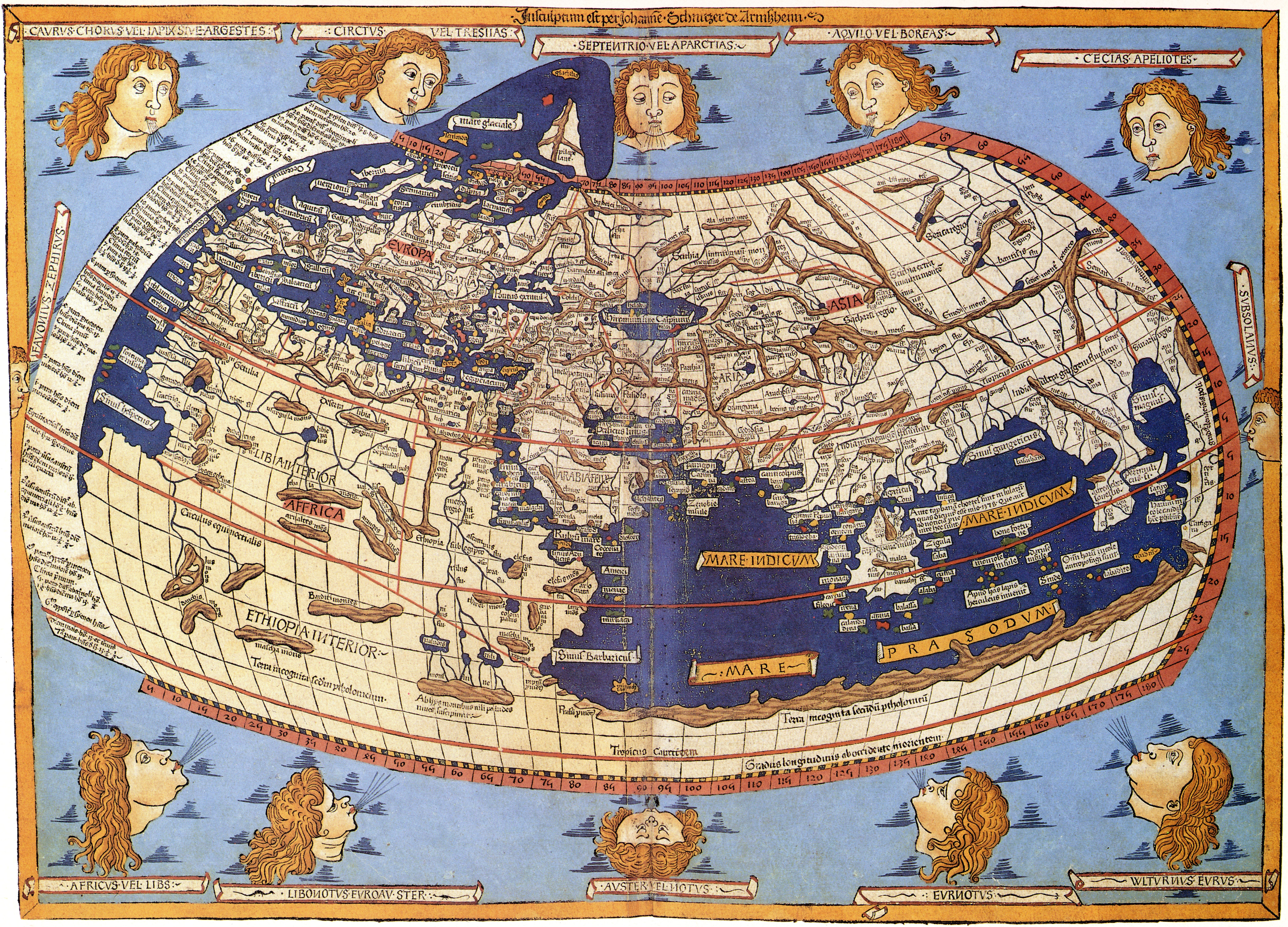
A printed map from the 15th century depicting Ptolemy's description of the Ecumene, by Johannes Schnitzer (1482)

In the fourth century B.C. Aristotle hypothesised that the continents of the Northern Hemisphere must be balanced out by an unknown landmass in the Southern Hemisphere.

Ptolemy (2nd century AD) believed that the Indian Ocean was enclosed on the south by land, and that the lands of the Northern Hemisphere should be balanced by land in the south. Marcus Tullius Cicero used the term cingulus australis ("southern zone") in referring to the Antipodes in Somnium Scipionis ("Dream of Scipio"). The land (terra in Latin) in this zone was the Terra Australis.

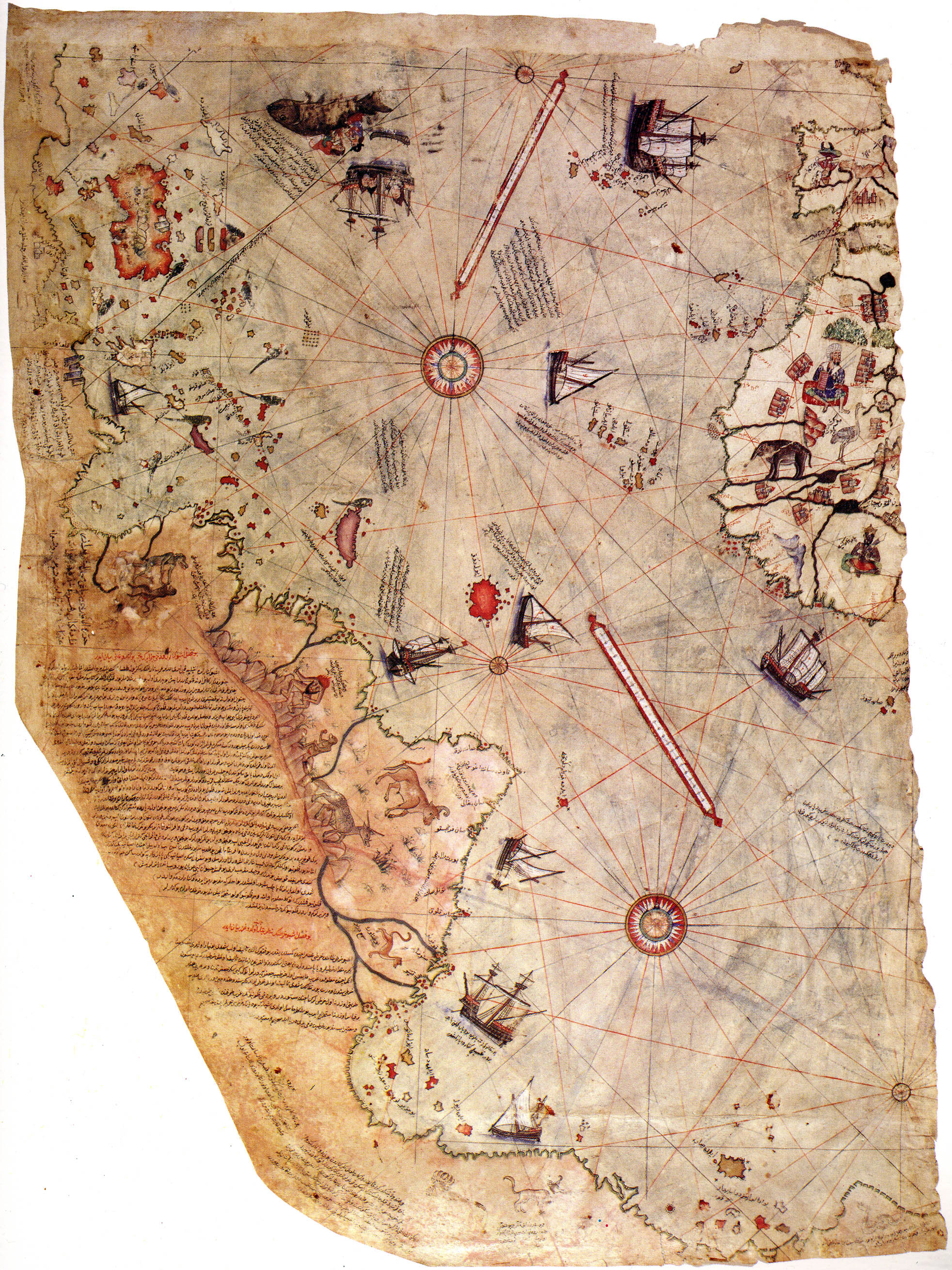
Fragment of the Piri Reis map by Piri Reis in 1513, possibly showing Terra Australis

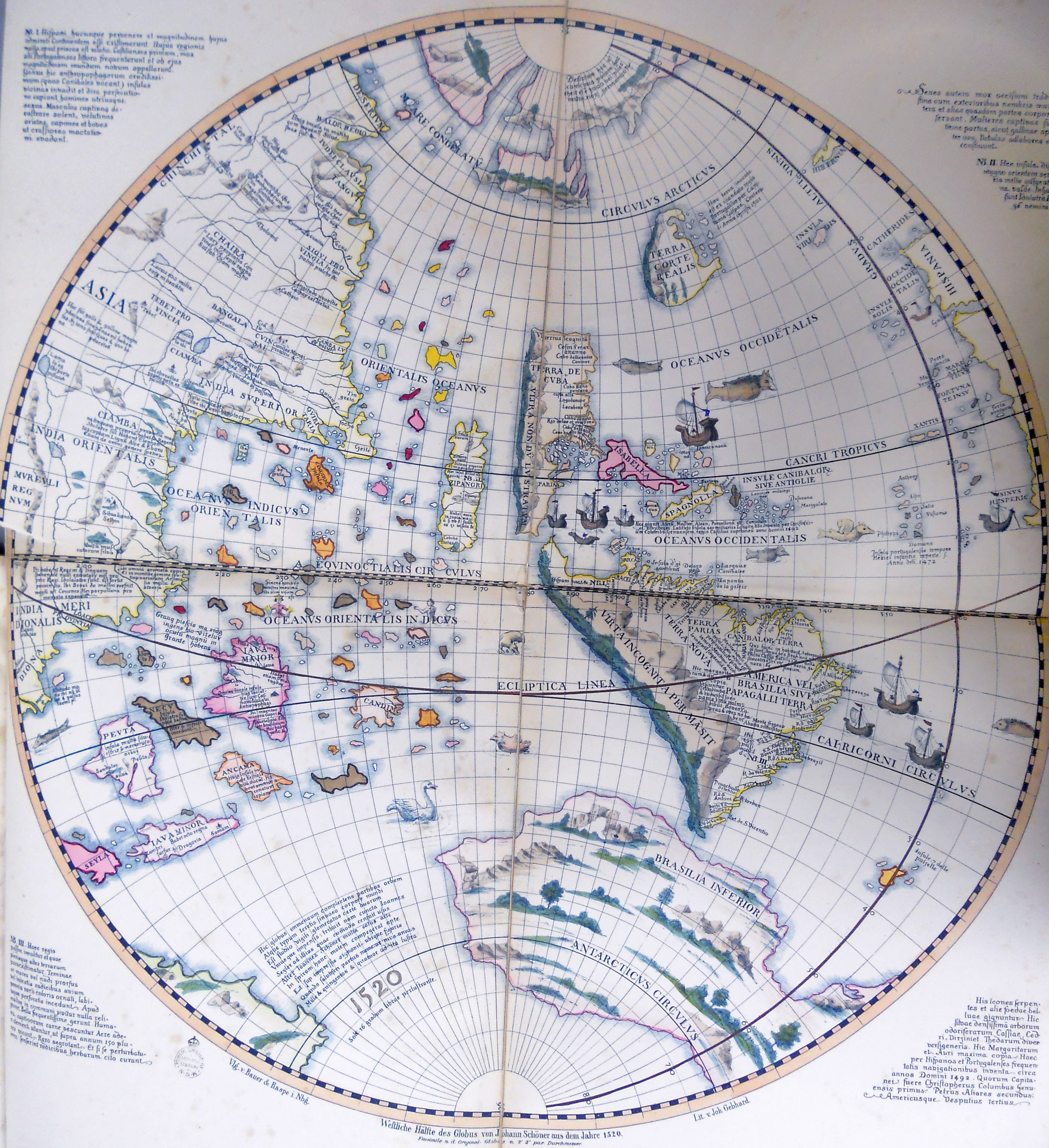
Western Hemisphere of the Johannes Schöner globe from 1520

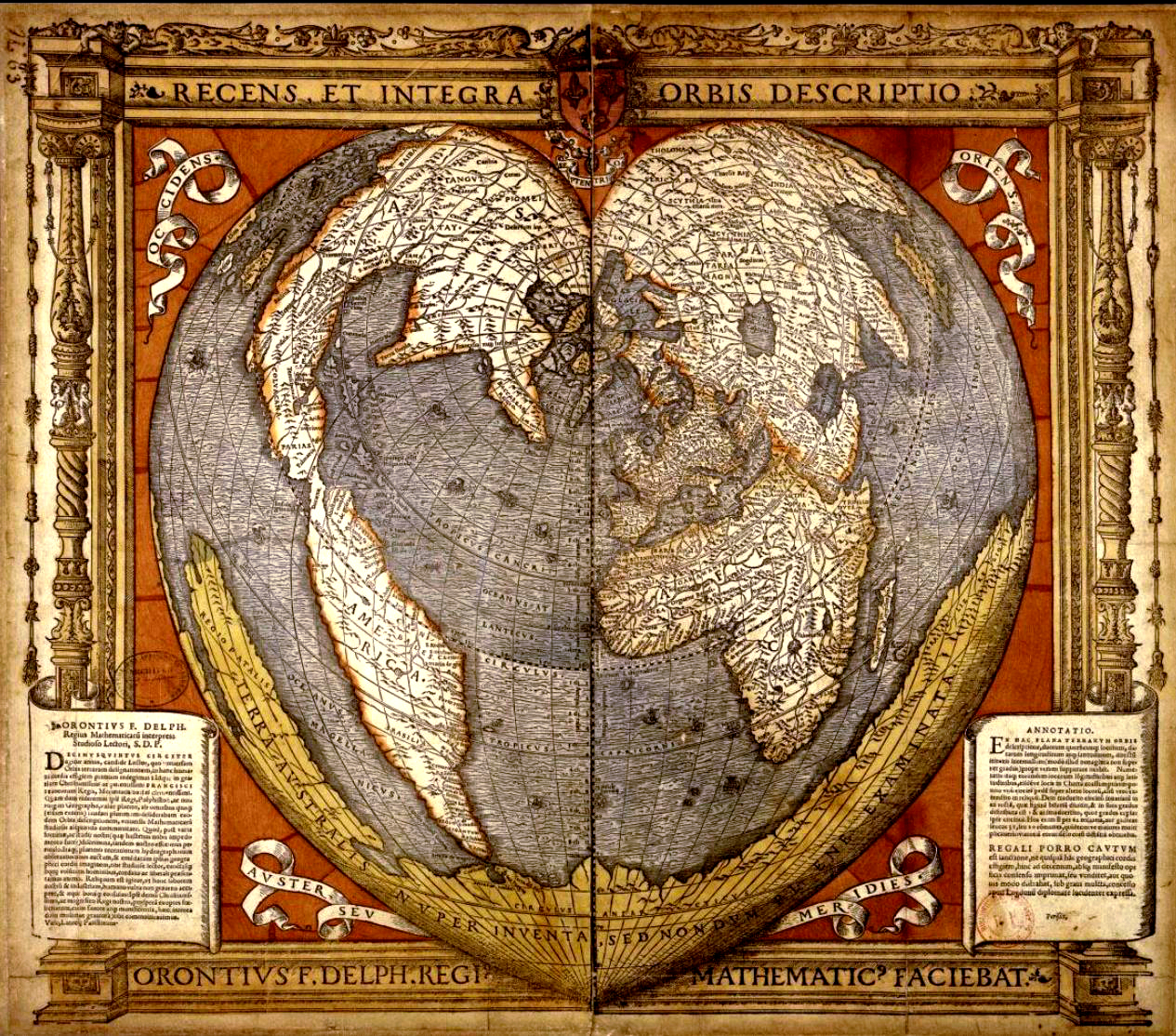
Oronce Fine 1531 double cordiform (heart-shaped) map of the world

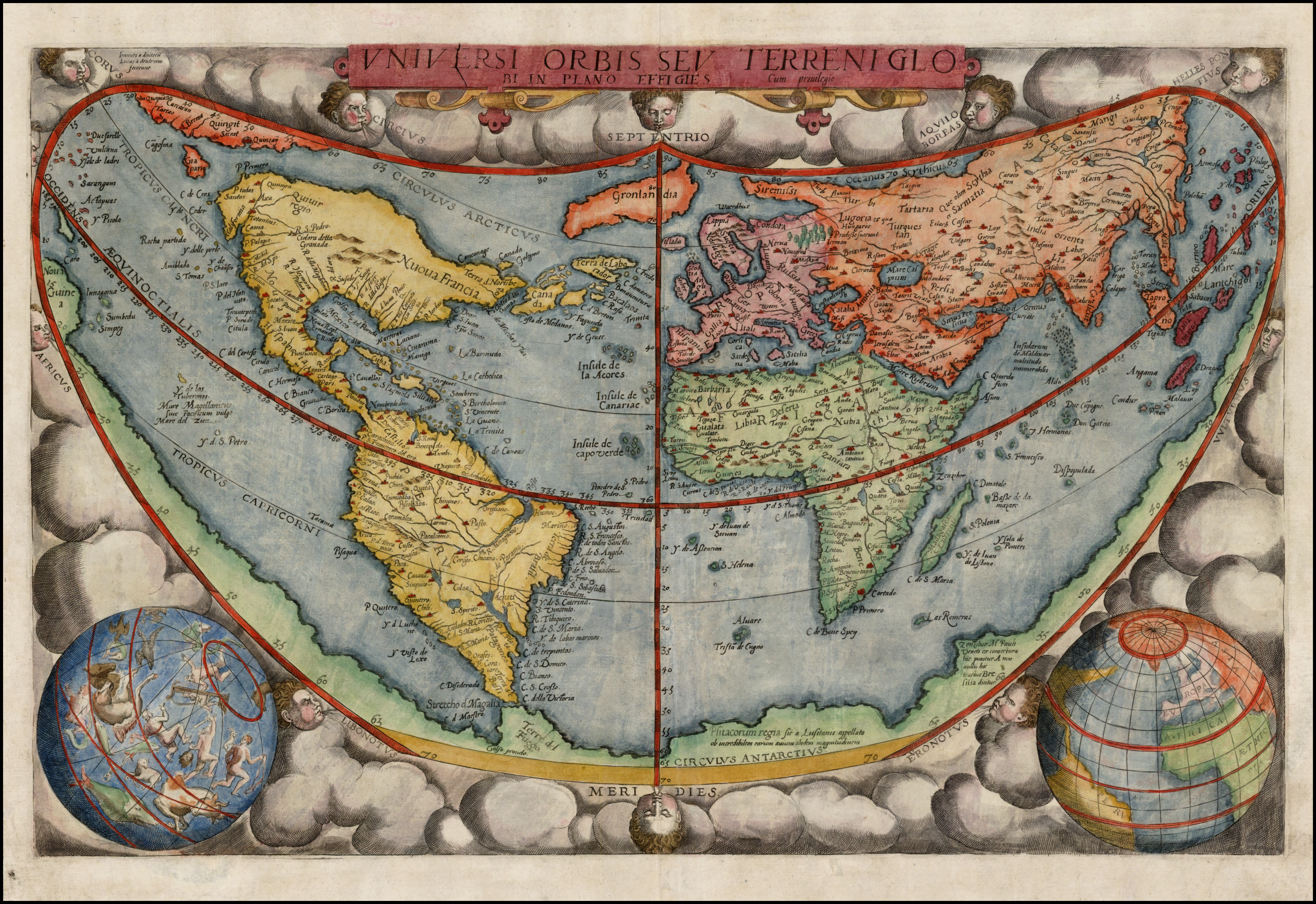
Gerard de Jode, Universi Orbis seu Terreni Globi, 1578. This is a copy on one sheet of Abraham Ortelius' eight-sheet Typus Orbis Terrarum, 1564. The Terra Australis is shown extending northward as far as New Guinea.

Legends of Terra Australis Incognita—an "unknown land of the South"—date back to Roman times and before, and were commonplace in medieval geography, although not based on any documented knowledge of the continent. Ptolemy's maps, which became well known in Europe during the Renaissance, did not actually depict such a continent, but they did show an Africa which had no southern oceanic boundary (and which therefore might extend all the way to the South Pole), and also raised the possibility that the Indian Ocean was entirely enclosed by land. Christian thinkers did not discount the idea that there might be land beyond the southern seas, but the issue of whether it could be inhabited was controversial.

The first depiction of Terra Australis on a globe was probably on Johannes Schöner's lost 1523 globe on which Oronce Fine is thought to have based his 1531 double cordiform (heart-shaped) map of the world. On this landmass he wrote "recently discovered but not yet completely explored". The body of water beyond the tip of South America is called the "Mare Magellanicum", one of the first uses of navigator Ferdinand Magellan's name in such a context.

Schöner called the continent Brasiliae Australis in his 1533 tract, Opusculum geographicum. In it, he explained:

Brasilia Australis is an immense region toward Antarcticum, newly discovered but not yet fully surveyed, which extends as far as Melacha and somewhat beyond. The inhabitants of this region lead good, honest lives and are not Anthropophagi [cannibals] like other barbarian nations; they have no letters, nor do they have kings, but they venerate their elders and offer them obedience; they give the name Thomas to their children [after St Thomas the Apostle]; close to this region lies the great island of Zanzibar at 102.00 degrees and 27.30 degrees South.

=== Mapping the southern continent ===
==== Medieval period ====
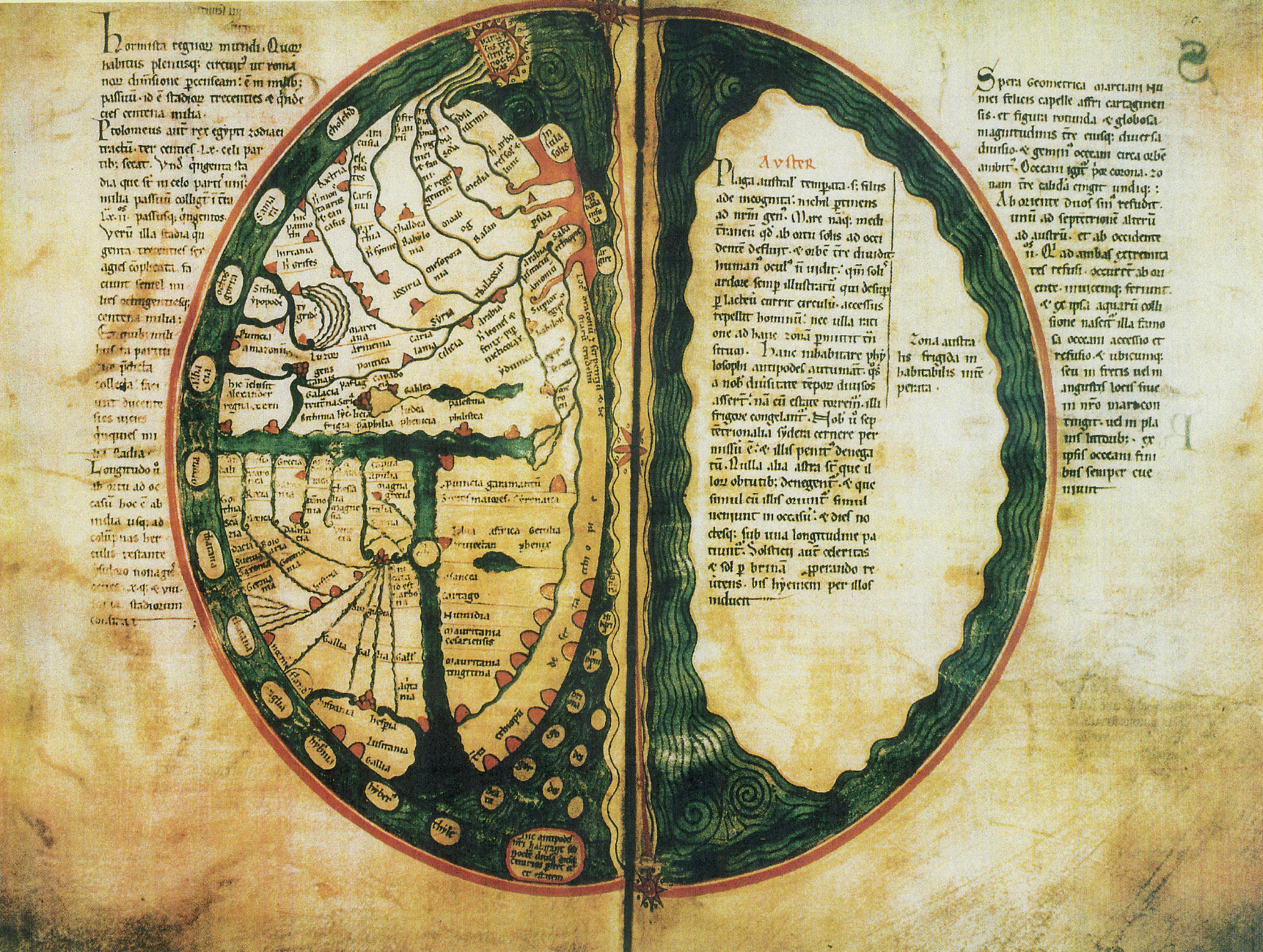
A map in the Liber Floridus (1090–1120) oriented with east on top and north to the left, depicting the known world (Asia, Europe, and Africa) to the left, and Terra Australis to the right

During medieval times Terra Australis was known by a different name, that being the Antipodes. First widely introduced to medieval western Europe by Isidore of Seville in his famous book the Etymologiae, the idea gained popularity across Europe, and most scholars did not question its existence, instead debating if it was habitable for other humans. It would later be included on some zonal Mappa mundi and intrigue medieval scholars for centuries. Al-Yaqubi reports the belief that the furthest south was uninhabitable, while, according to Ibn Khaldun, Averroes challenged the notion that the south was inherently burnt and lifeless, arguing from natural philosophy that the southern hemisphere mirrors the northern hemisphere in its temperance and meteorological balance, making it fundamentally suited for life.

==== 16th century ====
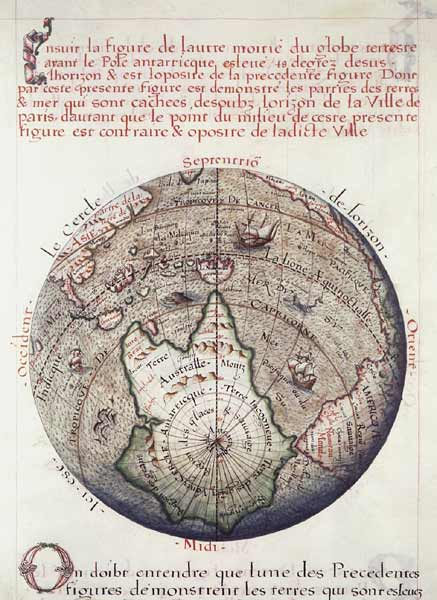
Terre Australle by Jacques de Vaux, 1583

Discussion of various names used for Australia over time

Explorers of the Age of Discovery, from the late 15th century on, proved that Africa was almost entirely surrounded by sea, and that the Indian Ocean was accessible from both west and east. These discoveries reduced the area where the continent could be found; however, many cartographers held to Aristotle's opinion. Scientists such as Gerardus Mercator (1569) and Alexander Dalrymple as late as 1767 argued for its existence, with such arguments as that there should be a large landmass in the south as a counterweight to the known landmasses in the Northern Hemisphere. As new lands were discovered, they were often assumed to be parts of the hypothetical continent.

The German cosmographer and mathematician Johannes Schöner (1477–1547) constructed a terrestrial globe in 1515, based on the world map and globe made by Martin Waldseemüller and his colleagues at St. Dié in Lorraine in 1507. Where Schöner departs most conspicuously from Waldseemüller is in his globe's depiction of an Antarctic continent, called by him Brasilie Regio. His continent is based, however tenuously, on the report of an actual voyage: that of the Portuguese merchants Nuno Manuel and Cristóvão de Haro to the River Plate, and related in the Newe Zeytung auss Presillg Landt ('New Tidings from the Land of Brazil') published in Augsburg in 1514. The Zeytung ('newsbook') described the Portuguese voyagers passing through a strait between the southernmost point of America, or Brazil, and a land to the south west, referred to as vndtere Presill (or Brasilia inferior).

This supposed "strait" was in fact the Rio de la Plata (or the San Matias Gulf). By "vndtere Presill", the Zeytung meant that part of Brazil in the lower latitudes, but Schöner mistook it to mean the land on the southern side of the "strait", in higher latitudes, and so gave to it the opposite meaning. On this slender foundation he constructed his circum-Antarctic continent to which, for the reasons that he does not explain, he gave an annular, or ring shape. In an accompanying explanatory treatise, Luculentissima quaedam terrae totius descriptio ("A Most Lucid Description of All Lands"), he explained:

The Portuguese, thus, sailed around this region, the Brasilie Regio, and discovered the passage very similar to that of our Europe (where we reside) and situated laterally between east and west. From one side the land on the other is visible; and the cape of this region about 60 miles [97 km] away, much as if one were sailing eastward through the Straits of Gibraltar or Seville and Barbary or Morocco in Africa, as our Globe shows toward the Antarctic Pole. Further, the distance is only moderate from this Region of Brazil to Malacca, where St. Thomas was crowned with martyrdom.

On this scrap of information, united with the concept of the Antipodes inherited from Graeco-Roman antiquity, Schöner constructed his representation of the southern continent. His strait served as inspiration for Ferdinand Magellan's expedition to reach the Moluccas by a westward route.

He took Magellan's discovery of Tierra del Fuego in 1520 as further confirmation of its existence, and on his globes of 1523 and 1533 he described it as terra australis recenter inventa sed nondum plene cognita ("Terra Australis, recently discovered but not yet fully known"). It was taken up by his followers, the French cosmographer Oronce Fine in his world map of 1531, and the Flemish cartographers Gerardus Mercator in 1538 and Abraham Ortelius in 1570. Schöner's concepts influenced the Dieppe school of mapmakers, notably in their representation of Jave la Grande.

In 1539, the King of Spain, Charles V, created the Governorate of Terra Australis granted to Pedro Sancho de la Hoz, who in 1540 transferred the title to the conqueror Pedro de Valdivia and later was incorporated to Chile.

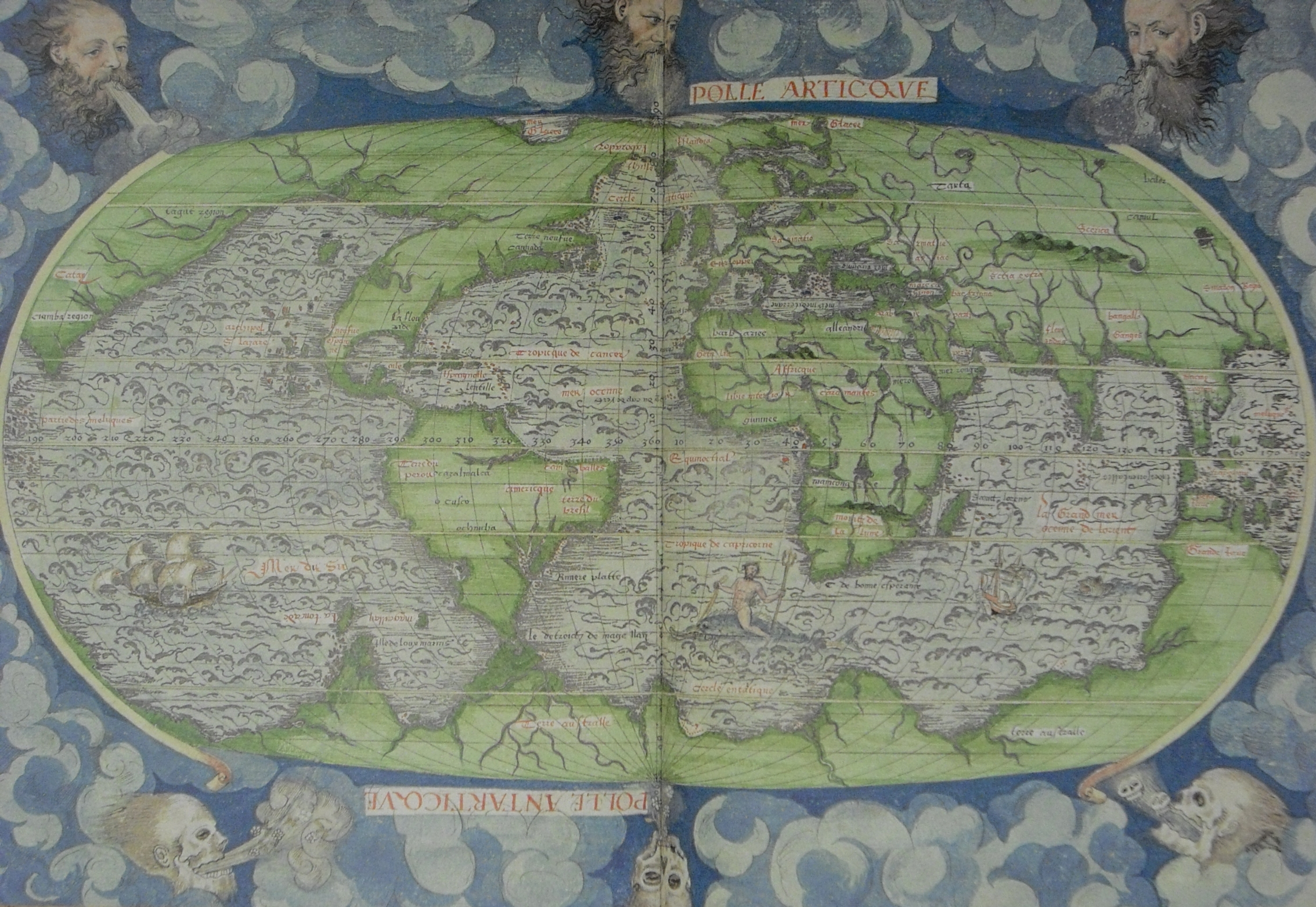
Guillaume Le Testu's 1556 Cosmographie Universel, 4me projection, where the northward extending promontory of the Terre australle is called Grande Jaue

Terra Australis was depicted on the mid-16th-century Dieppe maps, where its coastline appeared just south of the islands of the East Indies; it was often elaborately charted, with a wealth of fictitious detail. There was much interest in Terra Australis among Norman and Breton merchants at that time. In 1566 and 1570, Francisque and André d'Albaigne presented Gaspard de Coligny, Admiral of France, with projects for establishing relations with the Austral lands. Although the Admiral gave favourable consideration to these initiatives, they came to nought when Coligny was killed in 1572.

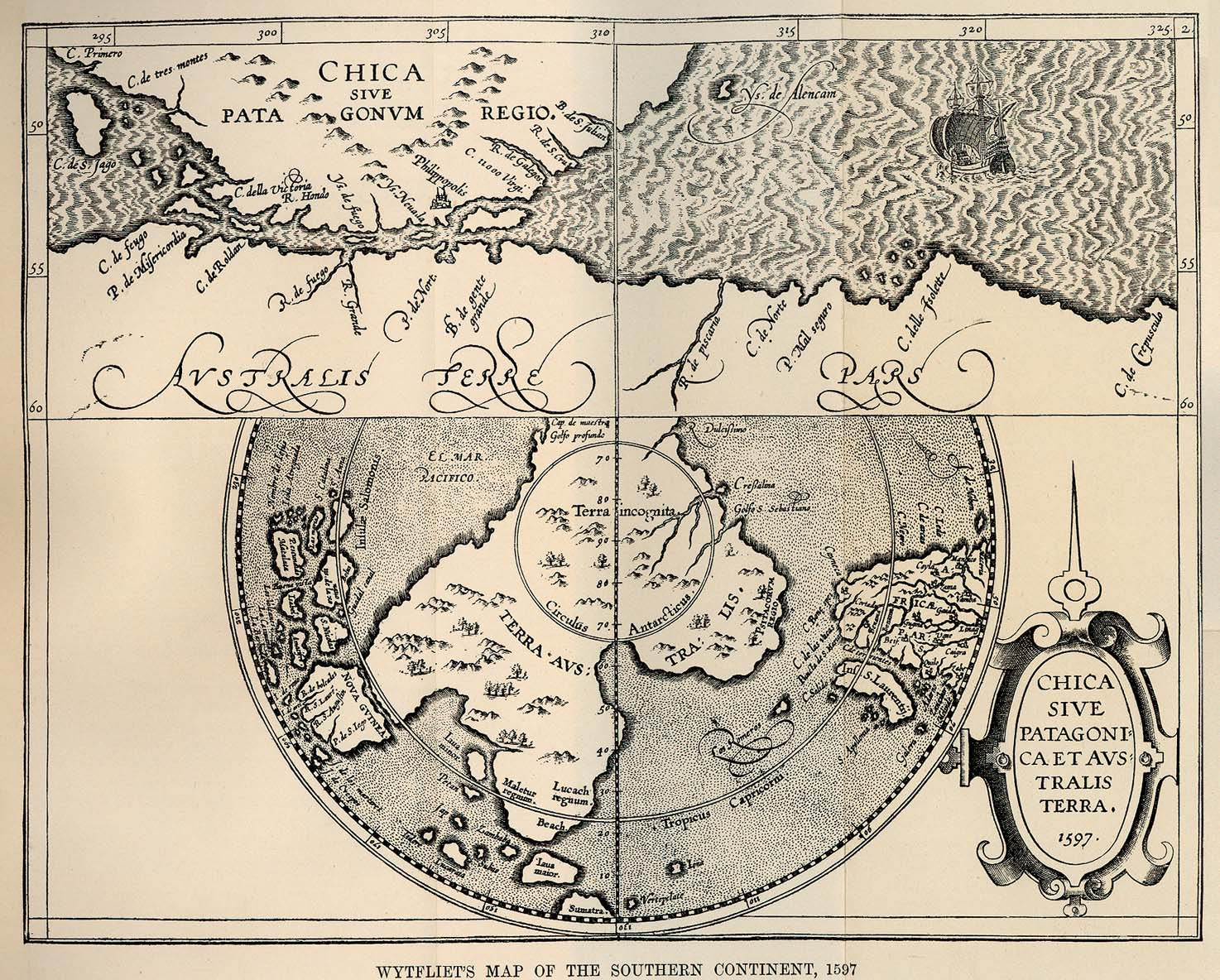
Hypothetical Terra Australis in a map by Cornelius Wytfliet from 1597

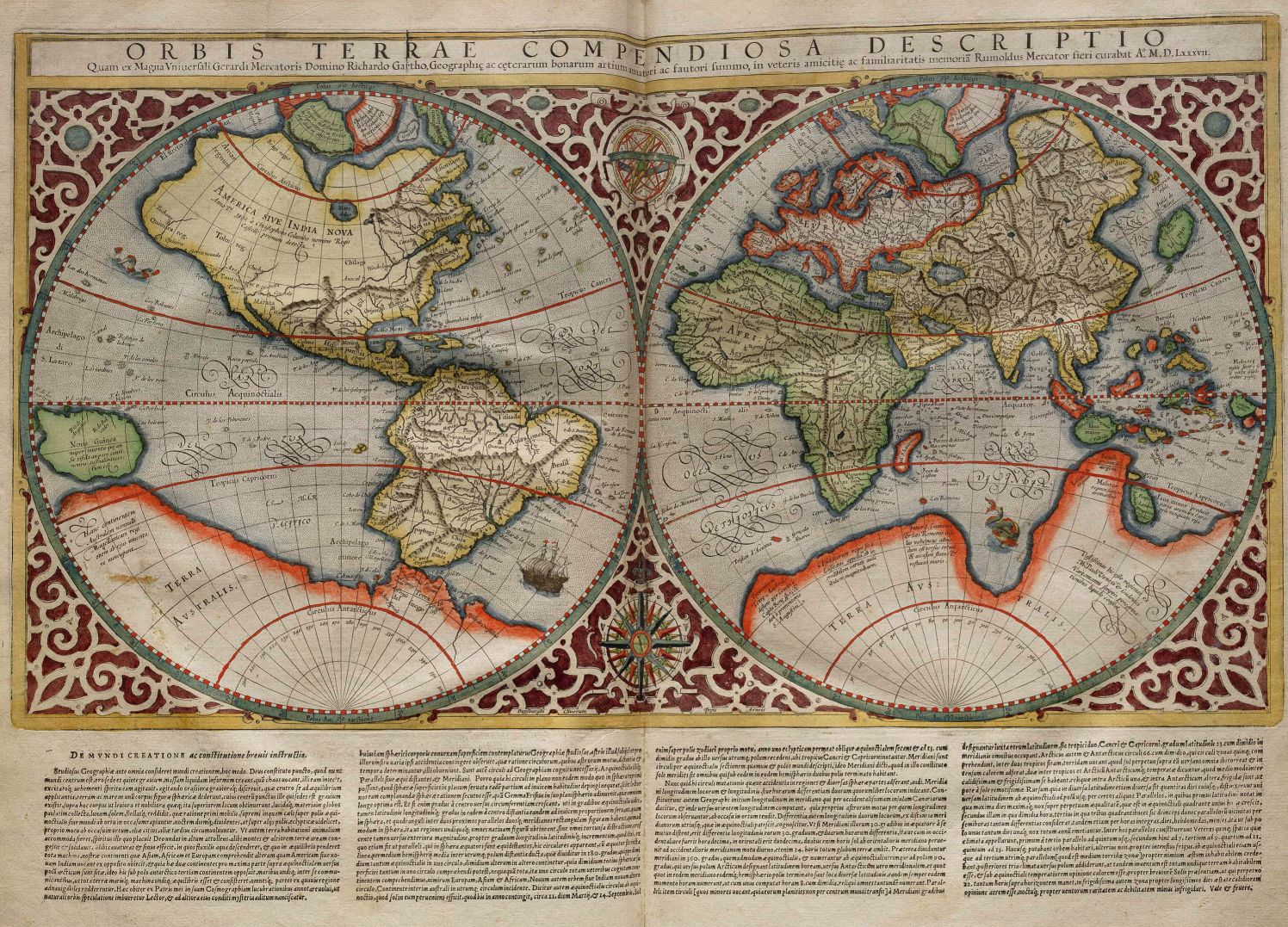
Terra Australis occupies a large part of the southern hemisphere in this world map of 1587 by Rumold Mercator, the son of Gerardus Mercator.

Gerardus Mercator believed in the existence of a large Southern continent on the basis of cosmographic reasoning, set out in the abstract of his Atlas or Cosmographic Studies in Five Books, as related by his biographer, Walter Ghim, who said that even though Mercator was not ignorant that the Austral continent still lay hidden and unknown, he believed it could be "demonstrated and proved by solid reasons and arguments to yield in its geometric proportions, size and weight, and importance to neither of the other two, nor possibly to be lesser or smaller, otherwise the constitution of the world could not hold together at its centre".

The Flemish geographer and cartographer, Cornelius Wytfliet, wrote concerning the Terra Australis in his 1597 book, Descriptionis Ptolemaicae Augmentum:

The terra Australis is therefore the southernmost of all other lands, directly beneath the antarctic circle; extending beyond the tropic of Capricorn to the West, it ends almost at the equator itself, and separated by a narrow strait lies on the East opposite to New Guinea, only known so far by a few shores because after one voyage and another that route has been given up and unless sailors are forced and driven by stress of winds it is seldom visited. The terra Australis begins at two or three degrees below the equator and it is said by some to be of such magnitude that if at any time it is fully discovered they think it will be the fifth part of the world. Adjoining Guinea on the right are the numerous and vast Solomon Islands which lately became famous by the voyage of Alvarus Mendanius.

Juan Fernandez, sailing from Chile in 1576, claimed he had discovered the Southern Continent. The Polus Antarcticus map of 1641 by Henricus Hondius, bears the inscription: "Insulas esse a Nova Guinea usque ad Fretum Magellanicum affirmat Hernandus Galego, qui ad eas explorandas missus fuit a Rege Hispaniae Anno 1576 (Hernando Gallego, who in the year 1576 was sent by the King of Spain to explore them, affirms that there are islands from New Guinea up to the Strait of Magellan)".

==== 17th century ====
Luís Vaz de Torres, a Spanish navigator who commanded the San Pedro y San Pablo, the San Pedrico and the tender or yacht, Los Tres Reyes Magos during the 1605–1606 expedition led by Pedro Fernandes de Queiros in quest of the Southern Continent, proved the existence of a passage south of New Guinea, now known as Torres Strait. Commenting on this in 1622, the Dutch cartographer and publisher of Queiros' eighth memorial, Hessel Gerritsz, noted on his Map of the Pacific Ocean: "Those who sailed with the yacht of Pedro Fernando de Quiros in the neighbourhood of New Guinea to 10 degrees westward through many islands and shoals and over 23 and 24 fathoms [42 and 44 m] for as many as 40 days, estimated that Nova Guinea does not extend beyond 10 degrees to the south; if this be so, then the land from 9 to 14 degrees would be a separate land".

Pedro Fernandes de Queirós, another Portuguese navigator sailing for the Spanish Crown, saw a large island south of New Guinea in 1606, which he named La Austrialia del Espiritu Santo. He represented this to the King of Spain as the Terra Australis incognita. In his 10th Memorial (1610), Queirós said: "New Guinea is the top end of the Austral Land of which I treat [discuss], and that people, and customs, with all the rest referred to, resemble them".

Dutch father and son Isaac and Jacob Le Maire established the Australische Compagnie (Australian Company) in 1615 to trade with Terra Australis, which they called "Australia".

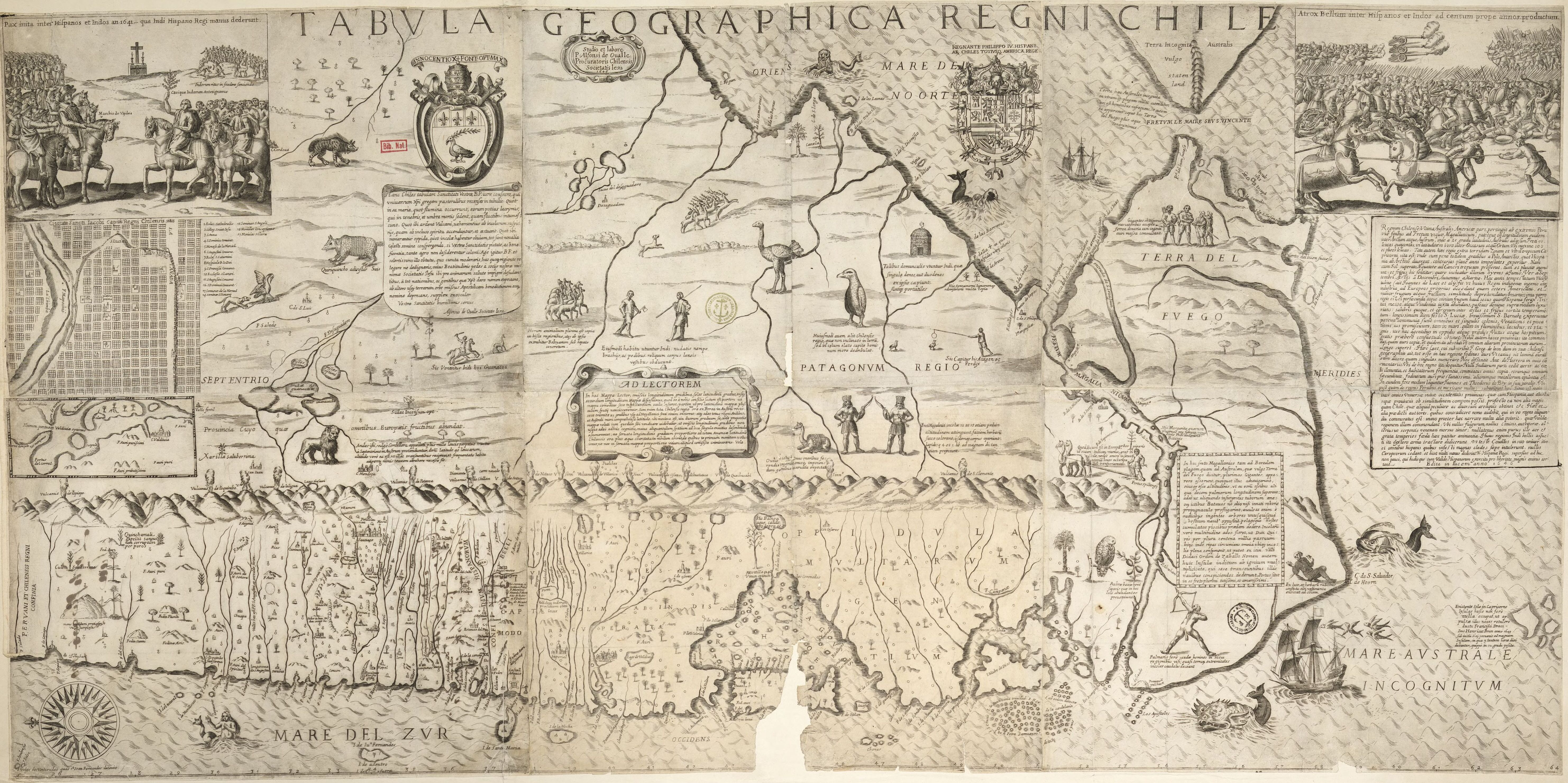
Tabula geographica Regni Chile from 1646 depicts Terra Australis Incognita to the east of Tierra del Fuego.

The Dutch expedition to Valdivia of 1643 intended to round Cape Horn sailing through Le Maire Strait but strong winds made it instead drift south and east. The small fleet led by Hendrik Brouwer managed to enter the Pacific ocean sailing south of the island disproving earlier beliefs that it was part of Terra Australis.

The cartographic depictions of the southern continent in the 16th and early 17th centuries, as might be expected for a concept based on such abundant conjecture and minimal data, varied wildly from map to map; in general, the continent shrank as potential locations were reinterpreted. At its largest, the continent included Tierra del Fuego, separated from South America by a small strait; New Guinea; and what would come to be called Australia. In Ortelius's atlas Theatrum Orbis Terrarum, published in 1570, Terra Australis extends north of the Tropic of Capricorn in the Pacific Ocean.

As long as it appeared on maps at all, the continent minimally included the unexplored lands around the South Pole, but generally much larger than the real Antarctica, spreading far north – especially in the Pacific Ocean. New Zealand, first seen by the Dutch explorer Abel Tasman in 1642, was regarded by some as a part of the continent.

A map with a Terra Australis stretching from New Guinea to the South Pole and beyond was included in the 1676 application by Vittorio Riccio, an Italian missionary in Manila, to be appointed Prefect Apostolic of Terra Australis in order to initiate missionary activity there. His appointment was approved in 1681 but he died in 1685.

==== 18th century ====
Alexander Dalrymple, the Examiner of Sea Journals for the British East India Company, whilst translating some Spanish documents captured in the Philippines in 1762, found de Torres's testimony. This discovery led Dalrymple to publish the Historical Collection of the Several Voyages and Discoveries in the South Pacific Ocean in 1770–1771. Dalrymple presented a beguiling tableau of the Terra Australis, or Southern Continent:

The number of inhabitants in the Southern Continent is probably more than 50 millions, considering the extent, from the eastern part discovered by Juan Fernandez, to the western coast seen by Tasman, is about 100 deg. of longitude, which in the latitude of 40 deg. amounts to 4596 geographic, or 5323 stature miles [8567 km]. This is a greater extent than the whole civilized part of Asia, from Turkey to the eastern extremity of China. There is at present no trade from Europe thither, though the scraps from this table would be sufficient to maintain the power, dominion, and sovereignty of Britain, by employing all its manufacturers and ships. Whoever considers the Peruvian empire, where arts and industry flourished under one of the wisest systems of government, which was founded by a stranger, must have very sanguine expectations of the southern continent, from whence it is more than probable Mango Capac, the first Inca, was derived, and must be convinced that the country, from whence Mango Capac introduced the comforts of civilized life, cannot fail of amply rewarding the fortunate people who shall bestow letters instead of quippos (quipus), and iron in place of more awkward substitutes.

Dalrymple's claim of the existence of an unknown continent aroused widespread interest and prompted the British government in 1769 to order James Cook in HM Bark Endeavour to seek out the Southern Continent to the South and West of Tahiti, discovered in June 1767 by Samuel Wallis in HMS Dolphin and named by him King George Island. The London press reported in June 1768 that two ships would be sent to the newly discovered island and from there to "attempt the Discovery of the Southern Continent". A subsequent press report stated: "We are informed, that the Island which Captain Wallis has discovered in the South-Sea, and named George's Land, is about fifteen hundred Leagues to the Westward and to Leeward of the Coast of Peru, and about five-and-thirty Leagues in circumference; that its principal and almost sole national Advantage is, its Situation for exploring the Terra Incognita of the Southern Hemisphere. The Endeavour, a North-Country Cat, is purchased by the Government, and commanded by a Lieutenant of the Navy; she is fitting out at Deptford for the South-Sea, thought to be intended for the newly-discovered Island". The aims of the expedition were revealed in days following: "To-morrow morning Mr. Banks, Dr. Solano [sic], with Mr. Green, the Astronomer, will set out for Deal, to embark on board the Endeavour, Capt. Cook, for the South Seas, under the direction of the Royal Society, to observe the Transit of Venus next summer, and to make discoveries to the South and West of Cape Horn". The London Gazetteer was more explicit when it reported on 18 August 1768: "The gentlemen, who are to sail in a few days for George's Land, the new discovered island in the Pacific ocean, with an intention to observe the Transit of Venus, are likewise, we are credibly informed, to attempt some new discoveries in that vast unknown tract, above the latitude 40". The results of this first voyage of James Cook in respect of the quest for the Southern Continent were summed up by Cook himself. He wrote in his Journal on 31 March 1770 that the Endeavour's voyage "must be allowed to have set aside the most, if not all, the Arguments and proofs that have been advanced by different Authors to prove that there must be a Southern Continent; I mean to the Northward of 40 degrees South, for what may lie to the Southward of that Latitude I know not".

The second voyage of James Cook aboard HMS Resolution explored the South Pacific for the landmass between 1772 and 1775 whilst also testing Larcum Kendall's K1 chronometer as a method for measuring longitude.

== Decline of the idea ==
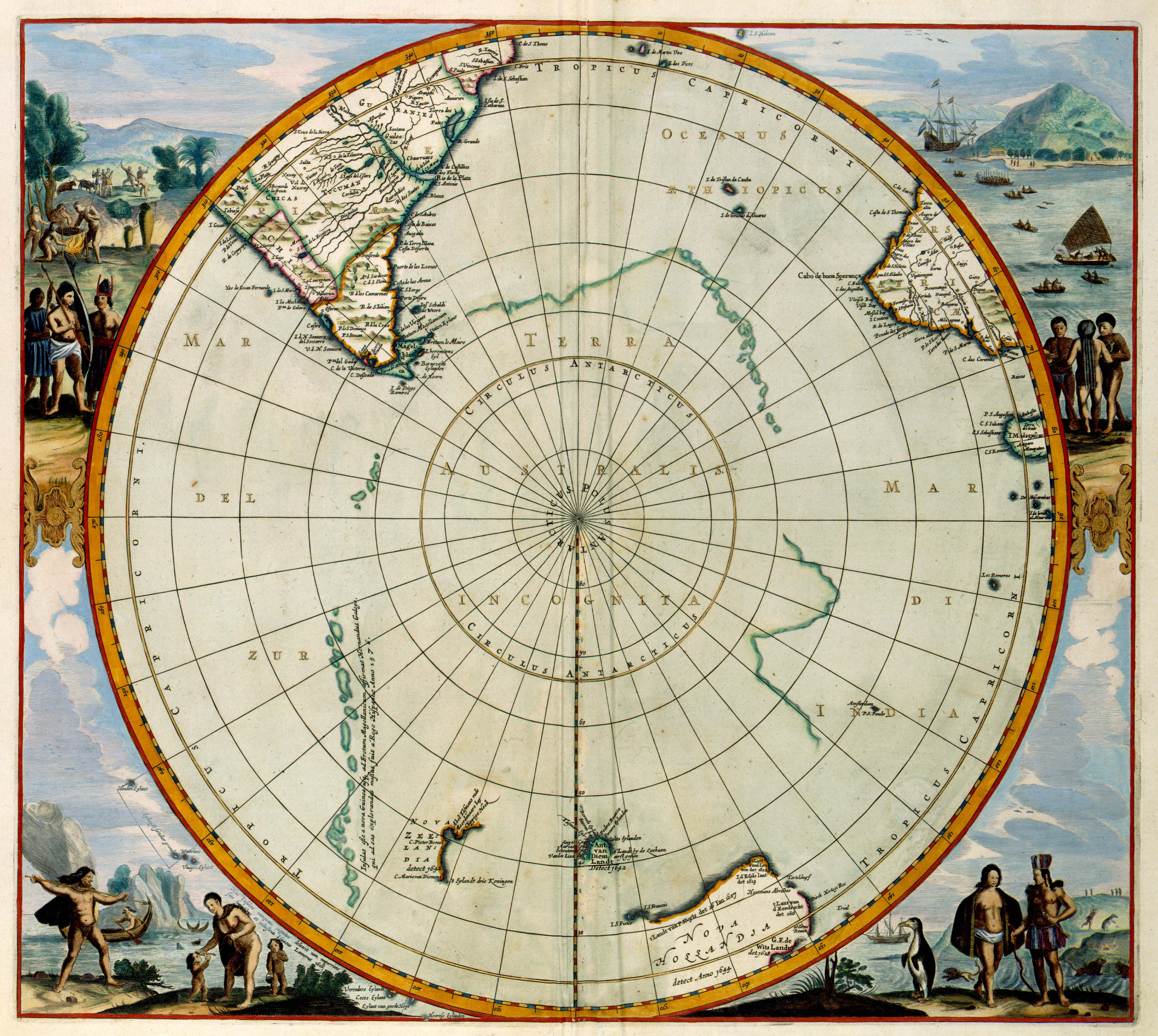
The available territory for a southern continent had diminished greatly in this 1657 map by the Dutch cartographer Jan Janssonius. Terra Australis Incognita ("unknown southern land") is printed across a region including the south pole without any definite shorelines.

Over the centuries the idea of Terra Australis gradually lost its hold. In 1616, Jacob Le Maire and Willem Schouten's rounding of Cape Horn proved that Tierra del Fuego was a relatively small island, while in 1642 Abel Tasman's first Pacific voyage proved that Australia was not part of the mythical southern continent. Much later, James Cook circumnavigated and charted New Zealand in 1770, showing that even it could not be part of a large continent. On his second voyage he circumnavigated the globe at a very high southern latitude, at some places even crossing the Antarctic Circle, showing that any possible southern continent must lie well within the cold polar areas. There could be no extension into regions with a temperate climate, as had been thought before. In 1814, Matthew Flinders published the book A Voyage to Terra Australis. Flinders had concluded that the Terra Australis as hypothesised by Aristotle and Ptolemy did not exist, so he wanted the name applied to what he saw as the next best thing: "Australia" (later the country), replacing the former name for the continent, New Holland. He wrote:

There is no probability, that any other detached body of land, of nearly equal extent, will ever be found in a more southern latitude; the name Terra Australis will, therefore, remain descriptive of the geographical importance of this country, and of its situation on the globe: it has antiquity to recommend it; and, having no reference to either of the two claiming nations, (Note: That is, the United Kingdom and the Dutch Republic.) appears to be less objectionable than any other which could have been selected.

...with the accompanying note at the bottom of the page:

Had I permitted myself any innovation upon the original term, it would have been to convert it into AUSTRALIA; as being more agreeable to the ear, and an assimilation to the names of the other great portions of the earth.

With the discovery of Antarctica his conclusion would soon be revealed as a mistake, but by that time the name had stuck.

== The Province of Beach ==
A land feature known as the "Province of Beach" or "Boeach" – from the Latin Provincia boëach – appears to have resulted from mistranscriptions of a name in Marco Polo's Il Milione (Book III). Polo described his journey by sea from China to India by way of Champa (provincia ciamba; modern southern Vietnam), Java Major, Locach (modern Lop Buri), and Sumatra (Java Minor). In Cantonese, Lavo (an early name of Lop Buri) was pronounced "Lo-huk" (羅斛; Jyutping lo4 huk6) and Locach was Marco Polo's transcription of this name. According to Polo, Locach was a kingdom where gold was "so plentiful that no one who did not see it could believe it". Polo's narrative describes the route southward from Champa toward Sumatra, but by a slip of the pen the name "Java" (which Polo did not himself visit) was substituted for "Champa" as the point of departure, thereby mis-locating Sumatra and Locach south of Java (rather than Champa). Consequently, some geographers believed that Sumatra and Locach were near, or extensions of, Terra Australis.

Kurrent "L" and "B"

In the German cursive script, Locach and Boeach look similar. A feature known as the "Province of Beach" or "Boeach" – from the Latin Provincia boëach – appears on European maps as early as the 15th century. On a map of the world published in Florence in 1489 by Henricus Martellus, the Latin name provincia boëach is given to a southern neighbour of Champa. In a 1532 edition of Marco Polo's Travels, Locach was changed to Boëach, later shortened to Beach.

By the mid-16th century, according to Henry Yule, the editor of a modern (1921) edition of Polo's Travels, some geographers and cartographers followed the error in older editions of Polo that "placed ... the land of "Boeach" (or Locac)" south-east of Java and "introduced in their maps a continent in that situation". Gerard Mercator did just that on his 1541 globe, placing Beach provincia aurifera ("Beach the gold-bearing province") in the northernmost part of the Terra Australis in accordance with the faulty text of Marco Polo's Travels. The landmass of Beach remained in this location on Mercator's world map of 1569, with the amplified description, quoting Marco Polo, Beach provincia aurifera quam pauci ex alienis regionibus adeunt propter gentis inhumanitatem ("Beach the gold-bearing province, whither go few from other countries because of the inhumanity of its people") with Lucach regnum shown somewhat to its south west. Following Mercator, Abraham Ortelius also showed BEACH and LVCACH in these locations on his world map of 1571.

The 1596 map by Jan Huygen van Linschoten showed BEACH and LOCACH, projecting from the map's southern edge as the northernmost parts of the Terra Australis long hypothesised by Europeans. An encounter by the Dutch vessel Eendracht, commanded by Dirk Hartog, with Shark Bay, Western Australia in 1616, appeared to confirm that land existed where the maps showed Beach; Hartog named the wider landmass Eendrachtsland, after his ship. In August 1642, the Council of the Dutch East India Company – evidently still relying on Linschoten's map – despatched Abel Tasman and Frans Jacobszoon Visscher on a voyage of exploration, of which one of the objects was to obtain knowledge of "all the totally unknown provinces of Beach".

== In fiction ==
The unexplored southern continent was a frequent subject of fantastic fiction in the 17th and 18th centuries in the imaginary voyages genre. Among the works which dealt with imaginary visits to the continent (which at the time was still believed to be real) were:

- Mundus alter et idem (1605), a satirical work by Joseph Hall, Bishop of Norwich;
- The Isle of Pines (1668) by the English politician Henry Neville;
- The Southern Land, Known (1676) by Gabriel de Foigny;
- Histoire des Sevarambes (1675) by the French Huguenot writer Denis Vairasse d'Allais.
- Voyages et avantures de Jaques Massé (c. 1715, incorrectly dated 1710) by Simon Tyssot de Patot;
- Miscellanea Aurea: The Fortunate Shipwreck, or a description of New Athens in Terra Australis incognita (1720) by the English dramatist Thomas Killigrew;
- Relation d'un voyage du Pole Arctique, au Pole Antarctique par le centre du monde (1721), anonymous;
- Relation du royaume des Féliciens (1727) by the Marquis de Lassay;
- Viaggi di Enrico Wanton alle Terre incognite Australi (1749) by Zaccaria Seriman;
- Voyage de Robertson, aux Terres Australes, traduit sur le manuscrit anglois (1767), anonymous;
- La découverte australe par un homme-volant (1781) by Restif de la Bretonne;
- The idea of Terra Australis was also used by Terry Pratchett in his Discworld series of novels (1983–2014) where the World is balanced by the strange and little-known Counterweight Continent.

== See also ==
- Early world maps
- Governorate of Terra Australis
- History of Antarctica
- Spanish colonization attempt of the Strait of Magellan
