= Jerónimo de Alderete =

Spanish conquistador (1518–1556)

Adelantado Jerónimo de Alderete Caballero de Santiago
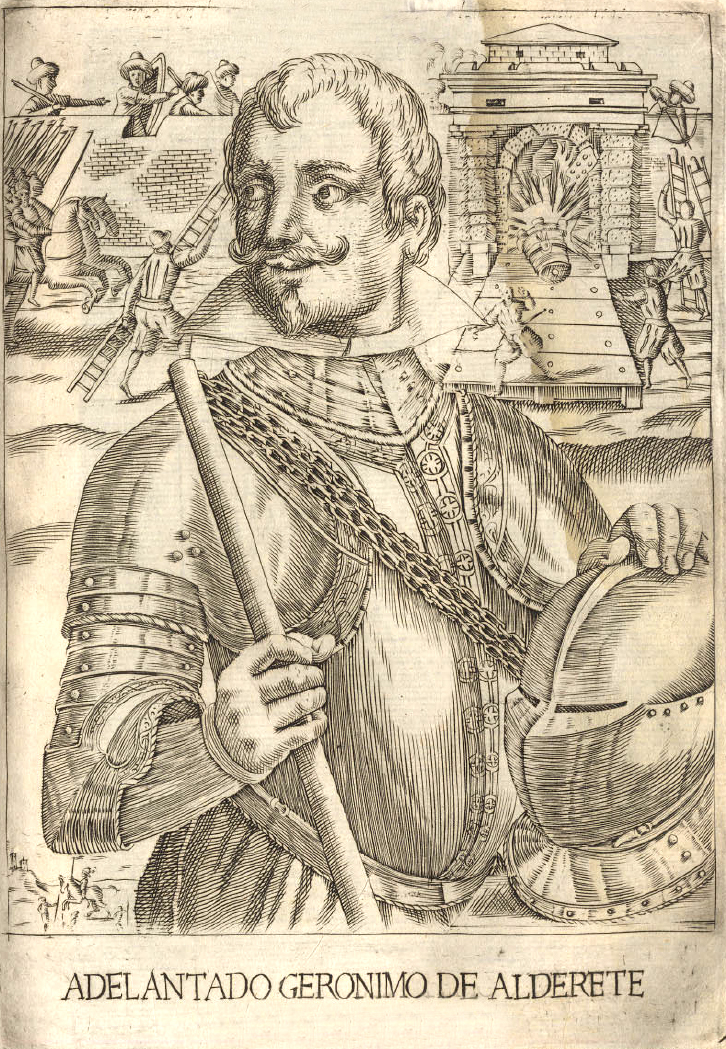

2nd Adelantado and Royal Governor of New Extremadura of Chile
- In office March, 1555 – April, 1556
- Monarch: Philip II of Spain
- Preceded by: Pedro de Valdivia
- Succeeded by: Last holder

3rd Adelantado of Terra Australis
- In office August 2, 1540 – December 25, 1553
- Monarch: Charles I of Spain
- Preceded by: Pedro de Valdivia
- Succeeded by: Last holder

Personal details
- Born: c. 1518; Olmedo, Spain
- Died: April 7, 1556 (aged 37–38); Taboga, Panama

Jerónimo de Alderete y Mercado (Spanish: [xeˈɾonimo ðe aldeˈɾete]; c. 1518 – April 7, 1556) was a Spanish conquistador who was later named governor of Chile, but died before he could assume his post.

== Early life ==
Alderete was born in Olmedo, Castille in 1518, the son of Francisco de Mercado and of Isabel de Alderete. He came to Peru in 1535, under the orders of Diego de Rojas who intended to undertake the conquest of the Gran Chaco region. The expedition had several difficulties attempting to reach the Pilcomayo River. Alderete settled down in Tarija, until he became a member of Francisco de Aguirre's force who joined Pedro de Valdivia's in the conquest of Chile in 1540.

== In Chile ==
Jerónimo de Alderete was part of Pedro de Valdivia's expedition to settle in the Mapocho valley of Chile in 1540. He was a regidor of the first city government of Santiago, Chile in 1541. In 1544, he joined the expedition of Juan Bautista Pastene that was explore the lands to the south to the Straits of Magellan in the bark San Pedro.

In 1550, during the campaign to establish Concepción he led the cavalry charge that broke the leading division of the Mapuche army at the Battle of Penco. In 1552 Valdivia ordered Jerónimo de Alderete to go inland and establish a fort at Lake Villarrica and established a fort at the site of the present Villarrica.

== In Europe ==
In late 1552, Pedro de Valdivia dispatched Alderete to negotiate the confirmation of his governorship with Charles V, but after he arrived back to Spain he discovered that the Emperor had transferred the suzerainty of Chile, and all his other territories, to his son Philip II, who was at the time living in England. Alderete then travelled to London, where he met the King and obtained from him the governorship-for-life for Valdivia. As he was on the road to Spain to start the journey back to Chile, he received the news of the death of Valdivia, so he returned to England once more, where the King appointed him to succeed Valdivia on October 17, 1554, and named him Adelantado and a Knight of Santiago.

In the meantime, back in Chile the will of Valdivia had also appointed him as his successor as governor of Chile, but that was disallowed by the Viceroy of Peru Melchor Bravo de Saravia, who appointed an interim governor. As Alderete was returning to America to assume his post he was taken ill with yellow fever in Panama and died there on April 7, 1556.

== See also ==
- Francisco de Villagra
- Alonso de Ercilla
- Arauco War

== Sources ==
- Ercilla, Alonso de. La Araucana (in Spanish). Eswikisource.
- Góngora Marmolejo, Alonso de (1960). Historia de Todas las Cosas que han Acaecido en el Reino de Chile y de los que lo han gobernado (1536-1575). Crónicas del Reino de Chile (in Spanish). Madrid, Spain: Atlas. pp. 75–224.
- Mariño de Lobera, Pedro (1960). Fr. Bartolomé de Escobar (ed.). Crónica del Reino de Chile, escrita por el capitán Pedro Mariño de Lobera... reducido a nuevo método y estilo por el Padre Bartolomé de Escobar (1593). Crónicas del Reino de Chile (in Spanish). Madrid, Spain: Atlas. pp. 227–562.
- Medina, José Toribio (1906). Diccionario Biográfico Colonial de Chile (PDF) (in Spanish). Santiago, Chile: Imprenta Elzeviriana. pp. 44–49.
- Valdivia, Pedro de (1960). Cartas. Crónicas del Reino de Chile (in Spanish). Madrid, Spain: Atlas. pp. 1–74.
- Vivar, Jerónimo de (1987). Crónica y relación copiosa y verdadera de los reinos de Chile (1558) (in Spanish). Madrid, Spain: Artehistoria Revista Digital. Archived from the original on 2008-05-26.
