= Manuel Ravest Mora =

Chilean lawyer and historian

- Born: 1934
- Died: April 8 2015
- Education: Pontifical Catholic University of Chile
- Occupations: Lawyer and historian
- Spouse: Oriana Peña Riveros
- Children: Manuel Francisco, Matías, Juan Enrique, José Luis

Manuel Ravest Mora (1934 – April 8, 2015) was a Chilean lawyer and historian specializing in the War of the Pacific.

Community of jurisdictions of the Governorate of the Río de la Plata and the Captaincy General of Chile between 1570 and 1661 according to Manuel Ravest Mora.

He held a law degree and a bachelor's in Legal, Political, and Social Sciences from the Pontifical Catholic University of Chile and was a member of the Chilean Academy of Military History.

Ravest Mora conducted significant research on the War of the Pacific, exploring British archives. He translated and published the letters of the Antofagasta Nitrate & Railway Company, which are crucial for a new interpretation of the war's origins, in his book La compañía salitrera y la ocupación de Antofagasta, 1878-1879.

== Personal life ==
From his marriage to Oriana Peña Riveros, he had four children: Manuel Francisco, Matías, Juan Enrique, and José Luis.

== Publications ==
- Ocupación militar de la Araucanía: (1881-1883)
- Juan Martínez. Comandante de los mineros del Atacama
- Barros Arana y la pérdida de la Patagonia: mito y verdad
- La Compañía Salitrera y la ocupación de Antofagasta 1878-1879
- La Patagonia oriental según una real cédula de 1570 menospreciada por la historiografía chilena
