= Governorate of New Andalusia =

Spanish governorate in South America, 1534–1542

Governorate of New Andalucía of Río de la Plata Gobernación de Nueva Andalucía
- 1534–1542
- Cross of Burgundy

- The adelantado grants of Charles V prior to the establishment of the Viceroyalty of Peru.
- Status: Governorate of the Crown of Castile
- Capital: Asunción
- Official languages: Spanish
- Religion: Catholicism
- Government: Monarchy
- King
- Historical era: Spanish Empire
  - Created with the name "Governorate of New Andalusia": 1534
  - Replaced by the Governorate of the Río de la Plata: 1542
- Currency: Escudo
Preceded by
| Inca Empire |
| Guaraní people |
| Diaguita |
| Indigenous peoples in Argentina |
| Indigenous peoples in Paraguay |
Succeeded by
| Captaincy General of Chile |
| Governorate of the Río de la Plata |

The Governorate of New Andalusia was a Spanish Governorate of the Crown of Castile in South America which existed between 1534 and 1542.

== History ==
The governorate was created as one of King Charles V's grants of 1534, establishing the adelantado Pedro de Mendoza as its first governor, captain general, and chief justice. The territory was described as extending 200 leagues down the Pacific coast from Diego de Almagro's grant of New Toledo, but was understood to involve the exploration, pacification, and settlement of the Río de la Plata along the Atlantic.

While in theory the Governorate of New Andalusia included all of present-day Uruguay and Paraguay and large segments of Chile, Argentina and Brazil, the adelantados were only able to effectively colonize the Paraná River, losing other territories to subsequent grants.

=== Disestablishment ===
After the establishment of the Viceroyalty of Peru in 1542, the Governorate of New Andalusia was replaced by the Governorate of the Río de la Plata, under the supervision of the Real Audiencia of Lima.

== Governorates in Hispanic America ==
After the territorial division of South America between Spain and Portugal, the Peruvian Hispanic administration was divided into six entities:

- Province of Tierra Firme, included the Caribbean Coast, Central America, the Pacific Coast of Colombia and Mexico.
- Governorate of New Castile, consisting of the territories from roughly the Ecuadorian-Colombian border in the north to Cuzco in the south.
- Governorate of New Toledo, forming the previous southern half of the Inca empire, stretching towards northern Chile.
- Governorate of New Andalusia, which was not formally conquered by Spain until decades later.
- Governorate of New León, the southernmost part of the continent until the Strait of Magellan.
- Governorate of Terra Australis, territories from the south of the Strait of Magellan to the South Pole.

This territorial division set the basis for the Hispanic administration of South America for several decades. It was formally dissolved in 1544, when King Charles I sent his personal envoy, Blasco Núñez Vela, to govern the newly founded Viceroyalty of Peru that replaced the governorates.

== See also ==
- Colonial Argentina
- Governorate of New Andalusia (1501–13) — in the colonial Venezuela region.
- India Juliana
- New Andalusia Province, or Province of Cumaná (1537–1864) — in the colonial Venezuela region.
