= Governorate of New Castile =

Governorate of the Crown of Castile

Coordinates: 12°02′36″S 77°01′42″W

Governorate of New Castile Gobernación de Nueva Castilla
- 1529–1542
- Military flag

- Spanish map of the administrative division of New Castile made in 1535
- Status: Governorate of the Crown of Castile
- Capital: Jauja 1533–1535; Lima after 1535
- Common languages: Official: Spanish; common: Quechua, Kichwa, Aymara, Puquina.
- Religion: Catholicism
- Government: Monarchy
- King
  - 1516–1556: Charles I
- Governor
  - 1529–1541: Francisco Pizarro
  - 1541–1544: Cristóbal Vaca de Castro
  - 1544–1548: Gonzalo Pizarro (Self-proclaimed; unrecognized by Spanish court until death)
- Historical era: Spanish Empire
  - Capitulation of Toledo: 1529
  - Atahualpa captured by the Spaniards: 1532
  - Fall of Cuzco: 1533
  - Appointment of Francisco Pizarro as Viceroy of Peru: 1542
- Currency: Spanish dollar
Preceded by
| Inca Empire |
| Chanka |
| Cañari |
| Huanca people |
| Chachapoya culture |
| Asháninka |
| Indigenous peoples of the Americas |
Succeeded by
| Viceroyalty of Peru |

The Governorate of New Castile (Gobernación de Nueva Castilla, pronounced [ɡoβeɾnaˈθjon de ˈnweβa kasˈtiʎa]) was the gubernatorial region administered to Francisco Pizarro in 1529 by King Charles I of Spain, of which he was appointed governor via a capitulation.

The region roughly consisted of modern Peru and was, after the foundation of Lima in 1535, divided. The conquest of the Inca Empire in 1531–1533, performed by Pizarro and his brothers set the basis for the territorial boundaries of New Castile.

== Governorates in Hispanic America ==
After the territorial division of South America between Spain and Portugal, the Peruvian Hispanic administration was divided into six entities:

- Province of Tierra Firme, included the Caribbean Coast, Central America, the Pacific Coast of Colombia and Mexico.
- Governorate of New Castile, consisting of the territories from roughly the Ecuadorian-Colombian border in the north to Cuzco in the south.
- Governorate of New Toledo, forming the previous southern half of the Inca Empire, stretching towards central Chile.
- Governorate of New Andalusia, which was not formally conquered by Spain until decades later.
- Governorate of New León, the southernmost part of the continent as far as the Strait of Magellan.
- Governorate of Terra Australis, territories from the south of the Strait of Magellan to the South Pole.

This territorial division set the basis for the Hispanic administration of South America for several decades. It was formally dissolved in 1544, when King Charles I sent his personal envoy, Blasco Núñez Vela, to govern the newly founded Viceroyalty of Peru that replaced the governorates.

== See also ==
- List of viceroys of Peru
- Nueva Castilla in the Spanish East Indies
- Spanish colonization of the Americas
- Spanish Empire
- Viceroyalty of Peru
