= Governorate of New Toledo =

Spanish Imperial colony

Coordinates: 12°02′36″S 77°01′42″W

Governorate of New Toledo Gobernación de Nueva Toledo
- 1529–1542
- Cross of Burgundy

- Spanish map of the administrative division of New Castile and New Toledo made in 1535
- Status: Governorate of the Crown of Castile
- Capital: Cuzco (Claimed by Diego de Almagro)
- Official languages: Spanish
- Religion: Catholicism
- Government: Monarchy
- King
  - 1516–1556: Charles I
- Governor
  - 1529-1534: Simón de Alcazaba y Sotomayor
  - 1534–1538: Simón de Alcazaba y Sotomayor
- Historical era: Spanish Empire
  - Capitulation of Toledo: 1529
  - Viceroy of Peru: 1542
- Currency: Escudo
Preceded by	Succeeded by
Inca Empire; Indigenous peoples of the Americas	Viceroyalty of Peru

The Governorate of New Toledo was a Spanish Governorate of the Crown of Castile formed from the previous southern half of the Inca Empire, stretching south into present day central Chile, and east into present day central Brazil.

It was established by King Charles I of Spain in 1528. Diego de Almagro was the appointed Spanish royal governor after the failure of Simón de Alcazaba y Sotomayor to establish himself in the area after the Capitulation of Toledo of 1529.

It was replaced by the Spanish Viceroyalty of Peru in 1542.

== Governorates in Hispanic America ==
After the territorial division of South America between Spain and Portugal, the Peruvian Hispanic administration was divided into six entities:

- Province of Tierra Firme, included the Caribbean Coast, Central America, the Pacific Coast of Colombia and Mexico.
- Governorate of New Castile, consisting of the territories from roughly the Ecuadorian-Colombian border in the north to Cuzco in the south.
- Governorate of New Toledo, forming the previous southern half of the Inca empire, stretching towards central Chile.
- Governorate of New Andalusia, which was not formally conquered by Spain until decades later.
- Governorate of New León, the southernmost part of the continent until the Strait of Magellan.
- Governorate of Terra Australis, territories from the south of the Strait of Magellan to the South Pole.

This territorial division set the basis for the Hispanic administration of South America for several decades. It was formally dissolved in 1544, when King Charles I sent his personal envoy, Blasco Núñez Vela, to govern the newly founded Viceroyalty of Peru that replaced the governorates.

== See also ==
- Spanish conquest of the Inca Empire
- History of Chile
- Viceroyalty of Peru-related topics
- Spanish Empire
