= Parliament of Quillín =

Diplomatic meeting in Chile between Spain and Mapuche groups

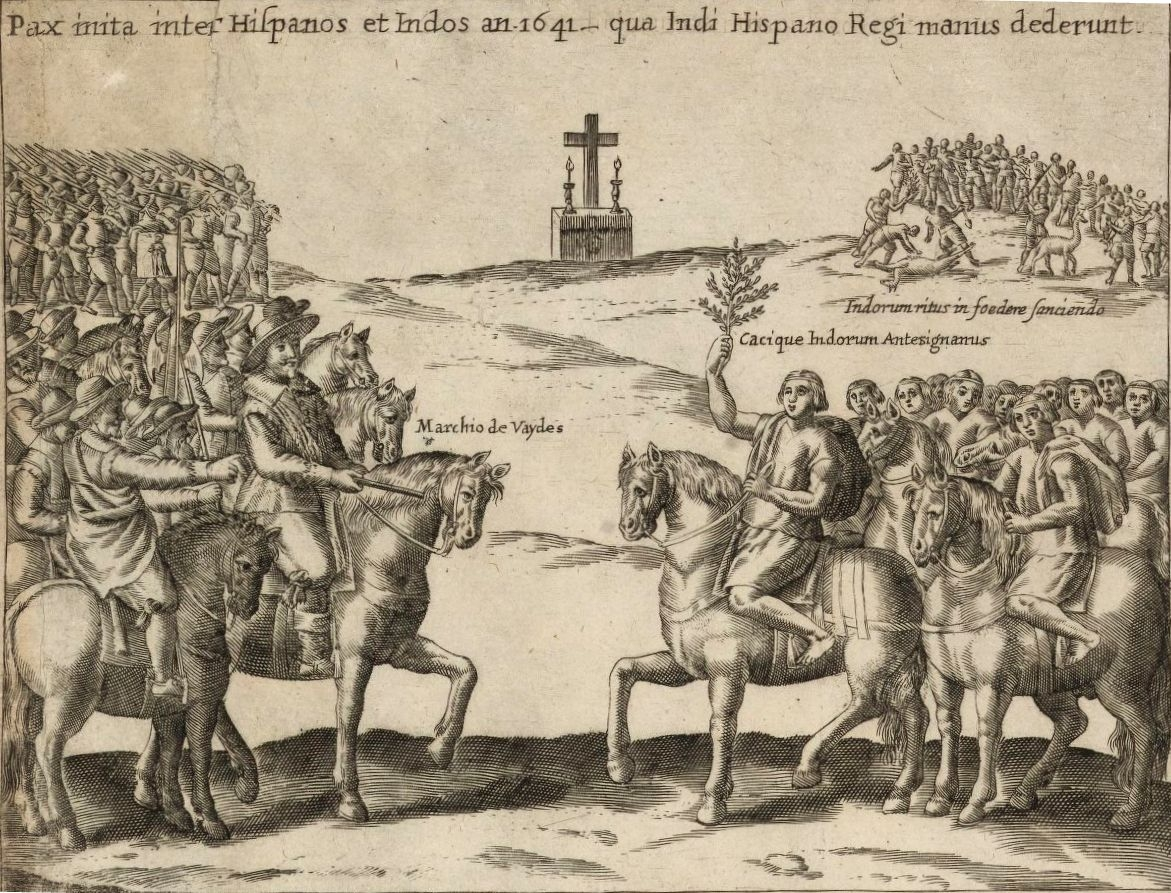
Illustration of the parliament in Alonso de Ovalle's book Histórica Relación del Reyno de Chile.

The Parliament of Quillín (also Killén or Quilín) was a diplomatic meeting held in 1641 between various Mapuche groups and Spanish authorities held in the fields of Quillín. With the ensuing treaty the Spanish sought an end to the hostilities of the Arauco War in order to concentrate the empire's resources in fighting the Catalans in Europe. This way the Mapuche obtained a peace treaty and a recognition of authonomy on behalf of the crown in exchange for loyalty against foreign powers, in a case unique for any indigenous group in the Americas. Another contributing factor for parties to wanting to end warfare may have been the 1640 eruption of Llaima volcano in the middle of the conflict zone. Possibly Mapuches interpreted the eruption as a signal sent from the pillanes.

The parliament served as starting point for the return of many Spanish women held captive by the Mapuche –often in conditions of slavery. However not all Spanish women wanted to go back to life among the Spanish.
