= Governorate of Terra Australis =

Governorate of the Crown of Castile

Governorate of Terra Australis Gobernación de la Terra Australis
- 1539–1555
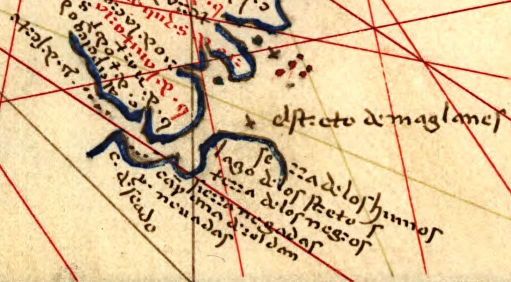
- Detail of a world map from the portalan atlas of Battista Agnese, showing the areas known to Europeans south of the Strait of Magellan in the 1540s.

- Map of territories de jure recognized as Spanish Governorate of Terra Australis (1539-1555), later it was incorporated into the Governorate of Chile
- Status: Governorate of the Crown of Castile
- Official languages: Spanish
- Religion: Catholicism
- Government: Monarchy
- Governor
  - 1539-1540: Pedro Sancho de la Hoz
  - 1540-1553: Pedro de Valdivia
  - 1554-1555: Jerónimo de Alderete
- Historical era: Spanish Empire
  - Created by Capitulación de Pedro Sancho de la Hoz: 1539
  - Incorporated to the Governorate of Chile: 1555
- Currency: Escudo
Preceded by
Selkʼnam people
Yahgan people
Kawésqar
Haush
Succeeded by
Kingdom of Chile

The Governorate of Terra Australis or Governorate of Pedro Sancho de la Hoz was a Spanish Governorate of the Crown of Castile created in 1539 which was granted to Pedro Sánchez de la Hoz and consisted, according to the Spanish Royal Decrees, in all the territories to the south of the Strait of Magellan until the South Pole, and, to the east and west, the borders were the ones specified in the treaties of Tordesillas and Zaragoza, respectively, claiming also the unexplored parts which were theorized as part of the Terra Australis hypothetical continent. The Spanish legal domain was transferred to the Governorate of Chile by ordering the governors to explore and conquer the lands to the south of the strait.

The geographical knowledge of the time was such that Tierra del Fuego was considered part of the hypothetical continent. In 1603, Admiral Gabriel de Castilla, who left Valparaíso to reconnoiter the coasts of Chile, reached the southwest coast, reaching the 64th degree south, and it was not until 1616 that Cape Horn was discovered.

== History ==
After the discovery of the Strait of Magellan in 1520, cartographers were convinced of the ancient theory of Ptolemy about the existence of a continent around the South Pole. Maps and charts were published on the basis that Tierra del Fuego was the discovered part of that continent. Exploring and conquering the Terra Australis was an objective of the Hispanic Monarchy from 1539.

The Governorate was created by King Charles V, establishing the adelantado Pedro Sánchez de la Hoz as its first governor, captain general, and chief justice as soon as he took possession of the assigned territories.

Firstly, I give you license and power to the said Pero Sancho de Hoz so that for us, and in our name and that of the royal crown of Castile, you may sail with the said ships that you thus offer to make for the said South Sea, where the said marquises don Francisco Pizarro, and adelantado don Diego de Almagro, and don Pedro de Mendoza, and Francisco de Camargo have the said governorships, to the said strait of Magellan, and the land that is on the other side of it; and on your way or return, you will discover all that coast on the side of the said strait, without entering into the limits and place of the islands and land that are given in government to other people to conquer, and to govern, nor to rescue, except for the sustenance of the people you will carry, so long as you do not touch the limits and demarcation of the Most Serene King of Portugal, our brother, nor the Malucos, nor the limits which, by the last contract and commitment, were given to the Most Serene King. Item, we promise you that, made the said discovery of the other part of the said strait, or of some island that is not in a foreign place, we will do you the mercy of your services; and while we are informed of what you will thus discover, you will be our governor of it. [...] Date in Toledo on the 24th day of January of the month of 1539 years.

— King Charles I of Spain

However, this did not materialize, and the adelantado ceded his rights on August 2, 1540, to Pedro de Valdivia while both were in Atacama after having been pardoned multiple times by the latter after de la Hoz tried to assassinate him.

Valdivia was the governor of Terra Australis before being appointed governor of Chile, a Governorate that in its beginnings covered from the 27th degree south latitude to the Strait of Magellan, as a result of this, his interest arose to explore the pass and merge Chile with the Governorate of Terra Australis. In 1553, the already governor of Chile sent Jerónimo de Alderete to the Iberian Peninsula, with the mission of obtaining an extension of his governorship and joining it to the one he had obtained from Sancho de Hoz, Valdivia died on December 25 of the same year.

=== Incorporation of Terra Australis to Chile ===
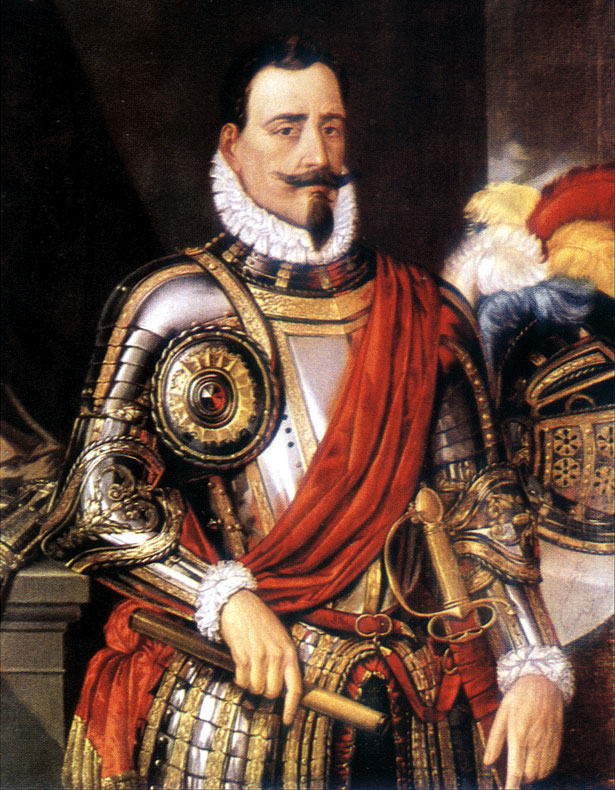
Pedro de Valdivia held the domains of Chile and Terra Australis, which he sought to merge.

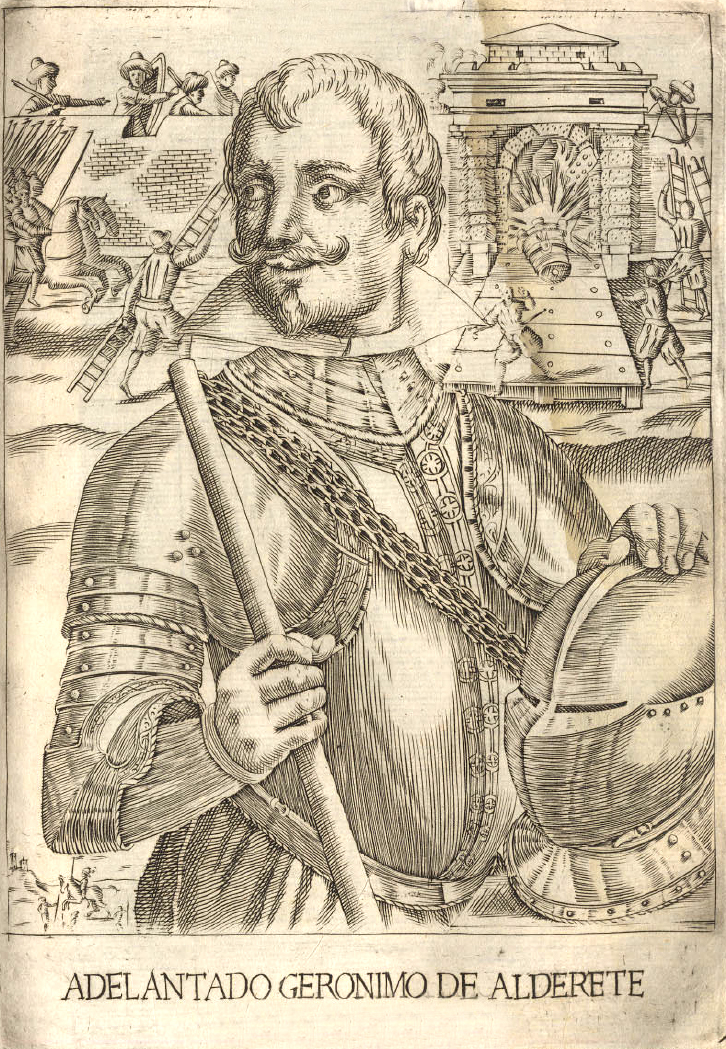
Jerónimo de Alderete was an advance officer of the part of Terra Australis near the Strait of Magellan before being appointed governor of Chile, a position he never held due to his death in Panama.

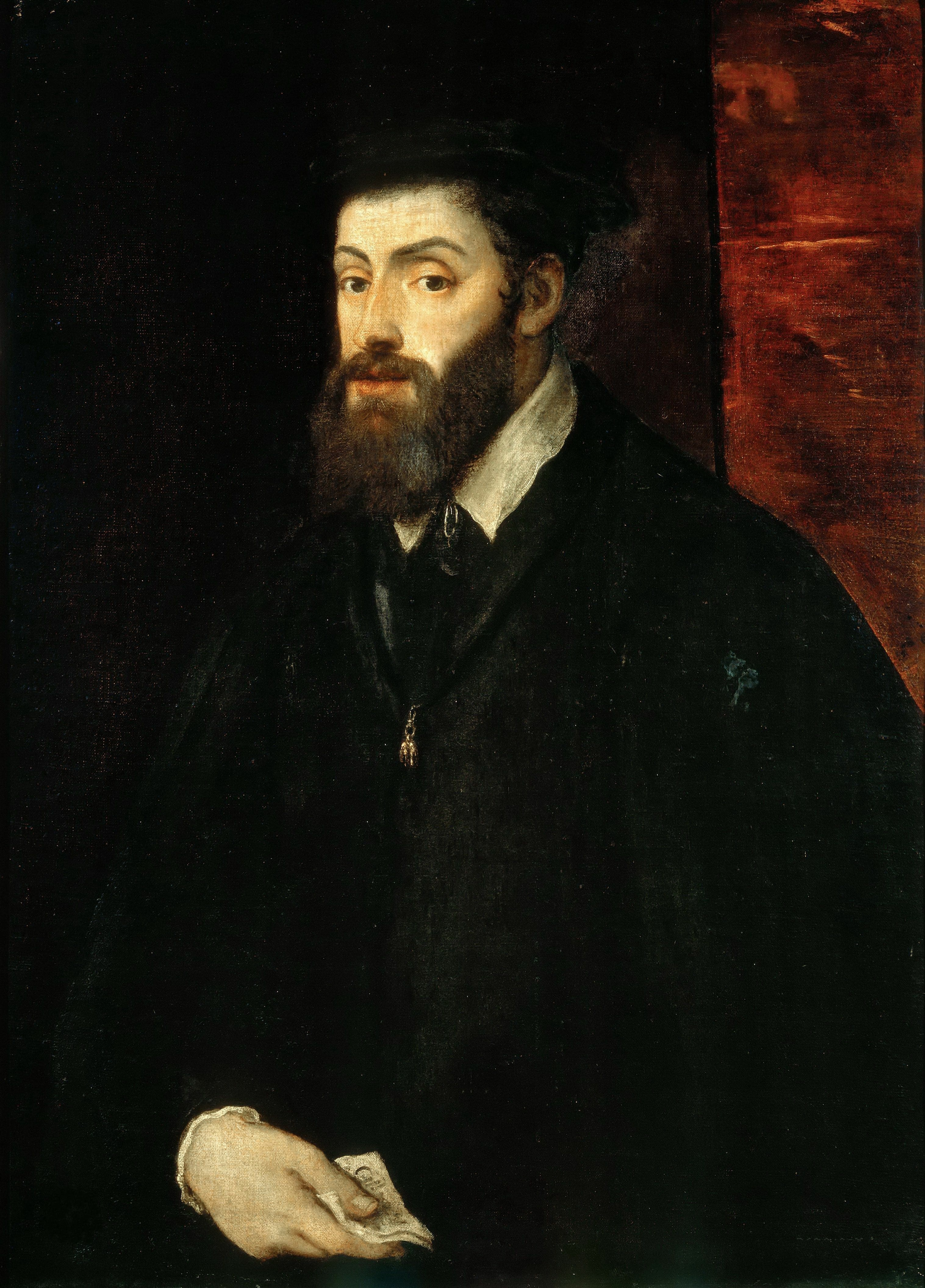
King Charles I of Spain authorized the creation of the Governorate of Terra Australis by means of a royal decree, and ratified its existence by means of other subsequent decrees.

Jerónimo de Alderete achieved his mission at the Court by obtaining the territories south of the strait for himself, requesting the territories immediately south of the Strait of Magellan while Valdivia's death was not yet known. Alderete's request covered "from the said Strait of Magellan along the coast of the southern sea up to three hundred leagues, with all that the said strait lasts", it is estimated that Valdivia authorized Alderete to make this request.

The monarchs granted the extension of Valdivia's governorship to the Strait of Magellan and Alderete's petition in two royal decrees of September 29, 1554, in the one referring to the southern territory it says: "It has seemed to us to grant as we hereby grant to the said Captain Geronimo de Alderete the governorship of the land that as the said strait is on the other side of the said Strait of Magellan". After this, the Council of the Indies would draw the limits of the portion of the Terra Australis granted to Alderete, complementing the details in question by means of a capitulation.

However, the news of the death of Pedro de Valdivia reached the Iberian Peninsula and with this, Alderete inherited all the territory of the Governorate of Terra Australis (not only the one he requested) and on May 29, 1555, he obtained through another royal decree the provinces of Chile, its Patagonian territories, in addition to incorporating the territories of Terra Australis to the kingdom of Chile of which he was also named governor. In this document he was asked to: "take possession in our name of the lands and provinces that fall within the demarcation of the Crown of Castile, on the other side of the said strait".

At the end of 1554 King Charles I sends a letter to the Council of the Indies expressing: "and with regard to the land on the other side of the Strait of Magellan, which we have also given and granted in governorship to the said Geronimo de Alderete, we have ordered him, for the reasons that have been written to you, to send some ships from the said province of Chile to take notice and report on the quality and usefulness of that land, since for the present he is not to go in person or go to conquer or populate it, because at present, having to attend to what is in Chile, the one and the other could not be done, and the other could not be done, the one and the other could not be done together".

In the eight-month period between September 1554 and May 1555, the regions of the Terra Australis requested by Alderete near the Strait of Magellan were under a ruler different from that of Chile, to later be definitively incorporated into the latter once Alderete was named governor of Chile. On April 7, 1556, during his return trip, he died of yellow fever in Panama.

His successor, García Hurtado de Mendoza, sent Juan Ladrillero, in 1558 to take possession of both shores of the Strait of Magellan. When Francisco de Villagra was appointed, he was also asked to take possession of the lands south of the Strait in the Royal Decree that appointed him, leaving the south pole as the southern limit of the Governorate of Chile, based on the title transferred from the Governorate of Terra Australis.

== Governorates in Hispanic America ==
The administrative division and the adelantado grants of Charles V prior to the establishment of the Viceroyalty of Peru, including Terra Australis on its South American part.

After the territorial division of South America between Spain and Portugal, the Peruvian Hispanic administration was divided into six entities:

- Province of Tierra Firme, included the Caribbean Coast, Central America, the Pacific Coast of Colombia and Mexico.
- Governorate of New Castile, consisting of the territories from roughly the Ecuadorian-Colombian border in the north to Cuzco in the south.
- Governorate of New Toledo, forming the previous southern half of the Inca empire, stretching towards central Chile.
- Governorate of New Andalusia, which was not formally conquered by Spain until decades later.
- Governorate of New León, the southernmost part of the continent until the Strait of Magellan.
- Governorate of Terra Australis, territories from the south of the Strait of Magellan to the South Pole.

This territorial division set the basis for the Hispanic administration of South America for several decades. It was formally dissolved in 1544, when King Charles I sent his personal envoy, Blasco Núñez Vela, to govern the newly founded Viceroyalty of Peru that replaced the governorates.

== See also ==
- Chilean Antarctic Territory
- History of Antarctica
- Terra Australis
- Spanish colonization attempt of the Strait of Magellan
