= Pedro Sánchez de la Hoz =

Spanish writer

Adelantado Pedro Sancho de la Hoz

1st Adelantado of Terra Australis
- In office January 24, 1539 – August 2, 1540
- Monarch: Charles I of Spain
- Preceded by: Creation of the title
- Succeeded by: Pedro de Valdivia

Personal details
- Born: 1514 Calahorra, Old Castile, Crown of Castile
- Died: December, 1547 (aged 33) Santiago, Chile
- Profession: Adelantado, chronicler, explorer and conquistador

Military service
- Allegiance: Spain

Pedro Sánchez de la Hoz or Pedro Sancho de la Hoz (1514 in Calahorra, La Rioja – 1547 in Santiago de Chile) was a Spanish merchant, conquistador and adelantado who served as secretary to Pizarro. In 1534 he obtained the rights of a capitulación de conquista south of the Straits of Magellan. He was appointed by Charles V, Holy Roman Emperor as an adelantado of the Governorate of Terra Australis in 1539.

Sánchez de la Hoz, served as secretary to Pizarro in Peru during the conquest of Cuzco and wrote an account of the conquest of Peru. In the manuscript, he expressed admiration of the Cuzco architecture, saying it is "so great and so beautiful and with so many buildings that it would be worthy to be seen in Spain." While the original manuscript was lost, the work was preserved in Italian translation and has subsequently been translated to other languages, serving as a valuable account of both the Spanish conquest and Incan ethnography. After some financial success, he returned to Spain and was granted leave by Emperor Charles V to return to the New World where he conflicted with rival conquistador Pedro de Valdivia over different grants to lands south of Peru. In 1547 Francisco de Villagra, one of Valdivia's men, had Sánchez de la Hoz executed for leading a rebellion.

View of the capitulaciones granted by Charles V, Holy Roman Emperor in 1534

According to Argentina and Chile the capitulación granted to Sánchez de la Hoz proves the Spanish Empire had claims and an animus occupandi on the lands that would later be called Antarctica. Given that Chile and Argentina have historically successfully established their border based on the uti possidetis iuris principle of international law the Sánchez de la Hoz grant forms part of their arguments for territorial claims in Antarctica.
